= Catholic Church in Lebanon =

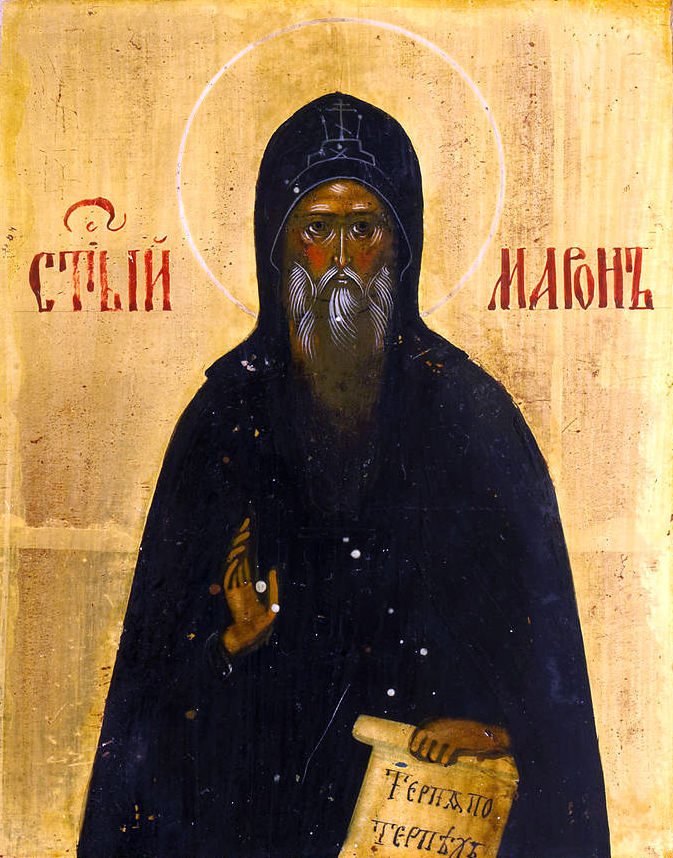
- Saint Maron, Founder of the Maronite Church
- Type: National polity
- Classification: Catholic
- Orientation: Latin and Eastern
- Theology: Catholic theology
- Polity: Episcopal
- Pope: Leo XIV
- Patriarch: Bechara Boutros al-Rahi
- Region: Lebanon
- Language: Arabic, Aramaic
- Founder: Saint Peter; Saint Maron (According to tradition)
- Members: 1.34 million in 2020

The Catholic Church in Lebanon (Arabic: الكنيسة الكاثوليكية في لبنان) is part of the worldwide Catholic Church under the spiritual leadership of the Pope in Rome.

There were approximately 1.34 million Catholics in Lebanon in 2020, the majority of whom are not Latin Catholics but instead follow Eastern Catholic rites as part of the Catholic Church - mostly Maronite, but also Melkite as well as Catholic rites non-native to Lebanon like Armenian, Chaldean, and Syriac.

The Maronite Church constitutes the largest Eastern Catholic church represented in both Lebanon, and the Middle East. The "Land of the Cedars", as Lebanon is known, is the only one in the region where Catholics play an active role in national politics. Besides the President of the Republic, which by the Constitution of Lebanon must be a Maronite Catholic, in the Lebanese Parliament there are 43 seats reserved to Catholics out of a total of 128 seats. Catholics are also well represented in the government and in the public life.

Until the 1960s, Catholics were also the major component of the population and represented 43% of all Lebanese. By 2010, they were considered around 36% of the total population, being Maronites 30%, Melkites 5% and non-native to Lebanon Catholic rites like Armenian Catholics 1%.

== Recent history ==
Muslim and Christian communities coexist in the country for centuries. Cohabitation was sanctioned by a National Pact in 1943, which created a democracy based on religious communities. The country became a good example of religious and ethnic coexistence. But that lasted only a few decades. The larger communities, Christian and Muslim, were upset by the long Lebanese Civil War that raged between 1975 and 1990. The religious geography of the capital Beirut was redrawn: 65,000 Shiite Muslims abandoned their neighborhoods, and Nabaa chout; from interior regions, in contrast, to the capital flowed 80,000 Maronites and Druzes. As a result of the Civil War, West Beirut was progressively abandoned by Christians. Also, a mass exodus fleeing saw tens of thousands of civilians, including Christians, Druze and Sunni Muslims.

Not enough internal upheavals, during this period, tens of thousands of Palestinian refugees entered the country. At the end of the Lebanese Civil War, Christians, by majority, were discovered minority.

In 1995 it was held a Special Assembly of Bishops for the Lebanon, convened by Pope John Paul II in Rome.

== Territory and statistics ==
Since 1954 the Holy See has its own seat in Lebanon, the Apostolic Vicariate of Beirut, with 15,000 Latin Catholics, 161 priests and 8 parishes in 2010. In the same year, there were 1,382,400 Catholics in Lebanon (mainly Eastern Catholics), with 23 episcopal sees, 1,603 priests and 1,253 parishes belonging to the six Catholic rites. These numbers stayed consistent for the subsequent ten years.

== Rites of the Catholic Church in Lebanon ==
In addition to the Latin Church in Lebanon there are five other Catholic Churches sui iuris. Each is characterized by a liturgical rite specific differences. Among them, the main in Lebanon is the Syro-Antiochene. The Catholic Antiochian Rite form two distinct groups: the Maronite Church (main Catholic religious branch in Lebanon) and Syriac Catholic Church. Both churches have their patriarchal see in Lebanon. However, the Melkite Greek Catholic Church (second most important Catholic branch in Lebanon), Armenian Catholic Church and Chaldean Catholic Church are also present.

== Religious institutes ==
Religious orders or institutes that have their mother house in Lebanon include:

=== Maronites ===
- Baladites
- Antonins
- Aleppians (O.M.M.)
- Kreimists or Lebanese missionaries

=== Melkite Catholics ===
- Basilian Chouerite Order
- Basilian Salvatorian Order
- Basilian Alepian Order
- Congregazione dei Sacri Cuori di Gesù e di Maria
- Francescane della Croce del Libano
- Istituto del Clero Patriarcale di Bzommar
- Monache Maronite
- Ordine Basiliano di San Giovanni Battista
- Suore Basiliane Aleppine
- Congrégation des Soeurs Basiliennes Chouérites
- Suore Salvatoriane dell'Annunciazione

=== Other ===
The Sisters of the Forsaken Jesus operate a mission in Baalbek.

== See also ==
- Apostolic Nunciature to Lebanon
- Christianity in Lebanon
- Lebanese people (Maronite Christians)
- Lebanese people (Melkite Christians)
- Lebanese people (Greek Orthodox Christians)
- Lebanese people (Protestant Christians)
- Latin Church in Lebanon
- French people in Lebanon
- Italians in Lebanon
- List of Saints from Asia
