= Moussa El-Hage =

Moussa El-Hage O.A.M.
- Archeparch of Haifa and the Holy Land
- Native name: موسى الحاج
- Church: Maronite Church
- Archdiocese: Archeparchy of Haifa and the Holy Land
- Installed: 16 June 2012
- Predecessor: Paul Nabil El-Sayah
- Other posts: Patriarchal Exarch of Jerusalem and Palestine (since 2012); Patriarchal Exarch of Jordan (since 2012)
- Previous post: Apostolic Administrator of Akka (2014)

Orders
- Ordination: 14 August 1980
- Consecration: 28 July 2012 by Bechara Boutros al-Rahi

Personal details
- Born: 19 February 1954 (age 72) Aintoura, Mount Lebanon Governorate, Lebanon

Moussa El-Hage (Arabic: موسى الحاج, born on 19 February 1954, in Aintoura, Lebanon), is a Maronite Catholic eparch, now Archbishop of the Archeparchy of Haifa and the Holy Land and Patriarchal Exarch of Jerusalem and Palestine and Jordan.

== Life ==
Moussa El-Hage joined the Maronite religious Antonin Maronite Order in 1972, making vows in 1979, receiving holy orders on 14 August 1980.

He studied Philosophy and Theology at the Pontifical University of St. Thomas Aquinas and Biblical Theology in Studium Biblicum Franciscanum (part of the Pontifical University Antonianum), and is a PhD in Oriental Studies and Liturgy at the Pontifical Oriental Institute. In addition to Arabic, El-Hage speaks English, French and Italian; and knows the languages Syriac, Greek, Hebrew and Aramaic.

After being ordained, he received several orders in the Maronite pastoral mission in southern Lebanon (until 1985), and was rector of the seminary of St. Anthony of Padua in Karmsadi. Later he carried out several positions in your order, as well as the University Antonian. Back in Lebanon, was abbot of the monasteries of Saint Sergius and Saint Bacchus in Ihdin and Sarurta.

== Episcopate ==
On 16 June 2012 Pope Benedict XVI confirmed his appointment as Patriarchal Exarch of Jerusalem and Palestine and Jordan, as well as Archbishop of Haifa and the Holy Land. He was consecrated bishop on 28 July of the same year, by Maronite Patriarch of Antioch, Bechara Boutros al-Rahi, as principal consecrator. His co-consecrators were Samir Mazloum, Titular bishop of Callinicum dei Maroniti, Guy-Paul Noujaim, Titular Bishop of Caesarea Philippi, Paul Youssef Matar, Archeparch of Beirut, Francis Némé Baïssari, Titular Bishop of Aradus, Paul Nabil El-Sayah, Curial Bishop of Antioch, Joseph Mohsen Béchara, Emeritus Eparch of Antelias, Simon Atallah, Eparch of Baalbek-Deir El-Ahmar, François Eid, OMM, Emeritus Eparch of Cairo, Edgard Madi, Eparch of Nossa Senhora do Líbano em São Paulo, and Michel Aoun, Eparch of Byblos.

On 27 January 2014 Pope Francis named him apostolic administrator of Melkite Greek Catholic Archeparchy of Akka of Greek-Melkites after the resignation of the holder Elias Chacour.

El-Hage is a member of the Biblical Commission (since 1993) and liturgical (since 2011) of the Maronite Patriarchate.
