= Paul Marwan Tabet =

Lebanese maronite catholic bishop in Canada

Paul Marwan Tabet LM
- Eparch of Saint Maron of Montreal
- Native name: باول مروان ثابت
- Church: Catholic Church
- Diocese: Eparchy of Saint Maron of Montreal
- Appointed: 10 January 2013
- Predecessor: Joseph Khoury

Orders
- Ordination: 20 July 1986 by Nasrallah Boutros Sfeir
- Consecration: 26 January 2013 by Bechara Boutros al-Rahi

Personal details
- Born: 20 July 1961 (age 65) Bhamdoun, Mount Lebanon Governorate, Lebanon

Paul Marwan Tabet MLM (born on 20 July 1961 in Bhamdoun, Lebanon) is the current Eparch of the Maronite Catholic Eparchy of Saint Maron of Montreal since 26 January 2013.

== Life ==
Paul Marwan Tabet joined the religious community of the Congregation of the Lebanese Maronite Missionaries on 26 September 1979 and the Maronite Patriarch of Antioch and all the East, Nasrallah Boutros Sfeir, consecrated him priest on 20 July 1986.

The Synod of the Maronite Church elected him in June 2012 to the Maronite Catholic Eparchy of Saint Maron of Montreal. His appointment was on 10 January 2013 by Pope Benedict XVI. Maronite Patriarch of Antioch, Bechara Boutros al-Rahi, OMM give him on 26 January 2013 his episcopal ordination, and his co-consecrators were Camille Zaidan, Archbishop of the Maronite Catholic Archeparchy of Antelias and Paul Nabil El-Sayah, Curial Bishop in Antioch. Tabet was installed in the office on 24 February of the same year. He replaced Bishop Joseph Khoury who served in the same position from 1996 to 2013.
