= Maronite Catholic Patriarchal Exarchate of Jerusalem and Palestine =

Eastern Catholic missionary jurisdiction in Palestine

Patriarchal Exarchate of Jerusalem and Palestine (Maronite)

Location
- Country: Palestine

Statistics
- Population: (as of 2012); 504
- Parishes: 3

Information
- Denomination: Catholic Church
- Sui iuris church: Maronite Church
- Rite: West Syro-Antiochene Rite
- Established: 5 October 1996
- Cathedral: Maronite Convent
- Secular priests: 1

Current leadership
- Pope: Leo XIV
- Patriarch: Bechara Boutros al-Rahi
- Patriarchal Exarch: Moussa El-Hage

Website
- http://www.maronitejerusalem.org/

Maronite Catholic Patriarchal Exarchate of Jerusalem and Palestine is an exarchate of the Maronite Patriarchate of the Maronite Church immediately subject to the Patriarchate of Antioch of the Maronites. In 2017 there were 504 members. It is currently governed by archeparch Moussa El-Hage, OAM.

== Territory and statistics ==
The exarchate extends its jurisdiction over the Maronite Catholic faithful living in East Jerusalem and in the West Bank.

It includes three parishes and in 2017 there were 504 members served by one priest.

== History ==
On 5 May 1895, two years after the International Eucharistic Congress held in Jerusalem, was inaugurated in the Holy Land a Patriarchal Vicariate to meet Lebanese Maronites that lived there until then directly dependent on the Maronite Catholic Archeparchy of Tyre.

Since its erection the patriarchal exarchate on 5 October 1996 it was entrusted to the pastoral care of Archeparch of the Maronite Catholic Archeparchy of Haifa and the Holy Land, who is its in persona episcopi.

== Patriarchal Vicars ==
Titular list of the Maronite Patriarchal Vicariate of Jerusalem since its founding in 1895:

- Youssef Mouallem, 1895-1896. He went to America.
- Estephan Hobeish, 1896-1897.
- Boulos Aweiss, 1897-1898.
- Khairalla Estephan, 1898-1901.
- Youssef Mouallem, 1901-1911. For the second time.
- Gerges Doumit, 1911-1928. After his resignation, he became a monk.
- Boulos Aweiss, 1929-1934. For the second time. He died during his homily and is buried on Zion Hill.
- Boulos Eid, 1934-1938.
- Youssef Ghanem, 1939-1941. On 12 April 1939, he was appointed by a Patriarchal Decree as temporary Vicar. On 8 September 1939, a letter from the Patriarch removed him from his office because of serious problems he had caused. The Vicariate remained without an actual titular until 1950 and the Maronite community of Jerusalem was abandoned. Between 23 September 1940 and 4 June 1950, therefore, only one christening took place; this occurred on 25 November 1945 and was performed by a delegate priest. This task was nominally assumed by a priest from Jaffa or Haifa (Boulos Meouchi or Francis Moubarac).
  - Boulos Meouchi, 1941-1945. The monk responsible for the monastery of Jaffa. On 25 September 1941, a Patriarchal Decree appointed him president of the Court of First Instance in Jaffa.
  - Francis Moubarac, 1945-1949.
- Elias Ziadé, 1949-1975. The number of faithful right before the war of 1948 was 800, after which it dropped to about 60. On 11 July 1949, Elias Ziadé was appointed Vicar in Jerusalem by Patriarchal decree. On 11 August, another decree extended this office to Transjordan. Father Ziadé stayed in charge until his death on 23 April 1975.
  - Also in 1949, Michel Edde was appointed as the first "Moukhtar" of the community. On 15 June 1958, the Jordanian Government officially recognized the Maronite Church. On 15 May 1964, Patriarch Meouchi placed Monsignor Elias Ziadé in charge as parish priest of the Maronites in Jordan. A welfare society run by eight members was established and, on 28 July 1964, the society was recognized by the Jordanian Ministry of Interior Affairs.
- Augustin Harfouche, 1975-1996.

== Patriarchal Exarchs ==
- Paul Nabil El-Sayah (5 October 1996 - 6 June 2011 appointed archbishop, personally, of the curia of the Patriarchate of Antioch of the Maronites)
- Moussa El-Hage, OAM, (since 16 June 2012)
