= St. Maron's Cathedral, Buenos Aires =

St. Maron's Cathedral
- Catedral de San Marón
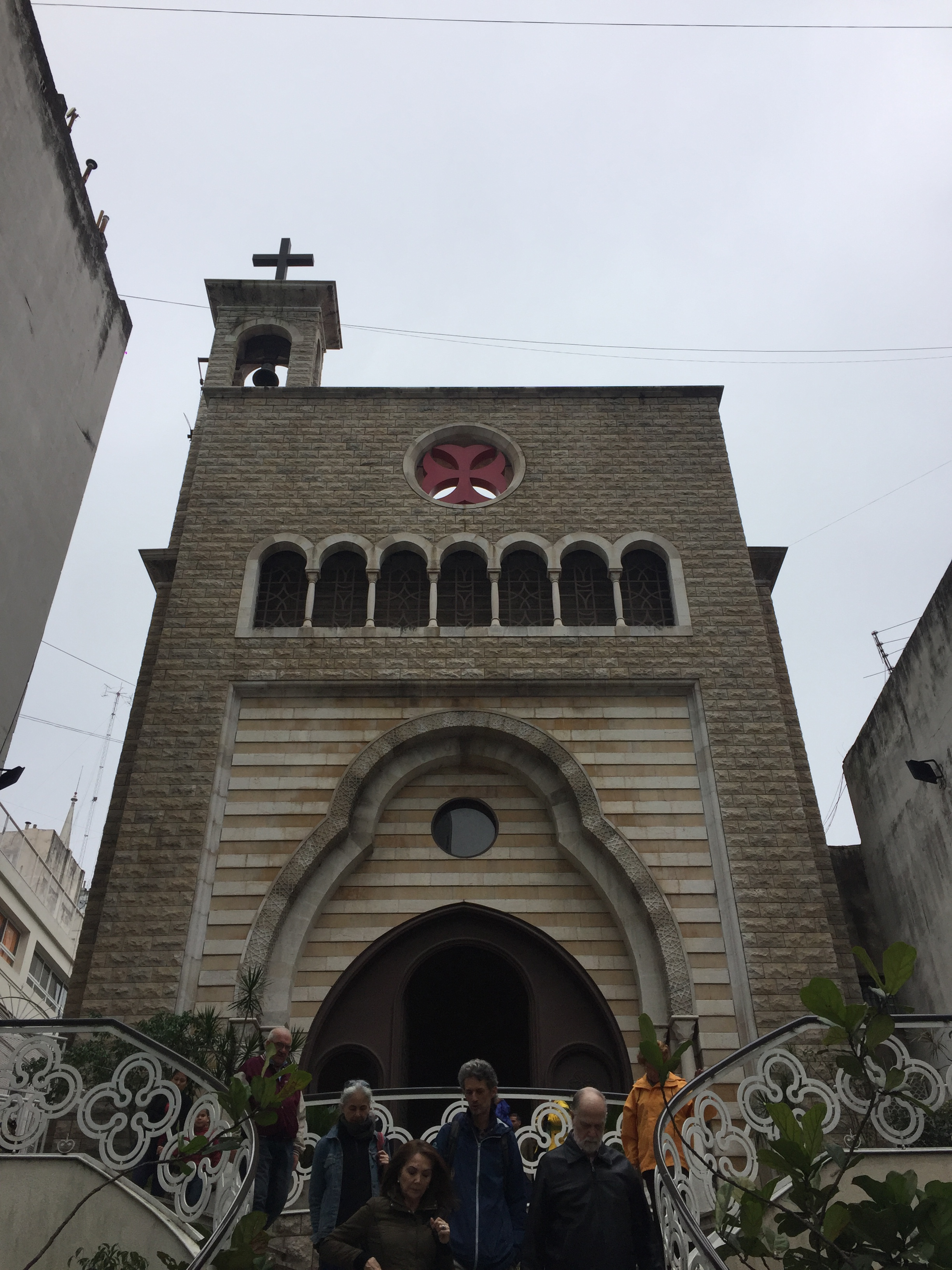
- St. Maron's Cathedral
- 34°35′53″S 58°22′44″W
- Location: Buenos Aires
- Country: Argentina
- Denomination: Catholic church (Maronite rite)

The St. Maron's Cathedral (Spanish: Catedral de San Marón) also called Maronite Catholic Cathedral of Buenos Aires is a religious building of the Catholic Church (Maronite) located at 834 Paraguay Street, in the Autonomous City of Buenos Aires, Argentina. Not to be confused with the metropolitan cathedral of Latin rite of the Holy Trinity, the cathedral of the military bishopric also of Latin rite or the Armenian Catholic Cathedral of Our Lady of Narek, all in the city of Buenos Aires.

In its beginnings, in 1905, the temple was a chapel next to a school. Its current building was inaugurated in 2001. The congregation follows the Maronite rite or Antiochian liturgical tradition and is the seat of the Maronite Eparchy of San Charbel in Buenos Aires (Eparchia Sancti Sarbelii Bonaërensis Maronitarum) that was established by Pope John Paul II in October 1990.

At the moment its seat is vacant because it does not have a bishop. Its apostolic administrator is the priest Habib Chamieh.

== See also ==
- Roman Catholicism in Argentina
- St. Maron's Cathedral in Sydney
