= Maronite Catholic Eparchy of Saint Maron of Montreal =

Maronite Catholic eparchy jurisdiction in Canada

Eparchy of Saint Maron of Montreal (Maronite) Eparchia Sancti Maronis Marianopolitana Maronitarum

Location
- Country: Canada
- Ecclesiastical province: Immediately exempt to the Holy See

Statistics
- Population: (as of 2014); 87,900
- Parishes: 17

Information
- Denomination: Catholic Church
- Sui iuris church: Maronite Church
- Established: August 27, 1982 (44 years ago)
- Cathedral: Saint Maron Cathedral

Current leadership
- Pope: Leo XIV
- Patriarch: Bechara Boutros al-Rahi
- Eparch: Paul Marwan Tabet
- Bishops emeritus: Joseph Khoury

The Maronite Eparchy of Saint Maron of Montreal (in Latin: Eparchia Sancti Maronis Marianopolitana Maronitarum) is a Maronite Church ecclesiastical territory or eparchy of the Catholic Church in Canada. In 2014 there were 87,900 baptized. It is currently ruled by Eparch Paul Marwan Tabet.

== Territory and statistics ==
Its episcopal see is located in Montréal, Quebec, where is located the Saint-Maron Cathedral. Its jurisdiction embraces all Maronite Catholic faithful of the Maronite Church in Canada. It is directly subject to the Holy See in Rome, not part of any ecclesiastical province. In 2014 there were 87,900 baptized. Its current eparch is Paul Marwan Tabet, MLM.

The territory is divided into 17 parishes and in 2014 had 87,900 Lebanese Maronite Catholics.

== History ==
It was established by the Pope John Paul II on August 27, 1982 on territory previously without Ordinary for the particular church sui iuris. Most of the faithful Maronites of the eparchy arrived in Canada in major immigration periods, from present-day Lebanon, between 1860 and 1914, 1930 and 1960, 1970 to 1980 and 1989 to 1991. The Maronites brought a rich culture to their new homeland and retained their religious affiliation in a traditionally Christian society which had become largely agnostic.

In 1985 was founded in the eparchy of Montréal the first Canadian Maronite monastery, Saint Anthony the Great on Ducharme Avenue in Outremont in Quebec, belonged to the OLM. His former superior, Father Louis Hage was awarded by the Commemorative Medal for the 125th anniversary of Canada's Confederation on 13 April 1993.

== Eparchs ==
- Elias Shaheen (Elias Chahine), first Bishop of Saint-Maron de Montréal of the Maronites (Canada) (27 August 1982 – 13 March 1985), then promoted ad personam Archbishop-Bishop of Saint-Maron de Montréal of the Maronites (Canada) (13 March 1985 – 23 November 1990)
- Georges Abi-Saber, O.L.M. (23 November 1990 – 7 February 1996), previously Eparch (Bishop) of Latakia of the Maronites (Syria) (4 August 1977 – 2 May 1986), Titular Bishop of Aradus (2 May 1986 – 23 November 1990), Patriarchal Vicar of Antioch of the Maronites (Lebanon) (2 May 1986 – 23 November 1990)
- Joseph Khoury (11 November 1996 – 10 January 2013), previously Titular Bishop of Chonochora (29 April 1993 – 11 November 1996)
- Paul Marwan Tabet, MLM (since 10 November 2013)

== Extent ==
There are 80,000 Lebanese Maronites in Montreal alone, distributed into seventeen parishes and missions.

The College of Antonin of the Lebanese Maronites is inside the Eparchy. He first built a monastery in the region in 1985 which is the Monastery of Saint Anthony the Great on Ducharme Avenue in Outremont.

Saint Maron is the patron saint of the eparchy. The Maronite Church of Saint-Georges du Mont Royal also attracts many Maronite worshipers in the region of Montreal.

== Parishes ==
(by Canadian province)

Alberta

- Our Lady of Peace, Calgary
- Our Lady of Good Help, Edmonton

Ontario

- St. Charbel, Ottawa
- St. Charbel, Oldcastle
- St. Charbel, Mississauga
- St. Elias, London
- Our Lady of Lebanon, Toronto
- St. Anthony the Great, Leamington
- St. Peter's, Windsor

New Brunswick

- St. Charbel, Fredericton

Nova Scotia

- Our Lady of Lebanon, Halifax

Quebec

- St. Maron Cathedral, Montréal
- St. Antoine le Grand, Montréal
- St. Rafqa, Longueuil
- St. Joseph, Laval
- Our Lady of Lebanon, Québec City

Prince Edward Island

- Our Lady of Annunciation, Charlottetown

== Sources and external links ==
- Maronite Catholic Eparchy of Saint Maron
- Cathédrale Saint Maron - Montréal
- Missa
