= Elias Shaheen =

- Archeparch of Saint Maron of Montreal
- Native name: الياس شاهين
- Church: Maronite Church
- Diocese: Eparchy of Saint Maron of Montreal
- In office: 27 August 1982 – 23 November 1990
- Predecessor: Eparchy erected
- Successor: Georges Abi-Saber

Orders
- Ordination: 25 March 1939
- Consecration: 7 November 1982 by Anthony Peter Khoraish

Personal details
- Born: 20 July 1914 Aabrine (east of Batroun), Mount Lebanon Mutasarrifate, Ottoman Empire
- Died: 5 December 1991 (aged 77)

Elias Shaheen or Elias Chahine (in Arabic الياس شاهين) (20 July 1914 in Ebrine, Lebanon – 5 December 1991) was the first bishop (eparch) of the Maronite Church in Canada and in 1985 was appointed Archeparch of the Maronite Catholic Eparchy of Saint Maron of Montreal.

== Life ==
Shaheen was born in Ebrine, Lebanon. On 25 March 1939, he was consecrated priest. He was appointed first Maronite eparch of the Maronite Catholic Eparchy of Saint Maron of Montreal on 27 August 1982. Maronite Patriarch of Antioch, Cardinal Anthony Peter Khoraish, consecrated him eparch on 7 November 1982 and his co-consecrators were Archeparch Francis Mansour Zayek of Brooklyn and the Auxiliary eparch of Antioch, Eparch Roland Aboujaoudé. On 13 March 1985 Elias Shaheen was appointed Archeparch of Montréal. On 23 November 1990 he became Archeparch emeritus and was until his death on 5 December 1991. Shaheen was succeeded by Eparch Georges Abi-Saber, OLM.
