= Charbel Georges Merhi =

Spanish bishop (born 1937)

Charbel Georges Merhi LM
- Eparch Emeritus of Saint Charbel in Buenos Aires
- Native name: شربل جورج مرعي
- Church: Maronite Church
- Diocese: Eparchy of Saint Charbel in Buenos Aires
- In office: 5 October 1990 – 17 April 2013
- Predecessor: Eparchy erected
- Successor: Habib Chamieh

Orders
- Ordination: 29 August 1964
- Consecration: 2 December 1990 by Nasrallah Boutros Sfeir

Personal details
- Born: 12 October 1937 (age 89) Edde, Mandatory Lebanese Republic, French Empire

Charbel Georges Merhi MLM (Arabic: شربل جورج مرعي; born on 12 October 1937 in the village of Edde, Lebanon) is a Lebanese-born Maronite Catholic hierarch who served as a bishop of the Maronite Catholic Eparchy of San Charbel in Buenos Aires from 1990 to 2012.

== Biography ==
On 29 August 1964, Merhi was ordained priest and became Chaplain of the MLM. His appointment as first bishop of the Maronite Catholic Eparchy of San Charbel in Buenos Aires took place on 5 October 1990. Maronite Patriarch of Antioch, Nasrallah Pierre Sfeir consecrated him bishop on 2 December 1990. His co-consecrators were Bishop Georges Abi-Saber, OLM, from Canada and Roland Aboujaoudé, auxiliary bishop of Antioch. Merhi was installed as eparchy on 17 March 1991. As a participant in the Special Assembly of the Synod of Bishops for the Middle East, in October 2010, he stressed the need for peace between Christians and Muslims, because, as he pointed out, they are all children of Abraham.

On 17 April 2013, Pope Francis accepted his resignation.
