= Maronite Convent, Jerusalem =

Coordinates: 31.77654°N 35.2296°E

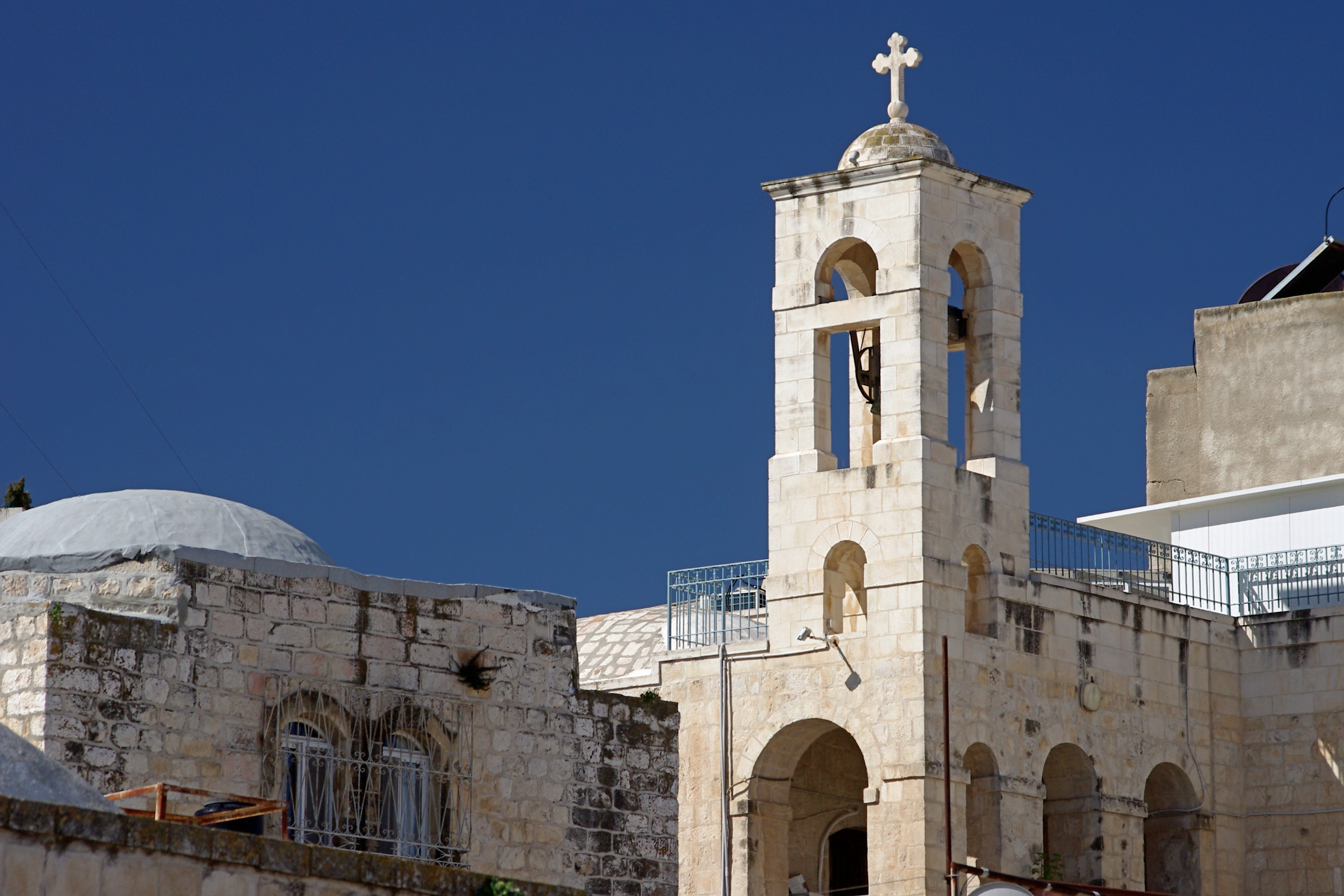
The convent's bell tower

The Maronite Convent, also known as the Maronite Church or the Maronite Monastery, is a Maronite Catholic convent located on Maronite Convent Street 25 near the Jaffa Gate in the Armenian quarter of the Old City of Jerusalem. Erected in 1895 as the only Maronite place of worship in the Old City of Jerusalem, it effectively serves as the cathedra of the Maronite Catholic Patriarchal Exarchate of Jerusalem and Palestine along with official residence of its archbishop.

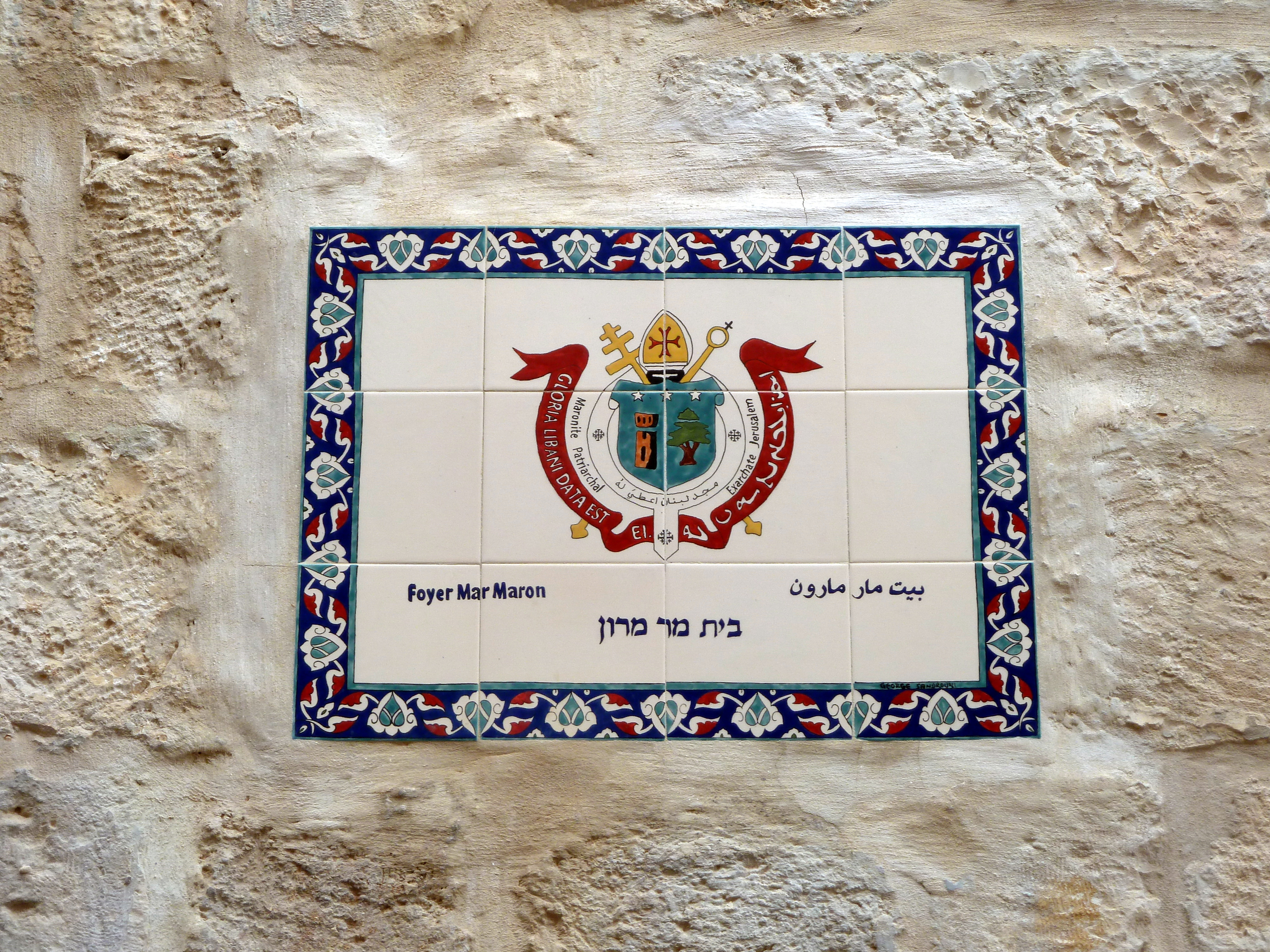
Pilgrim's guesthouse

The compound, based on the residence built for the British consul in 1851, was later used as a hospital run by the Kaiserswerth Deaconesses, a German Protestant congregation, before being bought by Lebanese Maronites in the early 1890s. It comprises a Maronite chapel, as well as the Pilgrim's Guesthouse of Saint Maron (French: Foyer de Saint Maron), maintained by Maronite nuns from the Congregation of Saint Therese of the Child Jesus. In addition to that, it hosts a pilgrim organisation called Peregrinatio Jubilaum Jerusalem (PJJ), set up in 1999 by the Maronite Church in charge of organising tours.
