= Joseph Khoury =

Joseph El Khoury
- Eparch of Saint Maron of Montreal
- Native name: جوزيف الخوري
- Church: Maronite Church
- Diocese: Eparchy of Saint Maron of Montreal
- In office: 11 November 1996 – 10 January 2013
- Predecessor: Georges Abi-Saber
- Successor: Paul Marwan Tabet
- Previous post: Titular Eparch of Chonochora (1993-1996)

Orders
- Ordination: 19 December 1964 by Gregorio Pietro Agagianian
- Consecration: 4 September 1993 by Nasrallah Boutros Sfeir

Personal details
- Born: 1 November 1936 Behwaita (east of Miziara), Mandatory Lebanese Republic, French Empire
- Died: 17 November 2016 (aged 80)

Joseph El Khoury (1 November 1936 – 17 November 2016) was an emeritus bishop of the Maronite Catholic Eparchy of Saint Maron of Montreal.

== Life ==
Khoury was born in Behwaita, Lebanon. He was ordained as a priest on 19 December 1964, after studying at the Jesuits of Saint Maron of Ghazier as well as the University of Rome and the Gregorian University. He became a specialist in the history of contemporary atheism and subsequently earned a doctorate in canon and civil law at the Pontifical Lateran University.

He worked at the Roman Rota from 1969 until 1972, and represented the Holy See in the Middle East for the Congregation for the Oriental Churches from 1969 to 1993. He is a member of the Congregation for Divine Worship and the Discipline of the Sacraments from 1975 to 1995, and of the Pontifical Council for Interreligious Dialogue since 1976. He taught at the Institute Regina Mundi for twenty years until 1996.

He has also published books about Islamic philosophy and canon law.

On 29 April 1993, Pope John Paul II appointed him apostolic visitor to the Maronites in Western Europe and Northern Europe, auxiliary bishop and titular bishop of the see of Chonochora, then was consecrated as Bishop on 4 September of that year by Maronite Patriarch of Antioch Nasrallah Boutros Sfeir and the bishops Roland Aboujaoudé, auxiliary bishop of Antioch and Gabriel Toubia, Archeparch of Tripoli being his co-consecrators. On 11 November 1996, Pope John Paul II appointed him as bishop of the Maronite Catholic Eparchy of Saint Maron of Montreal.

On the Assembly of Quebec Bishops, Bishop Khoury sits on the committee of inter-cultural relations and the commission of Canon Law.

His episcopate saw the erection of the new cathedral. Its construction has undergone problems of financing and Monsignor Khoury intervened personally to ensure completion of the project.

On 28 February 2005, Bishop Khoury signed an open letter with local Sunni, Shiite and Druze religious leaders objecting to the amendment in the definition of marriage by then Canadian Prime Minister Paul Martin. In October of the same year, he organized an Iftar with the local Islamic community of Montreal, Quebec.

On 10 January 2013 Pope Benedict XVI accepted his age-related resignation.

== Quotations ==
- "Finding work is a grace. Provide work that is a responsibility that seals the social union and peace in the world of work."
- "In countries of immigration, the bishop, pastor of the faithful from the churches of the East, has the task to "mature as communion" a portion of the People of God entrusted to a bishop in countries of emigration and this, following three dimensions of communion."

== See also ==
- Maronite Church
