= Maronite Catholic Eparchy of Saint Charbel in Buenos Aires =

Maronite Catholic ecclesiastical territory in Argentina

Eparchy of San Charbel in Buenos Aires Eparchia Sancti Sarbelii Bonaërensis Maronitarum Eparquía de San Charbel en Buenos Aires

Location
- Country: Argentina
- Ecclesiastical province: Buenos Aires

Statistics
- Population: (as of 2010); 750,000
- Parishes: 4

Information
- Denomination: Catholic Church
- Sui iuris church: Maronite Church
- Rite: West Syro-Antiochene Rite
- Established: 5 October 1990 (36 years ago)
- Cathedral: St. Maron's Cathedral, Buenos Aires
- Patron saint: St Charbel Makhluf

Current leadership
- Pope: Leo XIV
- Patriarch: Bechara Boutros al-Rahi
- Eparch: Habib Chamieh
- Metropolitan Archbishop: Jorge Ignacio García Cuerva
- Bishops emeritus: Charbel Georges Merhi

Website
- www.misionlibanesa.com.ar

The Eparchy of San Charbel in Buenos Aires (Spanish: Eparquía de San Charbel en Buenos Aires; Latin: Eparchia Sancti Sarbelii Bonaërensis Maronitarum) is a Maronite Church ecclesiastical territory or eparchy of the Catholic Church in Argentina. It is a suffragan eparchy in the ecclesiastical province of the metropolitan Archdiocese of Buenos Aires, a Latin Church archdiocese.

It has a cathedral, the Catedral San Marón, located episcopal see of Buenos Aires. In 2010 there were 750,000 members. It is governed by Habib Chamieh, Mariamite Maronite Order.

== History ==
From July 5, 1901 began to come to Argentina the first Lebanese Maronite missionaries who founded the first mission in the Lebanese diaspora in South America.

The Eparchy of San Charbel was established by Pope John Paul II on 5 October 1990, on territory previously without proper ordinary of the particular church. It is named after its patron saint, Charbel Makhluf.

== Territory and statistics ==
The jurisdiction of the eparchy extends to all Maronite Catholic faithful living in Argentina. Its eparchial seat is the Argentine capital, Buenos Aires, where is located the Saint Maron Cathedral.

It is not exempt, nor a hierarchical part of the Maronite patriarchal ecclesiastical structure, but a suffragan see in the ecclesiastical province of the Roman Rite Metropolitan Archdiocese of Buenos Aires in Argentina, like its Ukrainian Catholic counterpart, the Eparchy Santa María del Patrocinio en Buenos Aires.

The Christians of this diocese are mostly emigrants and are originally from Lebanon. Their naming is originated from Saint Maron the founder of the Maronite Church. The Eparchy of Saint Charbel of Buenos Aires counted some 750,000 Lebanese Maronite Catholics of prevalent Arab Christian origin in 2010 and there were four parishes.

== Episcopal ordinaries ==
Eparchs of San Charbel of Buenos Aires

- Charbel Georges Merhi, Congregation of the Lebanese Maronite Missionaries (M.L.M.) (5 October 1990 – 17 April 2013)
- Habib Chamieh, Mariamite Maronite Order (O.M.M., Aleppians) (22 November 2019 – present)
  - Apostolic Administrator from 17 April 2013 to 22 November 2019

== See also ==
- Christianity in Lebanon

== Sources and external links ==
- GigaCatholic
- Catholic Hierarchy
