= Rafqa Pietra Choboq Ar-Rayès =

Lebanese Maronite nun and saint (1832–1914)

Saint Rafqa (Rafka) O.L.M.
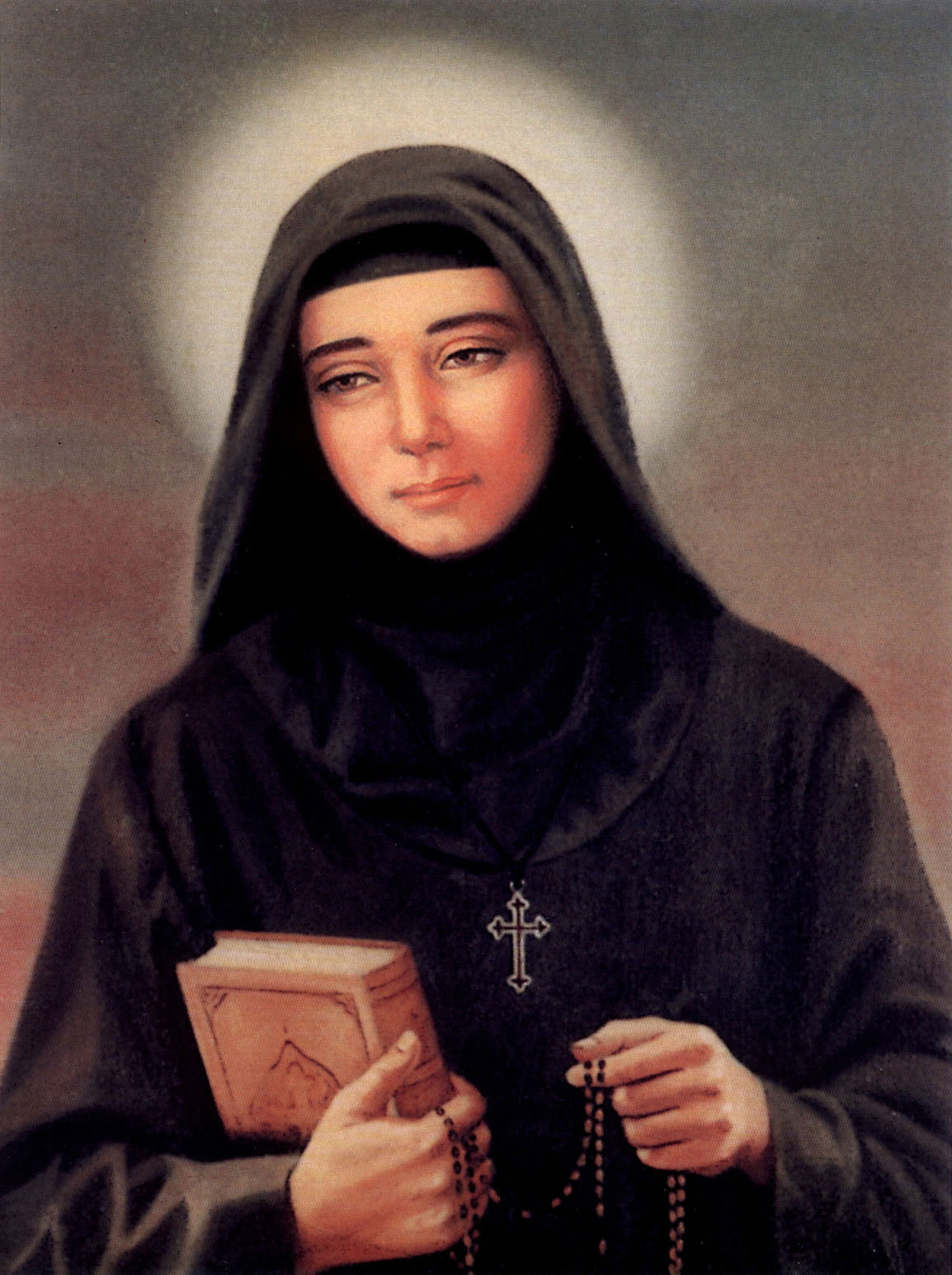

Monastic
- Born: 29 June 1832; Himlaya, Mount Lebanon Emirate
- Died: 23 March 1914 (aged 81); Monastery of Saint Joseph, Jrebta, Lebanon
- Venerated in: Catholic Church
- Beatified: November 16, 1985 by Pope John Paul II
- Canonized: June 10, 2001, Saint Peter's Basilica, Vatican City by Pope John Paul II
- Feast: March 23

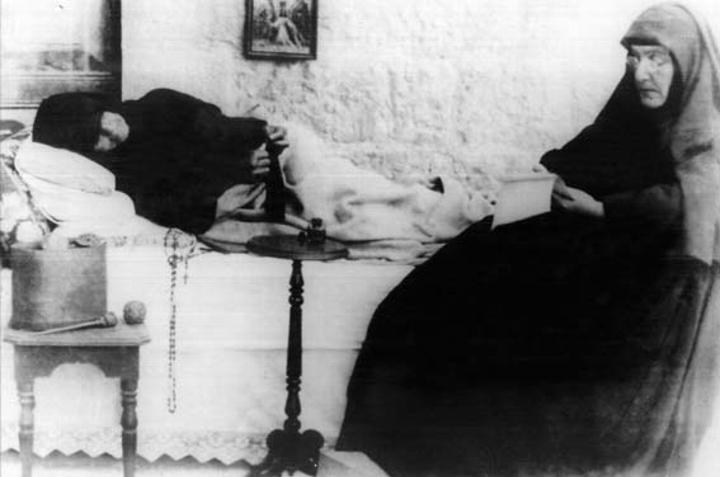
A bedridden Saint Rafqa and a companion nun, before her death in 1914

Rafqa Pietra Chobok (Arabic: رفقا بطرسيّة شبق, June 29, 1832 – March 23, 1914), also known as Saint Rafka and Saint Rebecca, was a Lebanese Maronite nun who was canonized by Pope John Paul II on June 10, 2001.

She is a patron of lost parents and the sick.

== Birth and youth ==
Rafka was born in Himlaya, in Matn District, on June 29, 1832, the Feast of Saints Peter and Paul, the only child of Saber Mourad El Rayess and Rafqa Gemayel, and was baptised Boutrossieh (the Arabic feminine of Peter). Her mother died when she was seven years old. In 1843, her father experienced financial difficulties and sent her to work as a servant for four years in Damascus at the home of Assaad Al-Badawi. She returned home in 1847 to find that her father had remarried.

When Boutrossieh was 14 years old, her stepmother wanted her to marry her brother, while her maternal aunt wanted her to marry her son. Boutrossieh did not want to marry either man, and this caused much discord in her family. One day, while she was coming back from the fountain holding her jar, she overheard them arguing. She asked God to help her deal with the problem. She then decided to become a nun and went straight to the Convent of Our Lady of Liberation at Bikfaya. Boutrossieh's father and stepmother tried to take her back home but she refused. They returned home dismayed, and from then on never saw her again.

Boutrossieh's kinsman, Joseph Gemayel, and his family founded a new religious institute for women that provided them with full-time education as well as religious instruction. Boutrossieh's name, Pierine (in French), was listed last among the first four candidates of the Daughters of Mary of the Immaculate Conception ("Mariamettes", in French) in Gemayel's notebook dated January 1, 1853. She was 21.

== Mariamette Sisters ==
In 1860, while still stationed in Ghazir, Rafqa's superiors sent her on a temporary posting to Deir al-Qamar, in the Chouf District of the Mount Lebanon Governorate, where she helped the Jesuit mission. In less than two months, the Druze killed 7,771 people and destroyed 360 villages, 560 churches, 28 schools, and 42 convents. Rafqa saved one child's life by hiding him in the skirts of her habit as he was being chased by some soldiers and she was deeply affected by the massacres.

Following a year of postulancy, Rafqa received the habit of her congregation on the Feast of Saint Joseph, March 19, 1861. She took her first temporary religious vows on March 19, 1862 at the age of thirty. Sister Rafqa's first assignment in the congregation was in charge of the kitchen service in the Jesuit school in Ghazir, where she spent seven years. She was put in charge of the workers and tasked with giving them religious instruction in a spinning mill in Scerdanieh, where she remained for two months. In her free time, Sister Rafqa studied Arabic, calligraphy, and mathematics.

Two years later, Sister Rafqa was sent to teach at Byblos, where she remained for one year before going to Maad in the Jbeil District to establish a school there at the request of Antoun Issa, a prominent citizen.

In 1871, the Mariamettes were merged with another religious institute to form the Order of the Sacred Hearts of Jesus and Mary. The religious sisters were given the option to join the new congregation, transfer to a different one, or return to secular life. Sister Rafqa chose to become a cloistered nun rather than a teaching Sister, and after praying in the Church of Saint George, made the decision to join the Baladita Order (now the Lebanese Maronite Order of St. Anthony, founded in 1695. She told Antoun Issa of her decision, and he offered to pay the requisite convent dowry.

That same night, Rafqa dreamed of three men: one had a white beard, one was dressed like a soldier, and the third was an old man. She recounted, "One of the men said to me, 'Become a nun in the Baladita Order'. I woke up very happy ... and went to Antoun Issa, bursting with joy ... and I told him about my dream." Antoun identified the men as Anthony of Qozhaia (Saint Anthony the Abbot) from whom the order was inspired, the soldier was Saint George, to whom the Maad Church was dedicated, and the third could only be a Baladita monk. Rafqa decided to leave immediately for the Monastery of Saint Simon al-Qarn in the village of Aitou. Issa also gave her the promised dowry, as well as a letter of recommendation to the archbishop.

== A nun of the Lebanese Maronite Order ==
=== Monastery of Saint Simon ===
On July 12, 1871, at the age of thirty-nine, Rafqa began her noviciate in the new monastery and on August 25, 1873, she "professed her perpetual vows of poverty, chastity and obedience in the spirit of the strict Rule of the Baladita Order". She took on the new name from her mother: Rafqa (Rebecca), the name of Abraham's great-niece and wife of his son, Isaac.

The Monastery of Saint Simon was situated on a high altitude, where the winters were very harsh. The nuns followed a very rigid daily schedule throughout the year, as prayer and manual labour became the rule of their daily lives. The nuns planted and harvested vegetables and grain in the surrounding fields, cultivated silkworms, and sewed vestments for churches. Rafqa remained in this monastery until 1897.

==== Illness ====
In 1885, Rafqa decided not to join the nuns for a walk around the monastery. In her autobiographical account she wrote,

It was the first Sunday of the Rosary. I did not accompany them. Before leaving each of the nuns came and said to me, 'Pray for me sister.' There were some who asked me to say seven decades of the Rosary ... I went to the Church and started to pray. Seeing that I was in good health and that I had never been sick in my life, I prayed to God in this way, 'Why, O my God, have you distance yourself from me and have abandoned me. You have never visited me with sickness! Have you perhaps abandoned me?'"

Rafqa continued in her account to her superior, the next night after the prayer "At the moment of sleeping I felt a most violent pain spreading above my eyes to the point that I reached the state you see me in, blind and paralyzed, and as I myself had asked for sickness I could not allow myself to complain or murmur."

The mother superior sent Rafqa to Tripoli, where she had a painful medical examination. She suffered two years, with several doctors concluding nothing could be done. Upon the persuasion of a priest named Estefan, Rafqa consulted a visiting American doctor who strongly suggested her affected right eye be removed. Estefan later recounted, "Before the operation I asked the doctor to anesthetize the eye so that Rafqa would not feel any pain but she refused. The doctor made her sit down and pushed a long scalpel ... into her eye ... the eye popped out and fell on the ground, palpitating slightly.... Rafqa didn't complain ... but only said, 'in communion with Christ's Passion'." The pain was then all concentrated in her left eye and nothing could be done.

Gradually, Rafqa became blind. She continued to experience intense pain in her head, but considered this an opportunity to share in Jesus' Passion. Rafqa did not let the pain isolate her from the community, as she continued to spin wool and cotton, as well as knitting stockings for the other sisters and joining in choral prayer.

Due to the harsh winters at the Monastery of Saint Simon, Rafqa was permitted to spend the colder months on the Lebanese coast as a guest of the Daughters of Charity, and then in a house of the Maronite Order. Unable to observe the Rule at these locales, Rafqa asked to be taken to the Mar Elias El Ras Monastery in Mazraat El Ras, near Jeita, which belonged to her order.

=== Monastery of Saint Joseph ===
In 1897, the Lebanese Maronite Order decided to build the Monastery of Saint Joseph al Dahr in Jrabta, Batroun. Rafqa was one of six nuns, led by Mother Ursula Doumit, who were sent to the new monastery.

By 1899, she was completely blind and paralysed. She was confined to bed and spent her time knitting socks. Near the end of her life, she was asked by Mother Ursula if she would like to see; Rafqa prayed to be able to see for an hour, and this prayer was answered.

On March 23, 1914, four minutes after receiving the Last Rites and the plenary indulgence, Rafqa died. Her body was buried in the monastery cemetery and was later transferred to the monastery chapel.

== Beatification and canonization ==
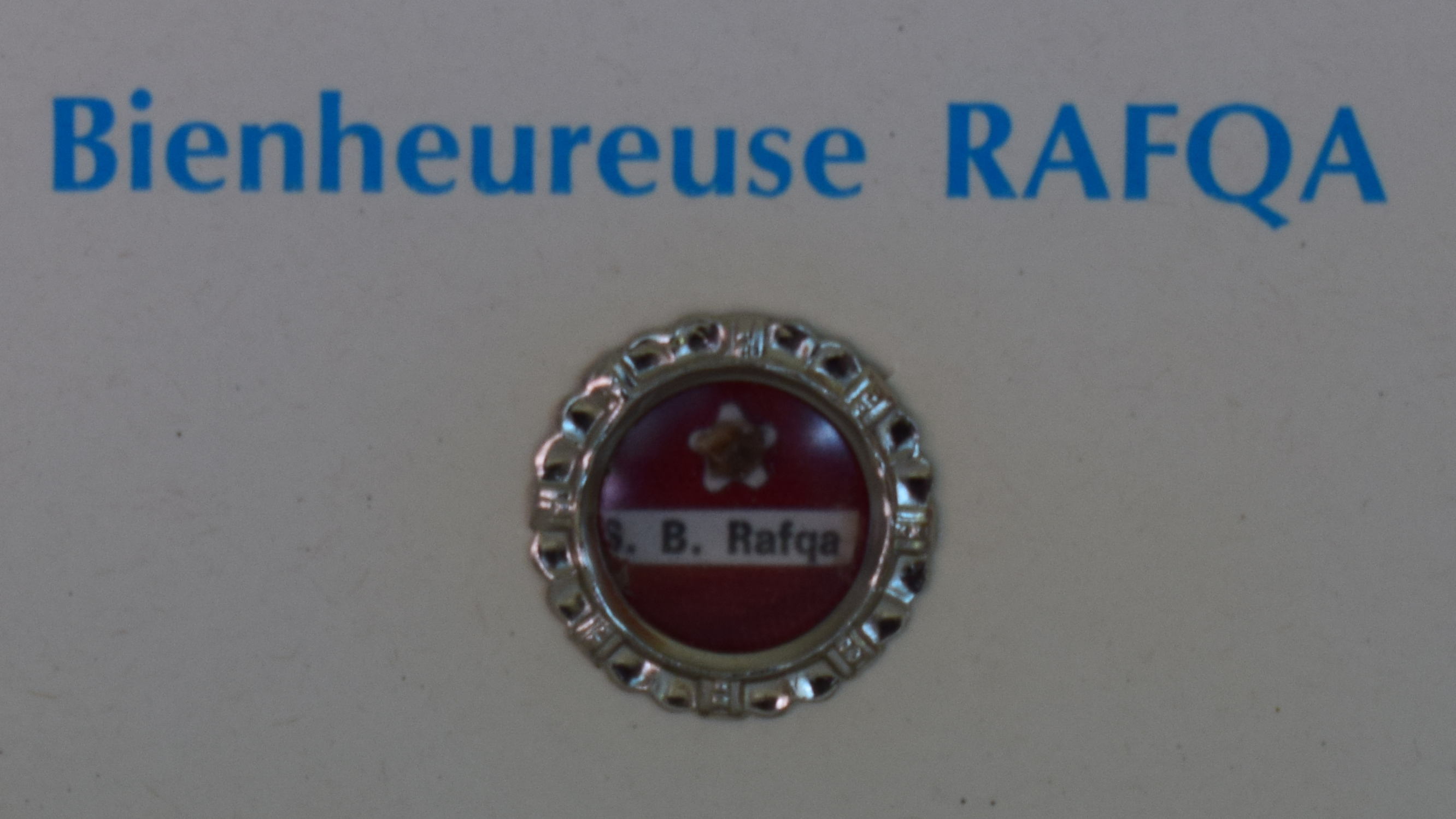
A relic of Saint Rafqa (here still “Blessed”) at St. Raymond Maronite Cathedral (St. Louis, Missouri)

The preliminary investigations began at a local level on 4 April 1929 and sometime thereafter, Rafqa was declared a Servant of God.

On June 9, 1984, the vigil of Pentecost, in the presence of the Pope John Paul II, the decree approving the miracle of Elizabeth Ennakl, said to have been completely cured of uterine cancer in 1938 at Rafqa’s tomb, was promulgated.

On November 16, 1985, Pope John Paul II declared Rafqa Al Rayess a Blessed, and on June 10, 2001, he proclaimed her a saint at a solemn ceremony in Vatican City.
