= St. Louis the King Cathedral, Haifa =

St. Louis the King Cathedral
- كاتدرائية القديس لويس الملك
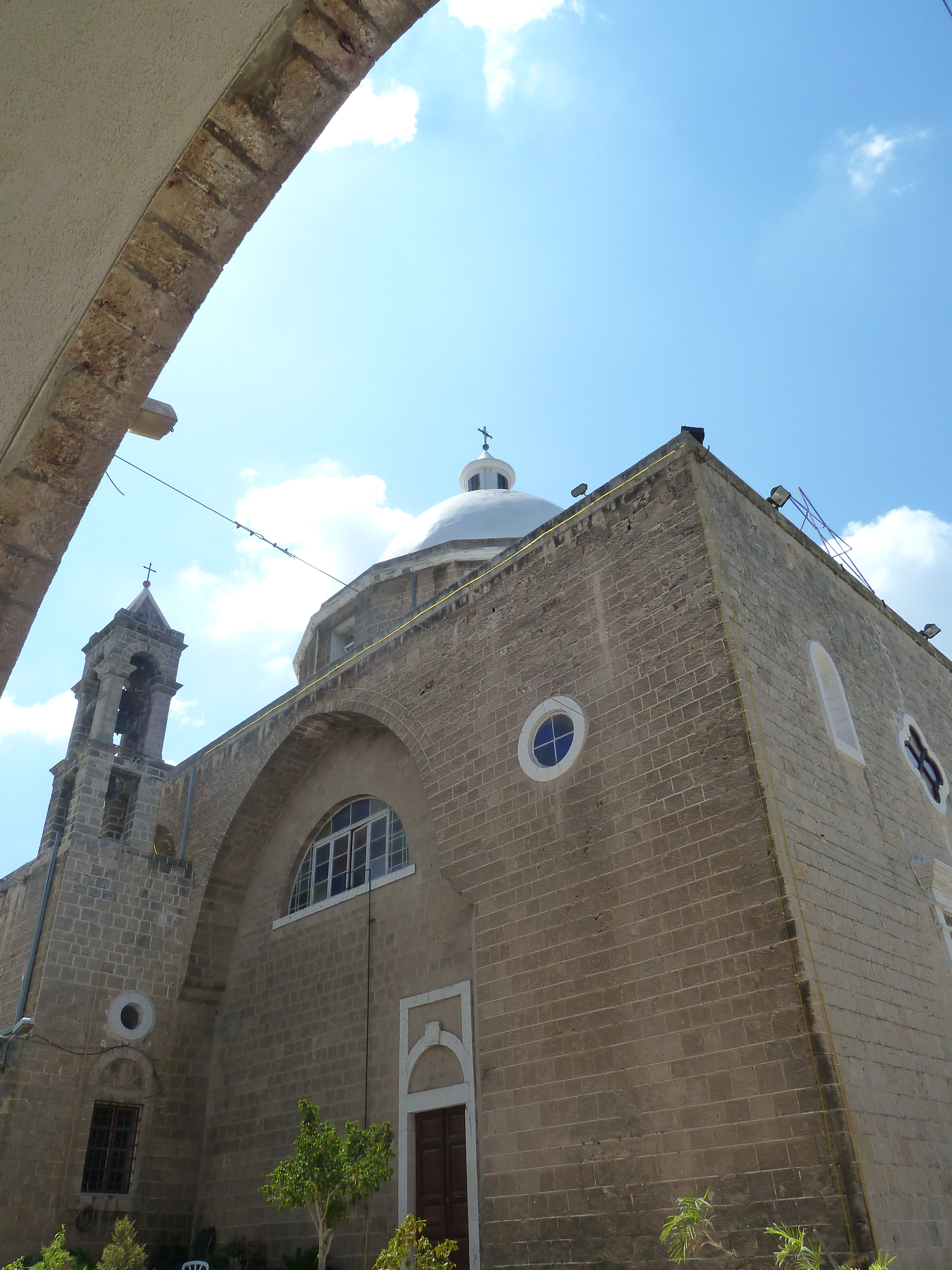
- St. Louis the King Cathedral
- Location: Haifa
- Country: Israel
- Denomination: Catholic (Maronite rite)

The St. Louis the King Cathedral (Arabic: كاتدرائية القديس لويس الملك, Hebrew: קתדרלת לואי הקדוש), or the Maronite Church of St. Louis, is a Catholic church of the Maronite Eastern rite located in Haifa, in northern Israel.

== History ==
It serves as the headquarters of the Maronite Catholic Archeparchy of Haifa and the Holy Land (Archieparchia Ptolemaidensis Maronitarum in Terra Sancta) which was raised to its current status in 1996 by decision of Pope John Paul II.

It was built by Ibrahim Nasrallah and Salim Khoury, as its name suggests was dedicated to St. Louis IX of France (1214-1270). Construction began in December 1883 and the foundations were laid in January 1884. The work was interrupted on August 24, 1885, but resumed in August 1887 and the church was completed in November 1889.

== See also ==
- Catholic Church in Israel
- Louis IX of France

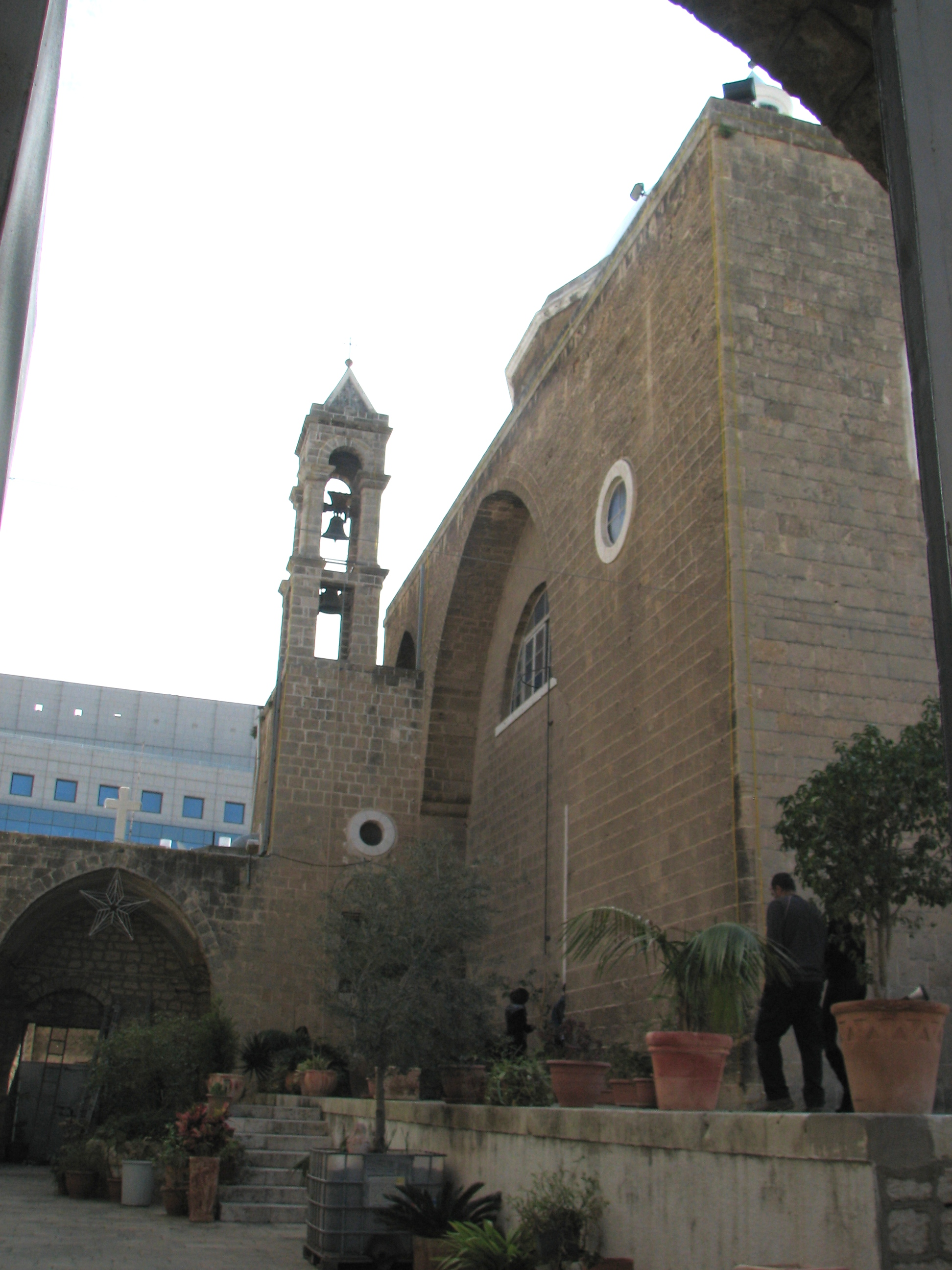
Another View
