= Joseph Nafaa =

- Auxiliary Eparch of Joubbé, Sarba and Jounieh
- Native name: چوزيف نافع
- Church: Maronite Church
- Diocese: Eparchy of Joubbé, Sarba and Jounieh
- Appointed: 17 June 2017
- Other post: Titular Eparch of Aradus (since 2016)
- Previous post: Curial Bishop of Antioch (2016-2017)

Orders
- Ordination: 14 September 1995
- Consecration: 3 August 2016 by Bechara Boutros al-Rahi

Personal details
- Born: 14 March 1969 (age 57) Andaket, North Governorate, Lebanon

Joseph Nafaa (born March 14, 1969, in Andket, near Tripoli, Lebanon) is a clergyman of the Maronite Church and Curial Bishop of the Patriarchate of Antioch.

== Life ==
Joseph Nafaa received on 14 September 1995 the sacrament of Holy Orders for the Archeparchy of Tripoli.

The Synod of the Maronite Church of Antioch chose him as Curial Bishop to the Patriarchate. Pope Francis confirmed his election on June 17, 2016, and named him Titular Bishop of Aradus.

His episcopal ordination was performed by the patriarch of Antioch, Bechara Boutros al-Rahi, on August 3, 2016, and his co-consecrators were Georges Bou-Jaoudé and Paul Nabil El-Sayah.

On 17 Jun 2017 Nafaa was appointed Auxiliary Bishop of Maronite Catholic Eparchy of Joubbé Lebanon.
