= Merhi =

Merhi is a surname. Notable people with the surname include:

- Charbel Georges Merhi (born 1937), Spanish bishop
- Fawzi Merhi (born 1950), Lebanese fencer
- Jalal Merhi (born 1967), Brazilian-born Lebanese-Canadian martial artist, actor and filmmaker
- Joseph Merhi (1912–2006), Egyptian bishop
- Roberto Merhi (born 1991), Spanish racing driver
- Yucef Merhi (born 1977), Venezuelan artist, poet and computer programmer
- Zaher O. Merhi, American endocrinologist
