= Habib Chamieh =

Lebanese Catholic priest (born 1966)

Habib Chamieh OMM
- Eparch of Saint Charbel in Buenos Aires
- Native name: حبيب شاميه
- Church: Maronite Church
- Diocese: Eparchy of Saint Charbel in Buenos Aires
- Appointed: 22 November 2019
- Predecessor: Charbel Georges Merhi
- Previous posts: Titular Eparch of Nomentum (2013-2019); Apostolic Administrator of Saint Charbel in Buenos Aires (2013-2019)

Orders
- Ordination: 14 August 1992
- Consecration: 25 May 2013 by Bechara Boutros al-Rahi

Personal details
- Born: 7 October 1966 (age 59) Beirut, Lebanon

Habib Chamieh, OMM (born 7 October 1966) is Bishop of the Maronite Catholic Eparchy of San Charbel in Buenos Aires.

== Biography ==
Habib Chamieh was born in Beirut, Lebanon, on 7 October 1966. He joined the OMM and on 7 September 1991 made his perpetual vows. Chamieh received on 14 August 1992 his ordination to the priesthood.

On 17 April 2013, Pope Francis appointed him titular bishop of Nomentum and Apostolic Administrator of the Eparchy of San Charbel of Buenos Aires. Maronite Patriarch of Antioch Bechara Boutros al-Rahi, OMM, ordained him bishop on May 25 of that year. His co-consecrators were the Emeritus Bishop of the diocese of San Charbel in Buenos Aires, Charbel Georges Merhi, MLM and Emeritus Bishop of Cairo, François Eid, OMM.

On 22 November 2019, Pope Francis named him Bishop of that Eparchy.
