= Georges Abi-Saber =

Lebanese Maronite Christian priest

Georges Abi-Saber, O.L.M.
- Bishop of Eparchy of Saint Maron of Montreal Maronites (emeritus)
- Church: Maronite Church
- See: Eparchy of Saint Maron of Montreal Maronites
- In office: 1990 - 1996
- Predecessor: Elias Shaheen
- Successor: Joseph Khoury
- Previous post: Prelate

Orders
- Ordination: July 16, 1952

Personal details
- Born: 12 May 1923 Wadi Sette, Lebanon
- Died: 26 August 2015 (aged 92)

Georges Abi-Saber, O.L.M. (May 12, 1923 – August 26, 2015) was a Lebanese Maronite Church hierarch, who served as eparch of the Maronite Catholic Eparchy of Latakia and Maronite Catholic Eparchy of Saint Maron of Montreal.

== Life ==
Abi-Saber was born in Wadi Sette, Lebanon and was ordained a priest on July 16, 1952 from the religious order of the Lebanese Maronite Order. He was appointed bishop of the Maronite Catholic Eparchy of Latakia by Pope Paul VI on August 4, 1977 and ordained bishop on November 12, 1977. Abi-Saber was consecrated eparch by the Maronite Patriarch of Antioch, Anthony Peter Khoraish on 23 November 1977 and his co-consecrators were Joseph Salamé, Archbishop of Aleppo, and Ibrahim Hélou, bishop of Sidon.

On 2 May 1986 Abi-Saber was named auxiliary bishop of Antioch of the Maronites as well as titular bishop of Aradus by Pope John Paul II. He was appointed bishop of the Maronite Catholic Eparchy of Saint Maron of Montreal on November 23, 1990 and resigned from the position on February 7, 1996 from health reasons.

Eparch Georges Abi-Saber died on 26 August 2015.

== See also ==
- Maronite Christianity in Lebanon
