= Paul Nabil El-Sayah =

- Curial Bishop Emeritus of Antioch
- Native name: بولس نبيل الصياح
- Church: Maronite Church
- See: Patriarchate of Antioch
- In office: 25 June 2011 – 17 June 2016
- Predecessor: Samir Mazloum
- Successor: Joseph Nafaa
- Previous posts: Archeparch of Haifa and the Holy Land, Patriarchal Exarch of Jerusalem and Palestine, Patriarchal Exarch of Jordan (1996-2011)

Orders
- Ordination: 6 August 1967
- Consecration: 5 October 1996 by Nasrallah Boutros Sfeir

Personal details
- Born: 26 December 1939 (age 86) Aïn el Kharroubé (near Bikfaya), Mandatory Lebanese Republic, French Empire

Paul Nabil El-Sayah (in Arabic: بولس نبيل الصياح; born 26 December 1939 in Aïn el Kharroubé, Lebanon) is an Archeparch of the Maronite Church and Curial Bishop of the Maronite Catholic Patriarchate of Antioch.

== Life ==
Paul Nabil El-Sayah studied at the Seminary of Ghazir before attending his studies in philosophy at Saint Joseph University in Beirut. El-Sayah studied theology in Ireland where he obtained his graduation. He received on 6 August 1967, the sacrament of Holy Orders. On June 8, 1996 El-Sayah was named by the Synod of the Maronites to the Archeparchy of Haifa and the Holy Land in the Northern Israel in the Galilee as well as to Maronite Catholic Patriarchal Exarchate of Jordan and Maronite Catholic Patriarchal Exarchate of Jerusalem and Palestine by Pope John Paul II. He received his episcopal consecration on October 5, 1996 by Nasrallah Pierre Cardinal Sfeir, Maronite Patriarch of Antioch and his co-consecrators were Boutros Gemayel, archbishop of the Archeparchy of Cyprus, and Roland Aboujaoudé, Auxiliary bishop of Antioch.

Paul Nabil El-Sayah called for a more consensual coexistence of Christian denominations in the Holy Land.

In 2010, he became Apostolic visitor of OMM of the Blessed Virgin Mary.

On June 6, 2011, Paul Nabil El-Sayah by the Maronite Synod presided by Patriarch Bechara Boutros al-Rahi, OMM was elected in Lebanon Curial Bishop of patriarchate. Pope Benedict XVI gave El-Sayah by his new job the personal title of archbishop. His confirmation as Archeparch was on 25 June of the same year.
