= Maronite Catholic Patriarchal Exarchate of Jordan =

Eastern Catholic missionary jurisdiction in Jordan

Patriarchal Exarchate of Jordan (Maronite)
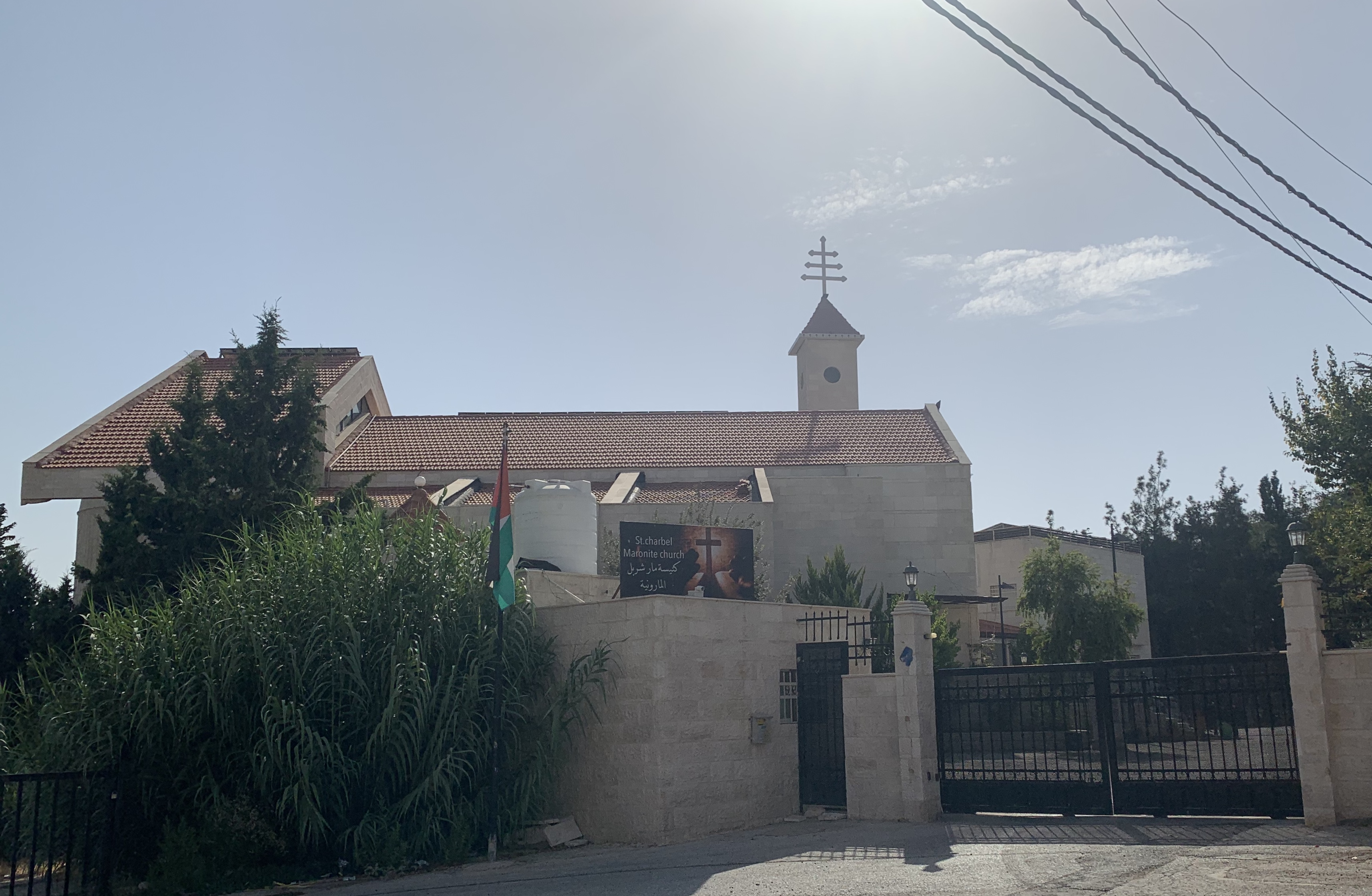
- St. Charbel Maronite Church

Location
- Country: Jordan
- Coordinates: 31°52′35″N 35°52′49″E

Statistics
- Population: Catholics: (as of 2018); 1,000
- Parishes: 2

Information
- Sui iuris church: Maronite Church
- Rite: West Syro-Antiochene Rite
- Established: October 5, 1996
- Cathedral: St. Charbel Maronite Church
- Secular priests: 1

Current leadership
- Pope: Francis
- Patriarch: Bechara Boutros al-Rahi
- Patriarchal Exarch: Moussa El-Hage

Maronite Catholic Patriarchal Exarchate of Jordan is a patriarchal exarchate of the Maronite Church, immediately subject to the Patriarchate of Antioch of the Maronites. In 2018, there were 1,000 members. It is currently governed by Archeparch Moussa El-Hage, O.A.M.

== Territory and statistics ==
The Exarchate extended its jurisdiction over the Maronite Catholic faithful of Jordan, and it is seated in Amman. It includes two parishes and had 1,000 members in 2018.

== History ==
On May 5, 1985, two years after the International Eucharistic Congress held in Jerusalem, was inaugurated in the Holy Land a Patriarchal Vicariate to meet Lebanese Maronites that lived there until then directly dependent on the Maronite Catholic Archeparchy of Tyre.

The patriarchal exarchate of Jordan was erected on October 5, 1996.

Since its erection it was entrusted to the pastoral care of Archeparch of the Maronite Catholic Archeparchy of Haifa and the Holy Land, who is its in persona episcopi.

== Patriarchal Exarchs ==
- Paul Nabil El-Sayah (October 5, 1996 - June 6, 2011 appointed archbishop, personally, of the curia of the Patriarchate of Antioch of the Maronites)
- Moussa El-Hage, O.A.M., (since 16 June 2012)
