= Maronite Catholic Patriarchate of Antioch =

Eastern Catholic patriarchate in Lebanon

Maronite Catholic Patriarchate of Antioch Patriarchatus Antiochenus Maronitarum البطريركية الأنطاكية الكاثوليكية المارونية

Catholic
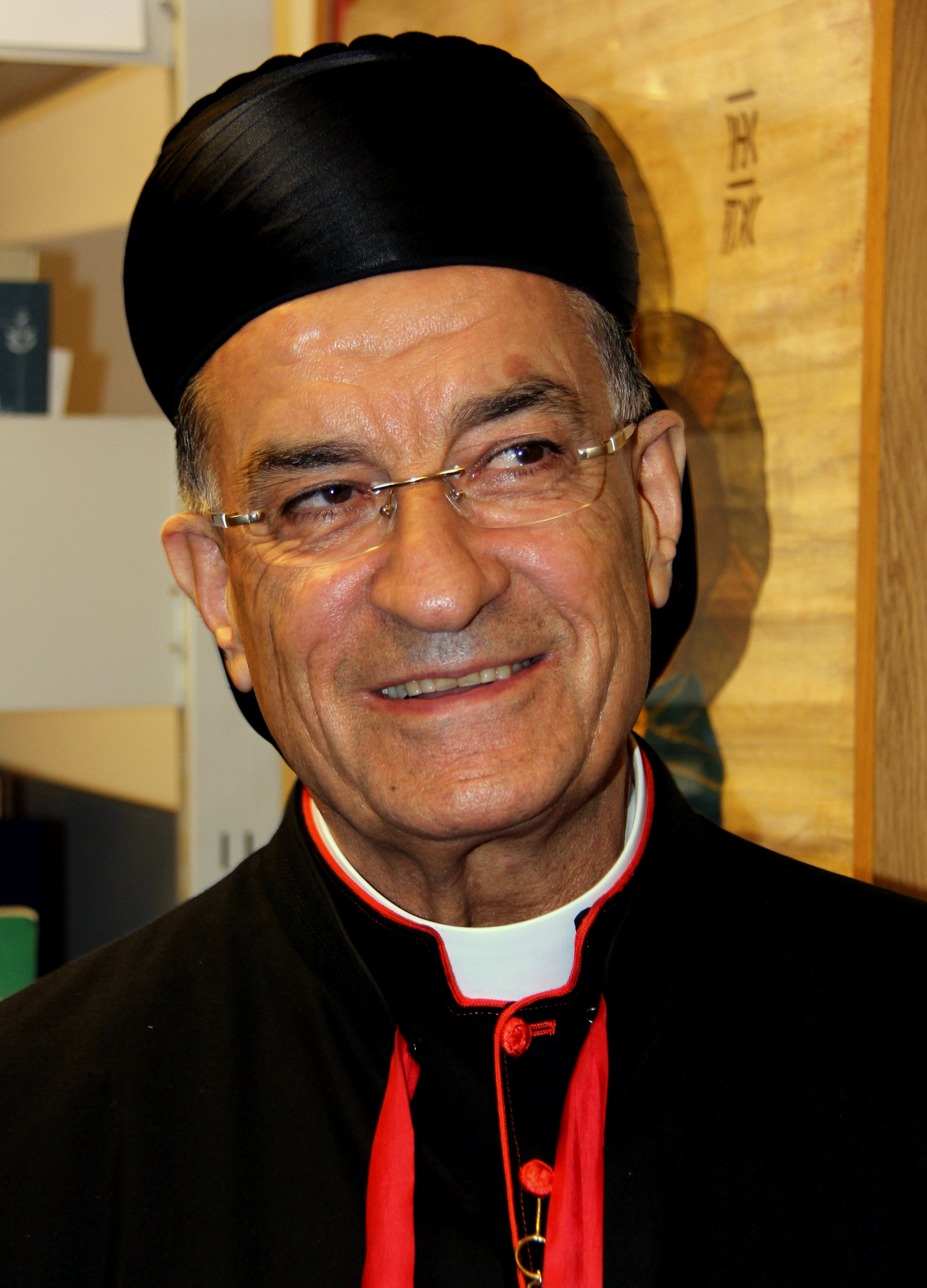
- Patriarch Béchara-Raï

- Coat of arms
- Incumbent: Bechara Boutros al-Rahi; Installed 25 March 2011

Location
- Country: Lebanon
- Headquarters: Bkerké
- Coordinates: 33°58′05″N 35°38′01″E

Information
- Denomination: Catholic Church
- Sui iuris church: Maronite Church
- Rite: West Syriac Rite
- Established: 7th century
- Language: Arabic, Aramaic (Syriac)

Current leadership
- Pope: Leo XIV
- Patriarch: Bechara Boutros al-Rahi, OMM
- Auxiliary Bishops: Joseph Nafaa; Hanna Alwan, MLM; Paul Abdel Sater; Antoine Nabil Andari
- Bishops emeritus: Samir Mazloum; Guy-Paul Noujaim; Paul Nabil El-Sayah

Website
- bkerki.org

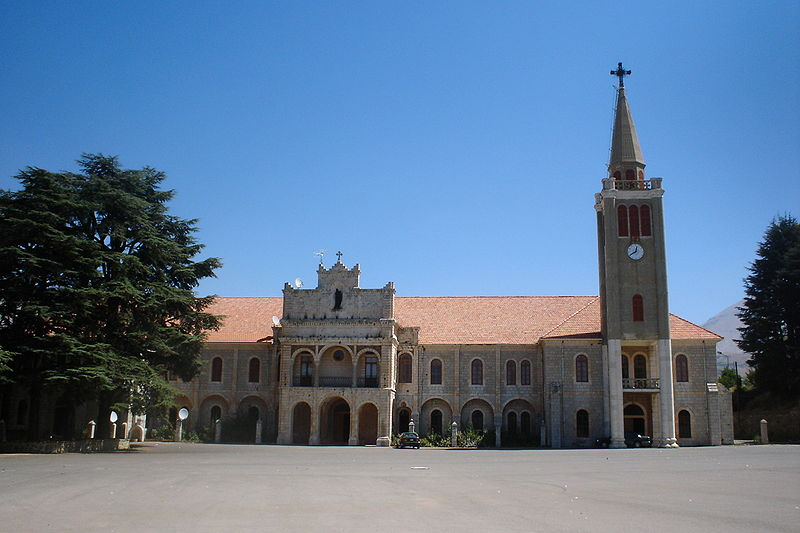
Maronite Patriarch's Summer Residence in Dimane

The Maronite Catholic Patriarchate of Antioch (Latin: Patriarchatus Antiochenus Maronitarum) is the seat of the Patriarch of the Maronite Church. It is currently governed by the Patriarch Cardinal Bechara Boutros al-Rahi, OMM.

The Maronite Church is one of several churches that lay claim to be the canonical incumbent of the ancient see of St. Peter and St. Paul in Antioch. The Syriac Catholic Church, and the Melkite Greek Catholic Church make the same claim, all of them Eastern Catholic Churches in full communion with the Holy See. The three mutually recognize each other as holding authentic patriarchates. The Greek Orthodox Church of Antioch and the Oriental Orthodox Syriac Orthodox Church claim patriarchates as well. Moreover, the Catholic Church appointed titular Latin rite patriarchs for many centuries, until the office was left vacant in 1953 and abolished in 1964 and all claims renounced.

== Territory ==
The Maronite Patriarchate extends its jurisdiction over all the Maronite faithful wherever they dwell.

The seat of the patriarchate is Bkerké in Keserwan District in Lebanon. Dimane (in Bsharri District) is the summer residence of the Patriarch. The Maronite Catholic Eparchy of Joubbé, Sarba and Jounieh is the eparchy of Maronite patriarch.

From Patriarchate of Antioch of the Maronites also depend directly:

- Maronite Catholic Patriarchal Exarchate of Jerusalem and Palestine, erected on October 5, 1996, based in Jerusalem; in 2014 they were 504 Catholics distributed in three parishes;
- Maronite Catholic Patriarchal Exarchate of Jordan, erected on October 5, 1996, based in Amman; in 2014 they were 1,000 Catholics in one parish.

The Maronite Patriarch is a member by right of the Council of Catholic Patriarchs of the East.

== Patriarchs ==
- See List of Maronite Patriarchs

== See also ==
- List of Catholic dioceses in Lebanon
- Patriarch of Antioch
- Maronite Church

== Sources ==
- Pius Bonifacius Gams, Series episcoporum Ecclesiae Catholicae, Leipzig 1931, pp. 457–458.
- Konrad Eubel, Hierarchia Catholica Medii Aevi, vol. 3, pp. 235–236; vol. 4, pp. 86–87; vol. 5, p. 89; vol. 6, p. 87.
