= Samir Mazloum =

- Curial Bishop Emeritus of Antioch
- Native name: سمير مظلوم
- Church: Maronite Church
- See: Patriarchate of Antioch
- In office: 2000 – 6 June 2011
- Other post: Titular Eparch of Callinicum (since 1996)
- Previous post: Auxiliary Bishop of Antioch (1996-2000)

Orders
- Ordination: 7 June 1964
- Consecration: 11 January 1997 by Nasrallah Boutros Sfeir

Personal details
- Born: 10 September 1934 (age 91) Kaakour, Mandatory Lebanese Republic, French Empire

Samir Mazloum (born 10 September 1934 in Kaakour, Lebanon) is a Lebanese Maronite Catholic hierarch, who served as auxiliary bishop (1996–2000) and curial bishop (2000–2011) of the Maronite Catholic Patriarchate of Antioch.

== Life ==
Samir Mazloum received on 7 June 1964 his priestly ordination. Pope John Paul II appointed him on 11 November 1996 auxiliary bishop of Antioch and titular bishop of Callinicum dei Maroniti.

Maronite Patriarch of Antioch, Cardinal Nasrallah Boutros Sfeir, ordained him on 11 January 1997 to the episcopate. His co-consecrators were Francis Mansour Zayek, Archbishop ad personam of Saint Maron in Brooklyn and Joseph Mohsen Béchara, Archbishop of Antelias.

In 2000 Mazloum was appointed Curial Bishop of Antioch. On 6 June 2011 Pope Benedict XVI accepted his age-related resignation.
