= Maronite Catholic Archeparchy of Haifa and the Holy Land =

Eastern Catholic archeparchy in Israel

Archeparchy of Haifa and the Holy Land (Maronite) Archieparchia Ptolemaidensis Maronitarum
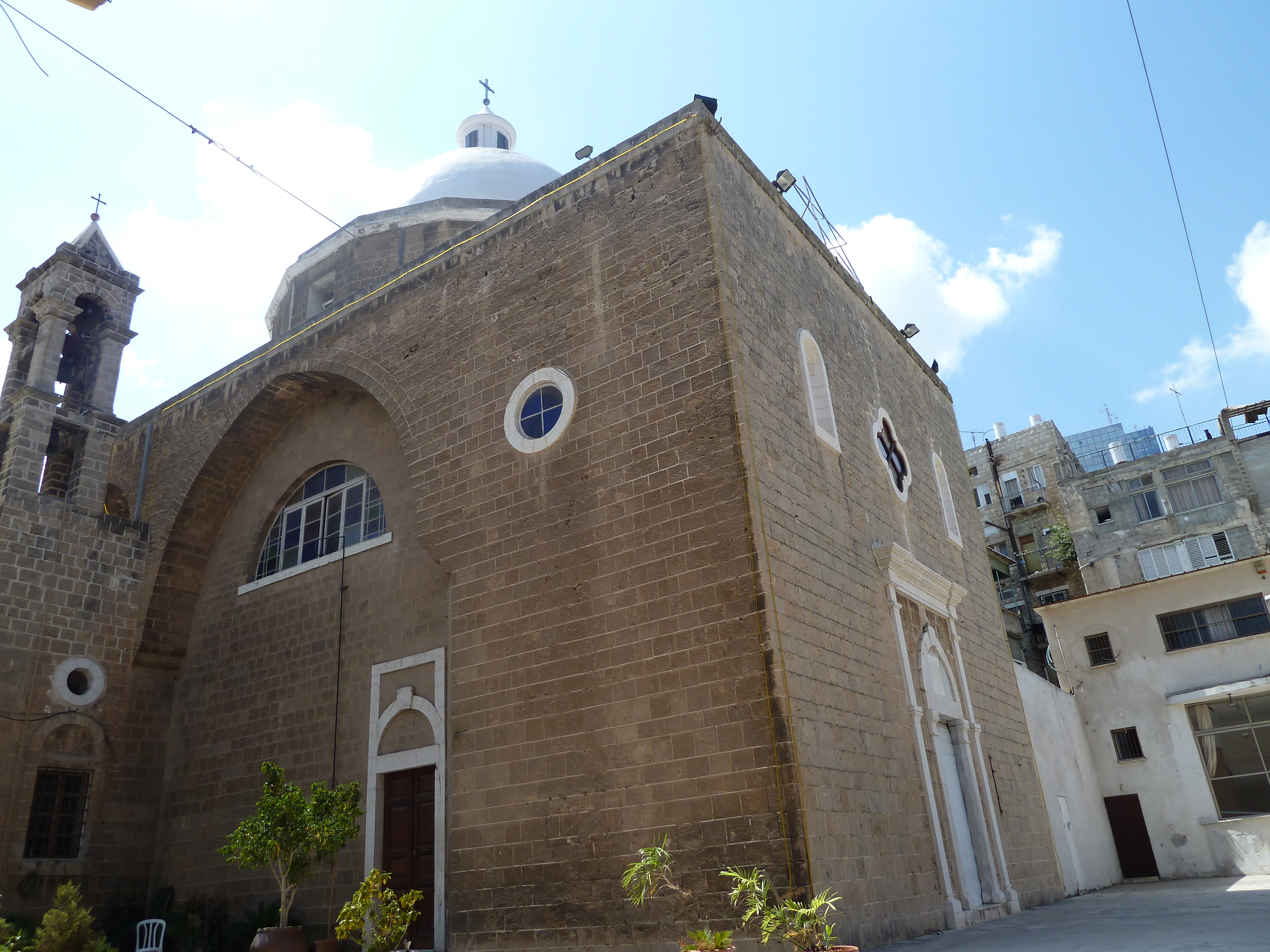
- St. Louis the King Cathedral, Haifa

Location
- Country: Israel
- Coordinates: 32°49′02″N 34°59′59″E

Statistics
- Population: (as of 2019); 10,000
- Parishes: 8 parishes, 3 missions

Information
- Sui iuris church: Maronite Church
- Rite: West Syro-Antiochene Rite
- Established: June 8, 1996
- Cathedral: St. Louis the King Cathedral, Haifa
- Patron saint: St. Louis the King
- Secular priests: 14

Current leadership
- Pope: Leo XIV
- Patriarch: Bechara Boutros al-Rahi
- Archeparch: Moussa El-Hage

The Archeparchy of Haifa and the Holy Land (in Latin: Archieparchia Ptolemaidensis Maronitarum in the Holy Land) is a branch of the Maronite Church immediately subject to the Patriarch of Antioch of the Maronites. Since 2012, it has been governed by Archbishop Moussa El-Hage, OAM.

== Territory and statistics ==
The archeparchy includes all the faithful of the Maronite Church residing in Israel. The archeparchial seat is the city of Haifa, where the Saint Louis the King Cathedral is located.

As of 2019, the Archeparchy had approximately 10,000 members, 14 priests, 8 parishes and 3 missions.

== History ==
There was an ancient Catholic diocese in Akka in the third century. The Maronite Archeparchy was established on 8 June 1996, with territory taken from the Maronite Catholic Archeparchy of Tyre. On 5 October of the same year, the archeparchy ceded part of its territory for the establishment of the patriarchal exarchates of Jerusalem and Palestine and Jordan, which have since joined in persona episcopi to all archeparchy.

== Affiliated bishops ==
- Paul Nabil El-Sayah (8 June 1996 – 6 June 2011, appointed Archbishop of the Patriarchal Curia of Antioch)
- Moussa El-Hage, OAM, (since 16 June 2012)

== See also ==
- Catholic Church in Israel
- List of Catholic dioceses (alphabetical)
- Christianity in Israel
- Maronites in Israel
