= Pontifical right =

Ecclesiastical institutions created or approved by the Holy See

In Catholicism, "of pontifical right" is the term given to ecclesiastical institutions (religious and secular institutes, societies of apostolic life) either created by the Holy See, or approved by it with the formal decree known by the Latin name decretum laudis ('decree of praise'). The term is included in the names of institutions, often capitalised in English: "Institute of [xxx] of Pontifical Right".

The institutions of pontifical right depend immediately and exclusively on the Holy See on matters of internal governance and discipline.

== History ==
Until the 19th century, religious communities were divided into two groups: regular orders with solemn vows and congregations of simple vows.

In 1215, in the Fourth Lateran Council, Pope Innocent III decreed that no regular orders could be founded without papal approval. The bishops, however, retained the right to form communities whose members lived the religious life without taking formal vows. These groups later took the name of "congregations of simple vows".

The number of congregations of simple vows, especially women's, was increasing dramatically during the 17th and 18th centuries. In the early 19th century, many were seeking papal recognition from Rome. In 1816, the Holy See began to approve the congregations with simple vows, but they were still not recognized as religious institutions.

In 1854, Giuseppe Andrea Bizzarri, the Secretary of the Sacred Congregation for Consultations About Regulars, created on behalf of Pope Pius IX a procedure for the approval of congregations of simple vows. This was communicated to the bishops in 1861.

With this new procedure, the distinction was formally made for the creation of an institute, operated by a bishop, and its approval by the Holy See. After its foundation, the institute (i.e., congregation) would have the status "of diocesan right". Under this status, the institute would remain under the protection of the bishops of the diocese where it was founded. If the Holy See grants the institute the decretum laudis (decree of approval), the institute would be placed under its direct protection. The institute would thus acquire the status "of pontifical right".

The distinction between the legal status of an institute of diocesan right and an institute of pontifical right was permanently drawn on 8 December 1900 by Conditae a Christo Ecclesiae (Latin for "Founded by the Church of Christ"), the apostolic constitution of Pope Leo XIII.

The Second Vatican Council's Dogmatic Constitution on the Church ruled that:

Any institute of perfection and its individual members may be removed from the jurisdiction of the local Ordinaries by the Supreme Pontiff and subjected to himself alone. This is done in virtue of his primacy over the entire Church in order to more fully provide for the necessities of the entire flock of the Lord and in consideration of the common good.

Canon 591 of the Code of Canon Law reflects this ruling:

In order to provide better for the good of institutes and the needs of the apostolate, the Supreme Pontiff, by reason of his primacy in the universal Church and with a view to common advantage, can exempt institutes of consecrated life from the governance of local ordinaries and subject them to himself alone or to another ecclesiastical authority.

== Bibliography ==
- Giuliano Nava, ed. (1988). Direttorio canonico per gli istituti religiosi, gli istituti secolari e le società di vita apostolica [Canonical Directory for Religious Institutes, Secular Institutes and Societies of Apostolic Life] (in Italian). Cinisello Balsamo, Italy: Edizioni paoline. ISBN 88-215-1618-0.
