= Antonins =

- Antonin Maronite Order
- Ordo Antonianorum Maronitarum
- Abbreviation: OAM
- Formation: 15 August 1700 (326 years ago)
- Founder: Gabriel of Blaouza
- Type: Monastic order of pontifical right for men
- Headquarters: Couvent St. Roch, Beirut, Lebanon
- Members: 176 members (153 priests) (2017)
- Superior General: Maroun Abou Jaoude, OAM
- Parent organization: Maronite Church
- Website: antonins.org

The Antonins, known formally as the Antonin Maronite Order (Latin: Ordo Antonianorum Maronitarum; abbreviated OAM), is a monastic order of pontifical right for men in the Maronite Church. The order was founded on 15 August 1700, in the Monastery of Mar Chaaya, Lebanon, by Maronite Patriarch Gabriel of Blaouza (1704-1705).

Its name comes from the Arabic Antouniyah (Arabic: الرهبنة الانطونية). They are also called Mar Chaaya monks (Arabic: رهبان مار شعيا), in reference to the monastery hosting the see of their superior general. It is one of the three Maronite congregations of monks alongside the Baladites and Aleppians.

== See also ==
- Mar Sarkis, Ehden
- Maronite Church

=== Maronite Religious Institutes (Orders) ===
- Baladites
- Aleppians
- Kreimists

=== Melkite Religious Institutes (Orders) ===
- Basilian Chouerite Order
- Basilian Salvatorian Order
- Basilian Alepian Order
