= Baladites =

Maronite religious order

- Lebanese Maronite Order
- Ordo Libanensis Maronitarum
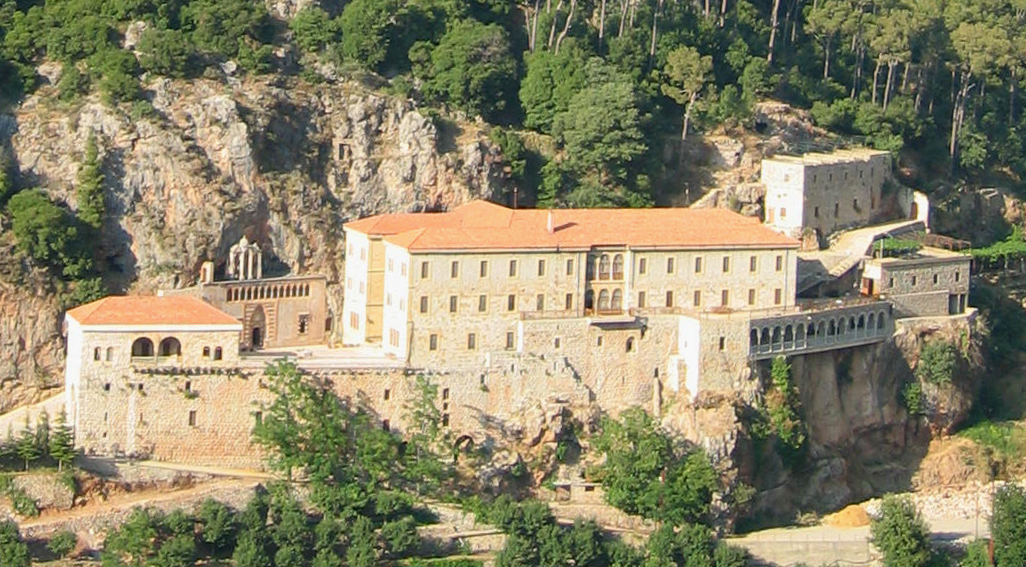
- Monastery of Qozhaya, Lebanon. Monastery of Qozhaya, Lebanon
- Abbreviation: OLM
- Formation: 10 November 1695 (330 years ago)
- Founder: Abdallah Qaraali, OLM
- Type: Monastic order of pontifical right (for men)
- Headquarters: Couvent Saint-Antoine, Ghazir, Jouneih, Lebanon
- Members: 383 (300 priests) (2017)
- Superior General (Abbot): Hadi Mahfouz, OLM
- Website: olm.org.lb

The Baladites, formally known as the Lebanese Maronite Order (Latin: Ordo Libanensis Maronitarum; abbreviated OLM), is a monastic order among the Levant-based, Catholic Maronite Church, which from the beginning has been specifically a monastic Church. The order was founded in 1694 in the Monastery of Mart Moura, Ehden, Lebanon, by three Maronite young men from Aleppo, Syria, under the patronage of Patriarch Estephan El Douaihy (1670–1704).

The Aleppian monks of Aleppo, a city in present Syria, resulted from a split with the Baladites. Pope Clement XIV sanctioned this separation in 1770.

== See also ==
- Monastery of Qozhaya
- Maronite Religious Institutes (Orders)
  - Antonins
  - Aleppians
  - Kreimists or Lebanese missionaries
- Melkite Religious Institutes (Orders)
  - Basilian Chouerite Order
  - Basilian Salvatorian Order
  - Basilian Alepian Order
