= Mariamite Maronite Order =

Catholic monastic order in Lebanon

- Latin: Ordo Maronita Beatae Mariae Virginis
- Abbreviation: OMM
- Nickname: Aleppians
- Formation: 10 November 1695 (330 years ago)
- Founded at: Ehden, Lebanon
- Type: Monastic order of pontifical right for men
- Headquarters: Couvent Notre Dame de Louaize, Lebanon
- Members: 112 members (95 priests) (2018)
- Superior General: Pierre Najem, OMM
- Parent organization: Maronite Catholic Church

The Mariamite Maronite Order (Latin: Ordo Maronita Beatae Mariae Virginis; abbreviated OMM), also called the Aleppians or Halabites, is a monastic order in the Levantine Catholic Maronite Church, which from the beginning has been specifically a monastic Church. The order was founded in 1694 in the Monastery of Mart Moura, Ehden, Lebanon, by three Maronite young men from Aleppo, Syria, under the patronage of Patriarch Estephan Douaihy (1670–1704).

Its name comes from the Arabic Halabiyyah (Arabic: الرهبنة الحلبية), city of Aleppo monks. It is one of the three Lebanese congregations that follow the tradition of Saint Anthony the Great. The name is in reference to the origin of the founders and first members of the order. On 9 April 1969, the order was named, in Latin, Ordo Maronita Beatae Mariae Virginis.

The second order is the Baladites (or Baladiyyah), country monks, the antonym of Halabiyyah. This order resulted from a split with the Aleppians. Pope Clement XIV sanctioned this separation in 1770.

The third Lebanese monastic order is the Antonin Maronite Order founded on August 15, 1700, by the Patriarch Gabriel of Blaouza (1704–1705).

== See also ==
- Monastery of Qozhaya

=== Maronite religious institutes ===
- Baladites
- Antonins
- Kreimists or Lebanese missionaries

=== Melkite religious institutes ===
- Basilian Chouerite Order
- Basilian Salvatorian Order
- Basilian Aleppian Order
