= Maronite Church =

Eastern Catholic church

Coordinates: 33.9678°N 35.6339°E

Antiochene Syriac Maronite Church
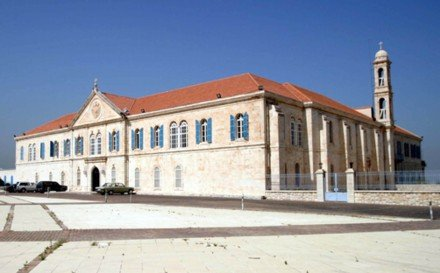
- Seat of the patriarchate in Bkerké, Lebanon
- Type: Particular church (sui iuris)
- Classification: Eastern Catholic
- Orientation: Eastern; Syriac
- Scripture: Peshitta
- Theology: Catholic theology
- Polity: Episcopal
- Governance: Holy Synod of the Maronite Church
- Pope: Leo XIV
- Patriarch: Bechara Boutros al-Rahi
- Region: Lebanon (approximately one third), Syria, Israel, Cyprus, Jordan, Palestine and diaspora
- Language: Arabic, Aramaic (Classical Syriac)
- Liturgy: West Syriac Rite
- Headquarters: Bkerké, Lebanon
- Founder: Maron; John Maron
- Origin: 410 AD; Monastery of Saint Maron, Phoenicia, Roman Empire
- Members: 3,498,707 (2017)

The Maronite Catholic Church (Arabic: الكنيسة المارونية; Syriac: ܥܕܬܐ ܣܘܪܝܝܬܐ ܡܪܘܢܝܬܐ) is an Eastern Catholic sui iuris particular church in full communion with the pope and the worldwide Catholic Church, with self-governance under the Code of Canons of the Eastern Churches. The head of the Maronite Church is Patriarch Bechara Boutros al-Rahi, who was elected in March 2011 following the resignation of Patriarch Nasrallah Boutros Sfeir. The seat of the Maronite Patriarchate is in Bkerké, northeast of Beirut, Lebanon. Officially known as the Antiochene Syriac Maronite Church (Arabic: الكنيسة الأنطاكية السريانية المارونية; Syriac: ܥܹܕܬܵܐ ܣܘܪܝܝܐ ܡܪܘܝܝܐ ܐܢܛܝܘܟܝܐ), it is part of Syriac Christianity by liturgy and tradition.

The early development of the Maronite Church can be divided into three periods, from the 4th to the 7th centuries. A congregation movement, with Saint Maron from the Taurus Mountains as an inspirational leader and patron saint, marked the first period. The second began with the establishment of the Monastery of Saint Maroun on the Orontes, built after the Council of Chalcedon to defend the doctrines of the council. This monastery was described as the "greatest monastery" in the region of Syria Secunda, with more than 300 hermitages around it, according to ancient records. After 518, the monastery de facto administered many parishes in Syria Prima, Coele-Syria, and Phoenicia. The third period was when sede vacante followed the Islamic conquest of the region and bishops of the Saint Maron Monastery elected John Maron as Patriarch circa 685 AD, according to Maronite tradition. The Greek Orthodox Church of Antioch reestablished their patriarchate in 751 AD. Other centers of historical importance include Kfarhay, Yanouh, Mayfouq, and the Qadisha Valley.

Although reduced in numbers today, the Maronites remain a principal group in Lebanon, with smaller minorities of Maronites in Syria, Cyprus, Israel, Palestine, and Jordan. Emigration since the 19th century means that about two-thirds of the Maronite Church's roughly 3.5 million members in 2017 were located outside "The Antiochian's Range", where they are part of the worldwide Lebanese diaspora.

== History ==
=== Origin ===
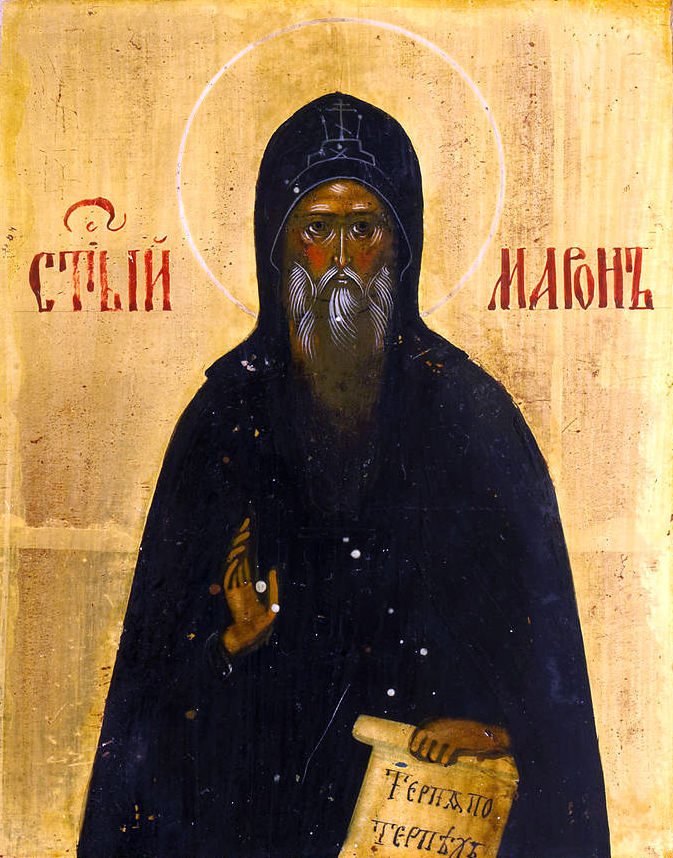
St. Maron: Russian orthodox icon

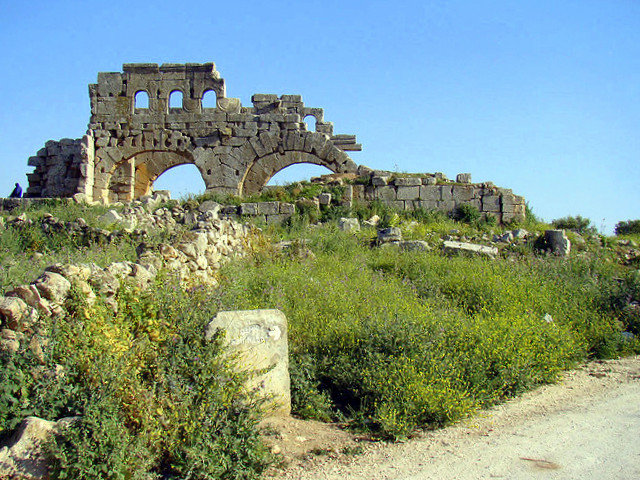
Remains of the arch of Brad Cathedral north of Aleppo, Syria, where Saint Maron's tomb was attached

Maron, a fourth-century monk and a contemporary and friend of John Chrysostom, left Antioch for the Orontes River in modern-day Syria to lead an ascetic life, following the traditions of Anthony the Great of the Desert and of Pachomius. Many of his followers also lived a monastic lifestyle. According to the tradition of the Maronite Church, Maron is considered the founder of the spiritual and monastic movement that evolved into what is now the Maronite Church. Maronite Christianity has had a profound influence on what is now Lebanon, and to a lesser degree Syria, Jordan and Palestine. Saint Maron spent his life on a mountain in Syria, generally believed to be "Kefar-Nabo" on the mountain of Ol-Yambos in the Taurus Mountains, contemporary Turkey, becoming the cradle of the Maronite movement established in the Monastery of Saint Maron.

Following Maron's death in 410 AD, his disciples built the Beth-Maron monastery at Apamea (present day Qalaat al-Madiq). This formed the nucleus of the Maronite Church. In 452, after the Council of Chalcedon, the monastery was expanded by the Byzantine emperor Marcian.

The Maronite movement reached Lebanon when St. Maron's first disciple, Abraham of Cyrrhus, who was called the "Apostle of Lebanon", set out to convert the non-Christians by introducing them to St. Maron.

The Maronites subscribed to the beliefs of the Council of Chalcedon in 451. Conflicts between Chalcedonian Maronites and Monophysites could become violent. A 517 letter from Chalcedonian Maronites to Pope Hormisdas said Monophysites killed 350 Maronite monks and burned the Monastery of Saint Simeon Stylites in an act of sectarian violence among Christians. Later, Justinian I restored the community. Correspondence concerning the event brought the Maronites papal and orthodox recognition, indicated by a letter from Pope Hormisdas (514–523) dated 10 February 518. Representatives from Beth-Maron participated in the Constantinople synods of 536 and 553.

An outbreak of civil war during the reign of Emperor Phocas brought forth riots in the cities of Syria and Palestine and incursions by Persian king Khosrow II. In 609, the patriarch of Antioch, Anastasius II, was killed either at the hands of some soldiers or locals. This left the Maronites without a leader, which continued because of the final Byzantine–Sassanid War of 602–628.

In the aftermath of the war, Emperor Heraclius propagated a new Christological doctrine in an attempt to unify the various Christian churches of the East, who were divided over accepting the Council of Chalcedon. This doctrine, called Monothelitism, held that Jesus Christ had two natures (one divine and one human) but only one will (not a divine will and also a human will), based on a phrasing of Pope Honorius I (see Controversy over Honorius I), and was meant as a compromise between supporters of Chalcedon, such as the Maronites, and opponents, such as the Jacobites. Monothelitism failed to settle the schism, however, and was declared a heresy at the Sixth Ecumenical Council in 680–681. The Council condemned both Honorius and Patriarch Sergius I of Constantinople but did not explicitly mention the Maronites.

Contemporary Greek and Arab sources suggest the Maronites rejected the Third Council of Constantinople and accepted monothelitism, only moving away from it in the time of the Crusades in order to avoid being branded heretics by the crusaders. The Maronite Church, however, rejects the assertions that the Maronites were ever monothelites and broke communion with Rome; and the question remains a matter of controversy. Elias El-Hāyek attributes much of the confusion to Eutyches of Alexandria, whose Annals El-Hāyek contain erroneous material regarding the early Maronite Church, which was then picked up by William of Tyre and others. Robert W. Crawford concluded the same, pointing out that the heretic "Maro" mentioned in the Annals, which William of Tyre considers as the namesake of the Maronites, was a Nestorian from Edessa and could not have been Maron or John Maron. However, Donald Attwater, a 20th-century historian of Eastern Christianity, affirmed the view that Maronites broke communion with Rome over monothelitism, however briefly.

=== First Maronite patriarch ===
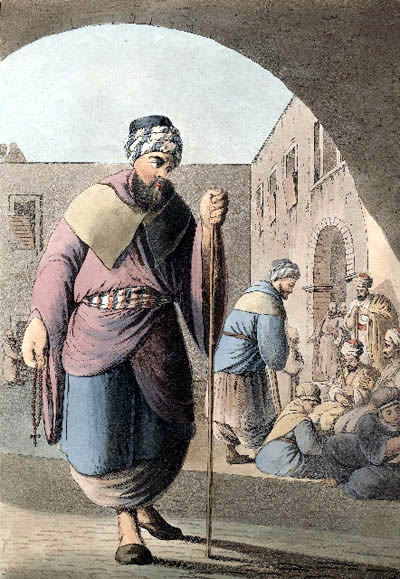
Artist depiction of Maronite monk and pilgrims, Mount Lebanon

The patriarch of Antioch Anastasius II died in 609, and Constantinople began to appoint a series of titular patriarchs, who resided in Constantinople. In 685, the Maronites elected Bishop John Maron of Batroun as Patriarch of Antioch and all the East.

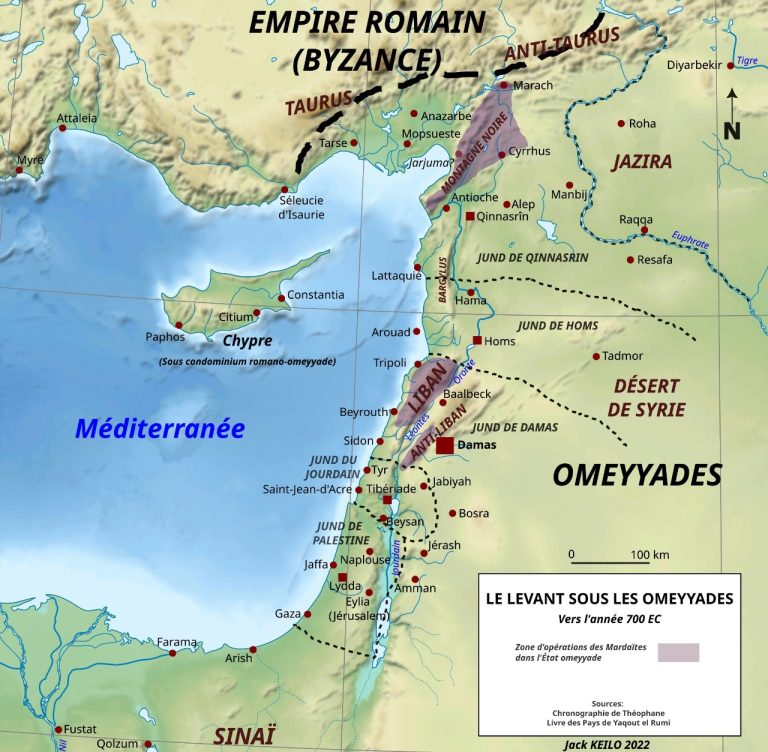
The Eastern Mediterranean under Umayyad rule, with the Mardaites zones showed in Mount Lebanon and the Amanus

In 687, as part of an agreements with Abd al-Malik ibn Marwan, Byzantine emperor Justinian II sent 12,000 Christian Maronites from Lebanon to Armenia, in exchange for a substantial payment and half the revenues of Cyprus. There they were conscripted as rowers and marines in the Byzantine navy. Additional resettlement efforts allowed Justinian to reinforce naval forces depleted by earlier conflicts.

John Maron established himself in the remote Qadisha Valley in Lebanon. In 694, Justinian sent troops against the Maronites in an unsuccessful attempt to capture the patriarch. John Maron died in 707 at the Monastery of St. Maron in Lebanon. Around 749 the Maronite community, in the Lebanon mountains, built the Mar-Mama church at Ehden. Meanwhile, caught between the Byzantines and the Arabs, the monastery at Beth-Maron struggled to survive.

=== Islamic rule ===
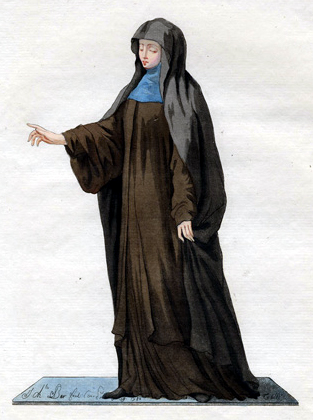
1779 painting of a Maronite nun from Mount Lebanon, with brown habit, blue headscarf and long black veil

After they came under Arab rule following the Muslim conquest of Syria (634–638), Maronite immigration to Lebanon, which had begun some time before, increased, intensifying under the Abbasid caliph al-Ma'mun (813–833).

To eliminate internal dissent, from 1289 to 1291 Egyptian Mamluk troops descended on Mount Lebanon, destroying forts and monasteries.

=== Crusades ===
Following the Muslim conquest of Eastern Christendom outside Anatolia and Europe in the 7th century and after the establishment of secured lines of demarcation between Islamic caliphs and Byzantine emperors, little was heard from the Maronites for 400 years. Secure in their mountain strongholds, the Maronites were contacted in the mountains near Tripoli, Lebanon, by Raymond of Toulouse on his way to conquer Jerusalem in the Great Crusade of 1096–1099. Raymond later returned to besiege Tripoli (1102–1109) after the conquest of Jerusalem in 1099, and relations between the Maronites and European Christianity were subsequently reestablished.

The Maronites assisted the crusaders and formally affirmed their affiliation with the Holy See of Rome in 1182. Contemporary chronicler William of Tyre described how in that year the Marionite Patriarch and bishops representing 40,000 people abjured their allegiance to the Ekthesis of Heraclius and made oaths of allegiance to the bishop of Rome, Pope Alexander III, while traditional Maronite accounts state that they were always loyal to the pope and that 1182 simply marked a formal confirmation of the union.

To commemorate their communion, Maronite patriarch Youseff Al Jirjisi received the crown and staff, marking his patriarchal authority, from Pope Paschal II in 1100 AD. In 1131, Maronite patriarch Gregorios Al-Halati received letters from Pope Innocent II in which the papacy recognized the authority of the Patriarchate of Antioch. Patriarch Jeremias II Al-Amshitti (1199–1230) became the first Maronite patriarch to visit Rome when he attended the Fourth Council of the Lateran in 1215. The Patriarchate of Antioch was also represented at the Council of Ferrara-Florence in 1438. Peter Hans Kolvenbach notes, "This contact with the Latin Church enriched the intellectual world of Europe in the Middle Ages. Maronites taught Oriental languages and literature at the universities of Italy and France."

During the Mamluk rule over Lebanon, the Maronites were persecuted, with many being killed and others emigrating to Cyprus. Maronite Patriarch Gabriel II of Hjoula was burned alive in 1367 by the Mamluks; and, after a Mamluk campaign against the patriarch residence in Ilig (close to Byblos), the patriarchal seat was moved to the Monastery of Our Lady of Qannubin, where it remained until the nineteenth century.

=== Ottoman rule ===
In the Ottoman Empire, indigenous concentrated religious communities dealt mainly with the provincial administration. Officially, Maronites had to pay the jizya tax as non-Muslims, but sometimes the monks and clergy were exempt because they were considered to be "poor".

Fakhr-al-Din II (1572–1635) was a Druze prince and a leader of the Emirate of Chouf District in the governorate of Mount Lebanon. Maronite Abū Nādir al-Khāzin was one of his foremost supporters and served as Fakhr-al-Din's adjutant. Phares notes that "The emirs prospered from the intellectual skills and trading talents of the Maronites, while the Christians gained political protection, autonomy and a local ally against the ever-present threat of direct Ottoman rule." In 1649, Patriarch Yuhanna al-Sufrari placed the Maronites under French protection, and the French opened a consulate in Beirut.

The Khāzin sheikhs subsequently increased in power and influence. In 1662, with the mediation of Jesuit missionaries, Abū Nawfal al-Khāzin was named French consul, despite complaints by Marseille merchants that he was not from Marseille, France. The church prospered from the protection and influence of the Khāzins, but at the expense of interference in church affairs, particularly ecclesiastical appointments, which the Khāzins saw as an extension of their political influence.

Bachir Chehab II was the first and last Maronite ruler of the Emirate of Mount Lebanon.

The relationship between the Druze and Christians has been characterized by harmony and peaceful coexistence, with amicable relations between the two groups prevailing throughout history, with the exception of some periods, including 1860 Mount Lebanon civil war.

The Maronite Catholics and the Druze founded modern Lebanon in the early eighteenth century, through a governing and social system known as the "Maronite–Druze dualism" in the Mount Lebanon Mutasarrifate.

==== Synod of Mount Lebanon (1736) ====
Archbishop of Beirut Tobia Aoun (1803–1871)

Due to closer ties with the Latin Church, the Maronite Church became one of the most Latinized of the Eastern Catholic Churches. Contacts between the Maronite monks and Rome were revived during the Crusades. The Maronites introduced to Eastern churches western devotional practices such as the rosary and the Stations of the Cross. Late in the 16th century, Pope Gregory XIII sent Jesuits to the Lebanese monasteries to ensure that their practice conformed to decisions made at the Council of Trent. The Maronite College in Rome was established by Gregory XIII in 1584. The Maronite missal (Qurbono) was first printed between 1592 and 1594 in Rome, although with fewer anaphoras.

Patriarch Stephan al-Duwayhî (1670–1704), (later beatified), was able to find a middle ground between reformers and conservatives, and re-vitalized Maronite liturgical tradition.

The Synod of Mount Lebanon (also Council of Luwayza) sought to incorporate both traditions and become a major turning point in the history of the Maronite Church. Maronite orientalist Joseph Simon Assemani presided as papal legate for Pope Clement XII. The synod drafted a Code of Canons for the Maronite Church and created the first regular diocesan structure. The Council of Luwayza led to a more effective church structure and to gradual emancipation from the influence of Maronite families. The council also formalized many of the Latin practices that had developed, but also attempted to preserve ancient Maronite liturgical tradition. Among the changes it decreed where the separation of baptism and confirmation, performing baptism by pouring water over the head instead of full immersion and the use of unleavened bread in the eucharistic service.

=== Independent Lebanon ===
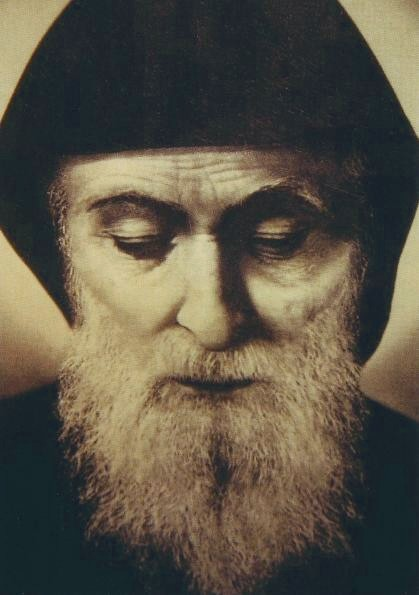
Depiction of Saint Charbel, a popular saint in Lebanon

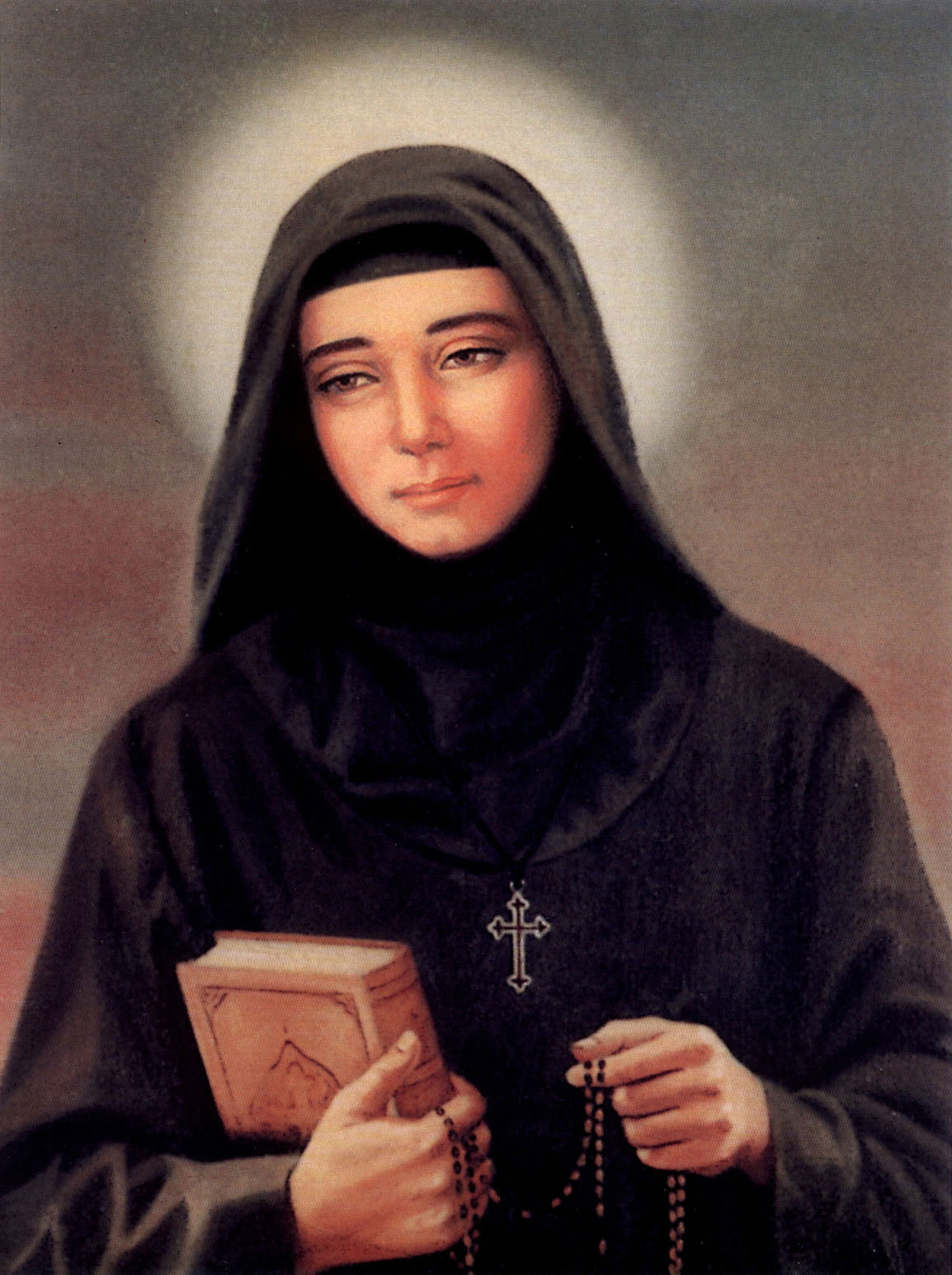
Depiction of Saint Rafqa, another popular saint in Lebanon

Following the first decades of independence after World War II, the Maronite patriarch Antun ‘Arıdah and his successor Bolos Meouchi placed a crucial role (among other things in establishing relations with the state of Israel), a role that increased due to the failure of the Lebanese state and its institutions in the second half of the 20th century.

Clerics of the Maronite Church, led by Archbishop Pietro Sfair, participated in the Second Vatican Council as Council Fathers and played an instrumental role in the drafting of Nostra aetate and promoting fraternal relations with both Judaism and Islam.

The Lebanese Civil War (1975–1990) consumed the Maronite Church with some 670,000 Christians being replaced as a result of the war.

In Orientale lumen, an Apostolic Letter to the churches of the East, issued 2 May 1995, Pope John Paul II quotes Orientalium Ecclesiarum, the Second Vatican Council's Decree on the Eastern Catholic Churches:

It has been stressed several times that the full union of the Catholic Eastern Churches with the Church of Rome which has already been achieved must not imply a diminished awareness of their own authenticity and originality. Wherever this occurred, the Second Vatican Council has urged them to rediscover their full identity, because they have "the right and the duty to govern themselves according to their own unique disciplines. For these are guaranteed by ancient tradition and seem to be better suited to the customs of their faithful and to the good of their souls."

Patriarch Sfeir's personal commitment accelerated liturgical reforms in the 1980s and 1990s. In 1992 he published a new Maronite Missal. This represents an attempt to return to the original form of the Antiochene liturgy, removing the liturgical Latinization of past centuries. There are six anaphoras.

Between 2003 and 2006, the largest Maronite synod since the Lebanese Council of 1736 took place. One of the most important outcomes was the decision to strengthen relations between local Lebanese institutions and the Maronite institutions and communities abroad. Patriarch Sfeir stated that Sacrosanctum concilium and the Roman liturgical changes following Vatican II apply to the Maronite Church. Sancrosanctum Concilium states that "Among these principles and norms there are some which can and should be applied both to the Roman rite and also to all the other rites. The practical norms which follow, however, should be taken as applying only to the Roman rite, except for those which, in the very nature of things, affect other rites as well." There has also been a revival of the eremitic tradition in the Maronite Church, which also resulted in a repopulation of the Qadisha valley by Maronites and other Christians.

== Organization ==
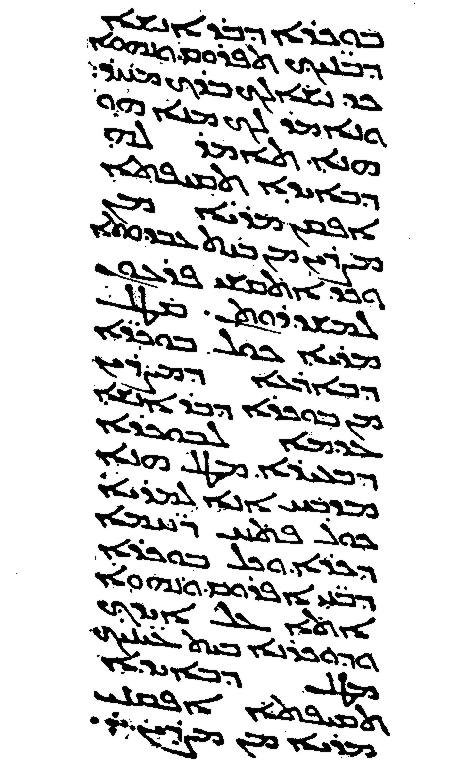
The Peshitta is the standard Syriac Bible, used by the Maronite Church, amongst others. The illustration is of the Peshitta text of Exodus 13:14–16 produced in Amida in the year 464.

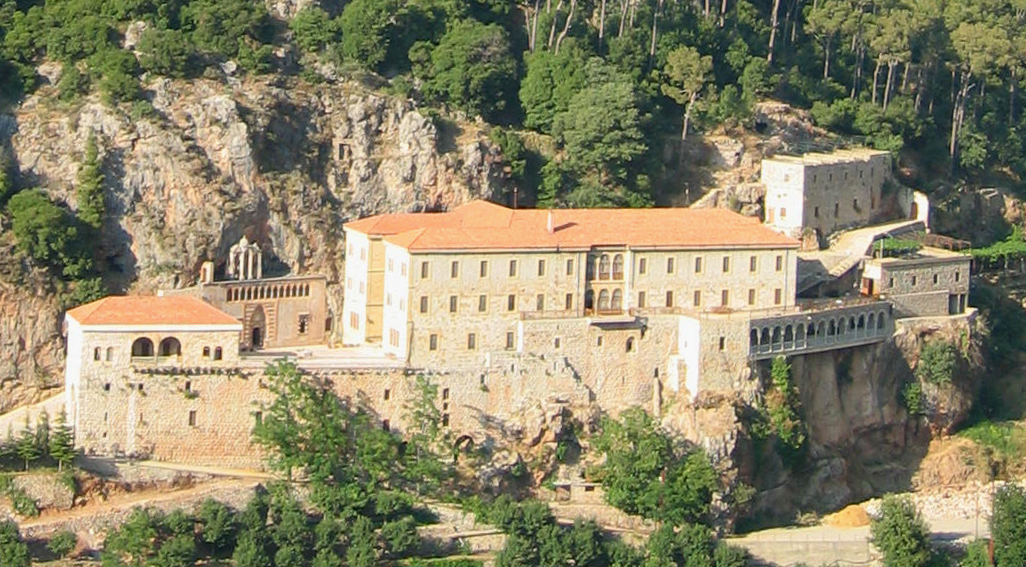
The Monastery of Saint Anthony of Qozhaya, in the Zgharta district, North Lebanon

=== Patriarchate of Antioch ===
The head of the Maronite Church is the Patriarch of Antioch and the Whole Levant, who is elected by the Maronite bishops and resides in Bkerké, close to Jounieh, north of Beirut. He resides in the northern town of Dimane during the summer.

There are four other claimants to the patriarchal succession of Antioch:

- two other Eastern Catholic, also in full communion with the Papal Holy See of Rome:
  - the Patriarch of Antioch and All the East, Alexandria and Jerusalem of the Melkite Greek Catholic Church (Byzantine Rite)
  - the Patriarch of Antioch and All the East of the Syriacs of the Syriac Catholic Church (West Syriac Rite)
- Eastern Orthodox Church: the Greek Orthodox Patriarch of Antioch and All the East, of the Greek Orthodox Patriarchate of Antioch, in communion with the Ecumenical Patriarch of Constantinople
- Oriental Orthodox Church: the Syriac Orthodox Patriarch of Antioch and All the East, Supreme Head of the Syriac Orthodox Church of Antioch

Clerical celibacy is not strictly required for Maronite deacons and priests of parishes outside of North America; monks, however, must remain celibate, as well as bishops who are normally selected from the monasteries. Around 50% of the Maronite diocesan priests in the Middle East are married. Due to a long-term understanding with their Latin counterparts in North America, Maronite priests in that area have traditionally remained celibate. However, in February 2014, former deacon Wissam Akiki was ordained to the priesthood by Bishop A. Elias Zaidan of the U.S. Maronite Eparchy of Our Lady of Lebanon at St. Raymond's Maronite Cathedral in St. Louis. Akiki is the first married man to be ordained to the Maronite priesthood in North America.

=== Episcopates ===
The Maronite church has twenty-eight eparchies and patriarchal vicariates. These are:

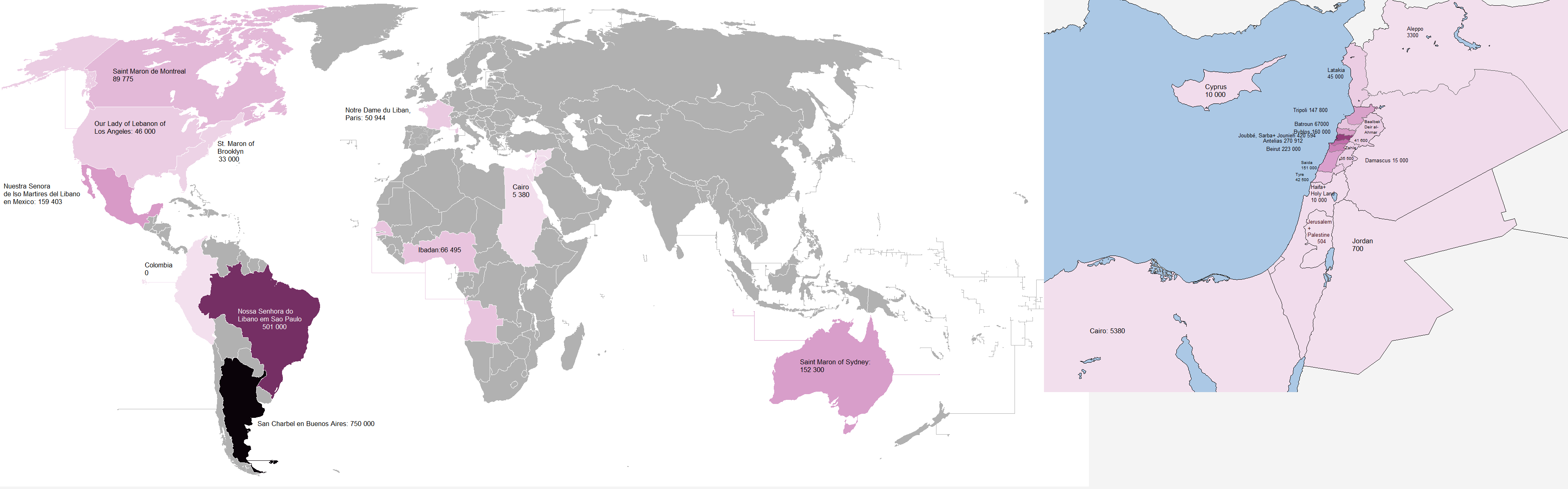
A map depicting the dioceses of the Maronite Church by number of faithful

==== Middle East ====
- Maronite Catholic Patriarchate of Antioch see above

Worldwide, immediately subject to the patriarch

- In Lebanon:
  - Maronite Catholic Archeparchy of Antelias
  - Maronite Catholic Eparchy of Baalbek-Deir El Ahmar
  - Maronite Catholic Eparchy of Batroun
  - Maronite Catholic Archeparchy of Beirut
  - Maronite Catholic Eparchy of Jbeil
  - Maronite Catholic Eparchy of Joubbé, Sarba and Jounieh (sole Suffragan of the Patriarch of Antioch)
  - Maronite Catholic Eparchy of Sidon
  - Maronite Catholic Archeparchy of Tripoli
  - Maronite Catholic Archeparchy of Tyre
  - Maronite Catholic Eparchy of Zahleh
- In the Holy Land:
  - Maronite Catholic Archeparchy of Haifa and the Holy Land, in Israel whose Archeparch holds the offices of Patriarchal Vicar of:
    - Patriarchal Exarch of the Maronite Catholic Patriarchal Exarchate of Jerusalem and Palestine in the Palestinian Territories and
    - Maronite Catholic Patriarchal Exarchate of Jordan in (Trans)Jordan
- In Syria:
  - Maronite Catholic Archeparchy of Damascus
  - Maronite Catholic Archeparchy of Aleppo
  - Maronite Catholic Eparchy of Latakia
- In Cyprus: Maronite Catholic Archeparchy of Cyprus in Nicosia
- In Egypt: Maronite Catholic Eparchy of Cairo

==== Elsewhere ====
Exempt, i.e. immediately subject to the Holy See:

  - In Africa: Maronite Catholic Eparchy of Annunciation of Ibadan, with cathedral see being Church of Our Lady of the Annunciation, in Ibadan, in Nigeria
  - In South America: Maronite Catholic Apostolic Exarchate of Colombia, with pro-cathedral see being Church of Our Lady of Lebanon, in Bogotá, in Colombia

Subject to the synod in matters of liturgical and particular law, otherwise exempt, i.e. immediately subject to the Holy See and its Dicastery for the Eastern Churches:

- In Europe:
  - Maronite Catholic Eparchy of Our Lady of Lebanon of Paris in France
- In North and Central America:
  - Maronite Catholic Eparchy of Saint Maron of Montreal, in Canada
  - Maronite Catholic Eparchy of Our Lady of Lebanon of Los Angeles in the United States (Central US, US West Coast)
  - Maronite Catholic Eparchy of Saint Maron of Brooklyn in the United States (US East Coast)
  - Maronite Catholic Eparchy of Our Lady of the Martyrs of Lebanon in Mexico in Mexico
- In Oceania:
  - Maronite Catholic Eparchy of Saint Maron of Sydney, in Australia

Suffragan eparchies in the ecclesiastical provinces of Latin metropolitan archbishops; both in South America:

- Maronite Catholic Eparchy of San Charbel in Buenos Aires in Argentina, suffragan of the Archdiocese of Buenos Aires
- Maronite Catholic Eparchy of Our Lady of Lebanon of São Paulo in Brazil, suffragan of the Archdiocese of São Paulo

=== Titular sees ===
- Four titular archbishoprics (none metropolitan): Cyrrhus of the Maronites, Laodicea in Syria of the Maronites, Nazareth of the Maronites, Nisibis of the Maronites
- Nine titular bishoprics: Apamea in Syria of the Maronites, Arca in Armenia of the Maronites, Arca in Phoenicia of the Maronites, Callinicum of the Maronites, Epiphania in Syria of the Maronites, Hemesa of the Maronites, Ptolemais in Phœnicia of the Maronites, Sarepta of the Maronites, Tarsus of the Maronites.

=== Religious institutes (orders) ===
- Lebanese Maronite Order
- Antonin Maronite Order
- Mariamite Maronite Order
- Congregation of Maronite Lebanese Missionaries

== Population ==
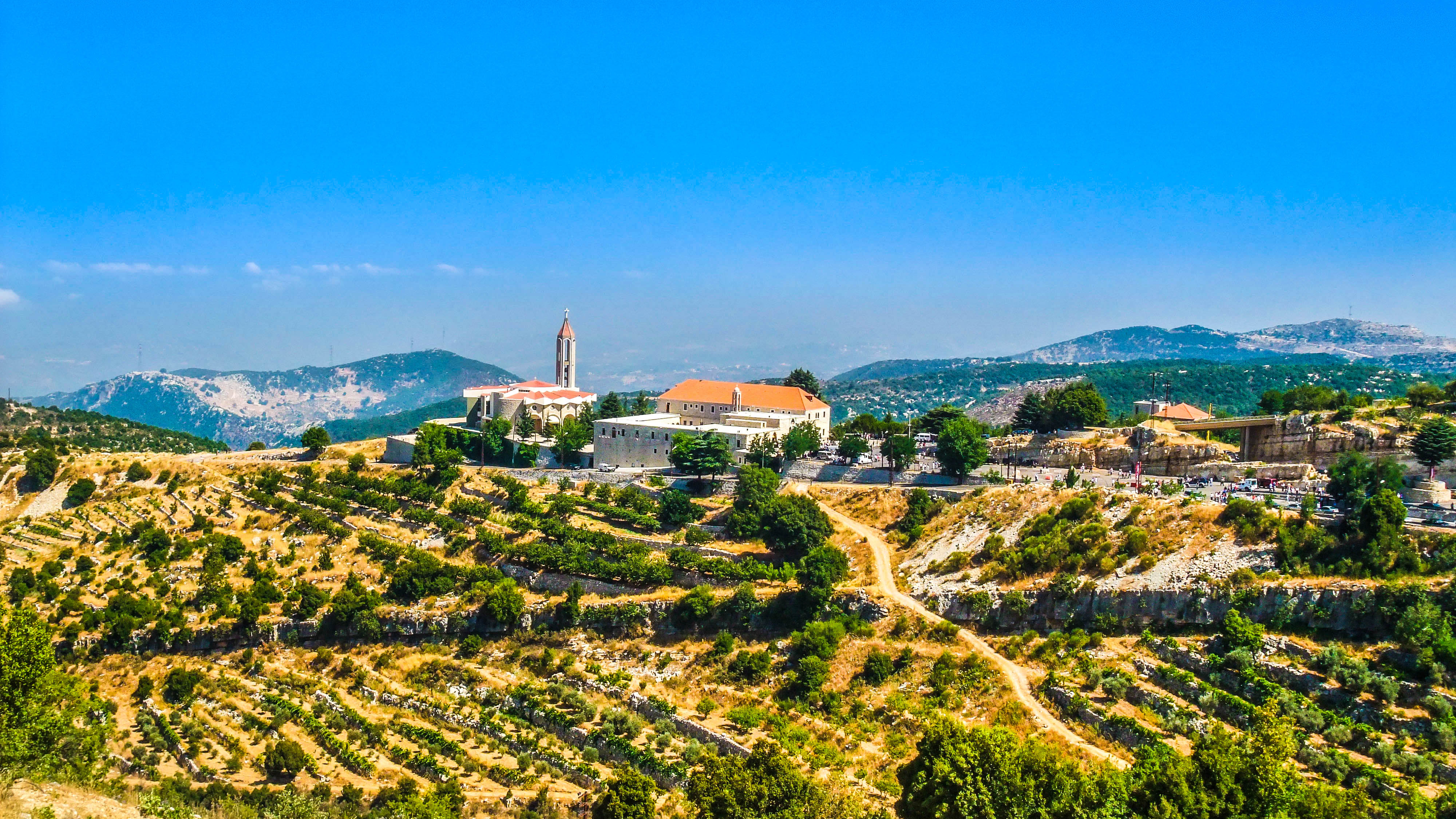
The Sanctuary of Saint Charbel and Maronite monastery in Annaya, Lebanon

In the 12th century, about 40,000 Maronites resided in the area around Antioch and modern-day Lebanon. By the 21st century, estimates suggest that the Maronite diaspora population may have grown to more than twice the estimated 2 million Maronites living in their historic homelands in Lebanon, Syria, and Israel.

According to the official site of the Maronite church, approximately 1,062,000 Maronites live in Lebanon, where they constitute up to 22–23 percent of the population. Syrian Maronites total 51,000, following the archdioceses of Aleppo and Damascus and the Diocese of Latakia. A Maronite community of about 10,000 lives in Cyprus with approximately 1,000 speakers of Cypriot Maronite Arabic from Kormakitis. A noticeable Maronite community exists in northern Israel (Galilee), numbering 7,504.

=== Diaspora ===
Maronite Pastoral Center in St. Louis, Missouri, U.S.

Immigration of Maronite faithful from the Middle East to the United States began during the latter part of the nineteenth century. When the faithful were able to obtain a priest, communities were established as parishes under the jurisdiction of the local Latin bishops. In January 1966, Pope Paul VI established the Maronite Apostolic Exarchate for the Maronite faithful of the United States. In a decree of the Sacred Congregation for the Eastern Churches, Bishop Francis Mansour Zayek was appointed the first exarch. The see, in Detroit, Michigan, with a cathedral under the patronage of Saint Maron, was suffragan to the Archdiocese of Detroit. In 1971, Pope Paul VI elevated the Exarchate to the status of an Eparchy, with the name of Eparchy of Saint Maron of Detroit. In 1977, the see of the Eparchy of Saint Maron was transferred to Brooklyn, New York, with the cathedral under the patronage of Our Lady of Lebanon. The name of the Eparchy was modified to Eparchy of Saint Maron of Brooklyn.

In 1994, the Eparchy of Our Lady of Lebanon was established with the cathedral at Los Angeles, California, under the patronage of Our Lady of Lebanon. John George Chedid, auxiliary bishop of the Diocese of Saint Maron of Brooklyn, was ordained as the first Bishop of the Maronite Catholic Eparchy of Our Lady of Lebanon of Los Angeles at the Our Lady of Lebanon Cathedral in Los Angeles, California, where he served until he reached the mandatory retirement age of 80. In December 2000, Robert Joseph Shaheen succeeded Chedid as eparch.

Eparchies operate in São Paulo in Brazil, as well as in Colombia, Mexico, France, Australia, South Africa, Canada and Argentina.

Former Brazilian president Michel Temer, the first Lebanese Brazilian to have led the nation, was the son of two Maronite Catholic Lebanese immigrants.

== Other ==
- The Maronite Church awards medals, Great Crosses, and the Golden Order of the Maronite General Council of the Maronite Church.

== See also ==
- Charbel Makhlouf
- Nimatullah Kassab
- Cross of All Nations
- Kitab al-Huda
- Our Lady of Lebanon
- Phoenicianism
- Saint George in devotions, traditions and prayers
- St Thomas Christians

== Bibliography ==
- Moosa, Matti (1986). The Maronites in History. Syracuse, New York: Syracuse University Press. ISBN 9781593331825.
- Moosa, Matti (2005). The Maronites in History. New York: Gorgias Press. ISBN 1-59333-182-7.
- Mourkazel, Joseph (15 December 2020). "Maronite Christians". In Raheb, Mitri; Lamport, Mark A. (eds.). The Rowman & Littlefield Handbook of Christianity in the Middle East. Rowman & Littlefield. ISBN 978-1-5381-2418-5.
- No'man, Paul (1996). The Yesterday of the Maronite Church and it's Tomorrow (in Arabic). Ghosta: Books.
- O’Mahony, Anthony (2008). "Syriac Christianity in the modern Middle East". In Angold, Michael (ed.). The Cambridge History of Christianity – Volume 5: Eastern Christianity. Cambridge University Press. ISBN 978-0-521-81113-2.
