= Joseph Mouawad =

Lebanese Catholic priest (born 1970)

- Eparch of Zahleh
- Native name: چوزيف معوض
- Church: Maronite Church
- Diocese: Eparchy of Zahleh
- Appointed: 14 March 2015
- Predecessor: Mansour Hobeika
- Previous posts: Titular Eparch of Ptolemais in Phoenicia (2012-2015); Curial Bishop of Antioch (2012-2015)

Orders
- Ordination: 13 August 1995
- Consecration: 28 July 2012 by Bechara Boutros al-Rahi

Personal details
- Born: 26 March 1970 (age 56) Mayfouq, Mount Lebanon Governorate, Lebanon

Joseph Mouawad (born 26 March 1970 in Mayfouq, Lebanon) is the current eparch of the Maronite Catholic Eparchy of Zahleh in Lebanon.

== Life ==
Joseph Mouawad received his priestly ordination on 13 August 1995.

Pope Benedict XVI confirmed his appointment as Curial Bishop of Antioch and appointed him on 16 June 2012 Titular bishop of Ptolemais in Phoenicia dei Maroniti. Maronite Patriarch of Antioch, Cardinal Bechara Boutros al-Rahi, OMM ordained him on 28 July of the same year to the episcopate. His co-consecrators were Samir Mazloum, retired Curial Bishop of Antioch, Guy-Paul Noujaim, emeritus Curial Bishop in Joubbé, Sarba and Jounieh, Paul Youssef Matar, Archeparch of Beirut, Francis Némé Baïssari, Emeritus Auxiliary Bishop in Joubbé, Sarba and Jounieh, Paul Nabil El-Sayah, Curial Bishop of Antioch, Joseph Mohsen Béchara, Archbishop Emeritus of Antelias, Simon Atallah, OAM, Eparch of Baalbek-Deir El-Ahmar, François Eid, OMM, procurator of the Maronite Patriarch at the Holy See, Edgard Madi, Eparch of Nossa Senhora do Líbano em São Paulo, and Michel Aoun, Eparch of Byblos.

Mouawad was named Eparch of Zahleh on 14 March 2015.
