= Paul-Emile Saadé =

Lebanese bishop (1933–2022)

His Excellency Paul-Emile Saadé
- Eparch of Batroun
- Appointed: 5 June 1999
- Term ended: 5 June 2011
- Predecessor: Youhanna Habqoug Albecha'alani
- Successor: Mounir Khairallah
- Previous posts: Titular Bishop of Antiochia and Apamea in Syria (1986–1999)

Orders
- Ordination: 12 April 1958
- Consecration: 12 July 1986 by Nasrallah Boutros Sfeir

Personal details
- Born: 9 July 1933 Ehden, Lebanon
- Died: 21 September 2022 (aged 89) Zgharta, Lebanon

Paul-Emile Saadé (9 July 1933 – 21 September 2022) was a Lebanese Maronite Catholic prelate who was Emeritus Maronite Eparch of the Maronite Catholic Eparchy of Batroun.

== Life ==
Paul-Emile Saadé was born in Ehden, Mount Lebanon on 9 July 1933.

Saadé received his priestly ordination on 12 April 1958. On 2 May 1986, Pope John Paul II appointed him titular bishop of Apamea in Syria dei Maroniti and auxiliary bishop of Antioch. Maronite Patriarch of Antioch, Nasrallah Boutros Sfeir ordained him bishop on 12 July of the same year. His co-consecrators were Roland Aboujaoudé, Auxiliary bishop of Antioch, Georges Abi-Saber, Auxiliary bishop of Antioch, Chucrallah Harb, Eparch of Jounieh, Joseph Mohsen Béchara, Archeparch of Cyprus, Khalil Abi-Nader, Archeparch of Beirut, Ignace Ziadé, Emeritus Archeparch of Beirut, Antoine Joubeir, Archeparch of Tripoli, Elie Farah, Emeritus Archeparch of Cyprus, Joseph Merhi, Eparch of Cairo and Ibrahim Hélou, Eparch of Sidon.

On 5 June 1999, Saadé was appointed bishop of the Maronite Eparchy of Batroun. On 5 June 2011, his resignation by reason of age was accepted by Pope Benedict XVI.

Saadé died on 21 September 2022, at the age of 89.

Catholic Church titles
Preceded by Youhanna Habqoug Albecha'alani	Eparch of Batroun; 1999–2011	Succeeded by Mounir Khairallah
Preceded by Antoine Joubeir	Titular Bishop of Apamea in Syria; 1986–1999	Succeeded by Youhanna Rafic Warcha
Preceded by —	Auxiliary Bishop of Antiochia; 1986–1999	Succeeded by —
