= Paul Rouhana =

Paul Rouhana, OLM (born 13 November 1954, in Amsheet, Lebanon) is Auxiliary bishop of the Maronite Catholic Eparchy of Joubbé, Sarba and Jounieh to Sarba.

== Life ==
Paul Rouhana entered the OLM in 1971, making his religious vows on 17 January 1978, and receiving on 27 June 1982, the sacrament of ordination.

On 16 June 2012 Pope Benedict XVI appointed him titular bishop of Antarados and chose him to be Auxiliary bishop to Sarba. Maronite Patriarch of Antioch, Cardinal Bechara Boutros al-Rahi, OMM, ordained him on 28 July of the same year to the episcopate. His co-consecrators were Emeritus Curia Bishop of Antioch, Samir Mazloum, Paul Youssef Matar, Archeparch of Beirut, the Curia Bishop of Antioch, Paul Nabil El-Sayah, Archbishop Emeritus of Archeparchy Antelias, Joseph Mohsen Béchara, the bishop of the Eparchy of Baalbek-Deir El-Ahmar, Simon Atallah, OAM, the Bishop Emeritus of Cairo, François Eid, OMM, Bishop of the Eparchy of Nossa Senhora do Líbano em São Paulo, Edgard Madi, Eparchy of Byblos, Michel Aoun, and the Auxiliary Bishops emeritus in Joubbé, Sarba and Jounieh, Guy-Paul Noujaim and Francis Némé Baïssari.
