= Georges Bou-Jaoudé =

Lebanese archbishop (1943–2022)

His Excellency, The Most Reverend Georges Bou-Jaoudé His Excellency
- Archbishop of Tripoli
- Diocese: Tripoli
- Appointed: 28 December 2005
- Term ended: 1 November 2020
- Predecessor: Youhanna Fouad El-Hage
- Successor: Youssef Antoine Soueif

Orders
- Ordination: 9 February 1968
- Consecration: 11 February 2006 by Nasrallah Boutros Sfeir

Personal details
- Born: 27 December 1943 Jouret El-Ballout, Lebanon
- Died: 28 March 2022 (aged 78) Bhannes, Lebanon

Georges Bou-Jaoudé, CM (27 December 1943 – 28 March 2022) was a Maronite Catholic hierarch, who served as archbishop of the Maronite Catholic Archeparchy of Tripoli in Lebanon.

== Life ==
Georges Bou-Jaoudé was born in 1943 in Jouret El-Ballout, Lebanon, and on 25 December 1966 made his religious vows as a friar of the CM and was ordained priest on 9 February 1968. The Synod of Maronite Bishops elected him on 24 September 2005 Archeparch of Tripoli in Lebanon. This choice was confirmed by the Holy See on 28 December 2005. Maronite Patriarch of Antioch, Cardinal Nasrallah Boutros Sfeir, ordained him bishop and his co-consecrators were Bishop Roland Aboujaoudé, auxiliary bishop of Antioch and Tanios El Khoury, Emeritus Eparch of Sidon, on 11 February 2006. As Archeparch of Tripoli of Libano he was, in October 2010, a delegate at the Special Assembly of the Synod of the Middle East. As co-consecrator he assisted in the episcopal ordination of Joseph Soueif, Archeparch of Cyprus and Hanna Alwan, MLM, Titular bishop of Sarepta dei Maroniti and Curia Bishop of Antioch.
