= Antoine Chbeir =

Lebanese Maronite bishop of Latakia

- Eparch of Latakia
- Native name: انطوان شبير
- Church: Maronite Church
- Diocese: Eparchy of Latakia
- Appointed: 14 March 2015
- Predecessor: Elias Khoury Sleman

Orders
- Ordination: 13 June 1988
- Consecration: 18 April 2015 by Bechara Boutros al-Rahi

Personal details
- Born: 12 January 1961 (age 65) Ghosta, Mount Lebanon Governorate, Lebanon

Antoine Chbeir (born 12 January 1961) is a Lebanese Maronite bishop of the Maronite Catholic Eparchy of Latakia.

== Life ==
Antoine Chbeir was born in 1961 in Ghosta, Mount Lebanon Governorate, Lebanon. He was ordained on13 June 1988. The decision of the 14th Synod of Bishops of the Maronite Church on 10 March 2015 convenes to elected him Bishop of Latakia. Pope Francis approved his election as Bishop of Latakia on 14 March 2015.

On 18 April 2015 Chbeir was ordained bishop by the hands of Maronite Patriarch of Antioch, Béchara Boutros Raï, OMM. His co-consecrators were Antoine Nabil Andari, Titular bishop of Tarsus of Maronites and Joseph Soueif, bishop of Cyprus.

== Sources ==
- Dalle Chiese Orientali Cattoliche, Daily Bulletin, Holy See Press Office, 14 March 2015, Retrieved 14 March 2015 (in Italian).
