= Antoine Torbey =

Maronite bishop

Antoine Torbey (15 September 1925 – 9 August 2004) was a Maronite bishop of the Maronite Catholic Eparchy of Latakia.

== Life ==
Antoine Torbey received on 24 March 1951 his priestly ordination. Pope John Paul II appointed him on May 2, 1986 Bishop of Latakia and his episcopal ordination was performed by the Maronite Patriarch of Antioch, Nasrallah Boutros Sfeir, on 12 July of the same year. His co-consecrators were Georges Abi-Saber, OLM, Auxiliary bishop of Antioch, Chucrallah Harb, Bishop of Jounieh, Joseph Mohsen Béchara, Archbishop of Cyprus, Khalil Abi-Nader, Archbishop of Beirut, Ignace Ziadé, Archbishop Emeritus of Beirut, Antoine Joubeir, Archbishop of Tripoli del Libano, Elie Farah, emeritus Archbishop of Cyprus, Joseph Merhi, CML, Bishop of Cairo, Ibrahim Hélou, Archbishop ad personam of Sidon, and Roland Aboujaoudé, auxiliary bishop in Antioch.

On June 23, 2001, Pope John Paul II accepted his age-related resignation. Torbey died on 9 August 2004 at the age of 78.
