= Hanna Alwan =

Lebanese bishop

Hanna Alwan, MLM (born on 20 September 1954 in Aytou, Lebanon) is Curial bishop of the Maronite Catholic Patriarchate of Antioch.

== Life ==
Hanna Alwan joined the MLM and made his religious vows in 1979. On 18 July 1981 Alwan received his priestly ordination.

On March 4, 1996, Pope John Paul II appointed him as a prelate auditor of the Tribunal of the Roman Rota.

The Synod of the Maronite Church elected him on 6 June 2011 Curial Bishop of Antioch. Pope Benedict XVI confirmed his appointment and named him on 13 August 2011 titular bishop of Sarepta dei Maroniti.

Maronite Patriarch of Antioch, Cardinal Bechara Boutros al-Rahi, OMM, ordained him on 16 September of the same year to the episcopate. His co-consecrators were Joseph Hitti, Eparch of Saint Maron of Sydney, and Georges Bou-Jaoudé, CM, Archeparch of Tripoli.
