= Emile Eid =

Personal details
- Born: 15 March 1925 Mazraat el Daher, Lebanon
- Died: 30 November 2009 (aged 84)

Sainthood
- Title as Saint: Bishop

Emile Eid (March 15, 1925, in Mazraat el Daher, Lebanon – November 30, 2009) was the Maronite Catholic titular bishop of Sarepta dei Maroniti.

== Life ==
Ordained to the priesthood on May 6, 1951, to the Maronite Catholic Eparchy of Sidon, Eid was named titular bishop on December 20, 1982, and was ordained bishop of Sarepta dei Maroniti on January 23, 1983, by Maronite Patriarch of Antioch, Anthony Peter Khoraish, and his co-consecrators were Nasrallah Boutros Sfeir, Titular bishop of Tarsus dei Maroniti and Ibrahim Hélou, Eparch of Sidon. Bishop Eid served as vice president of the commission that wrote the Code of Canons of the Eastern Churches. On October 18, 1990, Eid resigned his duties as bishop due to age-related reasons.

Emile Eid died on November 30, 2009, at the age of 84.
