= Elias Khoury Sleman =

- Eparch Emeritus of Latakia
- Native name: إلياس خوري سليمان
- Church: Maronite Church
- Diocese: Eparchy of Latakia
- In office: 16 January 2012 – 14 March 2015
- Predecessor: Youssef Massoud Massoud
- Successor: Antoine Chbeir

Orders
- Ordination: 29 August 1987
- Consecration: 25 February 2012 by Bechara Boutros al-Rahi

Personal details
- Born: 16 August 1951 (age 75) Hekr Semaan, Syrian Republic

Elias Khoury Slaiman Slaiman (born 16 August 1951 in Hekr Semaan, Syria) is a Syrian emeritus bishop of the Maronite Catholic Eparchy of Latakia.

== Life ==
Elias Khoury Slaiman received on 29 August 1987 his priestly ordination. Pope John Paul II appointed him on 16 January 2012 bishop of Latakia.

His episcopal ordination was performed by the hands of the Maronite Patriarch of Antioch, Bechara Boutros al-Rahi, OMM, on 25 February 2012; his co-consecrators were Youssef Anis Abi-Aad, IdP, Archeparch of Aleppo, and Antoine Nabil Andari, Curial Bishop in Antioch. Slaiman was introduced in the office on 26 February of the same year.

On 14 March 2015 Elias Slaiman resigned his office as Maronite Eparch of Latakia.
