= Georges Scandar =

Lebanese bishop (1927–2018)

- Eparch of Zahleh
- Native name: جورج اسكندر
- Church: Maronite Church
- Diocese: Eparchy of Zahleh
- In office: 9 June 1990 – 12 September 2002
- Predecessor: Eparchy erected
- Successor: Mansour Hobeika
- Previous post: Eparch of Baalbek and Zahle (1977-1990)

Orders
- Ordination: 13 June 1965
- Consecration: 12 November 1977 by Anthony Peter Khoraish

Personal details
- Born: 12 May 1927 Zahlé, mandatory Lebanese Republic, French Empire
- Died: 15 May 2018 (aged 91)

Georges Scandar (12 May 1927 in Zahleh – 15 May 2018) was the first eparch of the Maronite Catholic Eparchy of Zahleh and a former eparch of the Maronite Catholic Eparchy of Baalbek and Zahleh.

== Biography ==
Georges Skandar was born in the predominantly Christian-Arab city Zahle. His ordination to the priesthood was on 13 June 1965 in the Maronite Catholic Eparchy of Baalbek.

On 4 August 1977, Georges Skandar was appointed eparch of Baalbek and Zahle. His solemn episcopal consecration took place on 12 November 1977 by the hands of the Maronite Patriarch of Antioch, Cardinal Anthony Peter Khoraish and his co-consecrators were Joseph Salamé, Archeparch of Aleppo and Ibrahim Hélou, Eparch of Sidon. On 9 June 1990, Skander was again, at the age of 63 years, the first bishop of the Maronite Catholic Eparchy of Zahleh. He headed the newly established Eparchy for twelve years, until his retirement on 12 September 2002, at the age of 75 years.
