= Khalil Abi-Nader =

Lebanese Catholic bishop

- Archeparch of Beirut
- Native name: خليل ابى نادر
- Church: Maronite Church
- Archdiocese: Archeparchy of Beirut
- In office: 4 April 1986 – 8 June 1996
- Predecessor: Ignatius Ziade
- Successor: Paul Youssef Matar

Orders
- Ordination: 29 June 1947
- Consecration: 18 May 1986 by Nasrallah Boutros Sfeir

Personal details
- Born: 6 December 1921 Mtein (north of Mchikha), State of Greater Lebanon, French Empire
- Died: 14 June 2009 (aged 87)

Khalil Abi-Nader (born 6 December 1921, in Mtein, Lebanon – died on 14 June 2009) was an Archeparch of the Maronite Catholic Archeparchy of Beirut.

== Biography ==
=== Life ===
Khalil Abi Nader came from the well-known Lebanese family Abi Nader and was born in the Mount Lebanon Governorate in Matn District on 6 December 1921.

Ordained to the priesthood in the Archeparchy of Beirut on 29 June 1947, he was a teacher at the school La Sagesse in Beirut, later its director in Beirut and Jdeidé.

On 4 April 1986, Abi-Nader was elected archbishop of the Archeparchy. His solemn consecration took place on 18 May 1986 by the hands of the Maronite Patriarch of Antioch Nasrallah Boutros Sfeir. His co-consecrators were the bishops Chucrallah Harb, Eparch of Joubbé, Sarba and Jounieh and Roland Aboujaoudé, Auxiliary Bishop of Antioch. Archeparch Abi-Nader acted as co-consecrator in the episcopal ordinations of Abdallah Bared, Antoine Torbey, Paul-Emile Saadé and Béchara Raï.

Abi-Nader retired from his office on 8 June 1996, and died on 14 June 2009.

=== Political influence in the Lebanese society ===
Abi-Nader was repeatedly abducted, but was released on intervention of various politicians repeatedly. Together with the Imam Musa al-Sadr, he was committed to an understanding of both religions in Lebanon. During the military clashes between the Lebanese Forces (LF) and the regular Lebanese army, he campaigned with his life for fire breaks. He was also one of the principal representatives of the Lebanese Society for preservation of Francophonie in Lebanon.
