= Antoine Joubeir =

Antoine Joubeir (18 August 1918 in Salvador Brazil – 4 June 1994 in Lebanon) was an Archeparch of the Maronite Catholic Archeparchy of Tripoli in Lebanon.

== Life ==
Antoine Joubeir was consecrated priest on November 8, 1942. On 12 July 1975 he was appointed by Pope Paul VI auxiliary bishop of Tripoli and Titular Archbishop of Apamea in Syria dei Maroniti. Maronite Patriarch of Antioch, Anthony Peter Khoraish, consecrated him bishop on August 23, 1975, supported by the co-consecrators Elie Farah, Archeparch of Cyprus and Bishop Joseph Merhi, MLM, Eparch of Cairo. After the death of his predecessor Antoine Abed the Archeparchy of Tripoli became vacant. Joubeir was from 1975 to 1977 Apostolic administrator of Tripoli and received the title of Archbishop "ad personam". Since 4 August 1977 he was Archeparch of Tripoli and became on 2 July 1993 according to age Emeritus Archbishop. In 1987 he ordained future Archbishop Joseph Soueif of Cyprus to the priesthood. He was co-consecrator of Abdallah Bared, Titular Bishop of Tarsus (auxiliary bishop in the Maronite Patriarchate of Antioch), Bechara Boutros al-Rahi, OMM, Titular Bishop of Caesarea Philippi (later Maronite Patriarch), Paul-Emile Saadé, Titular bishop of Apamea in Syria dei Maroniti (auxiliary bishop in Antioch and later bishop of Batroun), Antoine Torbey, eparch of Latakia and Gabriel Toubia, his successor as Archeparch of Tripoli.

Joubeir died at the age of 75 on June 4, 1994.
