= Roland Aboujaoudé =

Lebanese Catholic Maronite eparch (1930–2019)

Roland Aboujaoudé (7 September 1930 – 2 May 2019) was a Lebanese Catholic Maronite eparch of the Maronite Catholic Patriarchate of Antioch.

== Life ==
Roland Aboujaoudé was born on 7 September 1930 in Jal-Edib, Lebanon. He was ordained priest on 25 April 1959. On 12 July 1975, Aboujaoudé was appointed patriarchal vicar of Antioch and titular bishop of Arca in Phoenicia dei Maroniti. He was ordained bishop on 23 August 1975 by the hands of the Maronite Patriarch of Antioch Cardinal Anthony Peter Khoraish and his co-consecrators were Elie Farah, Archeparch of Cyprus and Joseph Merhi, MLM, Eparch of Cairo.

On 1985 Aboujaoudé was appointed Vicar general of Antioch till 1988 when he was appointed auxiliary bishop of Antioch.

Since 1997 he had been a Curial Bishop and Protosyncellus of the Maronite Patriarch.

On 6 June 2011, he presented his resignation from the post of auxiliary bishop and it was accepted by Pope Benedict XVI.

== Co-consecrator bishop ==
Roland Aboujaoudé was co-consecrator in episcopal ordinations of following bishops:

- Paul Fouad Tabet, titular bishop "pro hac vice" of Sinna (Apostolic Nuncio)
- Elias Shaheen, Eparch of Montréal
- Khalil Abi-Nader, Archeparch of Beirut
- Joseph Mohsen Béchara, Archeparch of Cyprus
- Abdallah Bared, titular bishop of Tarsus dei Maroniti and auxiliary bishop of Antioch
- Antoine Torbey, Eparch of Latakia
- Paul-Emile Saadé, titular bishop of Apamea in Syria dei Maroniti as auxiliary bishop in Antioch
- Bechara Boutros al-Rahi, OMM, Titular Bishop of Caesarea Philippi and auxiliary bishop of Antioch
- Philippe Boutros Chebaya, Eparch of Baalbek
- Pierre Callaos, Archeparch of Aleppo
- Guy-Paul Noujaim, titular bishop of Caesarea Philippi and auxiliary bishop of Antioch
- Joseph Mahfouz, OLM, Eparch of São Paulo
- Charbel Georges Merhi, CML, Eparch of Buenos Aires
- Francis Némé Baïssari, titular bishop of Aradus and auxiliary bishop of Antioch
- Paul Youssef Matar, titular bishop of Tarsus dei Maroniti and auxiliary bishop of Antioch
- Maroun Khoury Sader, Archeparch of Tyre
- Gabriel Toubia, Archeparch of Tripoli
- Joseph Khoury, titular bishop of Chonochora and auxiliary bishop of Antioch
- Paul-Mounged El-Hachem, Eparch of Baalbek
- Pierre Wadih Tayah, Eparch of Mexico
- Paul Nabil El-Sayah, Archeparch of Haifa and the Holy Land
- Tanios El Khoury, Eparch of Sidon
- Youhanna Fouad El-Hage, Archeparch of Tripoli
- Robert Joseph Shaheen, Eparch of Los Angeles
- Massoud Massoud, Eparch of Latakia
- Ad Abi Karam, Eparch of Sydney
- Mansour Hobeika, Eparch of Zahle
- Georges Saad Abi Younes, OLM, Eparch of Mexico
- Chucrallah-Nabil El-Hage, Archeparch of Tyre
- Gregory John Mansour, Eparch of Brooklyn
- Georges Bou-Jaoudé, CM, Archeparch of Tripoli
- Simon Atallah, OAM, Eparch of Baalbek
- François Eid, OMM, Eparch of Cairo
- Elias Nassar, Eparch of Sidon
