= Mansour Hobeika =

Marinate bishop

- Eparch of Zahleh
- Native name: منصور حبيقه
- Church: Maronite Church
- Diocese: Eparchy of Zahleh
- In office: 12 September 2002 – 28 October 2014
- Predecessor: Georges Scandar
- Successor: Joseph Mouawad

Orders
- Ordination: 9 June 1968
- Consecration: 26 October 2002 by Nasrallah Boutros Sfeir

Personal details
- Born: 20 December 1941 Hadath Baalbek, mandatory Lebanese Republic, French Empire
- Died: 28 October 2014 (aged 72) Paris, France

Mansour Hobeika (20 December 1941, in Hadath Baalbek – 28 October 2014, in Paris) was a Maronite bishop of the Maronite Catholic Eparchy of Zahleh in Lebanon.

== Life ==
Mansour Hobeika studied philosophy and theology at Saint Joseph University in Beirut from 1962 to 1968. He holds degrees in literature, philosophy, theology and psychology. Ordained to the priesthood on 9 June 1968, he studied canon law at the Instituto per l'Oriente Carlo Alfonso Nallino in Rome and in the Angelicum, obtained his doctorate in Oriental Canon law in Rome. He taught at the Université La Sagesse, graduating himself from a course in Islamic studies and Arabic language. In addition to Arabic, he also spoke French, Italian, German and English. Hobeika was appointed bishop of the Maronite Eparchy of Zahleh, Lebanon, on 12 September 2002, by Pope John Paul II and was ordained bishop on 26 October 2002, by the hands of Maronite Patriarch of Antioch, Cardinal Nasrallah Boutros Sfeir. His co-consecrators were Roland Aboujaoudé, auxiliary bishop of Antioch and Chucrallah Harb, Emeritus Eparch of Jounieh.Hobeika died on 28 October 2014.

== Sources ==
- Who's who in Lebanon 2005, p. 161.
- Annuario Pontificio 2007, p. 827.
