= Youhanna Rafic El Warcha =

Maronite bishop

- Auxiliary Bishop of Joubbé, Sarba and Jounieh
- Church: Maronite Church
- Diocese: Eparchy of Joubbé, Sarba and Jounieh
- Appointed: 14 June 2025
- Predecessor: Antoine Nabil Andari
- Other posts: Titular Bishop of Apamea in Syria dei Maroniti (since 2018); Curial Bishop of Antioch (since 2018)

Orders
- Ordination: 17 August 1996 by Chucrallah Harb
- Consecration: 7 April 2018 by Bechara Boutros al-Rahi

Personal details
- Born: 22 October 1971 (age 54) Okaibe, Mount Lebanon Governorate, Lebanon

Youhanna Rafik El Warcha is the auxiliary bishop for the Maronite Catholic Eparchy of Joubbé, Sarba and Jounieh, after the retirement of Bishop Antoine Nabil Andari at age 75.
