= François Ayoub =

- Archeparch of Aleppo
- Native name: فرانسوا ايوب
- Church: Maronite Church
- Archdiocese: Archeparchy of Aleppo
- In office: 16 April 1954 – 2 June 1966
- Predecessor: Ignatius Ziade
- Successor: Joseph Salamé
- Other post: Apostolic Administrator of Latakia (1954-1966)
- Previous post: Archeparch of Cyprus (1942-1954)

Orders
- Ordination: 16 May 1925
- Consecration: 14 February 1943 by Antonios Boutros Arida

Personal details
- Born: 11 July 1899 Aleppo, Aleppo Sanjak, Vilayet of Aleppo, Ottoman Empire
- Died: 2 June 1966 (aged 66)

François Ayoub (11 July 1899, Aleppo – 2 June 1966) was a Syrian Archbishop of the Maronite Catholic Archeparchy of Aleppo and the Maronite Catholic Archeparchy of Cyprus.

== Life ==
On 16 May 1925, Françoise Ayoub was ordained a priest. His appointment as Archbishop of the Maronite Catholic Archeparchy of Cyprus took place on 28 November 1942 and he was consecrated bishop on 14 February 1943 by Maronite Patriarch of Antioch Anthony Peter Arida, and his co-consecrators were Abdallah Khoury, Titular bishop of Arca in Phoenicia dei Maroniti, Elie Rischa, Eparch of Baalbek, Elie Chedid, Titular Archbishop of Cyrruhs per i Maroniti, Michael Akras, Archeparch of Aleppo and Jean Elie El-Hage, Archeparch of Damascus. In 1950, he was co-consecrator of the Maronite Patriarch of Antioch Anthony Peter Khoraish. On 16 April 1954, Ayoub was named to the Archeparchy of Aleppo and at the same time he was appointed Apostolic Administrator of the Maronite Catholic Eparchy of Latakia. He participated in the four sessions of the Second Vatican Council (1962-1965).
