= Hobeika =

Hobeika (in Arabic حبيقة) is an Arabic surname. Notable people with the surname include:

- Elie Hobeika (1956–2002), Lebanese Phalangist and Lebanese Forces commander during the Lebanese Civil War, and former MP
- Georges Hobeika (born 1962), Lebanese fashion designer
- Mansour Hobeika (1941–2014), Lebanese Maronite bishop
- Sami Hobeika (1948–2022), Lebanese singer
