= Elias Nassar =

Lebanese Maronite Catholic bishop

- Eparch Emeritus of Sidon
- Native name: الياس نصار
- Church: Maronite Church
- Diocese: Eparchy of Sidon
- In office: 28 December 2005 – 30 January 2017
- Predecessor: Tanios El Khoury
- Successor: Maroun Ammar

Orders
- Ordination: 18 August 1990
- Consecration: 11 February 2006 by Nasrallah Boutros Sfeir

Personal details
- Born: 25 October 1960 (age 65) Sarba, Mount Lebanon Governorate, Lebanon

Elias Nassar (born 25 October 1960) is the retired eparch of the Maronite Catholic Eparchy of Sidon.

== Life ==
Elias Nassar was born in Sarba, Lebanon. He was ordained priest on 18 August 1990 by Eparchy of Sidon.

The Synod of the Maronite Church elected him on 24 September 2005 to the Eparchy of Sidon. His confirmation by the Holy See took place on 28 December 2005. Maronite Patriarch of Antioch, Cardinal Nasrallah Boutros Sfeir, ordained Nassar to the episcopate and his co-consecrators were Roland Aboujaoudé, Auxiliary bishop of Antioch and Emeritus Eparch of Sidon, Tanios El Khoury, on 11 February 2006.

Elias Nassar was since 2009 President of the Episcopal Commission for the missionary cooperation among the churches. As participant in the Synod of Bishops for the Middle East in October 2010, he called emphatically about the dialogue with Islam. He praised the mutual enrichment of Christianity and Islam, and underlined that since fourteen hundred years coexistence between Christians and Muslims had been assured.

On 30 January 2017, Nassar resigned.
