= Joseph Salamé =

Lebanese politician (1914–2004)

- Archeparch of Aleppo
- Native name: چوزيف سلامه
- Church: Maronite Church
- Archdiocese: Archeparchy of Aleppo
- In office: 15 March 1967 – 9 June 1990
- Predecessor: François Ayoub
- Successor: Pierre Callaos
- Other post: Apostolic Administrator of Latakia (1967-1977)

Orders
- Ordination: 10 March 1940
- Consecration: 14 May 1967 by Paul Peter Meouchi

Personal details
- Born: 25 December 1914 Antelias, Mount Lebanon Mutasarrifate, Ottoman Empire
- Died: 29 March 2004 (aged 89)

Joseph Salamé (25 December 1914 – 29 March 2004) was a Lebanese apostolic administrator of the Maronite Catholic Eparchy of Latakia and Archeparch of the Maronite Catholic Archeparchy of Aleppo.

== Life ==
Salamé was born on 25 December 1914 in Antelias, Lebanon, the son of Baz Salamé and Jamilé Salamé. He was ordained as a priest on 10 March 1940. On 15 March 1967, he was appointed Archbishop of the Maronite Catholic Archeparchy of Aleppo and his consecration took place on 14 May 1967 by the hands of the Maronite Catholic Patriarch of Antioch, Paul Peter Meouchi, and his co-consecrators were Elie Farah, Archbishop of the Maronite Catholic Archeparchy of Cyprus and Joseph Khoury, Archbishop of the Maronite Catholic Archeparchy of Tyre. From 24 September 1967 to 4 August 1977 Salamé was also the apostolic administrator of the Laodicea of the Maronites.

On 9 June 1990, in connection with retirement, Salamé resigned from the government of the Maronite Catholic Archeparchy of Aleppo and was succeeded by Pierre Calaos.

On 29 March 2004, Joseph Salamé died at the age of 89.
