= Mounir Khairallah =

Lebanese Maronite Catholic bishop (born 1953)

- Eparch of Batroun
- Native name: منير خير الله
- Church: Maronite Church
- Diocese: Eparchy of Batroun
- Installed: 16 January 2012
- Predecessor: Paul-Emile Saadé

Orders
- Ordination: 13 September 1977
- Consecration: 25 February 2012 by Bechara Boutros al-Rahi

Personal details
- Born: 2 January 1953 (age 73) Mrah Ez Ziyat, North Governorate, Lebanon

Mounir Khairallah (born 2 January 1953) is a Lebanese Maronite Catholic hierarch who has served as the Eparch of Batroun since 16 January 2012.

== Biography ==
Khairallah was born in Mtah Ezziat in Lebanon. At a young age, he was taken into a monastery where his aunt was a member, after his parents were murdered by a Syrian farmworker.

After his primary studies made at the Capuchin Fathers of Abai, he entered in the Minor Seminary of Ghazir. Khairallah studied philosophy and theology at the Pontifical Urbaniana University in Rome.

He was ordained a priest on 13 September 1977 for the Maronite Catholic Eparchy of Batroun. After ordination, Khairallah received in Paris a master's degree in pastoral theology and catechetics, a doctorate in practical theology at the Institut Catholique de Paris and a science of religions from the Sorbonne. During his time in France (1979–1984) he worked in the parish of Notre Dame du Liban (1978–1979) and after that in Saint Medard in Paris.

Khairallah returned to Lebanon, and was appointed Secretary of the Maronite Patriarchal Synod (1985–1987), animator and professor at the Seminary of Ghazir (1985–1989) and pastor of the churches of Kfarhay and Bouksmaya Jebli (1989–1991).

From 1991 he served as Protosyncellus and pastor of the Saint Etienne Church in Batroun. Khairallah was general secretary of the four sessions of the Synod of the Maronite Church (2003–2006) and has held various positions within the Priestly League (1986–2004). He has taught at Holy Spirit University of Kaslik (1985–2000) and Karm Saddo Seminary (1996–2007).

In addition to Arabic, Khairallah speak French, English, German and Italian and also some classic languages, as Syriac, Greek, Latin and Hebrew.

His election as Eparch of Batroun was confirmed by Pope Benedict XVI on 16 January 2012. He was ordained by Maronite Patriarch of Antioch, Bechara Boutros al-Rahi, OMM, on 25 February of the same year. His co-consecrators were Paul-Emile Saadé, the retired Bishop of Batroun, and Joseph Mohsen Béchara, Archeparch of Antelias. On February 26, 2012 Khairallah was installed.
