= Maronite Catholic Eparchy of Zahleh =

Eastern Catholic eparchy in Lebanon

Eparchy of Zahleh (Maronite) Eparchia Mariamnensis Maronitarum

Location
- Country: Lebanon
- Metropolitan: Immediately subject to the Maronite Patriarch of Antioch

Statistics
- Population: (as of 2014); 50,000 (n/a%)
- Parishes: 33

Information
- Sui iuris church: Maronite
- Rite: West Syro-Antiochene Rite
- Established: 9 June 1990
- Cathedral: Saint Maron Cathedral

Current leadership
- Pope: Leo XIV
- Patriarch: Bechara Boutros al-Rahi
- Eparch: Joseph Mouawad

Maronite Catholic Eparchy of Zahleh (in Latin: Eparchia Mariamnensis Maronitarum) is an eparchy of the Maronite Church in Lebanon immediately subject to the Maronite Patriarch of Antioch. In 2014 there were 50,000 baptized. It is currently ruled by Eparch Joseph Mouawad.

== Territory and statistics ==
The eparchy includes the city and the territory of Zahleh in the Beqaa Valley, 45 kilometers east of Beirut, where is located the Saint Maron Cathedral. The territory is divided into 33 parishes and in 2014 there were 50,000 Maronite Catholics.

== History ==
The eparchy was erected on August 4, 1977, and immediately joined to the Eparchy of Baalbek. The two sees were separated on 9 June 1990. The name Mariamnensis refers to the ancient Byzantine Diocese of Mariamne.

== Eparchs ==
- See united to the Baalbek (1977-1990)

- Georges Scandar, (9 June 1990 - 8 June 2002 withdrawn)
- Mansour Hobeika, (12 September 2002 - 28 October 2014 deceased)
- Joseph Mouawad, (since 14 March 2015)

== See also ==
- Christianity in the Middle East

== Sources ==
- Annuario Pontificio, Libreria Editrice Vaticana, Città del Vaticano, 2003, ISBN 88-209-7422-3.
