= Gabriel Toubia =

Lebanese catholic priest (1930–1997)

Gabriel Toubia (born on 15 August 1930 in Darbechtar, Lebanon – died on 6 April 1997) was a Maronite Archbishop of the Maronite Catholic Archeparchy of Tripoli in Lebanon.

== Life ==
Gabriel Toubia was ordained priest on April 16, 1960. His appointment as Archbishop of Tripoli took place on 2 July 1993. On 31 July 1993 he was consecrated bishop by the Maronite Patriarch of Antioch, Cardinal Nasrallah Boutros Sfeir and his co-consecrators were Archbishop Antoine Joubeir (his predecessor) and the auxiliary bishop of Antioch, Roland Aboujaoudé. During his tenure, which lasted only three years and nine months, he assisted as co-consecrator of the ordination of Joseph Khoury, Titular bishop of Chonochora.

Toubia died on April 6, 1997.
