= Maronite Catholic Eparchy of Latakia =

Eastern Catholic eparchy in Syria

Coordinates: 35.5155°N 35.7765°E

Eparchy of Latakia Eparchia Laodicenus Maronitarum

Location
- Country: Syria

Statistics
- Population: (as of 2011); 35,000
- Parishes: 32

Information
- Denomination: Catholic Church
- Sui iuris church: Maronite Church
- Rite: West Syro-Antiochene Rite
- Established: 4 August 1977
- Cathedral: Our Lady of Latakia Cathedral
- Patron saint: Our Lady

Current leadership
- Pope: Leo XIV
- Patriarch: Bechara Boutros al-Rahi
- Eparch: Antoine Chbeir
- Bishops emeritus: Elias Khoury Sleman

The Eparchy of Latakia or Latakia of the Maronites (in Latin: Eparchia Laodicenus Maronitarum) is a Maronite Church ecclesiastical territory or eparchy of the Catholic Church in Syria. As of 2011, there were 35,000 members. The current eparch is Antoine Chbeir.

== Territory and statistics ==
It is immediately subject to the Maronite Catholic Patriarch of Antioch, not part of any ecclesiastical province.

The territory includes the city of Latakia, where the Our Lady of Latakia Cathedral is located , the former Laodicea ad Mare.

The territory is divided into 32 parishes. In 2011, there were 35,000 Maronite Catholics.

== History ==
Until the eighteenth century the Maronite patriarchate was formally divided into eparchies: in fact the bishops were all considered as auxiliary of the Patriarch, the only true leader of the Maronite nation. The bishops of Laodicea, like other Maronite bishops, in fact, had only the title of their home, and pursues not any real jurisdiction and do not even have a place to reside.

The Synod of Mount Lebanon in 1736, which at the request of Propaganda Fide decided the canonical erection of the Maronite diocese, gave no consideration to Laodicea, which therefore continued to be the seat of a titular bishop. The territories that were formally part of Laodicea were subdued by the synod of authority of the Tripoli Eparchs.

On April 16, 1954, with the decree Quo aptiori, the Congregation for the Oriental Churches decided to steal the territories of the Maronite Catholic Archeparchy of Tripoli of the Maronites who were in the Syrian's area under the authority of the archeparch of Aleppo and to entrust them to the administrator apostolic of Latakia (a missionary pre-diocesan jurisdiction, directly subject to the Holy See).

On August 4, 1977 the Apostolic Administration was raised to the status of Eparchy (Diocese), and the same time was suppressed the Titular see.

== Titular Bishops ==
- Jean Estephan (November 1732 - 1743 named eparch of Beirut)
- Nicolas Murad (5 December 1843 - 10 January 1863 deceased)
- Joseph Foraifer (11 February 1872 - ?)
- Paul Akl (22 February 1919 - 19 September 1959 deceased)

== Episcopal ordinaries ==
=== Apostolic Administrators of Latakia ===
- Apostolic Administrator ad nutum Sanctae Sedis François Ayoub (16 April 1954 – 2 June 1966), while Archeparch (Archbishop) of Aleppo of the Maronites (Syria) (16 April 1954 – 2 June 1966)
- Apostolic Administrator Joseph Salamé (24 September 1967 – 4 August 1977 resigned), also while Archeparch of Aleppo of the Maronites (Syria) (15 March 1967 – 9 June 1990)

=== Non-suffragan Eparchs (Bishops) of Latakia ===
- Georges Abi-Saber, Baladites (O.L.M.) (4 August 1977 – 2 May 1986), later Titular Bishop of Aradus (2 May 1986 – 23 November 1990) while Patriarchal Vicar of Antioch of the Maronites (Lebanon) (2 May 1986 – 23 November 1990) and finally Eparch (Bishop) of (Saint Maron of) Montreal of the Maronites (Canada) (23 November 1990 – 7 February 1996)
- Antoine Torbey (2 May 1986 – 23 June 2001 retired)
- Elias Khoury Sleman (16 January 2012 – 14 March 2015 resigned), later President of Patriarchal Appeals Tribunal of the Maronites (since 14 March 2015)
- Antoine Chbeir (since 14 March 2015)

== See also ==
- Maronite Catholic Archeparchy of Aleppo
- Maronite Catholic Archeparchy of Damascus

== Sources ==
- Pontificio Annuario, Libreria Editrice Vaticana, Città del Vaticano, 2003, ISBN 88-209-7422-3.
