= Tanios El Khoury =

Lebanese prelate (1930–2022)

His Excellency Tanios El Khoury
- Eparch of Sidon
- Appointed: 8 June 1996
- Term ended: 28 December 2005
- Predecessor: Ibrahim Hélou
- Successor: Elias Nassar

Orders
- Ordination: 14 June 1958
- Consecration: 5 October 1996 by Nasrallah Boutros Sfeir

Personal details
- Born: 4 May 1930 Saghbine, Lebanon
- Died: 20 September 2022 (aged 92)

Tanios El Khoury (4 May 1930 – 20 September 2022) was an eparch of the Maronite Catholic Eparchy of Sidon.

== Life ==
El Khoury was born in Saghbine, Lebanon. On 14 June 1958, he received his ordination to the priesthood and was incardinated in the clergy of the Eparchy of Sidon. On 8 June 1996, Pope John Paul II appointed him Eparch of Sidon. The Maronite Patriarch of Antioch, Cardinal Nasrallah Pierre Sfeir, ordained him bishop on 5 October of the same year. His co-consecrators were Boutros Gemayel, Archeparch of Cyprus, and Roland Aboujaoudé, auxiliary bishop of Antioch. On 28 December 2005, Pope Benedict XVI accepted his age-related resignation.

Catholic Church titles
Preceded by Ibrahim Hélou	Eparch of Sidon; 1996–2005	Succeeded by Elias Nassar
