= Joseph Soueif =

Former Maronite Catholic bishop of Cyprus

Joseph Antoine Soueif
- Archeparch of Tripoli
- Native name: يوسف انطوان سويف
- Church: Maronite Church
- Archdiocese: Archeparchy of Tripoli
- Appointed: 1 November 2020
- Predecessor: Georges Bou-Jaoudé
- Previous post: Archeparch of Cyprus (2008-2020)

Orders
- Ordination: 3 September 1987
- Consecration: 6 December 2008 by Nasrallah Boutros Sfeir

Personal details
- Born: 14 July 1962 (age 64) Chekka, North Governorate, Lebanon

Joseph Antoine Soueif (Arabic: يوسف انطوان سويف; born 14 July 1962) is a Lebanese clergyman serving as the Maronite Archbishop of Tripoli. He previously served as the bishop of the Maronite Catholic Archeparchy of Cyprus.

== Life ==
Joseph Soueif was born in the Lebanese town of Chekka, a coastal village in northern Lebanon, in Batroun District. He completed his secondary studies at the patriarchal seminary of St. Maron in Ghasim in 1982, and later studied theology at Holy Spirit University of Kaslik, graduating in 1987. He was ordained to the priesthood at the age of twenty-five on 3 September 1987 by the Maronite Archbishop of Tripoli Antoine Joubeir. In 1992 Soueif received his doctorate at the Pontifical Oriental Institute in Rome.

His appointment as Archbishop of Archeparchy of Cyprus was on 29 October 2008. The solemn consecration took place on 6 December 2008 being his principal consecrator His Beatitude Maronite Patriarch of Antioch, Nasrallah Boutros Sfeir and the Archbishops Boutros Gemayel of Cyprus and Georges Bou-Jaoudé of Tripoli acted as co-consecrators bishops.

He was elected on 29 October 2020 as maronite archbishop of Tripoli-Lebanon. His solemn installation mass took place on 6 December 2020 at Saint Maroun cathedral of Tripoli.
