= Anthony Peter Khoraish =

Head of the Maronite Church from 1975 to 1986

His Beatitude Moran Mor Anthony III Peter Khoraish أنطونيوس الثالث بطرس خريش
- Cardinal, Patriarch of Antioch
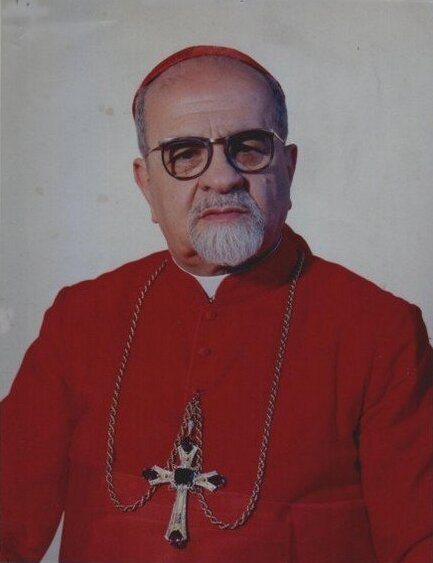
- Church: Maronite Church
- See: Patriarch of Antioch
- Elected: February 3, 1975
- Term ended: April 3, 1986
- Predecessor: Paul Peter Meouchi
- Successor: Nasrallah Boutros Sfeir

Orders
- Ordination: April 12, 1930 (Priest)
- Consecration: October 15, 1950 (Bishop) by Anthony Peter Arida
- Created cardinal: February 2, 1983 by Pope John Paul II
- Rank: Patriarch (Cardinal-Bishop)

Personal details
- Born: September 20, 1907 Ain Ebel, Vilayet of Beirut, Ottoman Empire
- Died: August 19, 1994 (aged 86) Beirut, Lebanon

Anthony III Peter Khoraish (September 20, 1907 – August 19, 1994), (or Antonios Boutros Khoraish, Antoine Pierre Khreich, Khreish, Khoraiche, Arabic: أنطونيوس الثالث بطرس خريش), was the 75th Maronite Patriarch of Antioch and the Whole Levant from 1975 until his resignation in 1986. He was made a cardinal in 1983 and died on August 19, 1994.

== Biography ==
Patriarch Anthony Khoraish was born on September 20, 1907, in Ain Ebel, a small village in the Southern Lebanon. He was a distinguished student at the local primary school in the village, and his devoutness to his faith led him at the age of 13 to Rome where he began his philosophical and theological studies at the Pontifical Urbaniana University. He received his doctorate in philosophy at the age of 16 and returned to Beirut, Lebanon where he continued his post-doctoral theological studies at the Université Saint-Joseph.

== Priesthood ==
He was ordained as priest by Maronite Patriarch of Antioch, Anthony Peter Arida at the Cathedral of Tyre in South Lebanon on April 12, 1930, where he also taught at the local Catholic school. From 1930 to 1940, he was also a faculty member of Sagesse School in Beirut teaching philosophy and apologetics, patriarchal vicar of Palestine from 1936 to 1940 and president of the Maronite tribunal in the Holy Land. He was appointed vicar general of the archdiocese of Tyre of the Maronites, and served there from 1940 to 1950.

== Episcopate ==
On April 25, 1950 Pope Pius XII appointed him auxiliary bishop of Sidon of the Maronites, and Titular Bishop of Tarsus of the Maronites, and on October 15, 1950, he was consecrated as such by Patriarch Anthony Peter Arida and his co-consecrators were Ignace Ziadé, Archeparch of Aleppo and François Ayoub, Archeparch of Cyprus,. From 1955 he was also Apostolic administrator of Sidon. On November 25, 1957, he was appointed Eparch of Sidon of the Maronites. As bishop, he attended four seasons of the Second Vatican Council from 1962 to 1965. He became administrator delegate of the Patriarchate of Antioch of the Maronites in 1974. He was also episcopal delegate for the Maronite seminaries and president of the executive commission of the Inter-ritual Assembly of Patriarchs and Bishops of Lebanon.

== Patriarchate ==
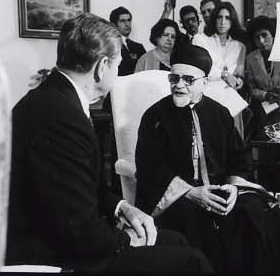
In the White House meeting with Ronald Reagan, 1981

He was elected Patriarch of Antioch and All the East on February 3, 1975, following the death of the previous patriarch. His confirmation as Patriarch was made by Holy See on February 15, 1975. As Patriarch, he attended the IV Ordinary Assembly of the World Synod of Bishops in Vatican City on September 30, 1977. Patriarch Khoraish was from 1975 to 1985 chairman of the synod of the Maronite Church and chairman of the Assembly of Catholic Patriarchs and Bishops in Lebanon. During his Patriarchate, the blessed Charbel Makhlouf was declared Saint of the Universal Church in an imposing ceremony at Saint Peter's Basilica in Rome on October 9, 1977.

== Cardinalate ==
On February 2, 1983, he was the second Maronite Patriarch to be created Cardinal. He was - as usual of Eastern Catholic Patriarchs, as a result of the motu proprio Ad purpuratorum patrum collegium - a cardinal-bishop without granting a suburbicarian diocese. As Cardinal, he attended the VI Ordinary Assembly of the World Synod of Bishops in Vatican City on September 29, 1983. Sister Rafqa Pietra Choboq Ar-Rayès (also known as Saint Rafka), a Lebanese nun of Hamlaya, was declared Blessed at Saint Peter's Basilica on November 17, 1985.

On April 3, 1986, he resigned as Maronite Patriarch of Antioch. He died on August 19, 1994, in Beirut and was buried at the see of the Maronite Catholic Patriarchate in Bkerké, Lebanon.

== Consecrations ==
During his patriarchate Khoraish ordained these Maronite eparchs:

- Roland Aboujaoudé, Titular bishop of Arca in Phoenicia dei Maroniti and Auxiliary bishop in the Maronite Patriarchate of Antioch
- Ibrahim Hélou, Eparch of Sidon
- Antoine Joubeir, Titular Archbishop of Apamea in Syria dei Maroniti and Auxiliary bishop of Tripoli
- Georges Abi-Saber, OLM, Eparch of Latakia in Syria
- Georges Skandar, Eparch of Zahlé
- Paul Fouad Tabet, Titular Archbishop of Sinna (Apostolic Nuncio)
- John George Chedid Titular bishop of Callinicum dei Maroniti and Auxiliary bishop of Brooklyn in the United States
- Elias Shaheen (Chahine), Eparch of Montréal in Canada
- Emile Eid, Titular bishop of Sarepta dei Maroniti and Curia Bishop in Rome

Khoraish was also co-consecrator of these Maronite eparchs:

- Michel Doumith, Eparchy of Tyre
- Joseph Khoury, Auxiliary Bishop of Ptolemais in Phoenicia dei Maroniti
- João Chedid, OMM, Titular bishop of Arca in Phoenicia dei Maroniti

== See also ==
- List of Maronite Patriarchs
- Maronite Church

== Sources ==
- Great Encyclopedia of John Paul II, Edipresse Warsaw 2005, ISBN 83-60160-07-4.
- Lentz, Harris M. (2002). Popes and Cardinals of the 20th Century: A Biographical Dictionary. McFarland & Company. pp. 98–99. ISBN 9780786410941.
- Antonios Khoreiche, in: International Biographical Archive 44/1994 of 24 October 1994, in the Munzinger archive (beginning of the article freely available): http://www.munzinger.de/search/go/document.jsp?id=00000014219

Catholic Church titles
Preceded by Paul Peter Meouchi	Maronite Patriarchs of Antioch; 1975–1986	Succeeded by Nasrallah Boutros Sfeir
