= Ibrahim Hélou =

Lebanese archbishop (1925–1996)

Ibrahim Hélou (27 March 1925 in Jezzine, Lebanon – 3 February 1996) was a Lebanese eparch of the Maronite Catholic Eparchy of Sidon.

== Life ==
Ibrahim Hélou was born in Jezzine, Lebanon. On 22 December 1951 he was ordained to the priesthood. On 12 July 1975 he received the appointment of Bishop of Sidon and on 23 August 1975 received his ordination to the episcopate from Archbishop Anthony Peter Khoraish, Maronite Patriarch of Antioch. His co-consecrators were Archeparch Elie Farah of Cyprus and Bishop Joseph Merhi, MLM, Eparch of Cairo.

In 1985 Hélou was appointed by Pope John Paul II Apostolic administrator of the Maronite Patriarchate of Antioch. In this capacity he was also president of the Episcopal Conference of the Lebanese Patriarch and bishops. In recognition of this, until 1986, he worked with the Pope and was appointed by him on 7 May 1986 Archbishop "ad personam". Until his death on 3 February 1996, he remained bishop of Sidon. He was co-consecrator of some Maronite eparchs: Georges Abi-Saber, OLM, Eparch of Latakia, Georges Scandar, Eparch of Baalbek and Zahle, Emile Eid, Titular Bishop of Sarepta dei Maroniti and Roman Curia Bishop, Abdallah Bared, Titular bishop of Tarsus dei Maroniti and Auxiliary bishop of the Maronite Patriarchate of Antioch, Bechara Boutros al-Rahi, OMM, Titular Bishop of Caesarea Philippi and Auxiliary bishop of Antioch, Paul-Emilie Saadé, Titular bishop of Apamea in Syria dei Maroniti and Auxiliary bishop of Antioch, and Antoine Torbey, Eparch of Latakia.

== See also ==
- Catholic Church in Lebanon
