= Ignatius Ziade =

Lebanese Maronite archbishop (1906–1994)

- Archeparch of Beirut
- Native name: إغناطيوس زياده
- Church: Maronite Church
- Archdiocese: Archeparchy of Beirut
- In office: 26 January 1952 – 4 April 1986
- Predecessor: Ignace Mobarak
- Successor: Khalil Abi-Nader
- Previous post: Eparch of Aleppo (1946-1952)

Orders
- Ordination: 26 May 1929
- Consecration: 24 November 1946 by Antonios Boutros Arida

Personal details
- Born: 26 January 1906 Herharaya, Mount Lebanon Mutasarrifate, Ottoman Empire
- Died: 31 March 1994 (aged 88) Beirut, Lebanon

Ignatius Ziadé (also Ignace Ziade; Arabic: إغناطيوس زياده, 26 January 1906 – 31 March 1994) was the Archbishop of the Maronite Catholic Archeparchy of Aleppo and the Maronite Catholic Archeparchy of Beirut.

== Life ==
Igntius Ziadé was born in Herharaya in the Keserwan District, Mount Lebanon Governorate, in Lebanon. He was consecrated to priesthood at the age of 23 on 26 May 1929 in Syria. On 27 April 1946 he was appointed Bishop of the Maronite Catholic Archeparchy of Aleppo. His episcopal ordination was celebrated on 24 November 1946 by then-Maronite Patriarch of Antioch Anthony Peter Arida, and his co-consecrators were François Ayoub, Archeparch of Cyprus and Pietro Dib, Eparch of Cairo. On 26 January 1952 Ziadé he was appointed to the seat Maronite Archbishop of Beirut. At the age of 80 years Ignatus Ziadé presented his resignation on 4 April 1986. Emeritus Archbishop Ignatius Ziadé died at the age of 88 years, on 31 March 1994 in Beirut. Ziadé had been for 65 years as Maronite priest and bishop for 47 years. In these decades of his pastoral ministry, he served as co-consecrator of Elie Farah, Abdallah Bared, Antoine Torbey, Paul-Emile Saadé, and Bechara Boutros al-Rahi.
