= Maronite Catholic Archeparchy of Tripoli =

Eastern Catholic archeparchy in Lebanon

Coordinates: 34.4375°N 35.8430°E

Archeparchy of Tripoli (Maronite) Archieparchia Tripolitanus Maronitarum

Location
- Country: Lebanon
- Metropolitan: Immediately subject to the Maronite Patriarch of Antioch

Statistics
- Population: (as of 2014); 147,800 (n/a%)
- Parishes: 126

Information
- Sui iuris church: Maronite
- Rite: West Syro-Antiochene Rite
- Established: 5 September 1965
- Cathedral: Saint Michael Cathedral

Current leadership
- Pope: Leo XIV
- Patriarch: Bechara Boutros al-Rahi
- Archeparch: Youssef Soueif

The Maronite Catholic Archeparchy of Tripoli (Tripoli of the Maronites) (in Latin: Archieparchia Tripolitanus Maronitarum) is a non-Metropolitan Archeparchy (Eastern Catholic archdiocese) of the Maronite Church in the north-west of Lebanon.

It is immediately subject to the Maronite Patriarch of Antioch (not part of any Ecclesiastical province) and the Roman Congregation for the Oriental Churches. It is currently ruled by Archeparch Youssef Soueif. Its archeparchial (archiepiscopal) seat is the Saint Michael Cathedral in the city of Tripoli (Arabic Tarabulus as-Sam) in Lebanon.

== Statistics ==
As per 2014 the archeparchy pastorally served 147,800 baptized Eastern Catholics in 126 parishes and 3 missions with 190 priests (130 diocesan, 60 religious), 206 lay religious (66 brothers, 140 sisters) and 6 seminarians.

== History ==
The eparchy dates back to the seventeenth century, but was canonically erected in the Maronite Synod of Mount Lebanon in 1736 as Arch?Eparchy (Arch?diocese) of Tripoli / Tripoli del Libano (Curiate Italian) / Tarabulus / Tripolitan(us) Maronitarum (Latin). Initially it included all the coastal territory from Tripoli to Latakia.

- In 1840 it acquired a dozen of villages from Maronite Catholic Eparchy of Byblos, by order of the Propaganda Fide.

Joseph Assemani, Archbishop of Tripoli, attended the First Vatican Council in 1869–1870, called upon by Pope Pius IX. Assemani, of the famous family of Maronite clerics, was born in Hasseroun on 31 March 1821. Well versed in Italian and Latin, he was sent to Rome to the Pontifical Urban University to study theology and French. He was ordained a priest in Rome by Cardinal Fransoni, Prefect of the Sacred Congregation for the Propagation of the Faith. He returned to Lebanon, where he was appointed confessor to the Maronite Patriarch. He was a professor of Italian, Latin and philosophy before being named Vicar General of the Maronite Patriarchy in Tripoli. He was named Maronite Chorbishop of Tripoli in 1856. With the assistance of the French Consul, Mr. Planche, he was able to obtain from Fuad Pasha a plot of land to establish a Maronite cemetery and hospital. He established in Tripoli the Brotherhood of the Immaculate Conception, repaired the Church of the Virgin Mary, and obtained an Ottoman firman to build a church in Tripoli, the first of its kind since the Crusades. According to his biography, he suffered numerous vexations while representing the Maronites in Tripoli. In 1860, his home was attacked and pillaged during the night. He was arrested twice and often attacked, before being exiled by the Ottoman governor in 1867. In 1869 he joined the Maronite delegation attending the First Vatican Council in Rome, serving as the Maronite delegation's official interpreter due to his knowledge of Latin, French and Italian.

- On April 16, 1954, the Arch?Eparchy gave a part of its territory to Syria in favor of the erection of the Apostolic Administration of Latakia.
- ? On September 5, 1965, the Eparchy of Tripoli was elevated to the rank of Archeparchy by Pope Paul VI.

== Archeparchial hierarchs ==
Joseph Assemani, Chorbishop and Archbishop of Tripoli (1856–1878)

Archeparchs (Archbishops) of Tripoli

- ? Isaac (25 March 1629 ordered -? deceased)
- ? Michael Hasrouni (before 1661 – after 1673)
- ? Gabriel
- ? Joseph Hesronita (before 1676 – after 1694)
- Jacob Awad (1698 – 21 February 1706), next Maronite Patriarch of Antioch ([1705.11.06] 1706.02.21 – death 1733.02.12)
- Elias al-Gemayel (1706 – 1716 deceased)
- Basil (before 1733 – after 1736)
- German (mentioned in 1746)
- Tobias El Khazen (1755 – 28 March 1757 confirmed Maronite Patriarch of Antioch)
- Raphael Haklani (prior to 17 July 1779 – after 1787)
- Ignatius Gazeno (before 1795 – after 1809)
- Joseph Peter Hobaish (30 January 1820 consecrated – 3 May 1824 confirmed Maronite Patriarch of Antioch)
- Paul Moise Musa (2 March 1826 -?)
- Joseph El Khazen (April 6, 1830 – January 19, 1846 confirmed Maronite Patriarch of Antioch)
- Joseph Assemani (?-1878)
- Estephan Auad (Stefano Evodius), (15 December 1878 consecrated – April 1908 deceased)
- Anthony Peter Arida (7 June 1908 – 13 March 1933 confirmed Maronite Patriarch of Antioch)
- Antoine Abed (23 April 1933 – 15 September 1975 deceased)
- Antoine Joubeir (4 August 1977 – 2 July 1993 withdrawn)
- Gabriel Toubia (2 July 1993 – 6 April 1997 deceased)
- Youhanna Fouad El-Hage (7 June 1997 – 4 May 2005 deceased)
- Georges Bou-Jaoudé (Aboujaoude), CM, (28 December 2005 – 1 November 2020)

== See also ==
- List of Catholic dioceses in Lebanon
- Christianity in the Middle East

== Sources and external links ==
- GCatholic – date for all sections
- Joseph Assemani Biography
- Joseph Assemani biography as Vatican Interpreter
- http://www.catholic-hierarchy.org/diocese/dtrim.html

Bibliography

- Annuario Pontificio, Libreria Editrice Vaticana, Città del Vaticano. 2003, ISBN 88-209-7422-3.
