= Monastery of the Holy Saviour, Kreim =

Monastery in Lebanon

The Monastery of the Holy Savior (kreim-Ghosta) is the Mother House where the Congregation of Maronite Lebanese Missionaries was founded in 1865. Given the name "Christ the Savior", the monastery was built in 1718 with the Armenian Monks along with their first Patriarch, Abraham Petros I Ardzivian (Armenian: Աբրահամ Պետրոս Ա. Արծիւեան; 1679 – 1749), and bishops from Aleppo. After they evacuated it and moved to Bzoummar and Kheshbao convents, Bishop Youhanna Habib bought it with the surrounding properties, restored it and endowed it for the Congregation. From it, the missionaries started their mission in Lebanon and abroad.

After the death of the founder in 1894, considerable additions were built over time. The monastery ran a free school for children of neighboring villages, as well as encompassing courtyards, squares, gardens and cemeteries. In the church, there is an Italian artistic painting representing the Holy Trinity and Christ Crucified that dates back to the 13th century. The convent constituted the Headquarters of the Congregation and the Novitiate.
