= Guy-Paul Noujaim =

Maronite bishop

Guy-Paul Noujaim (born 7 July 1935 in Kfartay, Lebanon) is a Lebanese eparch and emeritus Auxiliary bishop of the Maronite Catholic Eparchy of Joubbé, Sarba and Jounieh.

== Life ==
Guy-Paul Noujaim received on 11 June 1967 his priestly ordination. Pope John Paul II appointed him on June 9, 1990, Auxiliary bishop of Joubbé, Sarba and Jounieh and Titular Bishop of Caesarea Philippi. From 9 June 1990 to 1995 he was Patriarchal vicar of Antioch.

Maronite Patriarch of Antioch, Cardinal Nasrallah Boutros Sfeir, ordained him on 12 August 1990 to the episcopate. His co-consecrators were Roland Aboujaoudé, Auxiliary Bishop of Antioch, and Bechara Boutros al-Rahi, OMM, Bishop of Jbeil.

On 16 June 2012, Guy-Paul Noujaim by age-reasons resigned as Auxiliary Bishop of Joubbé, Sarba and Jounieh.
