= Maronite Catholic Eparchy of Byblos =

Eastern Catholic eparchy in Lebanon

Eparchy of Byblos (Maronite) Eparchia Bybliensis Maronitarum
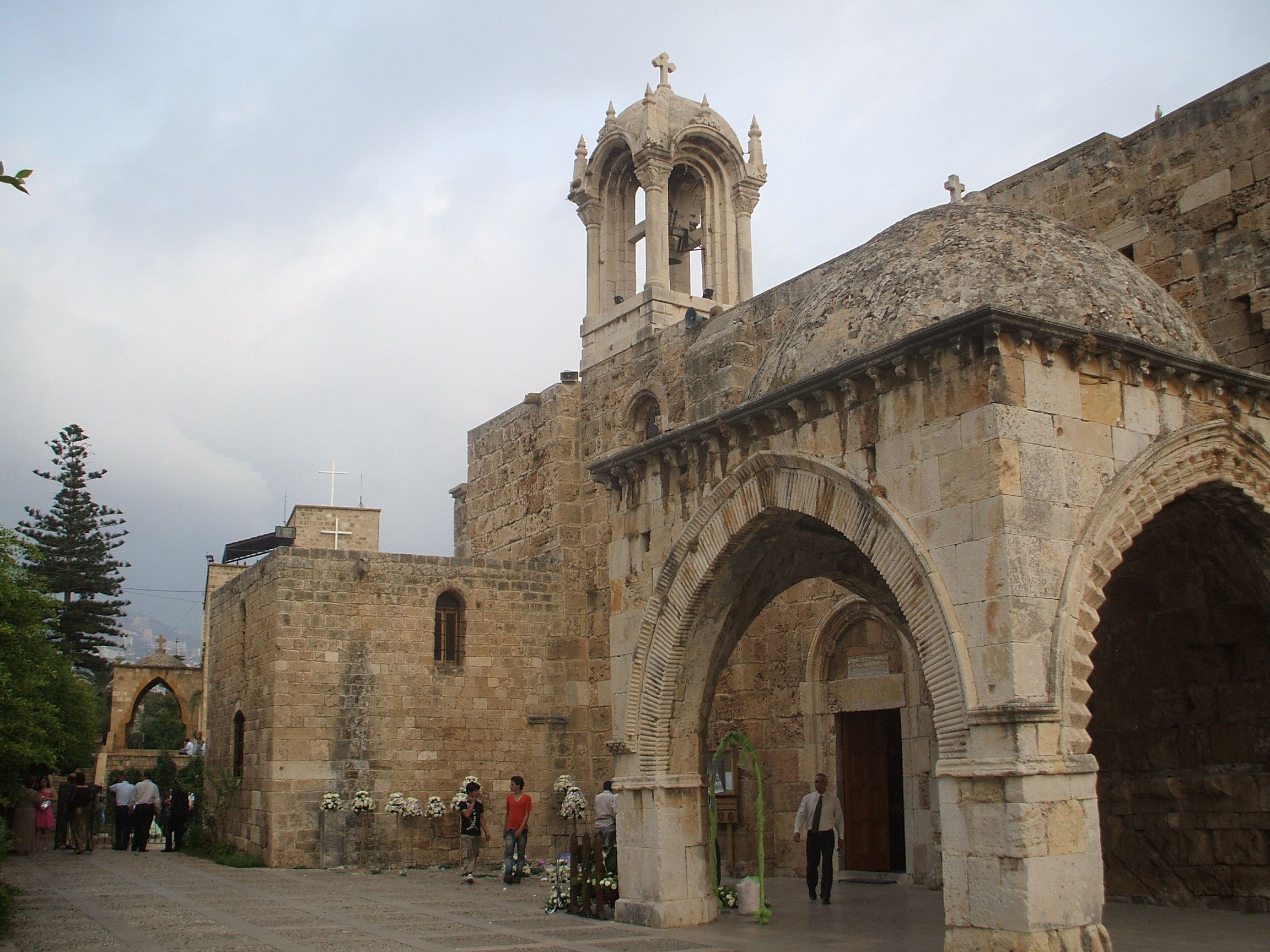

Location
- Country: Lebanon
- Metropolitan: Michel Aoun

Statistics
- Population: (as of 2013); 160,000 (n/a%)
- Parishes: 68

Information
- Sui iuris church: Maronite
- Rite: West Syro-Antiochene Rite
- Established: 9 June 1990
- Cathedral: Saint John Mark Cathedral

Current leadership
- Pope: Leo XIV
- Patriarch: Bechara Boutros al-Rahi
- Eparch: Michel Aoun

Maronite Catholic Eparchy of Byblos (in Latin: Eparchia Bybliensis Maronitarum) is an eparchy of the Maronite Church immediately subject to the Maronite Patriarch of Antioch in Lebanon. In 2013 there were 160,000 baptized. It is currently governed by Eparch Michel Aoun.

== Territory ==
The eparchy includes the Byblos District in Lebanon. Its eparchial seat is the city of Byblos, where is located the Saint John Mark Cathedral.

The territory is divided into 68 parishes and in 2013 there were 160,000 Maronite Catholics.

== History ==
The eparchy of Byblos was erected on June 12, 1673, and its canonical erection was confirmed in the Maronite Synod of Mount Lebanon in 1736. In 1768 it was united to Eparchy of Batroun. In 1848 the seat of the Eparchy Byblos-Batroun became the Maronite Patriarch of Antioch's seat.

On June 9, 1990, it was separated from Batroun and assumed its present name.

== Eparchs ==
- Joseph (mentioned on 12 June 1673)
- John Abacuch (mentioned in 1694)
- Joseph (mentioned on 5 October 1699)
- Philip (mentioned in 1736)

- Seat of the Patriarch (1848–1990)

- Bechara Boutros al-Rahi, OMM (June 9, 1990 - March 15, 2011 confirmed Maronite Patriarch of Antioch)
- Michel Aoun, (since June 16, 2012)

== See also ==
- Maronite Church

== Sources ==
- Annuario Pontificio, Libreria Editrice Vaticana, Città del Vaticano, 2003, ISBN 88-209-7422-3.
