= Antoine Nabil Andari =

Current auxiliary bishop of the Maronite Patriarchal Eparchy of Jounieh

His Grace, Mor Antoine Nabil Andari
- Auxiliary Bishop Emeritus to Maronite Patriarchal Eparchy of Jounieh
- Church: Maronite Church
- Diocese: Maronite Catholic Eparchy of Joubbé, Sarba and Jounieh
- Predecessor: Chucrallah Harb
- Successor: Youhanna Rafic El Warcha
- Previous post: titular bishop of Tarsus

Orders
- Ordination: August 27, 1977 by Nasrallah Boutros Sfeir
- Consecration: November 1, 1997 by Nasrallah Boutros Sfeir, Francis Némé Baïssari, Joseph Mohsen Béchara

Personal details
- Born: August 11, 1949 (age 76) Chekka, North Lebanon
- Denomination: Eastern Catholicism

Styles of Antoine Nabil Andari
- Reference style: His Grace; The Most Reverend
- Spoken style: His Grace
- Religious style: Auxiliary bishop

Antoine Nabil Andari (born 8 November 1949 in Billa, Lebanon) is Curial Bishop of the Maronite Catholic Patriarchate of Antioch and emeritus Auxiliary Bishop to Jounieh.

== Life ==
Antoine Nabil Andari received on 27 August 1977 the sacrament of ordination to the priesthood. As a priest:

1978 - 1985 :Assistant priest of the Parish of Chekka

1982 - 1983 and 1988 - 1989 :Professor at the Faculty of Theology of the Holy Spirit University of Kaslik

1986 - 1995 :Rector of the Maronite Patriarchal Seminary - Ghazir.

1987 - 1995 :Secretary of the Association of Major Catholic Seminaries in Lebanon.

1995 - 1997 :Assistant priest of Our Lady of Lebanon - Paris

On 7 June 1997 he was appointed by Pope John Paul II titular bishop of Tarsus dei Maroniti and was named Curial Bishop of the Maronite Patriarchate of Antioch. Maronite Patriarch of Antioch Cardinal Nasrallah Boutros Sfeir ordained him on 1 November of the same year to the episcopate. His co-consecrators were the auxiliary bishop of the diocese of Joubbé and Sarba, Francis Némé Baïssari, and the Archbishop of the Archeparchy of Antelias, Joseph Mohsen Béchara.

== Certificates ==
He completed his secondary studies at Saint Maron Seminary - Ghazir

June 1970: Baccalaureate Second Division - Philosophy.

July 1974: Teaching degree in Philosophy.

June 1977: Bachelor of Theology.

1977 - 1978 In-depth lessons in philosophy DEA

He completed his university studies at Saint Joseph University - Beirut, and the Catholic University of Louvain - Belgium.

He is fluent in Arabic, French, English, Latin and Syriac.
