= Michel Aoun (bishop) =

Lebanese priest, bishop of Jbeil

Michael Aoun
- Eparch of Byblos
- Native name: ميشال عون
- Church: Maronite Church
- Diocese: Eparchy of Byblos
- Appointed: 16 January 2012
- Predecessor: Bechara Boutros al-Rahi

Orders
- Ordination: 9 June 1984
- Consecration: 25 February 2012 by Bechara Boutros al-Rahi

Personal details
- Born: 2 June 1959 (age 67) Damour, Mount Lebanon Governorate, Lebanon

Michel Aoun (born 2 June 1959 in Damour, Lebanon) is the current Eparch of the Maronite Catholic Eparchy of Byblos.

== Life ==
Michel Aoun received on 9 June 1984 his priestly ordination.

Pope Benedict XVI confirmed on 16 January 2012 his election as Eparch of Byblos. Maronite Patriarch of Antioch, Cardinal Bechara Boutros al-Rahi, OMM, ordained him on 25 February 2012 to the episcopate. His co-consecrators were Samir Mazloum, retired Curial bishop of Antioch, and Paul Youssef Matar, Archeparch of Beirut. Aoun was introduced into the office on 26 February of the same year.
