= Maronite Catholic Eparchy of Sidon =

Eastern Catholic eparchy in Lebanon

Eparchy of Sidon (Maronite) Eparchia Sidoniensis Maronitarum
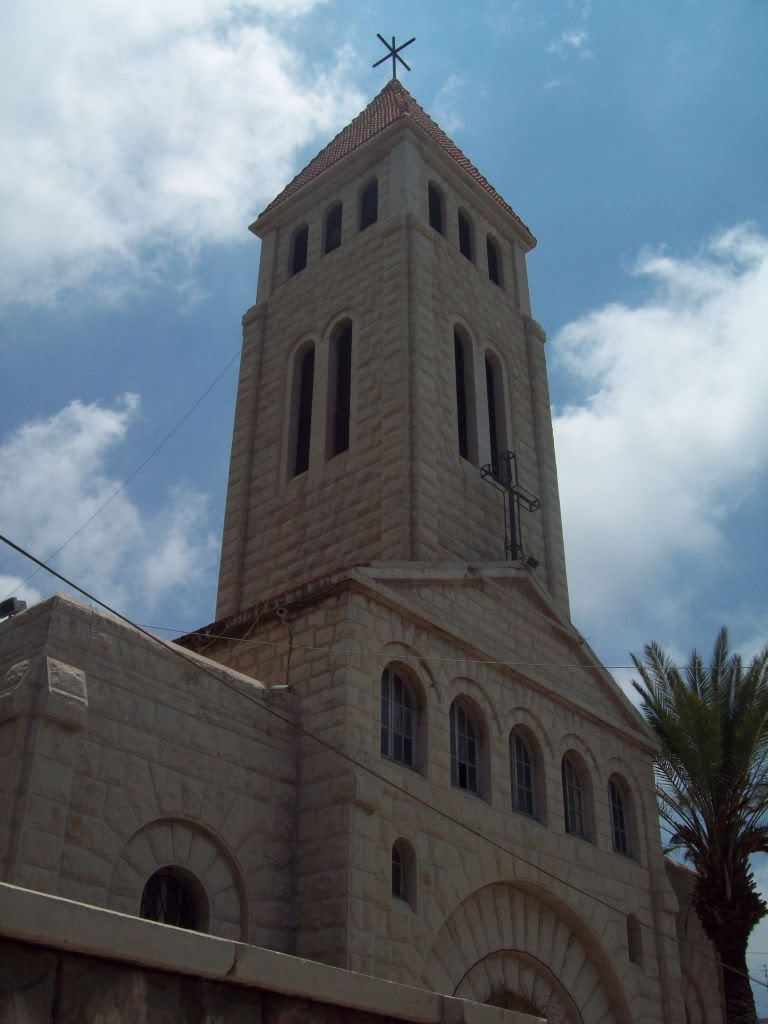

Location
- Country: Lebanon
- Metropolitan: Immediately subject to the Maronite Patriarch of Antioch

Statistics
- Population: (as of 2014); 156,000 (n/a%)
- Parishes: 104

Information
- Sui iuris church: Maronite
- Rite: West Syro-Antiochene Rite
- Established: 18 February 1900
- Cathedral: Saint Elias Cathedral

Current leadership
- Pope: Leo XIV
- Patriarch: Bechara Boutros al-Rahi
- Eparch: Maroun Ammar
- Bishops emeritus: Elias Nassar

Maronite Catholic Eparchy of Sidon (in Latin: Eparchia Sidoniensis Maronitarum) is an eparchy of the Maronite Church immediately subject to the Maronite Patriarch of Antioch in Lebanon. In 2014 there were 156,000 baptized. It is currently headed by bishop Maroun Ammar.

== Territory and statistics ==
The eparchy extends its jurisdiction over the Maronite faithful in the region around the city of Sidon (Saida in Arabic). Its eparchial seat is the city of Sidon, where is located the Saint Elias Cathedral.

The territory is divided into 104 parishes and in 2014 there were 156,000 Maronite Catholics.

== History ==
The eparchy dates from the beginning of the Maronite Church, united to the See of Tyre. The first information about the Eparchy of Sidon is related to 1626, when the bishop of Sidon Youssef Khalib el-Akouri is mentioned. In 1646 he was elected Patriarch of Antioch. The name of the bishop of Sidon Gabriel is also mentioned in 1736, when the Synod of Mount Lebanon canonically established the Eparchy of Tyre-Sidon and he participated. The two cities of the former eparchy were separated and the Eparchy of Tyre was created on February 18, 1900 (or according to other sources 26 January 1906).

== Eparchs ==
- Youssef Halib el-Akouri (1626 consecrated - 29 November 1646 appointed Maronite Patriarch of Antioch)
- John (mentioned on 12 June 1673)
- Gabriel (mentioned in 1733)

=== Eparchy of Tyre-Sidon ===
- United from 1736 to 1900

=== Eparchs of Sidon ===
- Paul Basbous, (February 18, 1900 ordered - September 7, 1918 deceased)
- Augustin Bostani, (February 23, 1919 - October 30, 1957 deceased)
- Anthony Peter Khoraish, (November 25, 1957 - February 15, 1975 appointed Maronite Patriarch of Antioch)
- Ibrahim Hélou, (July 12, 1975 - February 3, 1996 deceased)
- Tanios El Khoury, (June 8, 1996 - 2005 retired)
- Elias Nassar, (September 24, 2005 - June 17, 2017 retired)
- Maroun Ammar, (since June 17, 2017)

== See also ==
- Christianity in Lebanon
