= Maronite Catholic Eparchy of Joubbé, Sarba and Jounieh =

Eastern Catholic eparchy in Lebanon

Coordinates: 33.9667°N 35.6333°E

Eparchy of Joubbé, Sarba and Jounieh (Maronite) Eparchia Ioubbensis, Sarbensis et Iuniensis Maronitarum الأبرشية البطريركية المرونية نيابة صربا

Location
- Country: Lebanon
- Metropolitan: Immediately subject to the Maronite Patriarch of Antioch

Statistics
- Population: (as of 2013); 396,250 (n/a%)
- Parishes: 149

Information
- Sui iuris church: Maronite
- Rite: West Syro-Antiochene Rite
- Established: 5 June 1999

Current leadership
- Pope: Leo XIV
- Patriarch: Bechara Boutros al-Rahi
- Eparch: Bechara Boutros al-Rahi
- Auxiliary Bishops: Youhanna Rafic El Warcha to Jounieh, Paul Rouhana, OLM, to Sarba, Joseph Nafaa, to Joubbé
- Bishops emeritus: Guy-Paul Noujaim; Antoine Nabil Andari

Website
- http://www.niabatsarba.com

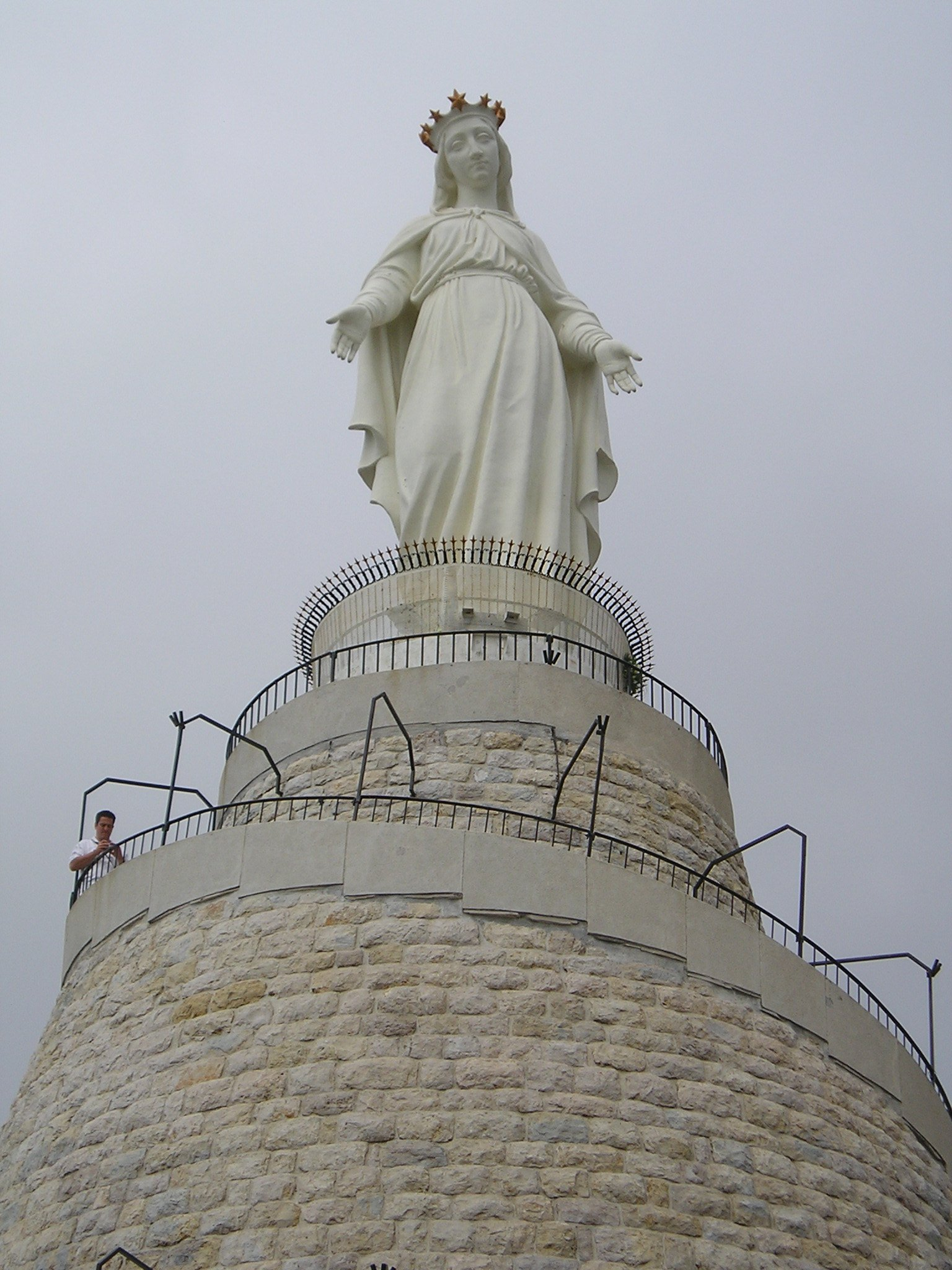
Statue of sanctuary of Our Lady of Lebanon of Harissa in Jounieh.

Maronite Catholic Eparchy of Joubbé, Sarba and Jounieh (in Latin: Eparchia Ioubbensis, Sarbensis et Iuniensis Maronitarum) is an eparchy of the Maronite Church immediately subject to the Maronite Patriarch of Antioch in Lebanon. In 2013 there were 396,250 baptized. It is currently governed by the Maronite Patriarch, Cardinal Bechara Boutros al-Rahi, OMM.

== Territory and statistics ==
The eparchy extends its jurisdiction over the Maronite faithful living in the north-central part of the Mount Lebanon Governorate, in Lebanon. Its eparchial seat is the city of Jounieh.

The territory is divided into 149 parishes and in 2013 there were 396,250 Maronite Catholics.

== History ==
The Eparchy of Sarba was erected on December 11, 1959 with the bull Orientalis Ecclesiae of Pope John XXIII, with territory taken of the Eparchy of Damascus (today archeparchy). The Eparchy of Jounieh was erected on August 4, 1977.

The eparchy of Joubbé was erected on May 2, 1986. On June 9, 1990 the eparchies of Joubbé and Sarba were united, together with Batroun.

On June 5, 1999 the eparchies of Joubbé and Sarba were united to the Eparchy of Jounieh, while Batroun again became an independent ecclesiastical district.

The eparchy is the home of its patriarch of Antioch of the Maronites, which governs the three dioceses by three patriarchal vicars.

== Center of Pilgrimage ==
Harissa, that has a statue of the Our Lady of Lebanon, is a center of pilgrimage for the faithful of the Maronite Church.

== Eparchs ==
=== Bishops of Sarba ===
- Michael Doumith (December 11, 1959 – February 25, 1989 deceased)

=== Bishops of Jounieh ===
- Chucrallah Harb (August 4, 1977 – June 5, 1999 withdrawn)

=== Bishops of Joubbé ===
- Nasrallah Boutros Sfeir (May 2, 1986 – June 9, 1990)

=== Bishops of Joubbé, Sarba and Batroun ===
- Nasrallah Boutros Sfeir (June 9, 1990 – June 5, 1999)

=== Bishops of Joubbé, Sarba and Jounieh ===
- Nasrallah Boutros Sfeir (June 5, 1999 – February 26, 2011 resigned)
- Bechara Boutros al-Rahi, OMM, (since 15 March 2011)

=== Auxiliary bishops ===
- Maroun Ammar, (since June 16, 2012, Titular bishop of Canatha)
- Paul Rouhana, OLM, (since from June 16, 2012, Titular bishop of Antarados)
- Antoine Nabil Andari
- Youhanna Rafic El Warcha

== Sources ==
- Pontificio Annuario, Libreria Editrice Vaticana, Città del Vaticano, 2003, ISBN 88-209-7422-3.

== See also ==
- Maronite Church
