= Maronite Catholic Eparchy of Batroun =

Eastern Catholic eparchy in Lebanon

Eparchy of Batroun (Maronite) Eparchia Botryensis Maronitarum
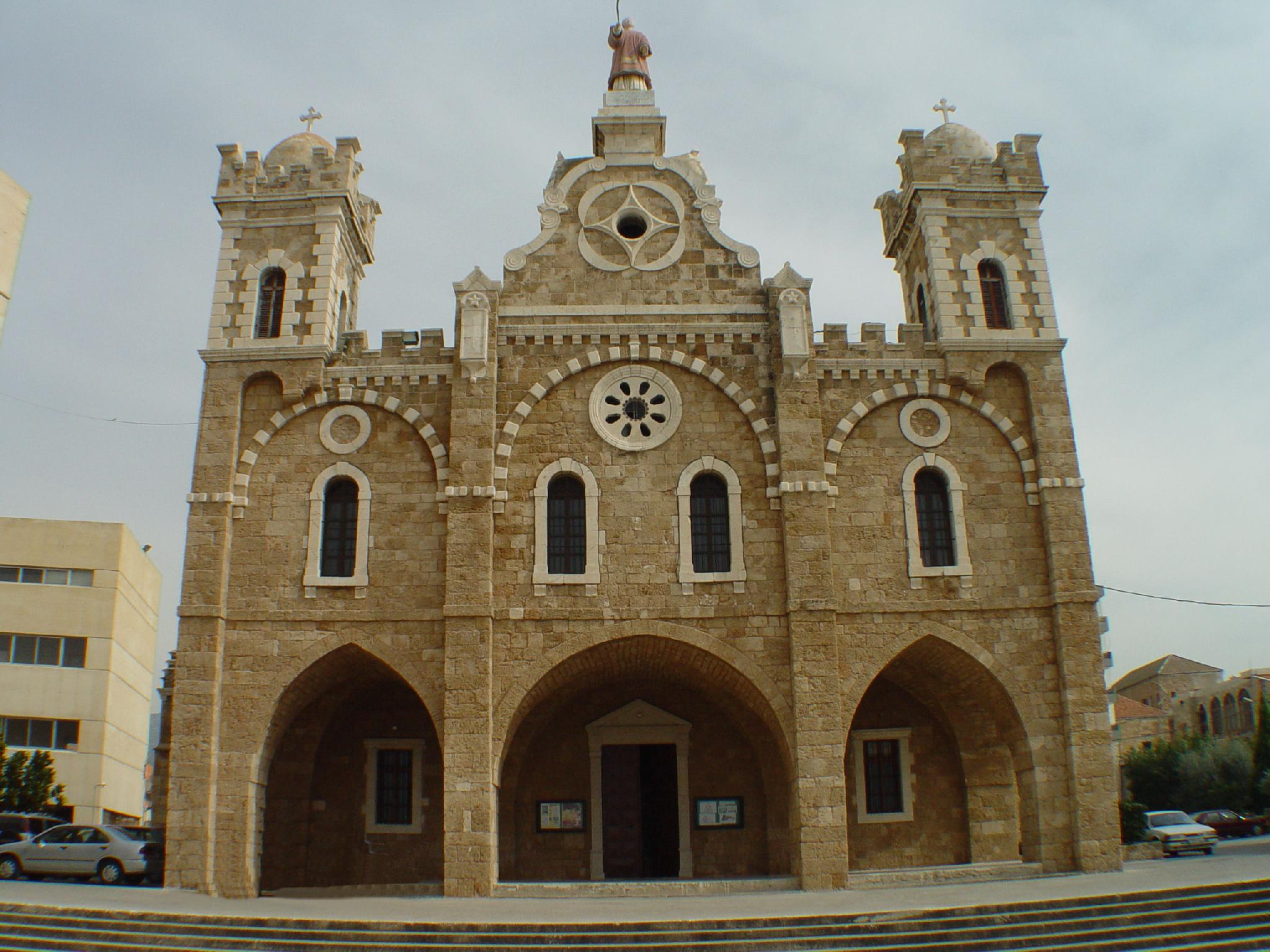

Location
- Country: Lebanon
- Metropolitan: Immediately subject to the Maronite Patriarch of Antioch
- Headquarters: Lebanon

Statistics
- Population: (as of 2012); 70,000 (n/a%)
- Parishes: 66

Information
- Denomination: Eastern Catholic Churches
- Sui iuris church: Maronite
- Rite: West Syro-Antiochene Rite
- Established: 5 June 1999
- Cathedral: Saint Stephen Cathedral

Current leadership
- Pope: Leo XIV
- Patriarch: Bechara Boutros al-Rahi
- Eparch: Mounir Khairallah

Website
- http://www.diocesebatroun.org/

Maronite Catholic Eparchy of Batroun (in Latin: Eparchia Botryensis Maronitarum) is an eparchy of the Maronite Church located in Batroun, Lebanon. In 2012 there were 70,000 baptized. It is currently governed by Eparch Mounir Khairallah.

== Territory and statistics ==
The diocese has its seat in Batroun, in the North Governorate, where is located the Saint Stephen Cathedral. In 2012 there were 70,000 Maronite Catholics and its territory was divided into 66 parishes.

== History ==
The eparchy, which includes Catholic bishops since the seventeenth century, in 1678 was united to the eparchy of Byblos. It was canonically erected by the Maronite Synod of Mount Lebanon in 1736. In 1848 it became an eparchy of the Maronite Patriarch of Antioch. On June 9, 1990 it was separated from the eparchy of Byblos and united to Joubbé and Sarba (today Maronite Catholic Eparchy of Joubbé, Sarba and Jounieh).

The last division took place on June 5, 1999, when the Eparchy of Batroun became an independent ecclesiastical structure. From this date it is not governated by Maronite patriarch.

== Eparchs ==
- Youhanna Habqoug Albecha'alani (1691)
- Stephen El Douaihy (20 November 1728 - after 1746)
- Paul Stephen al- Ghostawi (1790 - 1808)
- Germano Thabet (March 1810 - 4 June 1833)

== Seat of the Patriarch ==
- Maronite Patriarch of Antioch

== Eparchs ==
- Paul-Emile Saadé, (June 5, 1999 - June 5, 2011 withdrawn)
- Mounir Khairallah, (since 16 January 2012)

== Sources ==
- Annuario Pontificio, Libreria Editrice Vaticana, Città del Vaticano, 2003, ISBN 88-209-7422-3.
- http://booksnow1.scholarsportal.info/ebooks/oca3/1/dictionnairedhis09bauduoft/dictionnairedhis09bauduoft.pdf, vol. IX, Paris 1937, col. 1421.

== See also ==
- Christianity in Lebanon
