= Bkerké =

Episcopal see in the Maronite Church

Coordinates: 33°58′05″N 35°38′01″E

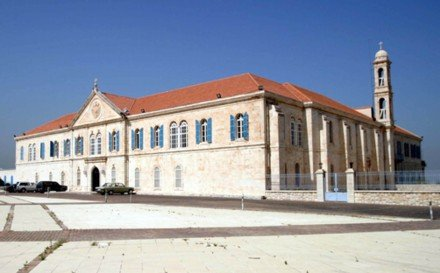
Bkerke, Maronite Patriarchate

Bkerké (Arabic: بْكِرْكِي) is the episcopal see of the Maronite Catholic Patriarchate of Antioch of the Maronite Church in Lebanon, located 350 m above the bay of Jounieh, northeast of Beirut, in Lebanon.

Though now exclusively used by the church, the area was owned by the noble Khazen family. The clergy use it under a special waqf.

== History ==
Ottoman tax records indicate Bkerké (called Bikarkiyya) had 15 Christian households and five bachelors in 1523, 20 Christian households in 1530, and 12 Christian households and four bachelors in 1543.

The earliest building on the Bkerké site was a monastery constructed in 1703 by Khattar al-Khazen. In 1730, Antonine monks began using the monastery. In 1750, Bishop Germanus Saqar and the nun Hindiyya al-'Ujaimi used it for the Sacred Heart of Jesus religious order. Finally, in 1779, it came into use by the Maronite church, and in 1830 it became the winter residence of the Lebanon's Maronite Patriarch. The present red roofed structure was built in 1893 during the time of Patriarch John Peter El Hajj. It was designed by Leonard al-Azari.

Since its creation around 858 AD, the see of the Maronite Catholic Patriarchate has never been in Antioch. Instead, it was originally in Kfarhay in the Batroun mountains, and then continued to move to various locations in the Byblos mountains for the next 500 years, such as Yanouh, Mayfouq, Lehfed, Habeel, Kfifan, al-Kafr, and Hardeen. It then moved to Qannoubine in the Kadisha Valley because of intensified persecution and remained there from 1440 to 1823 when it moved to Dimane and lastly, in 1830, to Bkerké. Today, Maronite Patriarchs use Dimane as a summer residence and Bkerké as a winter one.

The monastery was renovated in 1970 by Patriarch Paul Peter Meouchi. Patriarch Anthony Peter Khoraish added the external gate in 1982, and in 1995 Patriarch Nasrallah Boutros Sfeir built a new wing to house the archives and serve as a museum. He also established tombs for the patriarchs and decorated the church with ornate windows.

An old book references a convent, called Kourket, that was likely in this same area, if not on the same site. According to these (likely sensationalized) stories, the convent, founded around 1755, had high death rates, blamed on the air of the region. In 1775, a traveler, who spent the night outside the convent walls, observes a body being secretively buried and tells the local ruler. He sends a contingent of horsemen to gain access to the convent, where they discover "abominations which make the hair stand on end". The founder of the convent, Hendia, had "destroyed her nuns, sometimes to get their property into her hands, at other times, because they showed themselves refractory to her orders...". After this discovery, she was jailed and escaped from multiple convents.

== Bibliography ==
- Bakhit, Muhammad Adnan Salamah (February 1972). The Ottoman Province of Damascus in the Sixteenth Century (PhD). School of Oriental and African Studies, University of London.
