= Antonios Boutros Arida =

Head of the Maronite Church from 1932 to 1955

His Beatitude Antonios II Boutros Arida أنطونيوس الثاني بطرس عريضة
- Patriarch of Antioch
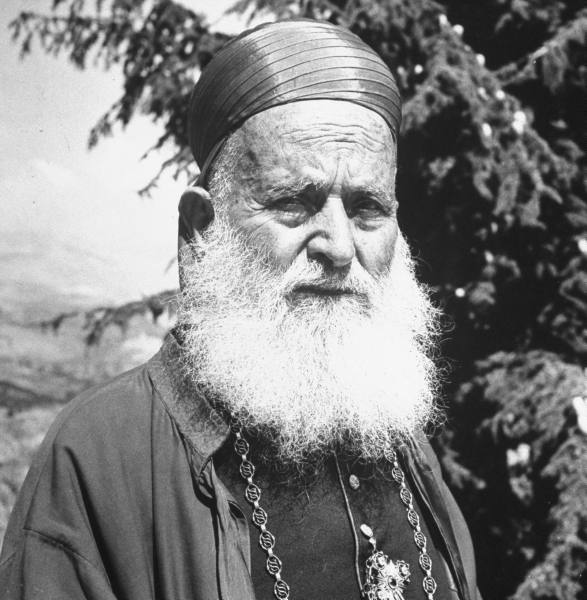
- Church: Maronite Church
- See: Patriarch of Antioch
- Elected: January 8, 1932
- Term ended: May 19, 1955
- Predecessor: Elias Peter Hoayek
- Successor: Cardinal Paul Peter Meouchi

Orders
- Ordination: September 28, 1890 (Priest)
- Consecration: June 7, 1908 (Bishop) by Elias Peter Hoayek

Personal details
- Born: August 2, 1863 Bsharri, Mount Lebanon Mutasarrifate, Ottoman Empire
- Died: May 19, 1955 (aged 91) Dimane, Lebanon

Antonios II Boutros Arida (August 2, 1863 – May 19, 1955) (or Selim Ben Abdel Ahad Arida, Antoine Boutros Arida, Arabic: أنطونيوس الثاني بطرس عريضة, romanized: ʾAnṭūniyūs ath-Thānī Būtrus ʿArīḍah) was the 73rd Maronite Patriarch of Antioch from 1932 until his death in 1955. He was previously Archeparch of Tripoli.

== Life ==
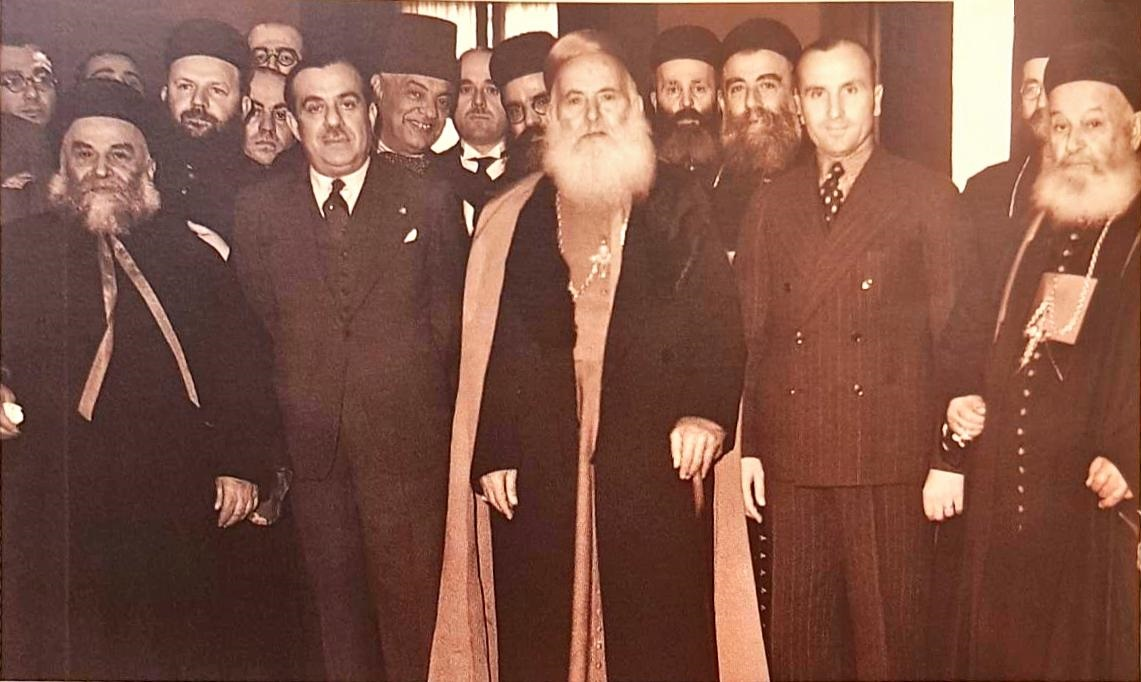
Antoine Boutros Arida heading a delegation of Maronite bishops, visiting President Émile Eddé and prime minister Abdallah Al-Yafi.

Antonios Boutros Arida was born Selim Ben Abdel Ahad Arida in Bkerkasha, Lebanon on February 2, 1863. He learned Arabic and Syriac as a schoolboy. From 1884 to 1890 he studied theology at the school of Saint-Sulpice, Paris.

He was ordained a priest on September 28, 1890, and served as secretary and canon lawyer for the Maronite Patriarch John Peter El Hajj.

Arida was appointed honorary prelate by Pope Pius X on July 31, 1905; appointed Maronite bishop of Tripoli, Lebanon on June 7, 1908; consecrated bishop on June 18, 1908, by Maronite Patriarch of Antioch, Elias Peter Hoayek; and installed in his episcopal see on June 28 of the same year.

On January 8, 1932, Anthony Peter Arida was elected Maronite Patriarch of Antioch and all the East, the primate of the Maronite Church. The Holy See confirmed him patriarch on March 13, 1933.

Arida, like his predecessor Elias Peter Hoayek played a key role in the formation of modern Lebanon in order to maintain the specificity of Lebanon as a Christian nation in the Muslim world, culminating in the nation's independence in 1943.

Selim had two brothers Joseph Arida and Richard Arida. They immigrated to Argentina and then to Australia where they settled in Charters Towers and became successful businessmen. When World War I broke out Joseph Arida and his wife Adma Rahme were at Mount Lebanon, and were interned by the Turks. Joseph bribed his way out of prison and escaped to the mountains; there he together with his brother, the Maronite bishop of Tripoli, Lebanon at the time, became known for their charity during the famine that followed the Turkish blockade.

Patriarch Arida openly condemned the treatment of Jews in Germany in 1933. He addressed an encyclical calling on Maronites throughout the world to dedicate their Sunday prayers and homilies to the Jews of the world. He explained that Hitler's Germany had distorted Christian teachings: "We ought never forget that the Jews are our brothers in humanity, and that Almighty God has chosen them, and no one else, as keepers of His Divine Oneness and His Eternal Truth." The message was in line with a series of memoranda that the patriarch had begun dispatching to various Lebanese, French, and Jewish organisations, beginning in May 1933.

Near the end of his life the Holy See appointed an apostolic committee to assist in the management and administration of the Patriarchate. The committee consisted of three bishops, including his successor, Paul Peter Meouchi.

Anthony Peter Arida died on Holy Thursday, May 19, 1955, in the Maronite Catholic Patriarchate in Bkerké, Lebanon. His last words before his death were "God protect Lebanon".

== See also ==
- List of Maronite Patriarchs
- Maronite Church
