= Chucrallah Harb =

Lebanese Maronite Bishop

- Bishop of the Eparchy of Jounieh (Maronite)
- Church: Maronite Church
- See: Eparchy of Jounieh (Maronite)
- In office: 1977 – 1999
- Predecessor: none
- Successor: Antoine Nabil Andari
- Previous post(s): Prelate

Orders
- Ordination: June 19, 1949

Personal details
- Born: May 5, 1923; Tannourine, Lebanon
- Died: 31 December 2019 (aged 96)

Chucrallah Boutros Harb (May 5, 1923 – December 31, 2019) was a Lebanese Hierarch of Maronite Church and an eparch of the Maronite Catholic Eparchy of Baalbek and Maronite Catholic Eparchy of Jounieh.

== Biography ==
Harb was born in Tannourine, Lebanon, and was ordained a priest on June 19, 1949. He was appointed bishop to the Eparchy of Baalbek-Deir El-Ahmar on March 15, 1967, by Pope Paul VI and ordained bishop on May 14, 1967, by Maronite Patriarch of Antioch, Paul Peter Meouchi. His co-consecrators were Elie Farah, Archeparch of Cyprus and Joseph Khoury, Archeparch of Tyre. Harb was appointed bishop of the Eparchy of Jounieh on August 4, 1977, and held this position until his retirement on June 5, 1999.
