= Kreimists =

Lebanese religious institute of the Maronite Church

- Congregation of the Maronite Lebanese Missionaries
- Arabic: جمعية المرسلين اللبنانيين الموارنة
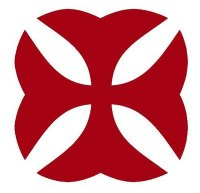
- Abbreviation: LM
- Formation: 8 May 1865 (161 years ago)
- Founder: Youhanna Habib
- Type: Religious institute
- Headquarters: Monastery of Saint John the Beloved, Jounieh, Lebanon
- Location: Jounieh, Lebanon
- Members: 120
- Superior General: Maroun Moubarak, LM
- Vicar General: Khalil Alwan, LM
- Counselors General: Maroun Moussa, LM; Nadim Helou, LM; George Ters
- Parent organization: Maronite Patriarchate
- Website: lebanesemissionaries.org

The Kreimists, known formally as the Congregation of the Maronite Lebanese Missionaries (Arabic: جمعية المرسلين اللبنانيين الموارنة; abbreviated LM), is a religious institute of the Maronite Church founded at the monastery of Kreim – Ghosta (Mountain of Lebanon) in 1865 by Youhanna Habib, who would later become Archbishop of Nazareth.

== History ==
An earlier community was founded there in 1840 but died out.

== Missionary locations and work ==
The Congregation of the Maronite Lebanese Missionaries exists today in Lebanon and around the world where the Maronites are present. Current mission locations include:

=== Lebanon ===
- Monastery of the Holy Savior in Kreim – Ghosta, the Mother House.
- Monastery of Our Lady of Deliverance, Mayrouba.
- Monastery of St. John the Beloved, Jounieh.
- Shrine of Our Lady of Lebanon, administration and pastoral service since 1908.
- Apostles College in Jounieh – School from Elementary to High School grades.
- Maronite Orphanage and Cadmus College in Tyre – School from elementary to high school grades.
- Major Seminary of St. John The Beloved.

In addition, there is an orphanage and school under construction in Edde, Batroun. There is a printing press used for liturgical and religious publications among them those of the Patriarch and others. Amongst these is the publication of Al Manarat (The Lighthouse), which is a magazine discussing religious topics in depth. There is an associated radio station called "The Voice of Charity" which began broadcasting in 1984. There is a TV channel "TV Charity" founded in 2009 the channel based in Keserwan that serves as an apostolate of the Lebanese Maronite Missionaries. Main show topics include theology, bioethics, education, social issues, daily Church news, and intercultural exchange. Charity TV also offers shows for entertainment and special programs for children and teens. A particular tradition is that one of the Congregation fathers gives an annual retreat for the Patriarch and Bishops.

=== Abroad ===
- Buenos Aires, Argentina: The mission was established in 1901; it includes a parish, a school, a printing press and the publishing of their own journal in Arabic and Spanish.
- In 1931 a mission was set up in Rio de Janeiro, Brazil and it includes a parish and pastoral center.
- In 1931 a mission, the Parish and Pastoral Center, was set up in Johannesburg, South Africa, in 1991 another church was founded in response to the growing community.
- In 1993, a mission started in Sydney, Australia where the priests help in the pastoral work of the Eparchy and the "Voice of Charity".
- In 2012 a mission, the Pastoral Work Mission, was started in Bethlehem, South Africa, as the Benefice of the Church.
- 12 priests are helping with parochial work in the U.S.A.

== General Superiors of the Congregation ==
- Father Khalil Alwan, 2001-2007
- Father Elie Madi, 2007-2013
- Father Malek Abou Tanous 2013 - 2019
