= Paul Peter Meouchi =

Head of the Maronite Church from 1955 to 1975

His Beatitude Moran Mor Paul Peter Meouchi بولس الثاني بطرس المعوشي
- Cardinal, Patriarch of Antioch
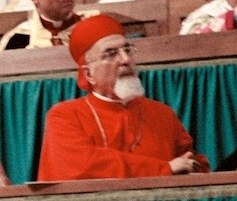
- Church: Maronite Church
- See: Patriarch of Antioch
- Elected: May 25, 1955
- Term ended: January 11, 1975
- Predecessor: Anthony Peter Arida
- Successor: Anthony Peter Khoraish

Orders
- Ordination: December 7, 1917 (Priest)
- Consecration: December 8, 1934 (Bishop) by Anthony Peter Arida
- Created cardinal: February 22, 1965 by Pope Paul VI
- Rank: Patriarch (Cardinal-Bishop)

Personal details
- Born: April 1, 1894 Jezzine, Vilayet of Beirut, Ottoman Empire
- Died: January 11, 1975 (aged 80) Bkerké, Lebanon

Moran Mor Paul II Peter Meouchi (born April 1, 1894, Jezzine, Lebanon – died on January 11, 1975, Bkerké, Lebanon), (or Boulos Boutros el-Meouchi, Meoushi, Arabic: بولس الثاني بطرس المعوشي) was the 74th Maronite Patriarch of Antioch from 1955 until his death in 1975. He was made a cardinal in 1965.

== Life ==
Moran Mor Paul Peter Meouchi was born in Jezzine, Lebanon on April 1, 1894. Bechara El Khoury was his second cousin. He studied at the College de la Sagesse in Ashrafieh, a district of Beirut and later in Rome in the Pontifical Urban University and at the Pontifical Gregorian University.

He was ordinated priest in Rome on December 7, 1917, and served as secretary of the Maronite bishops of Saida and of Tyre. After having attended a visitation of the bishop of Tyre in the United States in 1920, he remained in the United States until 1934 by serving the Maronite communities particularly in Indiana, Connecticut and California.

He was elected Maronite bishop of Tyre on April 29, 1934, and consecrated on December 8, 1934, at Bkerké by Maronite Patriarch of Antioch, Anthony Peter Arida. His co-consecrators were Augustin Bostani, Eparch of Sidon, and Pierre Feghali, Titular bishop of Epiphania in Syria. He chose as episcopal motto Gloria Libani data est ei.

Moran Mor Paul Peter Meouchi was elected patriarch of Antioch of the Maronites on May 25, 1955. He attended the first, second and third sessions of the Second Vatican Council (1962–1965), where he took a stand to defend the rights of patriarchs to discourage the emigration of Christians from the Middle East. On February 22, 1965, he was created Cardinal by Pope Paul VI, being the first Maronite to become cardinal. He was elevated - as usual of Eastern Catholic Patriarchs, as a result of the motu proprio Ad purpuratorum patrum collegium - to the rank of cardinal-bishop without granting a suburbicarian diocese.

Meouchi was from 1969 to his death the chairman of the Synod of the Maronite Church and from 1970 to his death the chairman of the Assembly of Catholic Patriarchs and Bishops in Lebanon.

From a political point of view, his action as Patriarch of the Maronite was intended to promote reconciliation among all Lebanese, both Christians and Muslims. A supporter of Arab nationalism, he thus stood in opposition to the pro-American former president of Lebanon Camille Chamoun. Meouchi had also good relations with the Druze and was a personal friend and advisor of Nazira Jumblatt, the mother of Kamal Jumblatt.

He died on January 11, 1975, in the Maronite Catholic Patriarchate in Bkerké, Lebanon, where he was buried.

== See also ==
- List of Maronite Patriarchs
- Maronite Church

== Sources ==
- Code, Joseph Bernard (1964). Dictionary of the American Hierarchy (1789-1964). New York: Joseph F. Wagner. pp. 200–201.
