= Bechara Boutros al-Rahi =

Head of the Maronite Church since 2011

His Beatitude Moran Mor Bechara Boutros al-Ra'i OMM
- Patriarch of Antioch
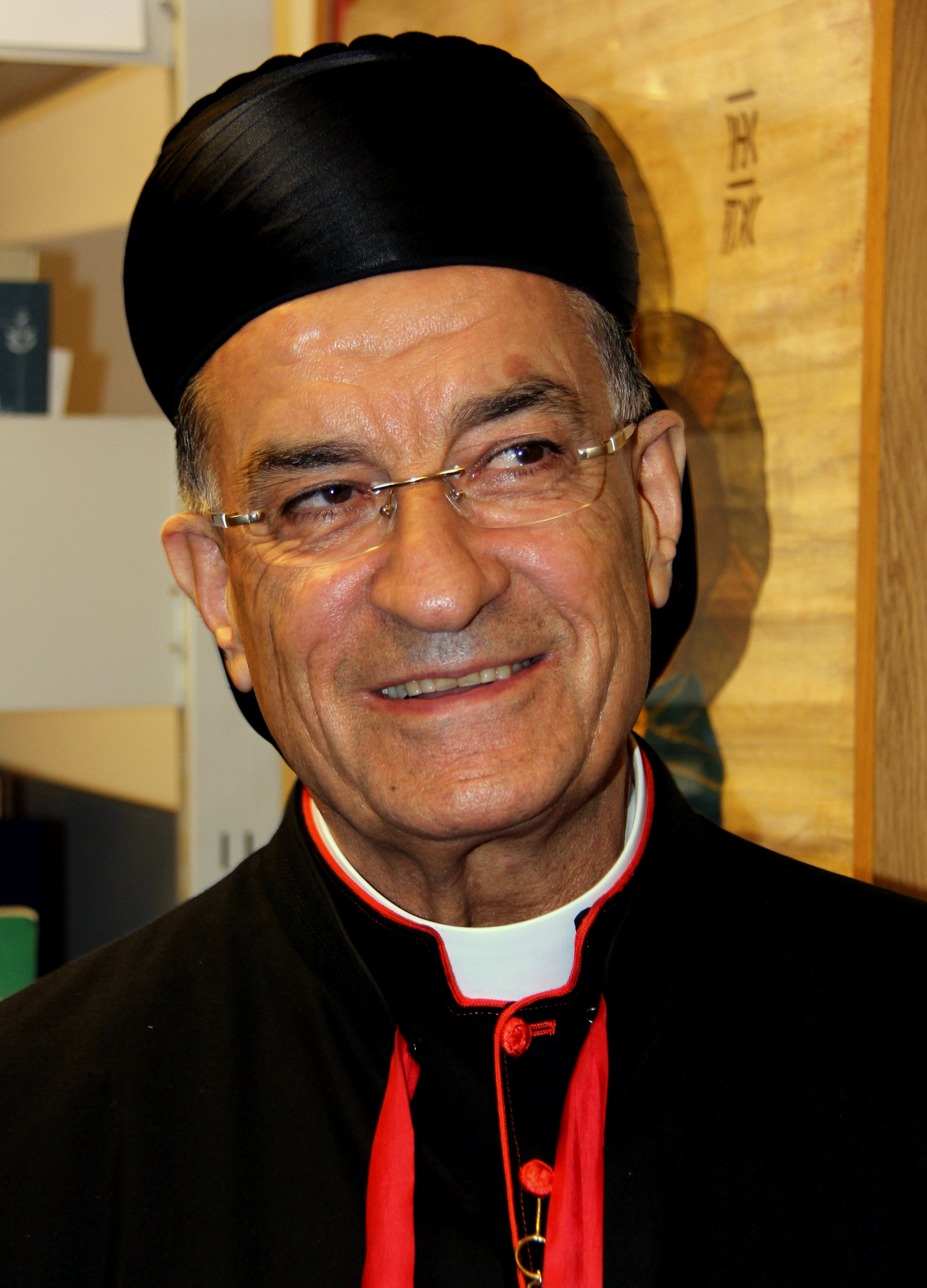
- Al-Ra'i in 2013
- Church: Maronite Church
- See: Antioch and All the East
- Appointed: 15 March 2011
- Installed: 25 March 2011
- Predecessor: Nasrallah Boutros Sfeir
- Previous posts: Auxiliary Bishop of Antioch (1986–1990); Titular Bishop of Caesarea Philippi (1986–1990); Eparch of Byblos (1990–2011)

Orders
- Ordination: 3 September 1967
- Consecration: 12 July 1986 by Nasrallah Boutros Sfeir
- Created cardinal: 24 November 2012 by Pope Benedict XVI
- Rank: Patriarch (Cardinal Bishop)

Personal details
- Born: 25 February 1940 (age 86) Hemlaya, Lebanon
- Denomination: Catholic Church

Bechara Boutros Al-Ra'i OMM (or Raï; Arabic: بِشَارَة بُطرُس الرَّاعِيّ, romanized: Mor Bishāre Buṭrus er-Rāʿī; Syriac: ܡܪܢ ܡܪܝ ܒܫܐܪܐ ܦܛܪܘܣ ܐܠܪܐܥܝ; Latin: Béchara Petrus Raï) (born 25 February 1940) is the 77th Maronite Patriarch of Antioch, and head of the Maronite Church, a position he has held since 15 March 2011, succeeding Patriarch Nasrallah Boutros Sfeir. Rahi was made a cardinal on 24 November 2012 by Pope Benedict XVI. He is a member of the Mariamite Maronite Order.

== Early life and education ==
Mar Bechara Boutros Al-Ra'i was born in Hemlaya, Matn District, Lebanon on 25 February 1940. He attended Collège Notre Dame de Jamhour, a Jesuit school in Lebanon. He entered the Mariamite Maronite Order on 31 July 1962, and was ordained as a priest on 3 September 1967.

From 1967 to 1975 he was responsible for the Arabic programs of Vatican Radio. During this time, he also served as Assistant Rector of the Collegio Maronita di Roma (Archbishop Pietro Sfair was the Rector). In 1975, he received a PhD in canon and civil law. He also studied for three years at Pontifical Lateran University in Rome.

== Episcopacy ==
He was appointed titular bishop of Caesarea Philippi on 2 May 1986 and consecrated as Auxiliary Bishop of Antioch on 12 July 1986, by Patriarch Nasrallah Boutros Sfeir and his co-consecrators Roland Aboujaoudé, Auxiliary Bishop of Antioch; Georges Abi-Saber, titular bishop of Aradus; Chucrallah Harb, Eparch of Joubbé, Sarba and Jounieh; Joseph Mohsen Béchara, Archeparch of Cyprus; Khalil Abi-Nader, Archeparch of Beirut; Ignace Ziadé, Emeritus Archeparch of Beirut; Antoine Joubeir, Archeparch of Tripoli; Elie Farah, Emeritus Archeparch of Cyprus; Joseph Merhi, Eparch of Cairo; and Ibrahim Hélou, Eparch of Sidon.

On 9 June 1990, he was elected Bishop of Byblos. In 2003 he was elected Secretary of the Maronite Synod. In 2009 he was appointed President of the Lebanese Episcopal Commission for the Media.

=== Maronite Patriarch ===
At 71, Al-Ra'i was elected patriarch of the Maronites on 15 March 2011, after getting more than two-thirds of the votes of the 39 bishops and replacing Nasrallah Sfeir. He formally requested and received ecclesiastical communion from Pope Benedict XVI on 24 March 2011 pursuant to Canon 76 § 2 of the Code of Canons of the Eastern Churches. The Mass for the inauguration of his Patriarchate took place on 25 March 2011, in Bkerké, the see of the Maronite Catholic Patriarchate. As is customary for all Maronite Patriarchs, Patriarch Al-Ra'i took the additional name Boutros, that of Saint Peter, who briefly held the See of Antioch before moving to Rome to become Bishop there. On 7 March 2012, Al-Ra'i was appointed a member of the Congregation for the Oriental Churches.

Al-Ra'i was made a cardinal by Pope Benedict XVI in a consistory on 24 November 2012. Al-Ra'i was the fourth Maronite Patriarch created cardinal, the first three being his three immediate predecessors Paul Peter Meouchi, Anthony Peter Khoraish, and Nasrallah Sfeir.

On 31 January 2013, Al-Ra'i was appointed by Pope Benedict XVI to serve as a member of the Congregation for the Oriental Churches, the Supreme Tribunal of the Apostolic Signatura, the Pontifical Council for the Pastoral Care of Migrants and Itinerants, and the Pontifical Council for Social Communications.

In February 2013, following the resignation of Pope Benedict XVI, Al-Ra'i participated as a cardinal elector in the conclave that elected Pope Francis. Cardinal Al-Ra'i was one of four cardinal-electors from outside the Latin Church who wore distinct vestments proper to their respective churches. The other three cardinal-electors from outside the Latin Church were Coptic Catholic Patriarch-Emeritus Antonios Naguib, Syro Malabar Major Archbishop George Alencherry, and Syro-Malankara Major Archbishop Baselios Cleemis. Cardinal Al-Ra'i's attire during the opening day was distinct from most of the other electors in that he wore all-red vestments with distinct headgear proper to the Maronite Church. (Note: A tabieh (طابية) and an escime (إسكيم).) Cardinal Al-Ra'i is also the first Maronite Cardinal Patriarch ever to participate in a papal conclave. (Note: The first two Maronite Cardinals Paul Peter Meouchi (made cardinal by Pope Paul VI) and Anthony Peter Khoraish (created cardinal by Pope John Paul II) turned 80 and died before having an opportunity to participate in a conclave and the third Maronite Patriarch to become a cardinal, Nasrallah Boutros Sfeir was over the age of 80 during the 2005 sede vacante and thus did not take part in that year's conclave nor in the 2013 conclave.)

He was named a member of the Congregation for Catholic Education by Pope Francis on 30 November 2013.

On 18 March 2015, Al-Ra'i became the sole cardinal-elector from the order of cardinal-bishops when Cardinal Naguib turned 80. He remained the sole cardinal-bishop elector until 28 June 2018 when four Latin church cardinals of voting age from the priestly and diaconal orders were elevated by Pope Francis to cardinal-bishop by having their titular churches co-opted to suburbicarian rank and Louis Raphaël I Sako, Patriarch of the Chaldean Catholic Church was created a cardinal-patriarch. Cardinal Al-Ra'i ceased to be a cardinal-elector on his 80th birthday in 2020.

== Political views ==
In April 2011, Al-Ra'i said that, for the sake of communion and love, he would work "to establish a sincere and complete dialogue" with Muslims "and build together a future in common life and cooperation." He said his predecessor "struggled with insistence to free both the national decision-making and the land of Lebanon from all forms of tutelage and occupation, worked for reconciliation in Mount Lebanon and realized needed church reforms. All of these constitute an extension of the church's springtime started by the Second Vatican Council." Al-Ra'i does not use the term "Arab Spring", but "Arab Winter" to express his unenthusiastic reaction.

=== Hezbollah ===
==== 2010s ====
In September 2011, some of the Christian supporters of the March 14 alliance were upset over his controversial comments in Paris, France where he supported Hezbollah's right to hold arms in defense against Israel, and stated that the 2011 Syrian protests could awaken the rise of the Muslim Brotherhood if President Bashar al-Assad was removed from office. 14 March supporters stressed how his predecessor had very different views and was almost fanatically supportive of the Lebanese Forces. Prime Minister Najib Mikati said: "The Maronite patriarch spoke about a part [of the problem]. No one is against the resistance's arms as long as Israeli occupation continues." President Michel Suleiman said that "the Patriarch is not in need of anyone to defend him and his positions emanate from his central role as a person in charge of Lebanon's and the Middle East's Christians and that of Lebanon's independence and sovereignty;" and that "his stances represent his way of taking responsibility for Lebanon's Christians."

Parliament speaker Nabih Berri said that Al-Ra'i's "comments in Paris protect Lebanon from danger and I agree with what he stated and affirm his vision that is rooted in both a religious and national background" and that "If the situation further deteriorated in Syria and we reached a more radical rule than the current rule, like the rule of the Muslim Brotherhood, Christians there would pay the price, either in the form of killings or displacement. Here is the picture of Iraq in front of us." Free Patriotic Movement leader Michel Aoun expressed support for Al-Ra'i: "Rai's statements express the concerns of the minorities because he is entrusted with the Synod for the Middle East. Gradual changes doesn't harm stability and wouldn't get Syria into the [same] troubles as Palestine, Iraq, Libya and Yemen. [As some of the Syrian demonstrators are armed and are destroying the country] the Syrian government cannot but bring order to the country."

Former 14 March Progressive Socialist Party leader Walid Jumblatt criticised Al-Ra'i's assessment on the grounds that "Lebanon cannot remain hostage to regional conflicts", and denied that regime change in Syria was posing a threat to Christians in the country.

In an interview with Reuters on 4 March 2012, Al-Ra'i said: "All regimes in the Arab world have Islam as a state religion, except for Syria. It stands out for not saying it is an Islamic state... The closest thing to democracy [in the Arab world] is Syria."

In the fall of 2014, Al-Ra'i declared the security necessity of having Hezbollah: "If not for Hezbollah, ISIS would have marched all the way to the (coastal and Christian) town of Jounieh."

According to Alexander D. M. Henley from Oxford University's Faculty of Theology and Religion, Al-Ra'i caused stirs in May 2016 by moving closer to the Resistance and "staging dialogues with Hezbollah, alienating in the process many of his predecessor's staunchest supporters and allies."

==== 2020s ====
In April 2021, Al-Ra'i said: "Hezbollah shouldn’t remain free in using arms whenever and wherever he wants ... it’s very well known that Hezbollah (is) an Iranian military force in Lebanon to combat Israel. Why should they combat Israel from Lebanon, if you want to fight Israel why do you want to use the Lebanese territory?"

In August 2021, Al-Ra'i said that the launching by Hezbollah of rockets from Lebanon was an attempt by Hezbollah to divert peoples' attention from the memory of the Beirut port explosion, and called on the Lebanese Army to prevent rocket fire from Lebanese territory and so as to prevent the exhausted Lebanese people from being subjected to further destruction.

On 2 January 2023, Al-Ra'i met with a delegation from Hezbollah in Bkerké. Despite the sometimes fraught relationship and arguments over Lebanon's neutrality, Ibrahim Amin Al-Sayyed, the chairman of the Political Council of Hezbollah, stated in an apparent warming of relations that Hezbollah "is always open with him." After this meeting it was declared by Al-Sayyed that Hezbollah had ended the impasse with Al-Ra'i. Al-Ra'i in April 2023 was also visited by Hezbollah's candidate for Lebanon's presidency, Suleiman Franjieh, who hailed the talks. The visit occurred after Hezbollah pledged to back his candidacy.

In December 2023, al-Rahi called publicly for Hezbollah to disarm and withdraw from the Lebanese border with Israel "for the sake of everyone's welfare," as was required by U.N. Security Council Resolution 1701 which had been adopted in 2006. He added: "We demand the removal of any rocket launcher planted between homes in southern towns that would require a devastating Israeli response."

In January 2024, commenting on Hezbollah in his Sunday sermon, Al-Ra'i said: "Allow me to say it loud and clear... I refuse to make myself and my family members hostages, human shields, and sacrificial lambs for failed Lebanese policies, and for the culture of death that has brought nothing but imaginary victories and shameful defeats to our country... The people of the border villages in the south ... are living through the brunt of the war imposed on them and rejected by them, as they consider that Lebanon and the Lebanese have nothing to do with it."

In June 2024, al-Rahi described Hezbollah's operations in south Lebanon against Israel as "terrorist."

=== Visit to Israel and the Holy Land ===
On 26 May 2014, Al-Ra'i joined Pope Francis on parts of the pontifical three-day Holy Land pilgrimage, and thereafter he stayed three days longer. He thereby became the first Lebanese religious leader to visit Israel since its creation in 1948. Al-Ra'i arrived late Sunday in Jerusalem after accompanying Francis in the West Bank, but he departed from the parts of the pope's itinerary that involved meetings with Israeli officials. After visiting a monastery outside the city on his way to Jaffa, Israel, and being cheered there, Al-Ra'i joined the Pope again in the afternoon for Mass at Jerusalem's Cenacle. Al-Ra'i then returned to the West Bank for a visit to Beit Sahour, toured the north, the Galilee region, Nazareth, Acre and Haifa, where many of the country's Arab Christian minority live.

The visit was criticized by Hezbollah and some others at home. The patriarch maintained that he was misunderstood, and that his journey was celebrating the roots of Christianity in the region.

=== Visit to Saudi Arabia ===
In November 2017, Al-Ra'i visited Saudi Arabia to meet King Salman, becoming the first Maronite Patriarch to visit the kingdom.

=== Calls for international conference, democracy, and neutrality ===
On 27 February 2021, Al-Ra'i addressed in a rally the political and economic crisis in Lebanon, in which he said:

Also do not remain silent about the failure of the political class, nor about the chaos of the investigation into the port crime, nor about the politicization of the judiciary, nor about illegal and non-Lebanese weapons, nor about the coup against the state and the regime.

He also called for an international conference to solve Lebanese issues:

We want the international conference to renew support for the democratic system that expresses the Lebanese's adherence to freedom, justice and equality, and we want it to declare "Lebanon's neutrality" so that it will no longer be a victim of conflicts and wars and a land of divisions.

He repeated this call in 2022, during a conversation with Thomas Heine-Geldern, head of Aid to the Church in Need. "We are calling for a special international conference for Lebanon under the purview of the UN. We must also settle the issue of Palestinian and Syrian refugees. Finally, we must declare the positive neutrality of Lebanon. Without this, there is no solution. These are the conditions for the 'message country', as it was called by Pope John Paul II, to continue to bear its witness."

=== Domestic politics ===
Given the sectarian nature of Lebanese politics, the head of the Maronite Church is generally cautious about making statements of a political nature, but has been known to criticise the domestic political scene, as he did in a 2022 interview with Aid to the Church in Need, saying:

The Lebanese population is not what it once was. The Lebanese used to live with dignity, they were not dependent on anybody. The fact is that our politicians made the population poor, beggars. We are haemorrhaging people. Every day we lose thousands of our best engineers, our best doctors, our best teachers, because the loss of value of the Lebanese pound to the dollar destroyed the value of salaries.

=== Refugees ===
The Patriarch has commended the generosity of the Lebanese for welcoming refugees since as far back as 1948, but warned that this cannot continue without help. "Our population never closed its borders. In 1948 we welcomed the Palestinian refugees. At the time our patriarch sent a letter to all the convents, schools and universities that belonged to the Maronite Church, to open their doors to them, because they were our brothers in need. They are still around half a million. We have a further 1.5 million Syrian refugees, as well, so we are looking after two million refugees. The International Community congratulates us, and tells us we are hospitable. But we don't need to be told that we are hospitable. We can't manage anymore."

=== Migration of Christians ===
Regarding the exodus of Christians from Arab countries, the Patriarch told Aid to the Church in Need that the international community must "change its perspective", but that there is a risk of a drop in the Christian population leading to a rise of fundamentalist Islam. "This migration is reducing the number of Christians, who in the Middle East have contributed to the formation of a moderate Islam. If the Middle East is emptied of Christians, Muslims will lose their moderation."

"Many Christians and Muslims have also had to emigrate, because the lack of peace and security, and the economic and financial situation affects everyone. The positive side of this is that they can restart their lives, carrying their faith with them around the world. But the negative is that Lebanon is being emptied of Christians. States have to change their perspective. It’s not about focusing on the number of Christians, but on the value that the presence of the Christians adds".

== Distinctions ==
- Lebanon: National Order of the Cedar by the President of Lebanon, Michel Suleiman (2012)
- France: Grand Cross of the Legion of Honor by the President of France, Nicolas Sarkozy (2011)

== Gallery ==
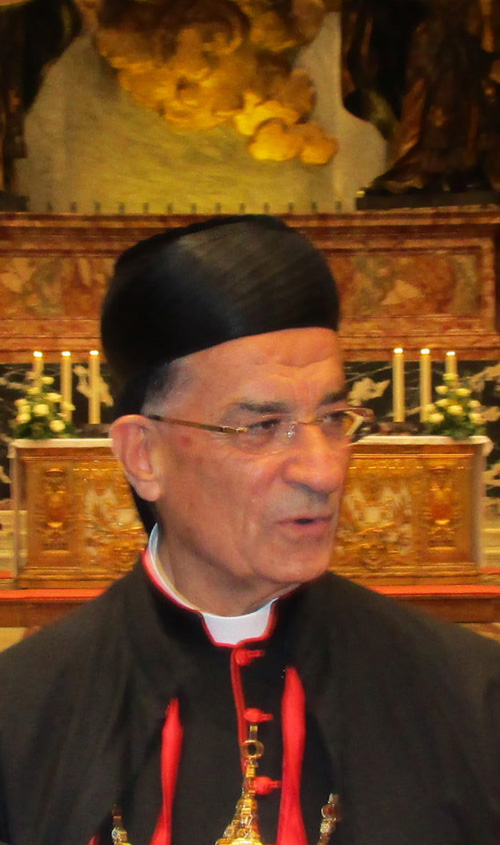
Raï at the Chair of Saint Peter, 11 October 2014

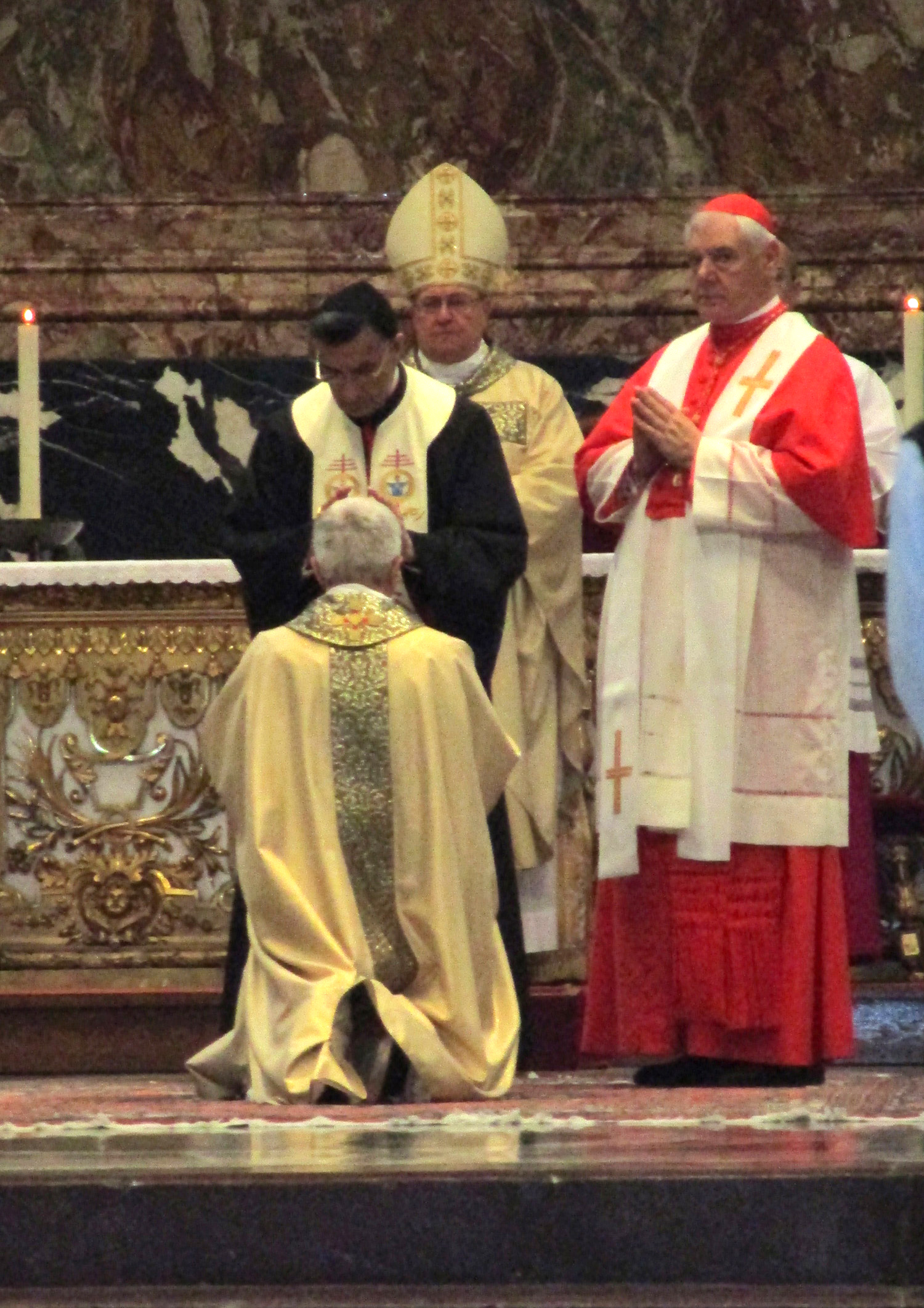
Rahi lays on his hands on Maurizio Malvestiti during his episcopal ordination as Cardinals Sandri and Müller observe, 11 October 2014

== See also ==
- Cardinals created by Pope Benedict XVI
- List of Maronite Patriarchs
- Maronite Church

== Notes ==
Catholic Church titles
Preceded by Nasrallah Boutros Sfeir	Maronite Patriarch of Antioch; 2011–present	Incumbent
