= Elie Farah =

Lebanese archbishop and priest (1909–2003)

Elie Farah (27 December 1909 – 22 July 2003) was Archbishop of the Maronite Catholic Archeparchy of Cyprus from 1954 to 1986.

== Early life ==
He was born in Kafar Berhem, Lebanon. He was educated at the Jesuit-run Oriental Seminary of St. Francis Xavier, part of the Saint Joseph University of Beirut.

Farah was ordained to the priesthood on April 9, 1935.

From 1939 to 1954, he served as pastor of the Maronite parish in Alexandria, Egypt.

== Episcopacy ==
On 16 April 1954 he was appointed by Pope Pius XII Archbishop of the Maronite Archeparchy of Cyprus with headquarters in Nicosia. His episcopal ordination occurred on September 26, 1954, by the former Archbishop of Tyre and future Patriarch of Antioch of the Maronites Paul Peter Meouchi on 26 September 1954 and his co-consecrators were Eparch of Cairo Pietro Dib and the Archeparch of Beirut Ignace Ziadé. Farah attended the sessions one, three and four of the Second Vatican Council.

Pope Paul VI appointed him to the Pontifical Commission for Communications Media in 1969.

On 4 April 1986, his age-related resignation was accepted by Pope John Paul II.

Farah died on 22 July 2003.

== See also ==
- Catholic Church in Cyprus
