= Nasrallah Boutros Sfeir =

Head of the Maronite Church from 1986 to 2011

His Beatitude Moran Mor Nasrallah Boutros Sfeir
- Cardinal, Patriarch of Antioch
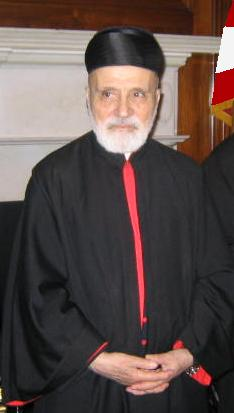
- Native name: Arabic: نصرالله بطرس صفير
- See: Antioch and the Whole East
- Elected: 19 April 1986
- Appointed: 7 May 1986
- Term ended: 26 February 2011
- Predecessor: Anthony Peter Khoraish
- Successor: Bechara Boutros al-Rahi
- Previous posts: Auxiliary Bishop of Antioch (1961–1986); Titular Bishop of Tarsus of the Maronites (1961–1986)

Orders
- Ordination: 7 May 1950
- Consecration: 16 July 1961 by Paul Peter Meouchi
- Created cardinal: 26 November 1994 by Pope John Paul II
- Rank: Patriarch (Cardinal-bishop)

Personal details
- Born: 15 May 1920 Rayfoun, Lebanon
- Died: 12 May 2019 (aged 98) Achrafieh, Beirut, Lebanon
- Coat of arms

Nasrallah Boutros Sfeir (Moran Mor Naṣrallah Buṭrus Ṣufayr; Arabic: الكاردينال مار نصر الله بطرس صفير; Latin: Victor Petrus Sfeir; 15 May 1920 – 12 May 2019) was the 76th Maronite Catholic Patriarch of Antioch and the Whole Levant and head of the Maronite Church from 1986 to 2011. He was made a cardinal by Pope John Paul II in 1994.

== Early life and ordination ==
Nasrallah Sfeir was born in Rayfoun, Lebanon, on 15 May 1920. He was educated in Beirut, and at Mar Abda School in Harharaya where he completed his primary and complementary studies, and Ghazir where he completed his secondary studies at St. Maron Seminary. He graduated in philosophy and theology in 1950 at Saint Joseph's University in Beirut. He was ordained to the priesthood in the same year on 7 May. From 1951 to 1955 he served as priest to the parish of Rayfoun.

In 1956, he was appointed the secretary of the Maronite Patriarchate, based in Bkerké. In the same year, he became professor of translation in literature and philosophy at the Frères Maristes (Marist Brothers) School in Jounieh. On 23 June 1961 Sfeir was appointed Titular bishop and Patriarchal vicar. On 16 July 1961, he was consecrated the titular bishop of Tarsus by Patriarch Paul Peter Meouchi and had as his co-consecrators João Chedid, titular bishop of Arca in Phoenicia dei Maroniti, and Michael Doumith, Eparch of Sarba. Consequently, Sfeir served as patriarchal vicar.

== Patriarch ==
He was elected to the primacy of the Maronite Church by the Council of Maronite Bishops, on 19 April 1986, and he was confirmed by Pope John Paul II on 7 May 1986.

=== Liturgy ===
Sfeir was keen on accelerating liturgical reforms. This work bore fruit in 1992 with the publication of a new Maronite Missal, which represents an attempt to return to the original form of the Antiochene Liturgy. Its Service of the Word has been described as far more enriched than previous Missals, and it features six Anaphoras (Eucharistic Prayers).

=== Role during the civil war ===
Serving as the Vicar for two previous patriarchs prepared Sfeir for the role in both the ecclesiastical and civil spheres. He became a strong voice for reason and sanity in the latter years of the Lebanese Civil War, which raged from 1975 to 1990. He often spoke out against social and political injustices, and for the poor and disenfranchised. His writings and sermons set out his vision of how Lebanon could achieve a free and prosperous future. Like his predecessor, Sfeir largely stayed out of politics during the first few years of his tenure as patriarch, generally deferring to the stance of the Lebanese President, but by 1989 he had become embroiled in national politics.

=== Resignation ===
Cardinal Sfeir submitted his resignation to the Congregation for the Oriental Churches in Rome in late 2010, but his resignation was not initially accepted because six Maronite bishops had submitted their resignations after reaching the retirement age of 75 in June 2010 His resignation was finally accepted by Pope Benedict XVI on 26 February 2011.

Cardinal Sfeir was succeeded by Bishop Bechara Boutros Rahi who was elected as the new Patriarch for Antioch on 15 March 2011.

== Cardinal ==
Sfeir was made a cardinal by Pope John Paul II in the consistory of 26 November 1994. As the patriarch of a sui juris particular church who has been made a cardinal, Sfeir was a cardinal bishop.

He did not participate in the conclaves of 2005 and 2013, having already reached the age limit of 80.

== Works ==
Sfeir wrote several books, including "The sources of the Gospel-Bkerké", (1975); "Personalities that disappeared 1961–1974", (two volumes); and "Sunday sermons: spiritual reflections and stand of national positions", (several volumes, 1988).

Sfeir was fluent in many languages: Syriac, French, Italian, Aramaic and Latin, as well as Arabic, being proficient in both classical and Lebanese dialects.

== Involvement in politics ==
=== Spring of 1989 ===
On 17 February 1989, two days after General Michel Aoun launched an offensive against Lebanese Forces (LF) positions in East Beirut, in which 70 people were killed, Sfeir convened a meeting of Christian leaders at the seat of the Maronite Church in Bkerké. The conclave backed Aoun's attempt to control the LF, calling for a restoration of state authority and the re-unification of state institutions. Following renewed violence as Aoun's attempted to blockade the militia run seaports South of Beirut a second conclave was held on 19 April, after which 23 Christian members of parliament called for a cease fire. The summer that followed degenerated into almost continuous shelling between Aoun's troops and the Syrians with their allies the PSP. Intense Arab diplomacy led to the Taif agreement and, on 5 November 1989, the Lebanese Parliament elected a new president, Rene Muawad. Sfeir supported the Taif proposals which Aoun rejected. Tens of thousands of people took to the streets in support of Aoun, surrounding him in the Presidential palace in Baabda. About 1,500 of his supporters invaded Bkerké. Sfeir was manhandled and filmed being forced to kiss a photo of Aoun. The following day he moved to the safety of Syrian controlled North Lebanon.

Some sources believe that Sfeir's backing of the Taif accord was the result of pressure from the Vatican whose primary concern was to end the civil war. He is quoted as saying that it would be "a fatal error to believe that we can live alone on an island in which we run our affairs as we like." A few days later, he declared that Aoun's nonacceptance of the Taif Agreement was illegal and unconstitutional. On 5 November Sfeir warned in a sermon that Aoun's stand "would lead to partitioning of the country."Who's who in Lebanon

=== Opposition within the Church ===
The patriarch's authority was challenged even within the Church itself, as several monastic orders issued proclamations supporting Aoun and denouncing the Taif Agreement. To bolster the patriarch's authority, the Vatican became directly involved in reorganizing the Maronite Church. Speaking before a gathering of Lebanese bishops in November 1989, the papal nuncio in Lebanon, Pablo Puente, condemned "the interference of clerical persons and institutions in politics without being officially mandated by the church hierarchy. ...An end must be put to political visits and declarations that have no clear Church mandate." The Vatican later sought to temper nationalist views in the clergy by appointing "visiting bishops" to supervise three especially militant monastic orders. In 1990 Sfeir called for the rival government in West Beirut to take over Aoun's "Christian enclave" in the east. "The legitimate government should spread its authority over the whole nation," he said in one interview. "It should not wait for an invitation from anyone to do so." Finally on 13 October 1990, the Syrian Army crushed Aoun's insurgency and the long civil war finally came to an end. Aoun's main objection to the Taif Agreement was that it had no firm timetable for Syrian withdrawal and that it abolished most of the Maronite president's powers, giving them to the Sunni Prime Minister. The Syrians went on to occupy Lebanon for another 15 years.

=== Cedar Revolution ===
The Syrian invasion was "forced" under international pressure to withdraw its forces from Lebanon, after the political upheaval and large scale street protests which followed the assassination of former Prime Minister Rafik Hariri (see Cedar Revolution); at the end of April 2005, Sfeir was at times a vocal critic of Syrian prevarication in carrying out its pledge to withdraw, up until around 2003, falling silent again just as anti-Syrian views were becoming more widespread. His restraint in his comments at this time appeared to have lost him the support, in particular, of a majority among those Christians who had fled the country. The cardinal also urged restraint in anti-Syrian rhetoric, and for Lebanon to focus on its economic development rather than political rifts. Nevertheless, hundreds of thousands of Lebanese (mostly Christians) gathered in Bkerke and the roads leading to it on 27 March 2001, to welcome back the cardinal from a tour in the United States, during which he asked for the withdrawal of the Syrian army. He blessed in 2001 the establishment of Christian Qornet Shehwan Gathering opposed to the Syrian role and in the aftermath of the Hariri assassination he restated his opposition to Syria's predominant role in Lebanese politics, and the political changes following Syrian withdrawal appeared to have largely restored his previous position as the main spokesperson for his community.

=== Reaction to political paralysis ===
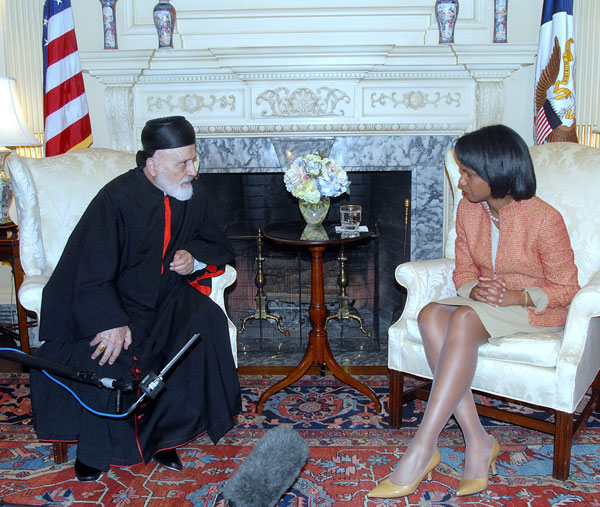
With Condoleezza Rice, US Secretary of State

In the first half of 2006 the cardinal was critical of the political paralysis created by the controversy over whether President Émile Lahoud should serve the remainder of his term of office (which was specially extended under Syrian pressure in 2004 until November 2007). At the same time, he stressed that Lahoud should be removed only by lawful and constitutional means and that the continued smooth functioning of government and a national consensus on his successor were the main priorities. In order to discuss the July 2006 Israel-Lebanon war and American policy on the affair, he met with Vice President Dick Cheney at the White House, and later talked with Secretary of State Condoleezza Rice.

=== Relations with the Free Patriotic Movement ===
On 15 October 2006, the Christian Free Patriotic Movement (FPM) held gatherings in which anti-patriarchal slogans were raised, denouncing Cardinal Sfeir's political stands which they consider contradictory to the will of the FPM Christians in Lebanon. The FPM bloc, led by retired general and former president Michel Aoun, constitutes the largest Christian bloc in the Lebanese parliament. Relations between the cardinal and the FPM and Hezbollah further deteriorated when the patriarch made an eleventh hour appeal directly before the 2009 elections renouncing Hezbollah and the FPM and warning Christians against voting for them. Many believe the stance severely cut Christian support for the 8 March Alliance, especially when Aoun emerged as the biggest loser in the 2009 elections according to some estimates. The FPM blame the cardinal for making them lose 20% of Christian support using religious rhetoric, and for not objecting against the transfer of 15,000 Sunni voters from Beqaa villages to the Christian district of Zahle, which lost the FPM 8 MP's there.

== Death ==
Nasrallah Boutros Sfeir died on 12 May 2019 in the hospital of Hôtel-Dieu de France, Achrafieh district, Beirut, three days before his 99th birthday and was buried at the see of the Maronite Catholic Patriarchate in Bkerké, Lebanon during a state funeral. Upon his death, Pope Francis stated, "A staunch defender of his country's sovereignty and independence, he will remain a great figure in Lebanon's history".

== Arms ==
Coat of arms of His Beatitude Nasrallah Boutros Sfeir

== See also ==
- List of Maronite Patriarchs
- Maronite Church

Catholic Church titles
Preceded by Anthony Khoraiche	Maronite Patriarchs of Antioch; 1986–2011	Succeeded by Bechara Boutros al-Rahi
