= List of cathedrals in Australia =

This is a list of cathedrals in Australia.

A cathedral church is a Christian place of worship which is the principal or "mother" church of a diocese and is distinguished as such by being the location for the cathedra or bishop's seat. In the strictest sense, only those Christian denominations with an episcopal hierarchy possess cathedrals. However, in common use, the term "cathedral" is often used for notable churches which were formerly part of an episcopal denomination.

It is a common misconception that "cathedral" may be applied to any particularly large or grand church. Whilst many cathedrals may be such, this is due to their ecclesiastical status. Such a church is usually grand because it is a cathedral, rather than it being designated a cathedral because of its grandeur. A cathedral may in fact be a relatively small building, particularly in sparser or poorer communities. Modern cathedrals frequently lack the grandeur of those of former times, having more focus on the functional aspects of a place of worship.

Some cathedrals were purpose-built, whilst others were formerly parochial (parish) churches which were subsequently promoted in status due to ecclesiastical requirements such as periodic diocesan reorganisation.

In this list the cathedrals are presented alphabetically by denomination. A list of former and never completed cathedrals is also included.

== Anglican ==
The following Anglican cathedrals are located in Australia:

Cathedral	City	State/Territory	Image	Coordinates
St Peter's Cathedral	Adelaide	South Australia		34°54′46″S 138°35′53″E
St Peter's Cathedral	Armidale	New South Wales		30°30′55″S 151°39′55″E
Cathedral of Christ the King	Ballarat	Victoria		37°33′49″S 143°51′29″E
All Saints' Cathedral	Bathurst	New South Wales		33°25′03″S 149°34′48″E
St Paul's Cathedral	Bendigo	Victoria		36°45′44″S 144°16′58″E
St John's Cathedral	Brisbane	Queensland		27°27′50″S 153°01′48″E
St Boniface's Cathedral	Bunbury	Western Australia		33°19′53″S 115°38′15″E
Christ Church Cathedral	Darwin	Northern Territory		12°27′57″S 130°50′43″E
Cathedral of the Holy Cross	Geraldton	Western Australia		28°46′44″S 114°36′53″E
St Saviour's Cathedral	Goulburn	New South Wales		34°45′11″S 149°42′57″E
Christ Church Cathedral	Grafton	New South Wales		29°41′35″S 152°56′05″E
St David's Cathedral	Hobart	Tasmania		42°53′01″S 147°19′43″E
Christ Church Cathedral	Newcastle	New South Wales		32°55′44″S 151°46′50″E
Cathedral Church of St Alban the Martyr	Griffith	New South Wales		34°17′03″S 146°02′33″E
St Paul's Cathedral	Melbourne	Victoria		37°49′01″S 144°58′03″E
St John the Baptist Cathedral	Murray Bridge	South Australia		35°07′10″S 139°16′22″E
St John's Pro-Cathedral	Parramatta	New South Wales		33°48′57″S 151°00′10″E
St George's Cathedral	Perth	Western Australia		31°57′21″S 115°51′40″E
Ss Peter & Paul's Cathedral	Port Pirie	South Australia		33°10′32″S 138°00′29″E
St Paul's Cathedral	Rockhampton	Queensland		23°22′55″S 150°30′45″E
St Paul's Cathedral	Sale	Victoria		38°06′24″S 147°04′18″E
St Andrew's Cathedral	Sydney	New South Wales		33°52′26″S 151°12′23″E
St James Cathedral	Townsville	Queensland		19°15′20″S 146°49′00″E
Holy Trinity Cathedral	Wangaratta	Victoria		36°21′18″S 146°19′16″E
St Michael's Pro-Cathedral	Wollongong	New South Wales		34°25′25″S 150°53′44″E

Former cathedrals

Cathedral	City	State/Territory	Image	Coordinates
St James Old Cathedral	Melbourne	Victoria		37°42′26″S 144°56′17.9″E
Christ Church Old Cathedral	St. Arnaud	Victoria		
All Souls and St Bartholomew's Cathedral Church	Thursday Island		Quetta Memorial Cathedral Church, 2014	10°34′44″S 142°13′12″E

== Assyrian ==
The following Assyrian Church of the East and Ancient Church of the East cathedrals are located in Australia:

Cathedral	City/Suburb	State	Image	Coordinates	Notes
Assyrian Church of the East, Cathedral of St Hurmizd	Greenfield Park	New South Wales		33°52′18″S 150°53′28″E	
Ancient Church of the East, Cathedral of St Zaia	Middleton Grange	New South Wales		33°54′47″S 150°50′28″E	

== Catholic ==
=== Latin Church ===
The following Latin Church cathedrals of the Catholic Church in Australia are located in Australia:

Cathedral	City	State/Territory	Image	Coordinates
St Francis Xavier's Cathedral	Adelaide	South Australia		34°55′44″S 138°36′05″E
St Mary and St Joseph's Cathedral	Armidale	New South Wales		28°46′38″S 114°36′43″E
St Patrick's Cathedral	Ballarat	Victoria		37°33′45″S 143°51′09″E
St Michael & John's Cathedral	Bathurst	New South Wales		33°25′12″S 149°34′38″E
Sacred Heart Cathedral	Bendigo	Victoria		36°45′36″S 144°16′26″E
St Stephen's Cathedral	Brisbane	Queensland		27°28′09″S 153°01′44″E
Sacred Heart Cathedral	Broken Hill	New South Wales		31°57′12″S 141°27′33″E
Our Lady Queen of Peace Cathedral	Broome	Western Australia		17°57′35″S 122°14′19″E
St Patrick's Cathedral	Bunbury	Western Australia		33°19′53″S 115°38′16″E
St Monica's War Memorial Cathedral	Cairns	Queensland		16°55′02″S 145°46′21″E
St Christopher's Cathedral	Canberra	Australian Capital Territory		35°19′08″S 149°07′57″E
St Mary's Star of the Sea Cathedral	Darwin	Northern Territory		12°27′33″S 130°50′18″E
St Francis Xavier's Cathedral	Geraldton	Western Australia		28°46′39″S 114°36′43″E
St Mary's Cathedral	Hobart	Tasmania		42°52′52″S 147°19′09″E
St Carthage's Cathedral	Lismore	New South Wales		28°48′16″S 153°17′01″E
St Patrick's Cathedral	Melbourne	Victoria		37°48′37″S 144°58′35″E
Sacred Heart Cathedral	Newcastle	New South Wales		32°55′25″S 151°45′15″E
St Patrick's Cathedral	Parramatta	New South Wales		33°48′31″S 151°00′13″E
Cathedral of the Immaculate Conception of the Blessed Virgin Mary	Perth	Western Australia		31°57′20″S 115°52′00″E
Principal Church of St Ninian & St Chad	Perth	Western Australia		31°56′06″S 115°54′11″E
St Mark's Cathedral	Port Pirie	South Australia		33°10′45″S 138°00′30″E
St Joseph's Cathedral	Rockhampton	Queensland		23°23′09″S 150°30′24″E
St Mary's Cathedral	Sale	Victoria		38°06′41″S 147°03′44″E
St Mary's Cathedral	Sydney	New South Wales		33°52′16″S 151°12′48″E
St Patrick's Cathedral	Toowoomba	Queensland		27°34′10″S 151°57′13″E
Sacred Heart Cathedral	Townsville	Queensland		19°15′32″S 146°48′42″E
St Michael's Cathedral	Wagga Wagga	New South Wales		35°06′24″S 147°22′24″E
Our Lady of the Rosary Cathedral	Waitara	New South Wales		33°42′50″S 151°06′16″E
St Francis Xavier's Cathedral	Wollongong	New South Wales		34°25′33″S 150°54′07″E
St John Vianney Co-Cathedral	Fairy Meadow (co-cathedral with St Francis Xavier, Wollongong)	New South Wales		34°23′52″S 150°53′30″E

Former and never completed Latin Rite cathedrals

Cathedral	City	State	Image	Coordinates	Notes
Holy Name Cathedral	Brisbane	Queensland		27°27′48.36″S 153°1′44.55″E	never completed
Ss Peter & Paul's Old Cathedral	Goulburn	New South Wales		34°45′20″S 149°42′54″E	
Most Holy Trinity	New Norcia	Western Australia		30°58′14″S 116°12′49″E	Former abbatial cathedral
Corpus Christi Cathedral	St Ives	New South Wales		33°43′41″S 151°09′57″E	
St Mary's Cathedral	South Bunbury	Western Australia		33°20′32″S 115°38′38″E	

=== Eastern Rites ===
The following Eastern Rite Catholic cathedrals are located in Australia:

Cathedral	City	State	Image	Coordinates	Notes
St Maroun's Cathedral	Redfern	New South Wales		33°53′34″S 151°12′26″E	Maronite Rite
Our Lady of Lebanon Co-Cathedral	Harris Park	New South Wales		33°49′13″S 151°00′53″E	Maronite Rite
St Michael's Cathedral	Darlington	New South Wales		33°53′36″S 151°11′20″E	Melkite Greek
St Thomas the Apostle Chaldean Catholic Church	Bossley Park	New South Wales		33°51′25″S 150°53′05″E	Chaldean Catholic
Ss Peter and Paul Ukrainian Catholic Cathedral	North Melbourne	Victoria		37°47′47″S 144°56′39″E	Ukrainian Rite

== Eastern Orthodox ==
The following Eastern Orthodox cathedrals are located in Australia:

Cathedral	City/Suburb	State	Image	Coordinates	Notes
St Nicholas Russian Orthodox Cathedral	Brisbane	Queensland		27.484°S 153.0345°E	Russian Orthodox
St George Cathedral	Cabramatta	New South Wales		33.898429°S 150.924960°E	Serbian Orthodox
Cathedral of the Annunciation	Redfern	New South Wales		33°53′20″S 151°12′09″E	Greek Orthodox, Patriarchate of Constantinople
St George Cathedral	Redfern	New South Wales		33°53′31″S 151°12′32″E	Greek Orthodox, Patriarchate of Antioch
Ss Peter & Paul Cathedral	Strathfield	New South Wales		33°52′30″S 151°05′20″E	Russian Orthodox

== Oriental Orthodox ==
The following Oriental Orthodox cathedrals are located in Australia:

Cathedral	City	State	Image	Coordinates	Notes
St Mary & Mina's Coptic Orthodox Cathedral	Bexley	New South Wales		33.945872°S 151.127226°E	
St Thomas Indian Orthodox Cathedral	Sydney	New South Wales		33°57′22″S 150°56′43″E	

== See also ==
- List of cathedrals
- List of cathedrals in Britain
- List of cathedrals in USA

== Sources ==
- List of cathedrals in Australia by Giga-Catholic Information
- The Official Directory of the Catholic Church in Australia 2005/2006. published with the authority of the Australian Catholic Bishops Conference, by the National Council of Priests of Australia, McPherson's Printing Group, Maryborough, Victoria. 1977. ISSN 1321-4764.
- O'Farrell, Patrick (1977). The Catholic Church and Community in Australia. Thomas Nelson (Australia), West Melbourne.
