= St Peter's Catholic College, Tuggerah =

St Peter’s Catholic College

Location
- 84 Gavenlock Road, Tuggerah, Central Coast region, New South Wales; Australia; 33°18′1″S 151°24′46″E

Information
- Former names: Mater Dei College (1982–1999); Corpus Christi College (1987–1999)
- Type: Independent co-educational secondary day school
- Motto: Live the Faith
- Denomination: Roman Catholic
- Patron saint: Saint Peter
- Established: 1982 (as Mater Dei College); 1987 (Corpus Christi College); 2000; 26 years ago (as St Peter's Catholic College)
- Oversight: Roman Catholic Diocese of Broken Bay
- Principal: Ms Roisin McVeigh
- Assistant Principal - Student Achievement: Mrs Kylie Robinson (Acting – Term 1)
- Assistant Principal - Evangelisation and Catechesis: Mrs Melanie Butlin
- Teaching staff: 90 (2016)
- Years: 7–12
- Enrolment: 1050 (2016)
- Campus type: Suburban
- Houses: Benedict; Francis; Patrick; Vincent
- Website: www.stpetersdbb.catholic.edu.au

St Peter's Catholic College is an independent Roman Catholic co-educational secondary day school, located in the Central Coast suburb of Tuggerah, one hour north of Sydney, New South Wales, Australia. Located in the Roman Catholic Diocese of Broken Bay, the college currently has 1,050 students.

== College history ==
=== Site origin ===
St Peter's Catholic College is within the region of Tuggerah, which according to Aboriginal tradition means savannah, and marshy grassland is evident on the site.

The land, on which the college stands, 915 hectares (2,260 acres), was owned by the Alison family, a wealthy Scottish family, from 1875 - 1897. The site was purchased by the Diocese of Broken Bay in 1982.

=== Corpus Christi and Mater Dei amalgamation ===
The College has developed through three major building phases since its foundation in 1983. In the beginning, Mater Dei College was built to operate as a Year 7-10 campus for the Catholic community. This was accompanied in 1987 by the progression of a senior campus known as Corpus Christi College. Mater Dei and Corpus Christi Colleges amalgamated in January 2000 to become St Peter’s Catholic College as a Year 7-12 campus.”

== Principals ==
=== Mater Dei College ===
The following individuals have served as College Principal:

Ordinal	Officeholders	Term start	Term end	Time in office	Notes
1	Sister Judith Sipple RSJ	1982	1986	3–4 years	
2	Michael Bowman	1987	1991	3–4 years	
3	Michael Slattery	1992	1999	6–7 years	

=== Corpus Christi College ===
The following individuals have served as College Principal:

Ordinal	Officeholders	Term start	Term end	Time in office	Notes
1	Sister Judith Sipple RSJ	1987	1990	2–3 years	
2	Bob Wilson	1991	1995	3–4 years	
3	Kendall Perriam	1996	1996	0 years	Acting
4	Jim Callinan	1997	1999	1–2 years	

=== St Peter's Catholic College ===
The following individuals have served as College Principal:

Ordinal	Officeholders	Term start	Term end	Time in office	Notes
1	Alan Martin	2000	2001	0–1 years	
2	Vicki Comerford	2002	2009	6–7 years	
3	Tony McCudden	2010	2013	2–3 years	
4	Michelle Peters	2014	2016	1–2 years	
5	Tim Hildebrandt	2017	2024	8–9 years	
6	Roisin McVeigh	2024	** incumbent **	1–2 years	

== Alumni ==
=== Sportspeople ===
Athletics

- Rosemary Hayward

Australian rules football

- Jarrad McVeigh
- Mark McVeigh

Baseball

- Chris Snelling

Netball

- Megan Anderson
- Lauren Moore

Rugby league

- Ryan O'Hara
- Olivia Kernick

Soccer

- Damien Brown
- Cassandra Kell
- James Holland
- Michael Glassock

=== Singers/actors ===
- Belinda Emmett
- Natalie Imbruglia

=== Authors ===
- Ingrid Jonach
