= Diocese of Broken Bay =

Latin Catholic diocese in Australia

Diocese of Broken Bay Dioecesis Sinus Tortuosi
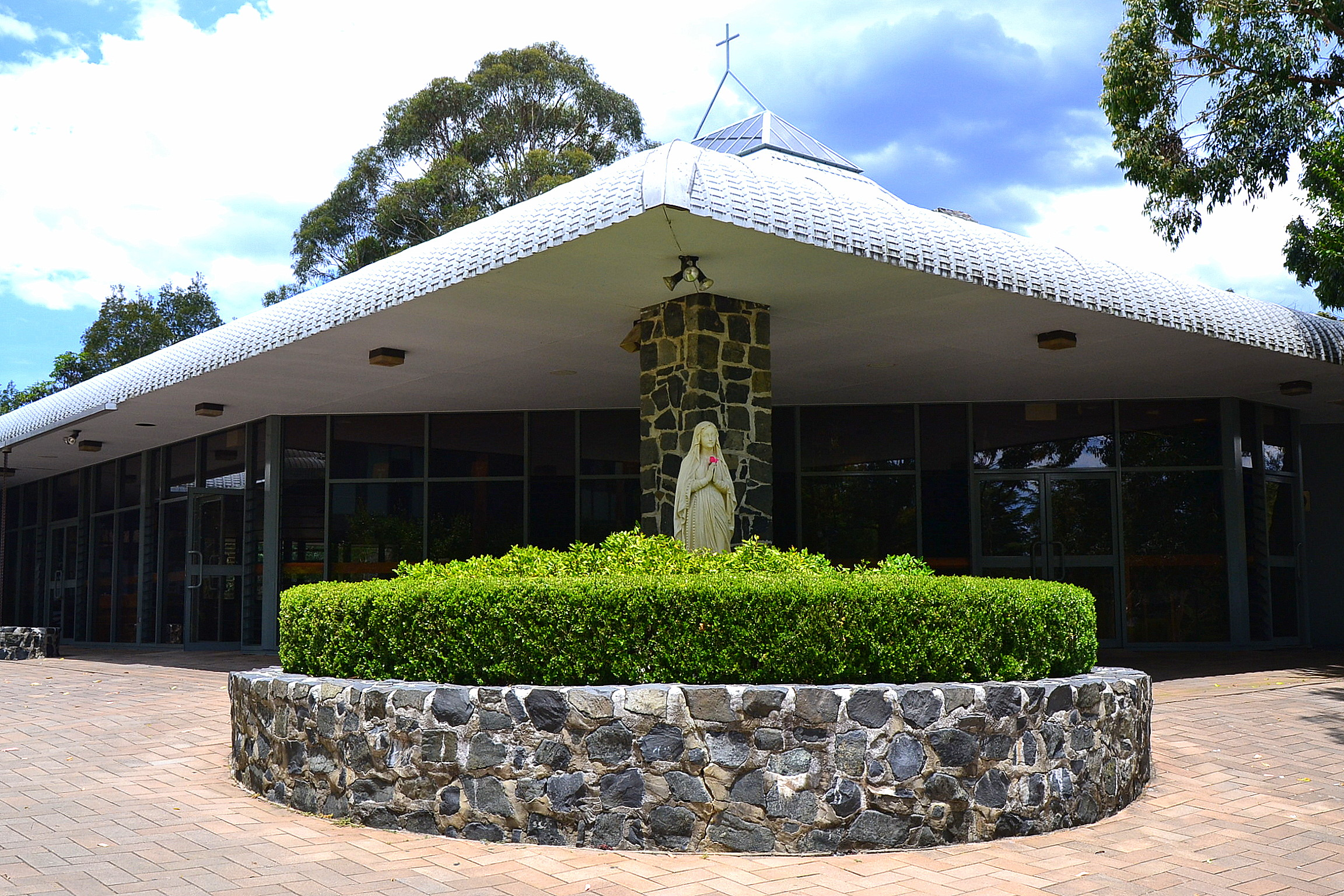

Location
- Country: Australia
- Territory: North Shore and Northern Beaches regions of greater metropolitan Sydney, Broken Bay and Central Coast regions of New South Wales
- Ecclesiastical province: Sydney
- Coordinates: 33°44′04″S 151°04′08″E

Statistics
- Area: 2,763 km^{2} (1,067 sq mi)
- Population: Total; Catholics: (as of 2006); ▲819,000; ▲206,000 (▲25.2%)
- Parishes: 40

Information
- Denomination: Catholic Church
- Sui iuris church: Latin Church
- Rite: Roman Rite
- Established: 8 April 1986
- Cathedral: Our Lady of the Rosary, Waitara

Current leadership
- Pope: Leo XIV
- Bishop: Sede vacante
- Metropolitan Archbishop: Anthony Fisher OP
- Apostolic Administrator: Anthony Randazzo
- Bishops emeritus: Anthony Randazzo David Walker

Map
- The diocese is in the south east of Australia

Website
- bbcatholic.org.au

The Diocese of Broken Bay is a Latin Church ecclesiastical jurisdiction or diocese of the Catholic Church in Australia. It is a suffragan diocese in the ecclesiastical province of the metropolitan Archdiocese of Sydney.

The current apostolic administrator of the diocese is Archbishop Anthony Randazzo who was previously the bishop ordinary. Randazzo was appointed the fourth bishop of the diocese on 7 October 2019. Following a meeting with Pope Leo XIV in March 2026, Randazzo was appointed as the prefect of the Dicastery for Legislative Texts on 25 March 2026. He intends to remain the apostolic administrator of the diocese for three months before moving to Rome.

== History ==
The Diocese of Broken Bay was erected on 8 April 1986. Prior to this date, the area was considered within the jurisdiction of the Archdiocese of Sydney.

According to Roman Catholic Church records, in 1822 Governor Thomas Brisbane granted 490 hectares (1,200 acres) land near Pittwater to Father John Joseph Therry for the purposes of establishing a church. However, attempts to establish a church in 1859 were postponed due to the scarcity of Catholics. A church in Manly was established in 1873 and another in Careel Bay in 1875. In 1876, Manly was the site of the first parish established in the area, followed by Gosford (1888) and Pymble (1889). Together these three parishes covered most of the present diocese until 1910. By 1885, work on St Patrick's College, Manly had commenced and was completed in 1888.

The diocese covers 2,763 km^{2} (1,067 sq mi) and includes both bush and coastal communities. Symbolising the diocese is the lighthouse, based on the historic lighthouse at Barrenjoey.

== Bishops of Broken Bay ==
The following men have been Bishop of Broken Bay:

Order	Name	Date installed	Term ended	Term of office	Reason for term end
1	Patrick Laurence Murphy	8 April 1986	9 July 1996	10 years, 92 days	Resigned and appointed Bishop Emeritus of Broken Bay
2	David Louis Walker	9 July 1996	11 November 2013	17 years, 125 days	Resigned and appointed Bishop Emeritus of Broken Bay
3	Peter Andrew Comensoli	12 December 2014	1 August 2018	3 years, 232 days	Appointed Archbishop of Melbourne
4	Anthony Randazzo	7 October 2019	25 March 2026	6 years, 169 days	Appointed Prefect of the Dicastery for Legislative Texts

== Cathedral ==
On 10 February 2008, Our Lady of the Rosary in Waitara was inaugurated as the cathedral of the diocese, succeeding Corpus Christi, the parish church of St Ives.

== Derivative agencies and offices ==
The Diocese of Broken Bay operates a number of agencies and offices to manage various functions of the diocese such as Catholic outreach and evangelism, family support, disability support and education.

- Office for Safeguarding and Professional Standards (Chancery) responsible for the administration and management of professional standards, child protection, and safeguarding responsibilities within the diocese.
- CatholicCare (Diocese of Broken Bay) belonging to Catholic Social Services Australia responsible for the provision and administration of services for families, children, and people with disabilities as well as foster care and out-of-home services.
- Catholic Development Fund (CDF) responsible for the management of funds belonging to the diocese and acts as its official treasury service for funds to religious, charitable and educational services. The CDF is considered a charitable institution under the Australian Taxation Office's definitions.
- Office of Evangelisation responsible for Catholic outreach and the promotion of the diocese as well as individual parishes, members, and communities.
- Catholic Schools Office responsible for the administration and oversight of private Catholic schools within the diocese, currently 44 in total (36 primary schools and 8 high schools).
- Bishop David L Walker Library responsible for the provision and management of information resources, especially that relating to Roman Catholicism and relevant teachings.

== Parishes ==
- Arcadia (St Benedict)
- Carlingford (St Gerard) and Epping (Our Lady Help of Christians)
- Chatswood (Our Lady of Dolours)
- Frenchs Forest – combining the parishes of Davidson (St Martin de Porres), Forestville (Our Lady of Good Counsel), and Terrey Hills (St Anthony in the Fields)
- Gosford (St Patrick)
- Hornsby – combining the parishes of Waitara Cathedral (Our Lady of the Rosary) and Normanhurst (Queen of Peace)
- Kincumber (Holy Cross)
- Ku-ring-gai Chase – combining the parishes of Asquith (St Patrick), Berowra (St Bernard), and Brooklyn (Peace Chapel)
- The Lakes – combining the parishes of Collaroy Plateau (St Rose) and Narrabeen (St Joseph)
- Lindfield-Killara – combining the parishes of Killara (Immaculate Heart of Mary) and Lindfield (Holy Family)
- Lower North Shore – combining the parishes of Naremburn (St Leonard), Northbridge (St Philip Neri), and Willoughby (St Thomas)
- Manly Freshwater – combining the parishes of Harbord (St John the Baptist) and Manly (Mary Immaculate & St Athanasius)
- North Harbour – combining the parishes of Balgowlah (St Cecilia) and Manly Vale (St Kieran)
- Pennant Hills (St Agatha)
- Pittwater – combining the parishes of Avalon (Maria Regina) and Mona Vale (Sacred Heart)
- Pymble (Sacred Heart) and West Pymble (Our Lady of Perpetual Succour)
- St Ives (Corpus Christi)
- Terrigal (Our Lady Star of the Sea)
- The Entrance (Our Lady of the Rosary)
- Toukley (St Mary)
- Warringah – combining the parishes of Dee Why (St Kevin) and Narraweena (St John, Apostle & Evangelist)
- Wahroonga (Holy Name)
- Warnervale (St Mary of the Cross MacKillop)
- Willoughby (St Thomas)
- Woy Woy (St John the Baptist)
- Wyoming (Our Lady of the Rosary)
- Wyong (St Cecilia)

== Schools ==
As of 2006 the diocese was responsible for overseeing the management of 43 schools in its regions (36 Catholic primary schools and 7 Catholic secondary schools) with around 15,000 students. The schools in the diocese are:

Primary

- Corpus Christi Catholic Primary School, St Ives
- Holy Cross Catholic Primary School, Kincumber
- Holy Family Catholic Primary School, Lindfield
- Maria Regina Catholic Primary School, Avalon
- Our Lady Help of Christians Catholic Primary School, Epping
- Our Lady of Dolours Catholic Primary School, Chatswood
- Our Lady of Good Counsel Catholic Primary School, Forestville
- Our Lady of Perpetual Succour Catholic Primary School, West Pymble
- Our Lady of the Rosary Catholic Primary School, Waitara
- Our Lady of the Rosary Catholic Primary School, Shelly Beach
- Our Lady of the Rosary Catholic Primary School, Wyoming
- Our Lady Star of the Sea Catholic Primary School, Terrigal
- Prouille Catholic Primary School, Wahroonga
- Sacred Heart Catholic Primary School, Mona Vale
- Sacred Heart Catholic Primary School, Pymble
- St Agatha's Catholic Primary School, Pennant Hills
- St Bernard's Catholic Primary School, Berowra Heights
- St Brendan's Catholic Primary School, Lake Munmorah
- St Cecilia's Catholic Primary School, Balgowlah
- St Cecilia's Catholic Primary School, Wyong
- St Gerard's Catholic Primary School, Carlingford
- St John Fisher Catholic Primary School, Tumbi Umbi
- St John the Baptist Catholic Primary School, Freshwater
- St John the Baptist Catholic Primary School, Woy Woy South
- St John's Catholic Primary School, Narraweena
- St Joseph's Catholic Primary School, Narrabeen
- St Kevin's Catholic Primary School, Dee Why
- St Kieran's Catholic Primary School, Manly Vale
- St Martin's Catholic Primary School, Davidson
- St Mary's Catholic Primary School, Manly
- St Mary's Catholic Primary School, Noraville
- St Patrick's Catholic Primary School, Asquith
- St Patrick's Catholic Primary School, East Gosford
- St Philip Neri Catholic Primary School, Northbridge
- St Rose Catholic Primary School, Collaroy Plateau
- St Thomas' Catholic Primary School, Willoughby

Secondary

- Mater Maria Catholic College (Co-ed), Warriewood
- Mercy Catholic College (Girls), Chatswood
- St Joseph's Catholic College (Girls), East Gosford
- St Leo's Catholic College (Co-ed), Wahroonga
- St Paul's Catholic College (Co-ed), Manly
- St Peter's Catholic College (Co-ed), Tuggerah

Primary and secondary

- MacKillop Catholic College (Co-ed), Warnervale

== See also ==
- Patricia Madigan
