= Holly Lincoln-Smith =

Australian water polo player

Holly Young
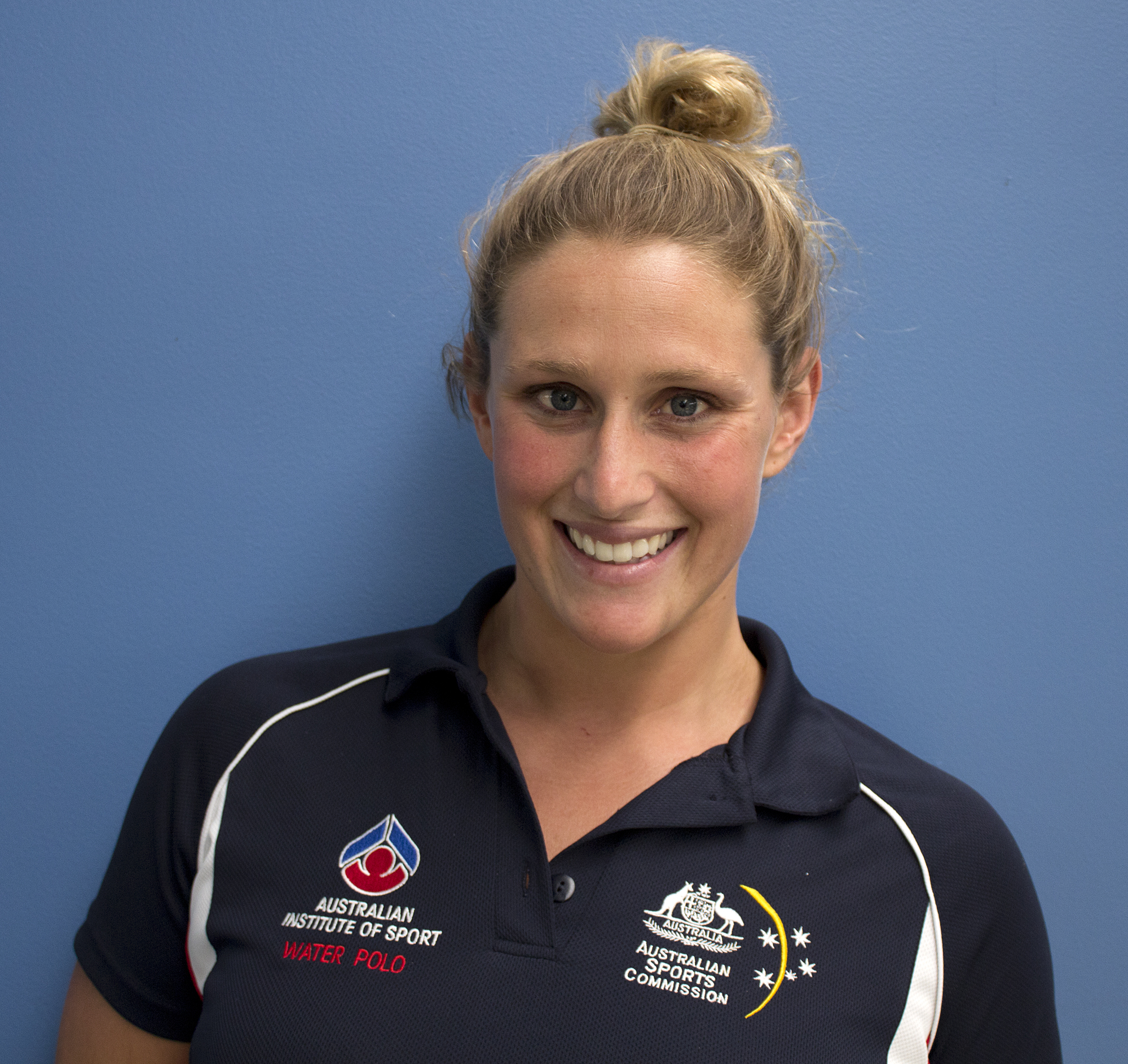

Personal information
- Full name: Holly Jane Young
- Nationality: Australian
- Born: Holly Jane Lincoln-Smith; 26 March 1988 (age 38) Sydney
- Height: 183 cm (6 ft 0 in)
- Weight: 85 kg (187 lb)

Sport
- Sport: Water polo
- Event: Women's team
- Club: Cronulla Water Polo Club
- Team: Cronulla Water Sharks
Medal record
Olympic Games
Bronze medal – third place	2012 London	Team competition
World Championships
Silver medal – second place	2013 Barcelona	Team competition
FINA World Juniors
Gold medal – first place	2007 World Juniors	Team competition
Canada Cup
Gold medal – first place	2011 Canada Cup	Team competition
FINA World Cup
Silver medal – second place	2010 Christchurch	Team competition

Holly Jane Young (née Lincoln-Smith born 26 March 1988) is an Australian former water polo player. Her sister is skeleton competitor Emma Lincoln-Smith. They are the first set of Australian siblings where one competed at the Summer Olympics and the other at the Winter Olympics.

In 2006, she was made her first appearance on Australia's senior team, with her first major international tournament representing Australia being the 2009 FINA World League Super Finals. As a member of Australian national sides, she has earned gold medals at the 2007 FINA Junior World Championships and 2011 Canada Cup, and a silver medal at the 2010 FINA Women's Water Polo World Cup. She represented Australia at the 2012 Summer Olympics, winning a bronze medal and also at the 2016 Summer Olympics.

== Personal life ==
Lincoln-Smith was born on 26 March 1988 in Sydney. She has two sisters and is her parents's youngest child. As of 2010, she resided in Narrabeen, New South Wales. In 2004, she was living in Warriewood, New South Wales. In 2005, her father had open-heart surgery in order to remove a tumour and her mother was diagnosed with breast cancer. In 2009, her oldest sister died "after a long battle with anorexia and depression". In 2010, her sister Emma Lincoln-Smith represented Australia at the 2010 Winter Olympics in skeleton. The sisters are hoping to become the first set of sibling Olympians where one competed at the Summer Games and the other at the Winter Games. She is currently involved in a long-term relationship.

In 2001, at the age of 12, Lincoln-Smith competed in the U13 finals of the NSW Junior Surf Life Saving Championships. During the event, she rescued fellow competitor Tom Fabian, who was in distress. She left the course to rescue him, and after helping, got the attention of the safety crew on a boat, resumed her swim and finished 27th in the field of 40 swimmers.

Lincoln-Smith attended Mackellar Girls School, where Debbie Watson was her physical education teacher. In 2005, she completed her Higher School Certificate while a student at Queenwood School for Girls. She went on to attend Macquarie University where she is doing a course on Human Resource Management. As of 2011, she was in her third year of the programme. In 2008, she earned a scholarship from Macquarie Sports to help her focus on water polo. As part of the scholarship, the Macquarie Group required her to spend a week in their offices where she received some "work experience as a trader in foreign exchange".

Lincoln-Smith is right-handed and has a tattoo on her left ankle of a cherry blossom, which represents her family.

She married in 2014.

== Water polo ==
Lincoln-Smith is a centre forward and prefers to wear cap number two or four. She started playing the sport as a 13-year-old at Mackellar Girls Campus where Debbie Watson, an Olympic gold medalist and the school's water polo coach, nagged her to try the sport. She has held a scholarship for water polo from the New South Wales Institute of Sport and the Australian Institute of Sport.

In 2004, she represented New South Wales at the U17 national championships where the team came out on top, and she was the leading goal scorer and named the player of the tournament. This victory was one of the contributing factors to her getting a call up to the junior national team. In 2008, she represented New South Wales as a member of the U20 team at the national championships. Her team took home gold after a 9–6 victory over Western Australia where she scored three goals in the match. The 2008 win was her fourth and final U20 national championship win. In 2009, shortly after her eldest sister's death, she seriously injured her shoulder when she dislocated it while at the gym and required reconstruction surgery on it. As a result, she was unable to compete in water polo for nine months.

=== Club water polo ===
Lincoln-Smith played her club water polo for the Cronulla Water Polo Club in the National Water Polo League. She was a member of the team in 2009 and 2011. She was with the club for the 2012 season that started in February. As a member of the team, she helped them win the first two games of the season 8–4 and 7–4. She took a break from the team following their 18 February 2012 game in order to attend the national team training camp. Her last game before the break was against the Balmain Tigers. She did not play in the National Water Polo League in 2010 because of an injury.

=== Junior national team ===
Lincoln-Smith has represented Australia on the junior national level. Her first call up to the team was in 2005 when the U17 and U20 teams toured the United States and Europe. She was a member of the junior national side at the 2007 FINA U20 World Championships in Porto, Portugal that took home gold.

=== Senior national team ===
Lincoln-Smith was a member of the Australia women's national water polo team. She competed in a tournament in the United States for the senior side in 2006 because Melissa Rippon and Taniele Gofers were injured. In 2009, she was part of the Australian side that finished third at the FINA World League Super Finals in Kirishi, Russia. This was her first major tournament on the senior side. In 2009, at the FINA World Championships where Australia finished sixth, she was named by her team as the Australian Player of the Tournament. This was her first major international tournament with the team.

In 2010, Lincoln-Smith was a member of the Stingers squad that competed at the FINA World Cup in Christchurch, New Zealand that took home a silver medal. She was part of the Australian side that won a silver medal at the 2011 Kirishi Cup in June. In the game for the medal, they played Kazakhstan women's national water polo team. In that match, she scored three goals. At the 2011 Canada Cup, she scored a goal in the first period in the gold medal match against China that the Australian team ended up winning. She represented Australia at the 2011 FINA World Championships. She competed in the Pan Pacific Championships in January 2012 for the Australian Barbarians. She was part of the Stingers squad that competed in a five-game test against Great Britain at the AIS in late February 2012. This was the team's first matches against Great Britain's national team in six years. In the first game of the test series on 21 February 2012, Australia won 13 – 5, she scored one goal. She was part of the squad that won bronze at the 2012 Summer Olympics.

=== Retirement ===
Lincoln-Smith retired from water polo after competing in the 2016 Summer Olympics. She said in 2017 "Physically, I would not have been able to continue playing. After two major shoulder surgeries, thumb surgery, back and hip issues, I had to walk away."

== Post playing ==
In 2017, she developed an app for planning weddings.

== Awards ==
In 2005, the New South Wales Institute of Sport awarded Lincoln-Smith the Ian Thorpe Grand Slam International outstanding achievement award, and she had an opportunity to meet Ian Thorpe.

== See also ==
- List of Olympic medalists in water polo (women)
- List of World Aquatics Championships medalists in water polo
