= Emma Lincoln-Smith =

Australian skeleton racer

Emma Lincoln-Smith (born 28 November 1985) is an Australian skeleton racer who has competed since 2004. Her best Skeleton World Cup finish was seventh twice (Lake Placid - December 2007, Cesana Pariol - January 2008).

Born in Warriewood, New South Wales, Lincoln-Smith went to Manly West Primary School in Sydney's Northern Beaches and Northern Beaches Secondary College Mackeller Girls Campus where she started her career to becoming a sports champion. In 2005, her mother, Viki, was diagnosed with breast cancer and her father, Marcus, underwent open heart surgery. Lincoln-Smith's older sister Jess died in 2009. Her younger sister Holly is an Australian international water polo player, who was part of the Australian squads that were runners-up at the 2010 FINA Women's Water Polo World Cup and bronze medallists at the 2012 Summer Olympics. Emma and Holly are the first siblings to compete for Australia at the Summer and Winter Olympics.

Lincoln-Smith's best finish at the FIBT World Championships was 12th in the women's event at St. Moritz in 2007. She competed in the 2010 Winter Olympics where she placed tenth overall.
