= Joseph Hitti =

Lebanese priest (1925–2022)

Joseph Habib Hitti
- Eparch of Saint Maron of Sydney
- Native name: چوزيف حبيب حتى
- Church: Maronite Church
- Diocese: Eparchy of Saint Maron of Sydney
- In office: 23 November 1990 – 26 October 2001
- Predecessor: Ignace Abdo Khalifé
- Successor: Ad Abi Karam

Orders
- Ordination: 24 March 1951 by Émile Blanchet
- Consecration: 6 January 1991 by Pope John Paul II

Personal details
- Born: 30 September 1925 Aitou, Mandatory Greater Lebanon, French Empire
- Died: 3 February 2022 (aged 96) Beirut, Lebanon

Joseph Habib Hitti (30 September 1925 – 3 February 2022) was a Lebanese-born Australian Maronite Catholic eparch (bishop) of the Maronite Catholic Eparchy of Saint Maron of Sydney from 23 November 1990 until 26 October 2001.

== Life ==
Hitti was born in Aitou, Greater Lebanon, France. On 24 March 1951 he was ordained to the priesthood. Pope John Paul II appointed him, on 23 November 1990, bishop of the Eparchy of Saint Maron of Sydney. The Pope personally ordained him as a bishop on 6 January 1991. The co-consecrators were the curia archbishops Giovanni Battista Re, substitute of the Secretariat of State (Holy See), and Justin Francis Rigali, secretary of the Congregation for Bishops. On 4 March 1991, Hitti was inducted to the office.

On 26 October 2001, Pope John Paul II accepted Hitti's age-related resignation. He died on 3 February 2022, at the age of 96.
