= Mater Maria Catholic College =

Location
- 5 Forest Road, Warriewood, Northern Beaches, Sydney, New South Wales; Australia; 33°41′03″S 151°17′04″E

Information
- Type: Independent co-educational secondary day school
- Motto: Walk in New Life
- Religious affiliation: Sisters of the Good Samaritan
- Denomination: Roman Catholicism
- Established: 1962; 64 years ago
- Founders: Sisters of the Good Samaritan
- Oversight: Roman Catholic Diocese of Broken Bay
- Principal: Marc Reicher
- Teaching staff: 83
- Grades: 7–12
- Enrolment: 1,010 (2017)
- Colours: Green and white
- Website: www.matermaria.nsw.edu.au

Mater Maria Catholic College is an independent Roman Catholic co-educational secondary day school, located in Warriewood, on the Northern Beaches of Sydney, New South Wales, Australia. It was established in 1962 by the Sisters of the Good Samaritan and is located in the Roman Catholic Diocese of Broken Bay.

== History ==
In January 1962, Sisters of the Good Samaritan founded a secondary school for thirty-eight Catholic girls at Narrabeen. In 1964 the college moved to Forest Road at Warriewood. The school's immediate priority was to educate the girls in a peaceful environment. By 1979, the local population growth and demand led to the decision to expand and establish the college as co-educational. In 1984, students sat for the Higher School Certificate for the first time at the College. The majority of these students had been the pioneers of co-education at the college in 1979 and had become the founding members of the new senior school.

Over the next decades, new facilities were built concurrent with developments in curriculum and increasing enrolment. Contributions from the Commonwealth and the five feeder parishes financed five new buildings that were opened in the period from 1974 to 1990 and the Sisters donated the land to the College in perpetuity in 1980. In 1990 the first Lay Principal was appointed. During the 1990s significant changes were made in management, pastoral care and the curriculum. In 2002, the Bush `bush' Chapel was closed and decommissioned in preparation for the largest integral expansion at the College.

John Ducker, the former president of the Australian Labor Party, the Australian Council of Trade Unions, and a member of the NSW Legislative Council, was the first chairperson of the Parent's Board. One of the school buildings is named after Ducker.

== Notable alumni ==
- James Dargaville – rugby union footballer

== See also ==
- List of Catholic schools in New South Wales
- Catholic education in Australia
