= Maronite Catholic Eparchy of Saint Maron of Sydney =

Maronite Catholic eparchy in Australia

Eparchy of Saint Maron of Sydney (Maronite) Eparchia Sancti Maronis Sydneyensis Maronitarum
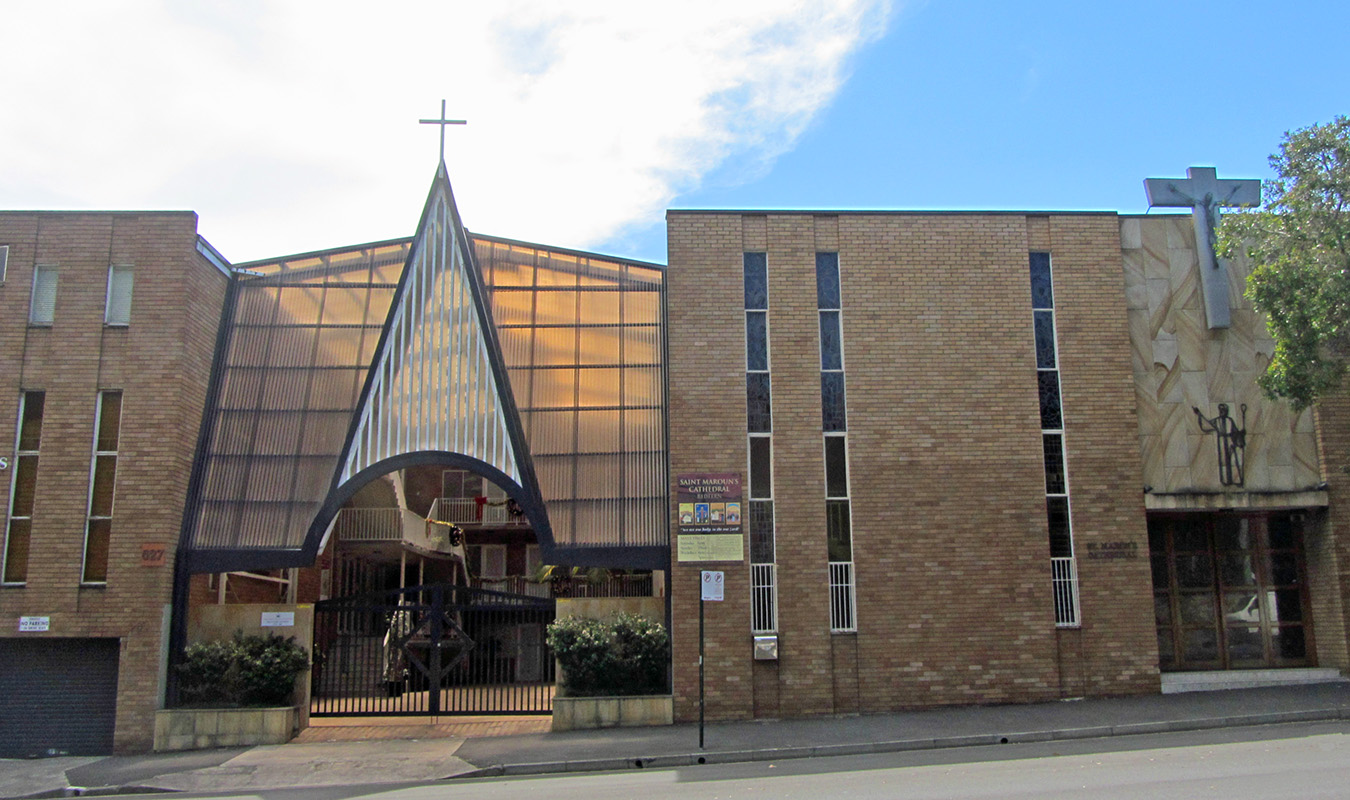

Location
- Country: Australia
- Metropolitan: Immediately exempt to the Holy See

Statistics
- Population: (as of 2010); 160,000 (n/a%)
- Parishes: 11

Information
- Denomination: Catholic Church
- Sui iuris church: Maronite Church
- Rite: West Syriac Rite
- Established: 25 June 1973
- Cathedral: St. Maron's Cathedral
- Co-cathedral: Our Lady of Lebanon Co-Cathedral

Current leadership
- Pope: Leo XIV
- Patriarch: Bechara Boutros al-Rahi
- Eparch: Anthony Tarabay
- Bishops emeritus: Joseph Hitti, Ad Abi Karam

Website
- Maronite Eparchy of Australia

The Maronite Eparchy of Saint Maron of Sydney (in Latin: Eparchia Sancti Maronis Sydneyensis Maronitarum) (sometimes spelt Maroun) is a Maronite Church ecclesiastical jurisdiction or eparchy of the Catholic Church in Australia. In 2010 there were 160,000 members. It is currently ruled by Eparch Antoine-Charbel Tarabay, OLM.

== Territory and statistics ==
The Eparchy of St. Maron of Sydney has jurisdiction over all Catholics of the Maronite Church in Australia. It has many churches, schools, nursing homes and other institutions in all major cities. Its eparchial seat is in Redfern, New South Wales, a suburb of Sydney, where is located the St. Maron's Cathedral, Sydney. In 2010 there were 160,000 Lebanese Maronite Catholics in 11 parishes, the largest of which is at Our Lady of Lebanon Co-Cathedral in Harris Park, New South Wales.

== History ==
=== 19th Century ===
Due to a large emigration of Lebanese Maronite Christians in the mid to late 19th century, the Maronite Patriarch in 1889 decided that pastoral ministry among the Lebanese Christians in Sydney would be established. In this regard, the Maronite priests Abdallah Yazbeck and Joseph Dahdah were to work for the diaspora's community in Sydney and reached Sydney's port on 8 May 1893. They set up a Maronite chapel in the Waterloo district in 1894 and served until 1897, when a new church was inaugurated by the then Cardinal Moran on 10 January 1897, for the service of the Maronites. Yazbeck died in 1933 in Sydney, and Dahdah died after his return to Lebanon in 1936.

=== Twentieth century ===
The priest Abdallah Assaf was the successor and was the Maronite pastor until 1960. Assaf was replaced by Chukrallah Harb in 1961 until his return in 1963 to the Vatican City. The district of Redfern's Saint Maron Church served all Maronite Catholics for 70 years until the Maronites of the community settled in other centers, such as Parramatta. The community continued to grow rapidly. The Maronite Patriarch named Peter Ziade to continue the Harb's pastoral ministry in 1963. He was assisted by the priest Trad. From 1963 to 1965, the church of Saint Maron was built. In addition, a town hall, municipal school, and a rectory in the district of Redfern were built also in 1965. The Congregation of the Maronite Sisters of the Holy Family established their missionary work in 1968. A piece of land of Harris Park in Sydney with a community hall was built and the foundation stone for the Church of Our Lady of Lebanon was laid in 1970. Ziade helped to establish a Lebanese monastic order in Sydney and participated in the founding of the diocese in Australia.

The eparchy was erected on 25 June 1973 by Pope Paul VI's bull Illo fretis Councils. and in October 1973 Archbishop (pro hac vice) Ignace Abdo Khalif in Rome was established as Eparchy of the newly Maronite Catholic Eparchy of Saint Maron in Sydney. His duties included the organization and establishment of additional Maronite eparchies in Australia and request help from other priests. The first priests who had answered the bishop's request for help were Michal Boumelhem, Youseff Touma, Antoun Shalhoub and Nakhle Akiki. During their joint 18-year pastoral ministry for the Maronite Eparchy of Saint Maron in Sydney the Maronite Catholic Church of the Lady of Lebanon was opened in 1978. After that, Khalifé built the Church of the Saint Joseph in the district of Croydon and the Saint George in Thornleigh. This was followed by the acquisition of land for the bishopric in Strathfield district and the establishment of Antonine Sisters in Melbourne in 1981. In addition to the establishment of the Home of Our Lady of Lebanon, in Harris Park, Khalifé ordered the acquisition of land for the construction of the Our Lady of Lebanon Church in Wollongong, New South Wales. It also followed the acquisition of land for the construction of two houses near the church of Our Lady in Harris Park. Khalifé ended his mission in 1991 and was replaced by Eparch Joseph Hitti.

Hitti took over the diocese on 4 March 1991. Under his leadership, the Maronite community continued to grow. In 1993, the Congregation of Maronite Missionaries were welcomed by parish priest Sarkis Charbel and founded their pastoral mission in Sydney. The kindergarten facility in Belmore was inaugurated. The authorization for the acquisition of land for the establishment of a parent company for the Maronite nuns in Dulwich Hill has been permitted. Under Hitti, the Lebanese Our Lady of Lebanon University and the Saint Charbel high school were inaugurated. The Antonius monks were invited to Melbourne to begin their missionary work among the Maronite faithful. They accepted the invitation and came to Australia in December 1997. The inauguration of the newly established Secretariat in Strathfield was blessed by Hitti.

Bishop Ad Abi Karam was formally installed in office on 8 February 2002. He was the third Maronite Bishop of Australia.

On 17 April 2013 Eparch Anthony Tarabay replaced Karam and became the fourth Eparch of the Maronites in Australia.

== Parishes ==
The Maronite Eparchy has 17 parishes across Australia, with churches in New South Wales, Victoria, Queensland, South Australia and Western Australia.

New South Wales

- St Maroun's Cathedral (Redfern)
- Our Lady of Lebanon Co-Cathedral (Harris Park)
- St George's Church (Thornleigh)
- St Joseph's Church (Croydon)
- St Charbel's Church (Punchbowl)
- St John the Beloved Church (Mount Druitt)
- St Raymond's Church (Auburn South)
- St Rafqa's Church (Austral)
- Christ the Redeemer Maronite Catholic Parish (Dural)
- St John Paul II Church (Ryde)
- Our Lady of Lebanon (Wollongong)
- Our Lady of Mercy Maronite Church (Goulburn)

Victoria

- Our Lady of Lebanon Church (Thornbury)
- St Charbel's Church (Greenvale)

South Australia

- St Maroun's Church (Westbourne Park)

Queensland

- St Maroun's Church (Greenslopes)

Western Australia

- St Charbel's Church (East Cannington)

== Episcopal ordinaries ==
The following individuals have been elected as Maronite Eparch of Saint Maron:

Order	Name	Title	Date enthroned	Reign ended	Term of office	Reason for term end
1	Ignace Abdo Khalifé	Archbishop-bishop of St Maron of Sydney (Maronite)	25 June 1973	23 November 1990	17 years, 151 days	Retired
2	Joseph Hitti	Bishop of St Maron of Sydney (Maronite)	23 November 1990	26 October 2001	10 years, 337 days	Retired
3	Ad Abi Karam	Bishop of St Maron of Sydney (Maronite)	26 October 2001	17 April 2013	11 years, 173 days	Retired
3	Antoine-Charbel Tarabay	Bishop of St Maron of Sydney (Maronite)	17 April 2013	present	13 years, 185 days	

== See also ==
- Catholic Church in Australia
- List of Catholic dioceses (structured view)
- Christianity in the Middle East
