= St. Maroun's Cathedral, Sydney =

St. Maroun's Cathedral
- St Maron’s Cathedral
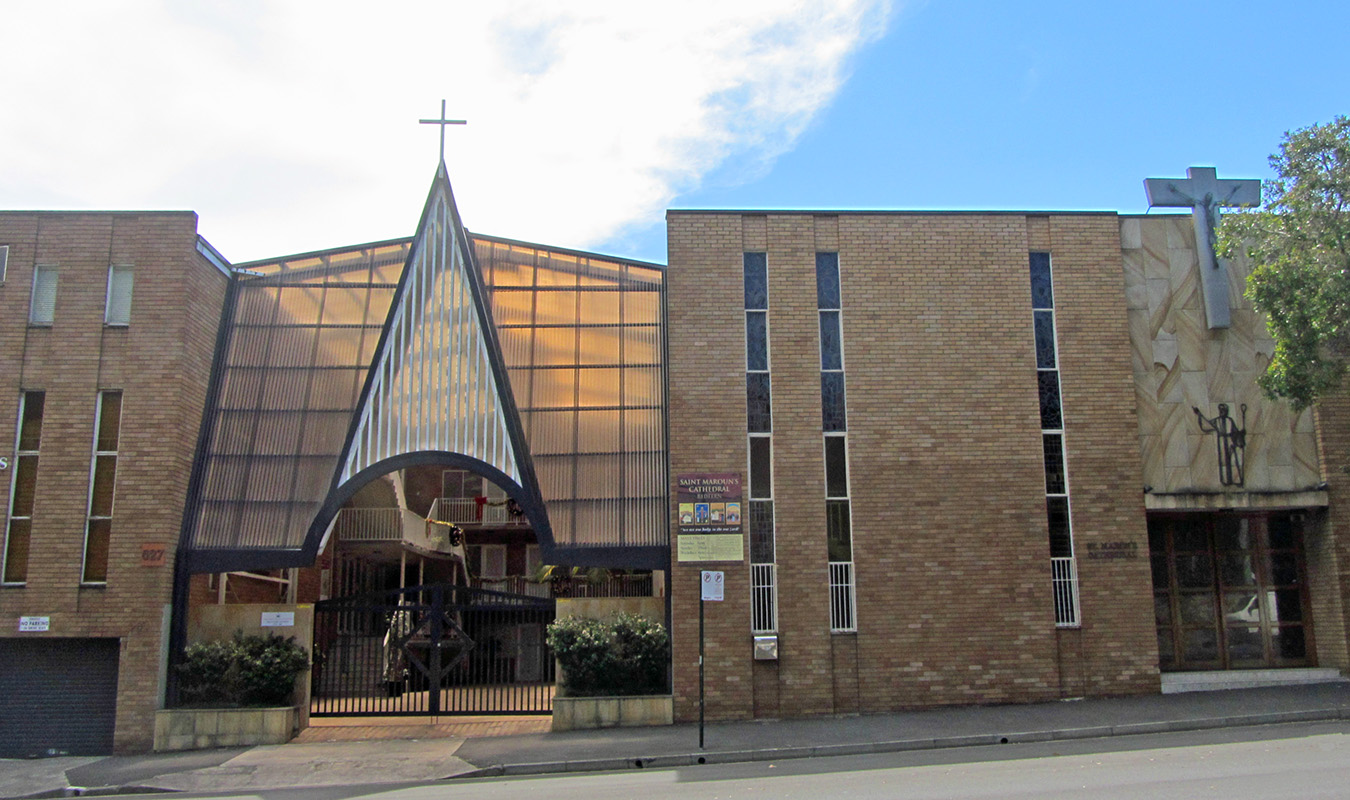
- St. Maroun's Cathedral, Sydney in 2012
- St. Maroun's Cathedral
- 33°53′33″S 151°12′26″E
- Location: 627 Elizabeth Street, Redfern, Sydney, New South Wales
- Country: Australia
- Denomination: Eastern Catholic Church
- Tradition: Maronite rite (Antiochian)
- Website: maronitecathedralredfern.org.au

History
- Status: Church (1897 – 1973); Cathedral (since 1973)
- Founded: c. 1896 (as a church); October 1973 (as a cathedral)
- Founders: Frs Yazbeck and Dahdah (c. 1896); Archbishop Abdo Khalife (1973)
- Dedication: Saint Maroun
- Dedicated: 10 January 1897

Architecture
- Functional status: Complete
- Architectural type: Church

Administration
- Archdiocese: Sydney (Roman Catholic)
- Diocese: Sydney Eparchy
- Parish: St Maroun's Cathedral

Clergy
- Bishop(s): Antoine-Charbel Tarabay, OLM
- Dean: Fr Geoffrey Abdallah

St. Maroun's Cathedral, also called St Maron's Cathedral, is a Maronite rite Eastern Catholic Church cathedral and church, located in the suburb of Redfern, in Sydney, New South Wales, Australia.

St. Maroun's Cathedral is the main church of the Maronite Catholic Eparchy of Saint Maron of Sydney (Eparchia Sancti Maronis Sydneyensis Maronitarum). Saint Maroun's was first established on 10 January 1897. The Eparchy, itself, was created by Pope Paul VI later in 1973 through the papal bull, Illo fretis Concilii. The administration of the Eparchy is overseen by the Roman Catholic Archdiocese of Sydney.

The first Maronite priests to arrive in Sydney were Father Abdallah Yazbek and Father Joseph Dahdah, arriving on 8 May 1893. The then Catholic Archbishop of Sydney Cardinal Moran permitted them to initially celebrate mass at Saint Vincent De Paul located on Redfern Street in Redfern and Our Lady of Mount Carmel located on Kellick Street in Waterloo.

Saint Maroun's Cathedral is the seat of current Epoch Antoine-Charbel Tarabay, OLM.

Religious services at Saint Maroun's Cathedral are delivered in English and Arabic, as well as the liturgical language of the Maronite Church, being ancient Syro-Aramaic.

== History ==
=== Roots ===
The Maronites trace their beginnings to Saint Maroun (also called St Maron) who led a monastic life in the fourth century in Syria. Maronite clergy preached the Christian gospel in the mountains of North Lebanon where the Maronite Christian community grew. The Maronite diaspora has since spread to many countries throughout the world, including Australia.

Lebanese migration to Australia first took place in around the early 1800s.

The first Maronite priests to arrive in Sydney were Father Abdallah Yazbek and Father Joseph Dahdah, arriving on 8 May 1893 to serve the growing Maronite community in Australia. The then Catholic Archbishop of Sydney Cardinal Moran permitted them to initially celebrate mass at Saint Vincent De Paul in Redfern and Our Lady of Mount Carmel in Waterloo.

In 1894, the Maronite community, with the encouragement of Father Yazbek and Father Dahdah, leased the top floor of a premises in Raglin Street, Waterloo for approximately 2 years and this was used for church services, and as a meeting place for the growing Maronite community in and around Redfern.

=== First building ===
In 1895, the premises at 621 Elizabeth Street, Redfern, NSW, 2016 was purchased for 600 pounds. The construction of the original Saint Maroun's Church commenced in about 1896 and was completed in early 1897. Saint Maroun's Church was officially consecrated and opened on 10 January 1897, with the Catholic Archbishop of Sydney, Cardinal Patrick Moran, celebrating mass along with Father Yazbek and Father Dahdah.

The original Church consisted of rendered lime brick construction with the exterior painted a light grey color. The Church also featured a small bell-tower which sat on top of the front entrance or archway.

Saint Maroun's Cathedral was initially known as "Saint Maroun's Church" rather than "Saint Maroun's Cathedral". Saint Maroun's was initially a church and not the seat of a bishop. The first Maronite Bishop of Australia was elected in 1973 with the establishment, through the papal bull, Illo fretis Concilii, of the Eparchy of Saint Maroun. Accordingly, "Saint Maroun's Church" officially became "Saint Maroun's Cathedral" from 25 June 1973 with the appointment of Bishop Ignace Abdo Khalife as the first Maronite Bishop for the Eparchy.

=== Current site and church ===
In 1963, Father Peter Ziade (later Monsignor Ziade) was commissioned by then Maronite Patriarch Nasrallah Boutros Sfeir to travel to Sydney, Australia as the new parish priest for the Maronite community. Father Ziade left Lebanon on 10 September 1963 and arrived in Sydney on 11 September 1963 to begin his tenure, replacing Father Chuchrallah Harb.

The Maronite community in Australia (particularly in Sydney) continued to grow from the early migration wave which had begun in about the early 1800s. The community had experienced a plateau in migration with the introduction of the White Australia Policy which came into force in the early 1900s, however this was relaxed in the 1920s. The Maronite community grew from an estimated 5,000 members in about 1950 to around 25,000 by 1970.

Given their growing number, there was a need within the community for the expansion of pastoral care and church space. Father Ziade, reflecting on the construction of the new Saint Maroun's church, and the size of the original Saint Maroun's Church, described the situation as follows: "The former little church was so small there was no place for everybody to sit so some stood outside under the rain in winter and in sunshine in the summer."

In 1965, the Maronite community of Sydney raised funds for the purchase of the adjacent property at 627 Elizabeth Street, Redfern, NSW 2016 (which was then used as an auto-repair shop) in the hope of establishing a new larger church to meet the needs of the Maronite community.

The then-Catholic Archbishop of Sydney Cardinal Gilroy and Father Ziade celebrated Holy Mass and laid the foundation stone for the new church on 1 March 1964 on the south side of the corner of the (then-vacant) land located at 627 Elizabeth Street, Redfern, NSW, 2016. Construction of the new Saint Maroun's Church at 627 Elizabeth Street, Redfern was completed in about April 1965.

The official opening and consecration of the new Saint Maroun's Church took place on 2 May 1965. Then Archbishop of Sydney Cardinal Gilroy and Father Ziade presided over the mass.

The current Saint Maroun's Cathedral stands on the site of the former auto-repair shop, with the current Saint Maroun's Church Hall now standing on the site of the original church built in 1897.

== Current status ==
The parish of Saint Maroun's now comprises three locations at which church services are conducted for members of the Maronite community as follows:

1. Saint Maroun's Cathedral at Redfern, Sunday Mass at 10AM in Arabic and English;
2. Saint Maroun's College at Dulwich Hill, Sunday Mass at 8:30AM in Arabic;
3. Our Lady of Lourdes Church at Earlwood, Sunday Mass at 5:30PM Family Mass.

The current parish ministry team is made up of:

1. Father Maroun Elkazzi, Parish Administrator and Priest;
2. Father Geoffrey Abdallah, Dean of the Cathedral and Priest;
3. Father Ron Hassarati, Assistant Priest;
4. Father Bernard Assi, Assistant Priest.

Saint Maroun's Cathedral Redfern remains the main church of the Maronite Catholic Eparchy of Saint Maron of Sydney.

== Historic documents ==
Handwritten Letter in Arabic by Fr. Abdallah Yazbek

The document depicted is a significant historical document in the history of the Maronite Church in Australia. It is a handwritten letter by Father Abdallah Yazbek who, along with Father Joseph Dahdah, were the first Maronite priests to arrive in Australia, arriving in Sydney on 8 May 1893.

The letter is handwritten in Arabic and recounts Father Yazbek's travels and journey from Lebanon to Australia and his arrival, along with Father Dahdah, in Sydney, Australia in 1893.

English Translation of Letter by Fr. Abdallah Yazbek 1897

The document is the English translation of Father Yazbek's letter recounting his journey from Lebanon to Australia and the purchase and building of the first Maronite Church in Australia in 1897, being Saint Maroun's Redfern.

The letter also recounts the early struggles of the priests as they sought to establish a place of worship for their community in Sydney. It refers to the use of the property in Raglan Street, Redfern, as well as the use of the churches of Saint Vincent's, Redfern and Our Lady of Mount Carmel, Waterloo.

The letter is dated and signed 10 January 1897 very shortly after the church was purchased and built.

Extracts from the (translated) text of the letter are set out below:

Title: How I arrived to Australia and the time I spent during the time of His Beatitude, Holiness, Eminense, Youhanna Boutros El Hajj, Patriarch of Antioch and All the East

Extracts from Text:

"His Grace Bishop Elias El Houaik, Patriarchal Vicar, and currently enjoying the See of Antioch, asked me whether I would like to travel to Australia, to serve the Maronite parishoners, on 25 December 1892...I advised him of my acceptance...He then advised me that there are two priests, Father Boulos Mattar from Lahfd and Father Youssef El Dahdah, and asked me which one of them I would like to have with me. I asked for Father Youssef El Dahdah...Subsequently we went to Beirut and from there to Port Saed..."

...

"When we arrived to Sydney on 8 May 1893, we were received at the Port by members of the Maronite Parish. That same day one of them went with us for interpreting, he is Antisfalous Morad, to meet His Beaitude Bishop Youssef Higgins. We presented him with the delegations and publications which we have from his Eminence, clarifying his intention and the permission from the Congregation for the Evangalisation of People...We provided His Beatitude, Cardinal Moran, with the letter... [Cardinal Moran] authorised us to celebrate Mass, and delegated us to hold the Religious Obligations for our Maronite people on Sunday at Saint Vincent in Redfern, and on Saturday at Mount Carmel...We continued for more than one year and until we leased a place in Raglin Street Waterloo, pursuant to a decree from His Eminence. We used the top floor as a temporary church, where we celebrated the Eucharist and religious obligations, it was consecrated by a decree from His Grace Bishop Higgins. We remained in it for approximately three years. During that period...the Cardinal gave us the required permission to...collect donations from the faithful, in order to build a Church and subsequently to purchase a place to build a Church...When the Church was built, His Eminence the Cardinal consecrated it on 10 January 1897."

Purchase Deed for Saint Maroun's Original Church

The document is the original handwritten purchase deed and bank loan from the London Bank of Australia located at Pitt and Market Streets, Sydney.

The document is dated 20 January 1897 and names Reverend A. Yazbek (Father Abdallah Yazbek) and Reverend Joseph Dahdah (Father Youssef Dahdah) as the named borrowers. The bank representative is named as Mr. T. M. Slattery.

The document records the purchase price and other fees towards the purchase of the original Saint Maroun's Church located at 621 Elizabeth Street, Redfern, NSW, 2016.

The document also records payments made towards the loan by both Father Yazbek and Father Dahdah from funds raised by the Maronite congregation.

The document is held in the archive of Saint Maroun's Redfern.

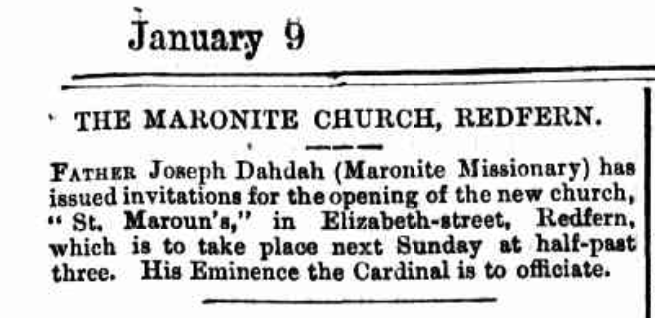
Freemans Journal Opening of St Maroun 1897

The document is a notice/invitation that was published in The Freeman's Journal on 9 January 1897 issuing an open invitation to the opening of the new Church of Saint Maroun's on Sunday, 10 January 1897.

Full Page of The Freeman's Journal Containing Invitation

The notice which appears at the top left corner of page 15 of The Freeman's Journal edition published on Saturday, 9 January 1897 reads as follows:

"The Maronite church, Redfern.

Father Joseph Dahdah (Maronite Missionary) has issued invitations for the opening of the new church, "St. Maroun's," in Elizabeth-street, Redfern, which is to take place next Sunday at half-past three. His Eminence the Cardinal is to officiate."

The reference to "His Eminence the Cardinal" is a reference to the then-Archbishop of Sydney Cardinal Patrick Moran who consecrated the church and celebrated mass along with Father Yazbek and Father El Dahdah on Sunday, 18 January 1897.

The Freeman's Journal was a newspaper founded in 1850 by William Lane an served Sydney's Catholic community for news, opinion and analysis and covered local, national and international events.

== Redfern Park Commemorative Plaque ==
Redfern, Sydney is an integral part of the Maronite (and wider Lebanese) history of emigration to Australia. The location of various factories and cheap housing attracted various migrant communities, including Lebanese migrants to Australia. Saint Maroun's Redfern was a central hub for the Maronite Lebanese community. The close by Redfern Park was also a central meeting point for all communities, including the Lebanese Maronites.

The City of Sydney Council (within which Redfern falls at a Local Government level) has installed a sign and bronzed monumental plaque in the North-Eastern corner of Redfern Park commemorating the presence of early Lebanese settlers in the area and which also references Saint Maroun's Church. The sign is located at the Park's entrance on the corner of Elizabeth and Redfern Streets. The plaque is located on the corner of the park that is closest in proximity to Saint Maroun's Church. The plaque and sign feature a photograph of long serving New South Wales Labor politician Alexander “Alec” Alam (an Australian-born child of Lebanese migrants) and a group of people in front of old St Maroun's Church after a meeting of the Lebanese Maronite Society in 1934.

The plaque pays tribute to the presence of Lebanese migrants in and around the area of Redfern.

== Bishops and eparchy ==
From 1973 Saint Maroun's has been designated a cathedral. A cathedral is a church that contains the cathedra (Greek for 'seat') of a bishop, thus serving as the central church of a diocese or (as in this case) an eparchy.

The following persons have been elected as Bishop of the Eparchy of Saint Maroun's and thus were the official head of Saint Maroun's Cathedral for the duration of their respective tenure:

1. Ignace Abdo Khalife (from 25 June 1973 to 23 November 1990);
2. Joseph Habib Hitti (from 23 November 1990 until 26 October 2001);
3. Ad Abi Karam (from 26 October 2001 to 17 April 2013); and
4. Antoine-Charbel Tarabay (from 17 April 2013 to present).

== Current premises ==
The current Saint Maroun's Cathedral was designed by architect William Atkinson. Prior to the commencement of building works, a notice was issued by Father Ziade inviting architects to tender their architectural designs for the building of the new church. Nine (9) architects submitted proposals and designs for the new building and enviros. Father Ziade submitted all design proposals to the then Archbishop of Sydney Cardinal Gilroy, who in turn referred the proposals to a special committee for church buildings who deliberated over the designs and ultimately selected the architectural plans and proposal that was submitted by Mr Atkinson. Mr Atkinson was admitted as a member of the Royal Australian Institute of Architects in 1954 and lived at the time in nearby Maroubra.

The construction and design of the building is typical of the style of building then present in Sydney, Australia in the late 1960s and early 1970s. The style of building at the time often featured red and blonde brick, robust double-brick construction, simple functional layouts, and integration with the emerging "Sydney School" regionalist approach, blending solid, low-maintenance materials with some modernist influences, resulting in durable construction.

The Saint Maroun's Cathedral building is constructed using blonde or yellow coloured brickwork. The brickwork comprises a double-brick construction with the colours of the bricks giving both the exterior and the interior a distinctive warm, pale color throughout. The use of this particular type of brickwork, as was common in the 1970s, gives the building features a range of natural variations in shade, creating a "tapestry look" that was popular at the time. Similarly, the construction work has a simple yet functional layouts which sought to utilise every part of the available land space, and as such the exterior walls of the building are largely constructed on the perimeter of the parcel of land.

The entry to the church faces East and consists of a large entryway with large wooden doors which leads into a vestibule or foyer area. The vestibule or foyer area leads immediately to the main church interior which is separated from the vestibule by a further set of glass and wood-panel doors. The vestibule serves as a transitional space between the outdoor area and the building's interior. The vestibule also allows access to two staircases which both lead up to the mezzanine level which provides for additional seating as well as an area dedicated to the cathedral's choir.

The interior of the church can accommodate up to approximately 700 people with traditional church bench seating throughout.

The central features of the main altar include:

1. The large almost-life-size crucifix of Jesus on the cross which is positioned centrally above the main altar.
2. A large golden emblem depicting the Holy Spirit and the associated symbol of fire (located below the main crucifix).
3. A large painting of Saint Maroun portrayed in a black monastic habit with a hanging stole, accompanied by two other monks who are depicted kneeling beside Saint Maroun.

In addition to the main altar, there are two smaller altars on the southern and northern sides of the main altar. The two smaller altars are dedicated to Saint Joseph and the Virgin Mary and each respective smaller altar contains a statue of each. In addition, the Virgin Mary altar also contains depictions of Maronite saints, Saint Charbel (monk/priest), Saint Rafqa (nun/mystic), and Saint Nimatullah Hardini (monk/priest).

Saint Maroun's Cathedral also contains a number of large floor to ceiling glass panels designed to maximize the incursion of light into the church's interior. These large elongated glass panels contain depictions of various Maronite, as well as Catholic, saints and religious figures. Many of the panels contain depictions of saints or other significant religious figures from Maronite history or Lebanese history. The depictions are stained glass depictions of those saints/figures and are glass art decorative designs with Christian religious symbols, colorful geometric patterns and floral motifs.

In addition to the Cathedral building, the other parts of the complex include:

1. an Alfresco Area that connects the main Cathedral building and is used by the congregation to gather before, during and after mass.
2. the Saint Maroun's Cathedral Hall which is used by the congregation and others for functions, assemblies and other meetings.
3. the administrative building and related office and other spaces.

The Alfresco Area consists of a courtyard shelter and belltower and features a large life-size statue of Saint Maroun who is again portrayed in his customary monastic habit with a hanging stole. The statue also features Saint Maroun holding in his left hand a shepherd's staff or crozier which is adorned with a cross on top. The shepherd's staff or crozier emphasises Saint Maroun's significance to the Maronites and symbolizes his role as a guiding, protecting, and managing shepherd over his church. The belltower and courtyard shelter area were constructed in 1995 and officially opened and blessed by then Maronite Bishop Joseph Hitti on 12 February 1995. In addition to the statue of Saint Maroun in the Alfresco Area, there are other pictures and depictions of Maronite Saints within that covered area.

The Alfresco Area links the main Cathedral/Church building (located at 621 Elizabeth Street, Redfern, NSW, 2016) with the Saint Maroun's Hall and administrative building (located on the adjoining lot, being 627 Elizabeth Street, Redfern, NSW, 2016).

== Gallery ==
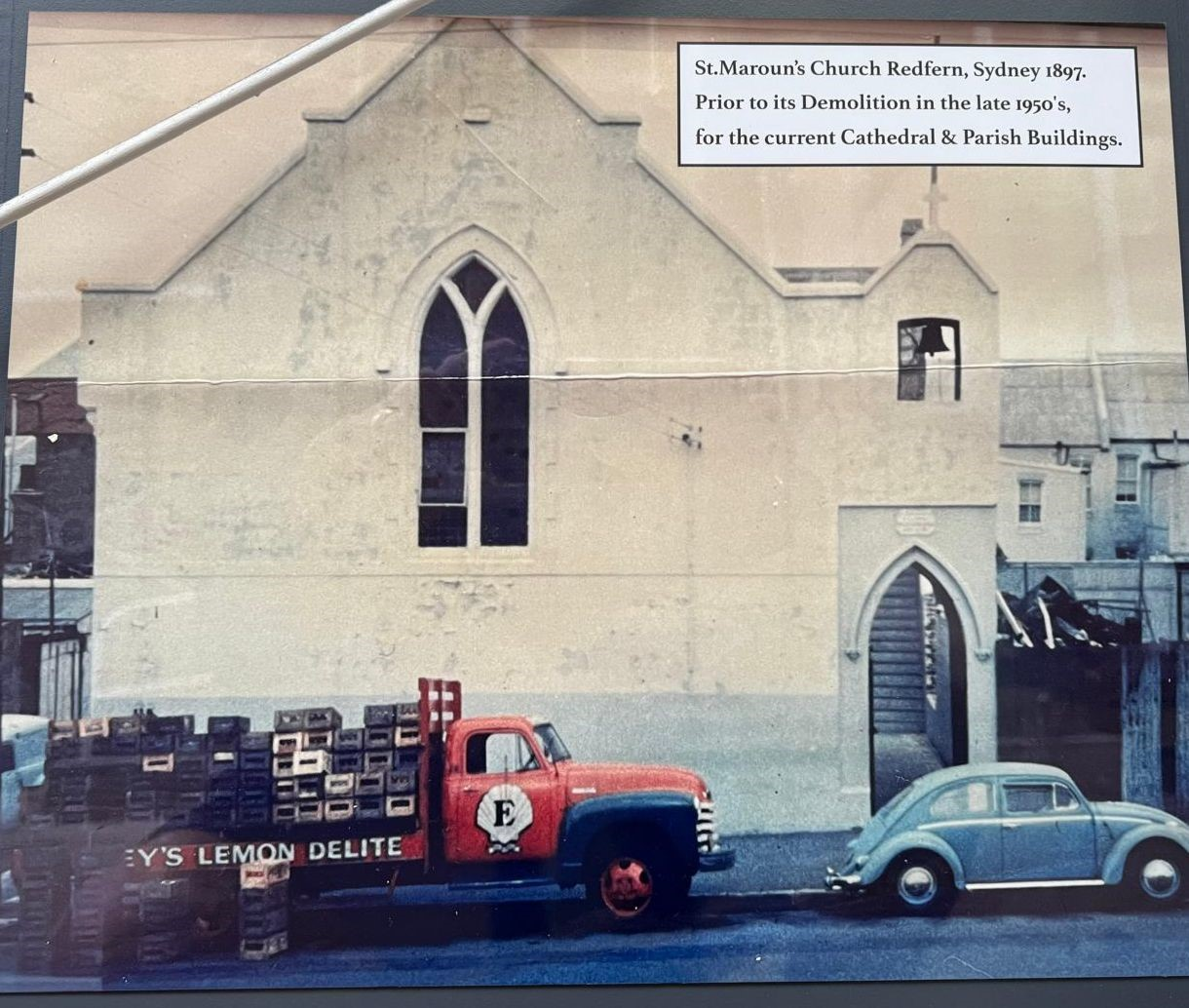
Original Saint Maroun's, built 1897

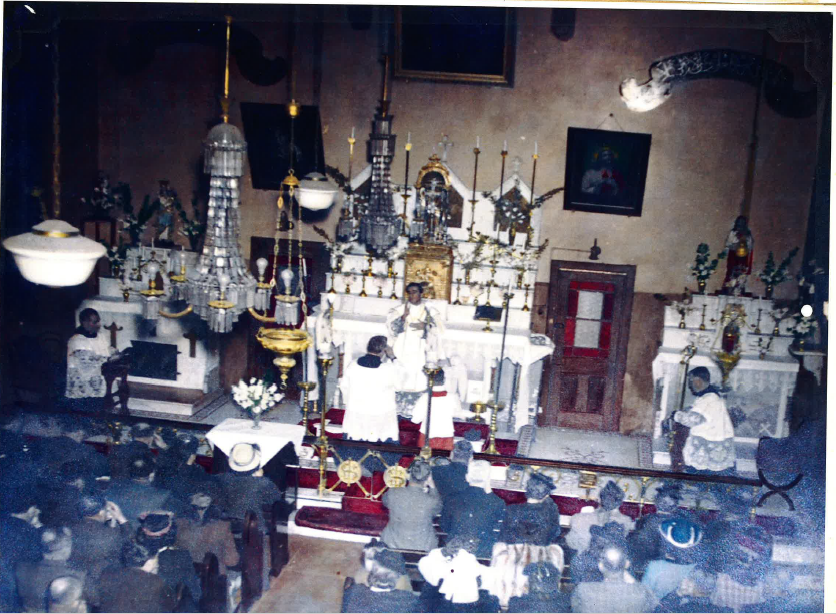
Interior of the first building, 1947

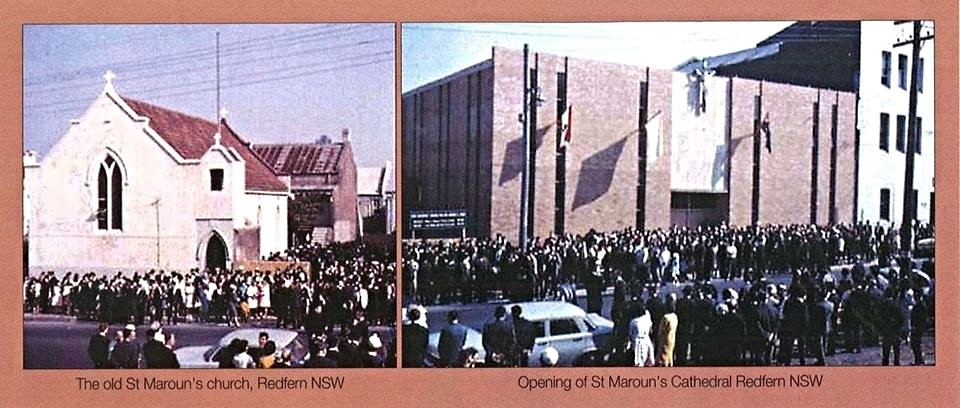
Original and new buildings

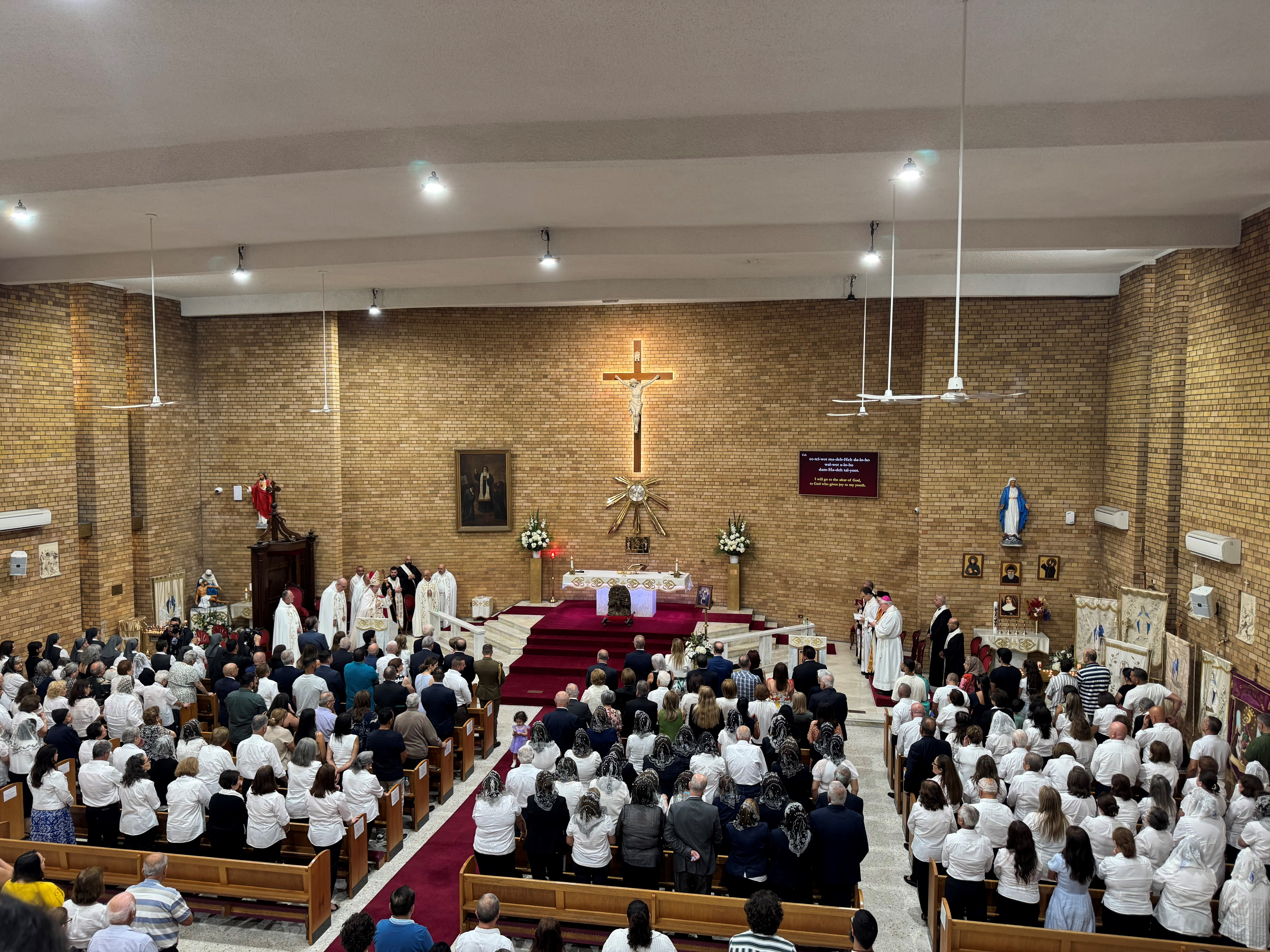
Saint Maroun Interior View

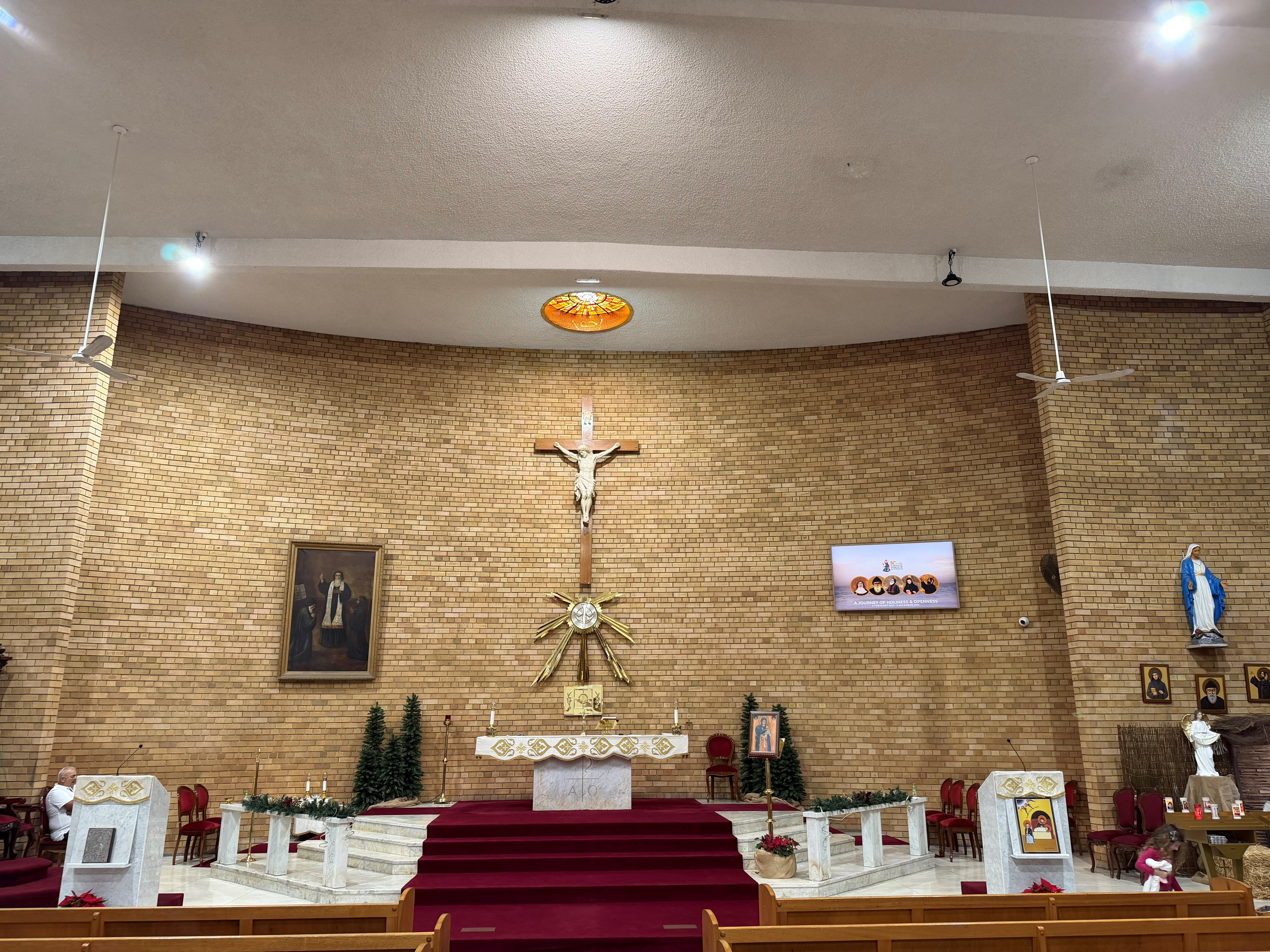
Saint Maroun Interior View Altar

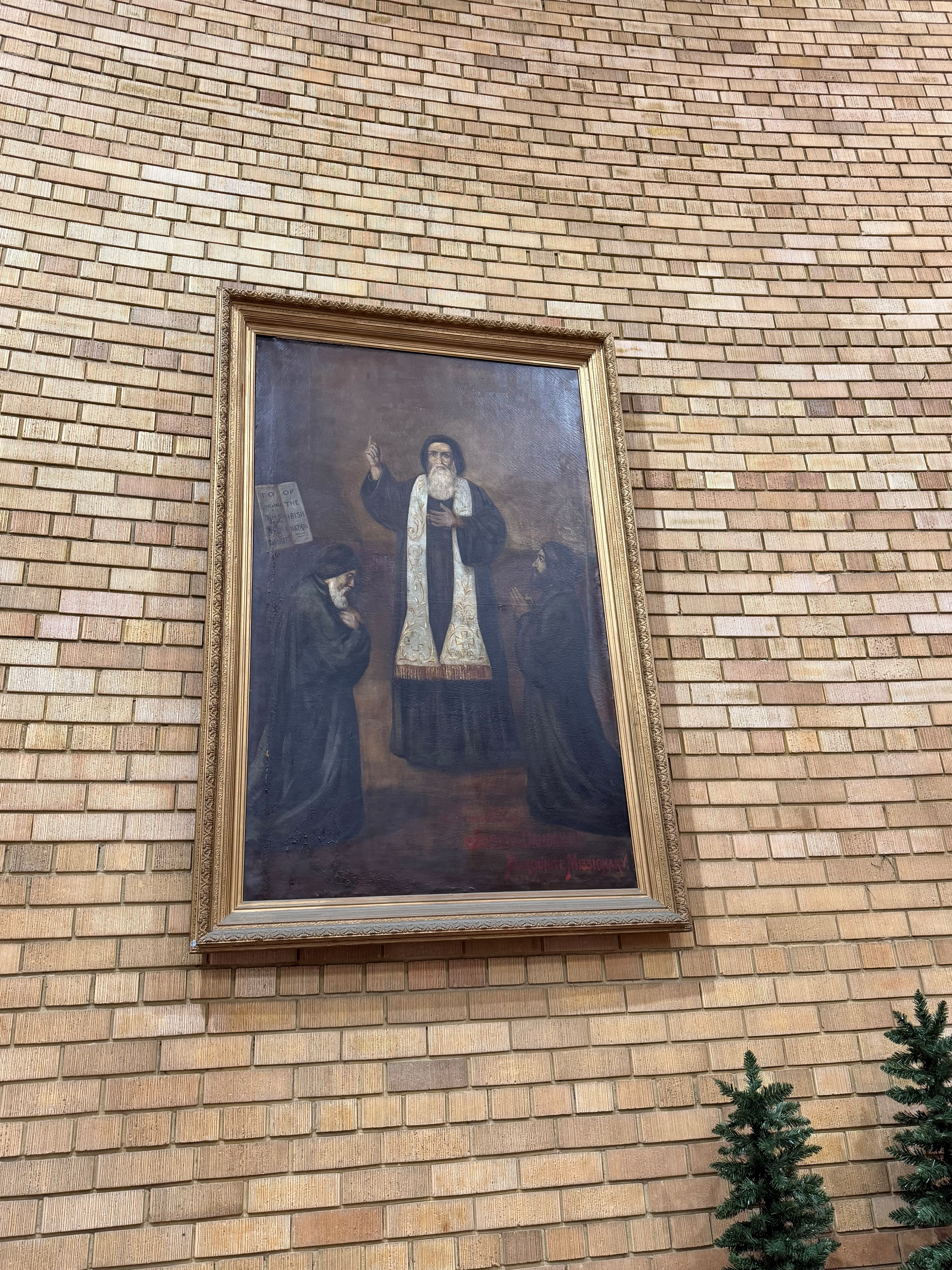
Saint Maroun Interior Painting

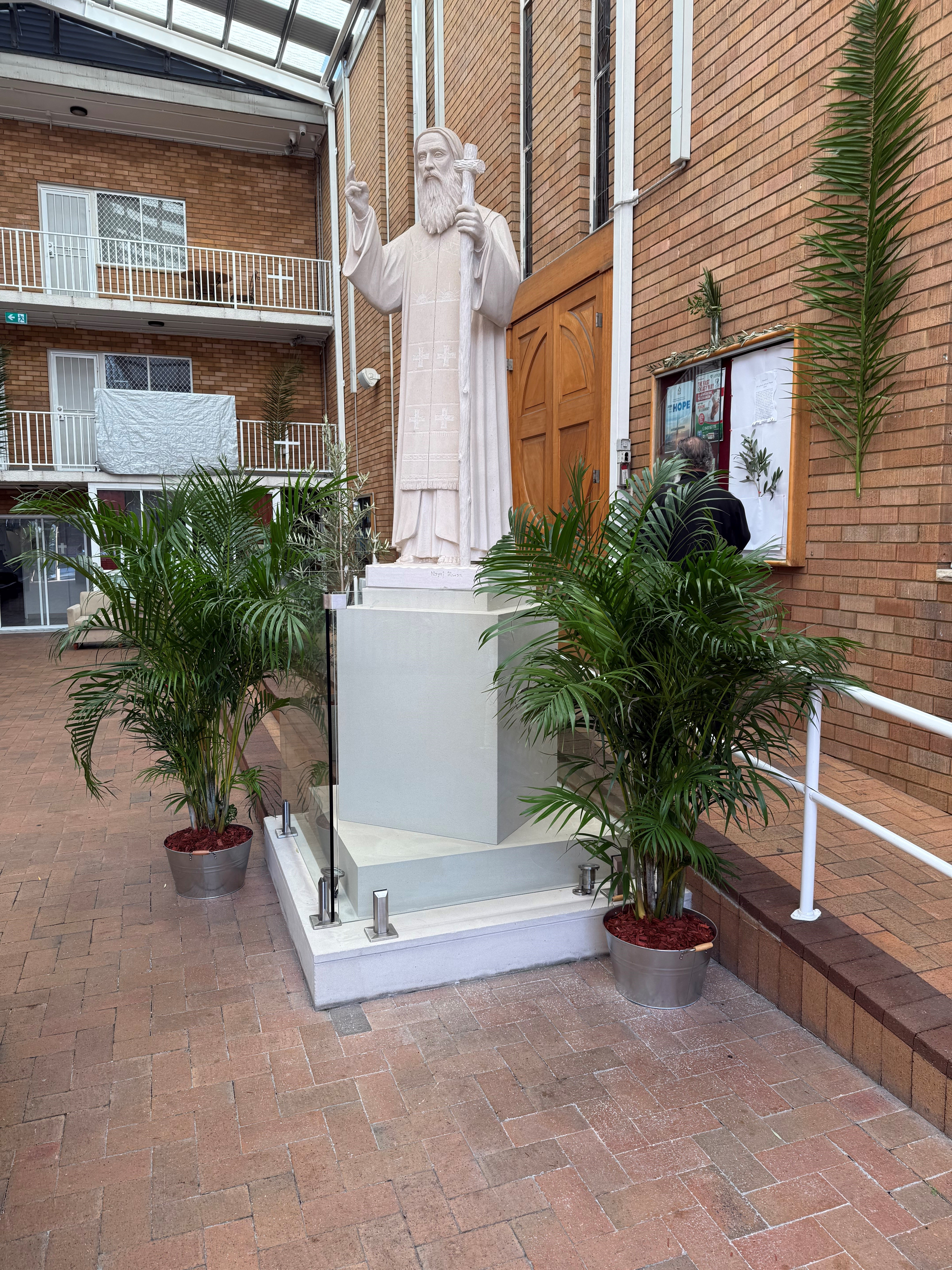
Saint Maroun Exterior Statute

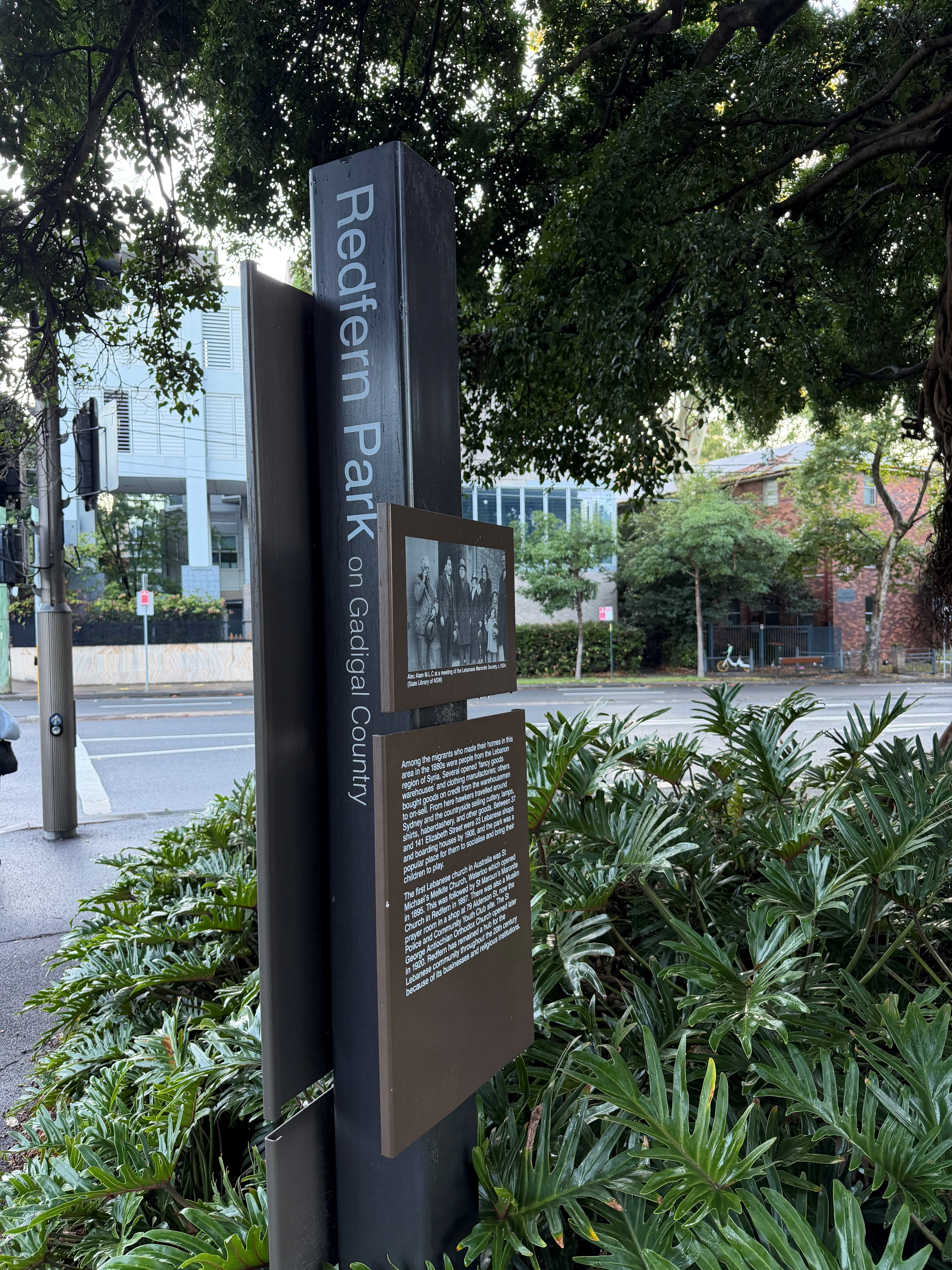
Location of Redfern Park plaque, near the church building

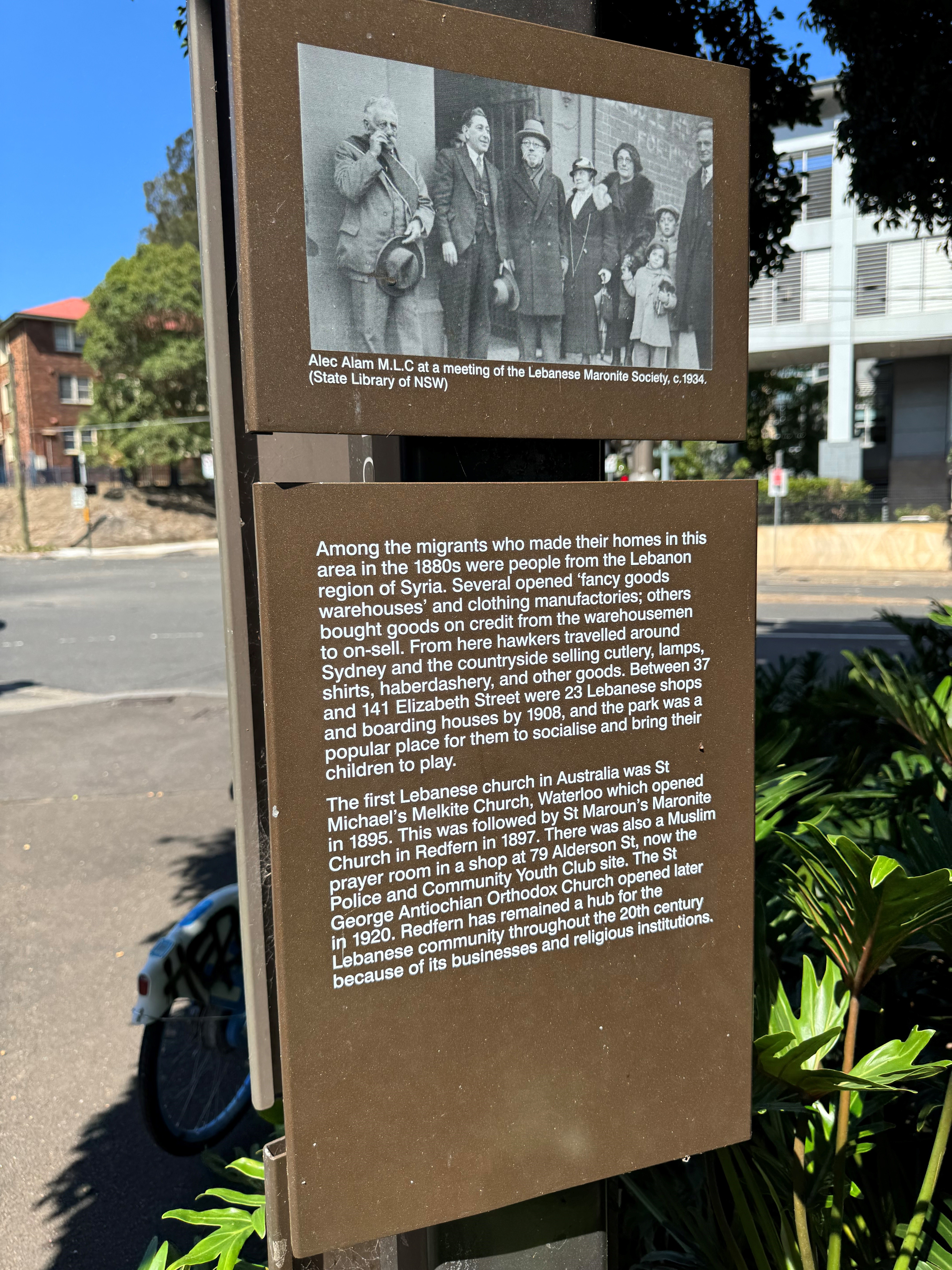
Closeup of the plaque

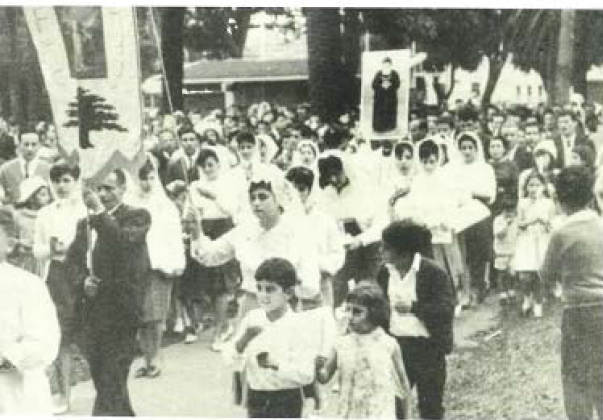
Maronite mass and procession Redfern Park; the banners depict the cedar tree of Lebanon and a Maronite religious figure

== See also ==
- Catholicism in Australia
- St. Maron
