= Ad Abi Karam =

Lebanese Australian Maronite Catholic bishop

- Eparch Emeritus of Saint Maron of Sydney
- Native name: الى ابى كرم
- Church: Maronite Church
- Diocese: Eparchy of Saint Maron of Sydney
- In office: 26 October 2001 – 17 April 2013
- Predecessor: Joseph Hitti
- Successor: Antoine-Charbel Tarabay

Orders
- Ordination: 25 March 1962
- Consecration: 12 January 2002 by Nasrallah Boutros Sfeir

Personal details
- Born: 28 March 1937 (age 89) Cornet Chahwan, Mandatory Lebanese Republic, French Empire

Ad Abi Karam (born 28 March 1937 in Kornet Chehwan, Matn District, Lebanon) is a retired Lebanese Australian Maronite Catholic bishop of the Maronite Catholic Eparchy of Saint Maron of Sydney.

== Life ==
Ordained to the priesthood on 25 March 1962, Karam was appointed on 26 October 2001 bishop by Pope John Paul II of the Maronite Eparchy of Saint Maron of Sydney, Australia. Maronite Patriarch of Antioch, Cardinal Nasrallah Boutros Sfeir, on January 12, 2002, ordained him bishop and his co-consecrators were Roland Aboujaoudé, auxiliary bishop of Antioch, and Samir Mazloum, Curial Bishop of Antioch. He was installed as bishop on February 8, 2002.

Karam had his age-related renounce of his office on 17 April 2013 accepted by Pope Francis.
