= Warriewood Wetlands =

- other
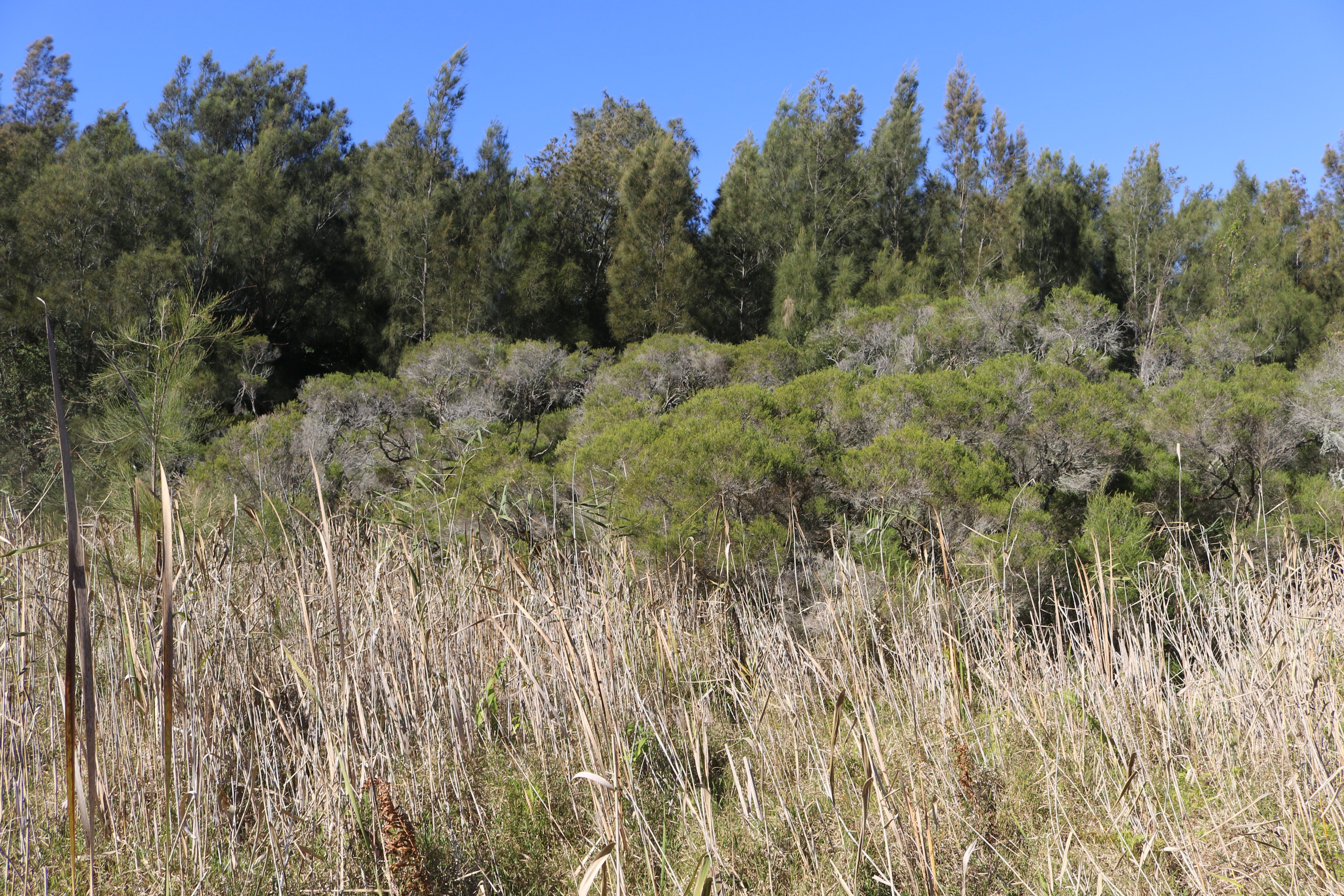
- swamp oak & paperbark at Warriewood

- Coordinates: 33°41′35″S 151°17′33″E
- Country: Australia
- State: New South Wales
- Website: Warriewood Wetlands

Warriewood Wetlands is located in suburban Warriewood, 20 km (12 mi) from the centre of Sydney, Australia. The reserve consists of 26 hectares (64 acres) with several Endangered Ecological Communities with various habitats for indigenous animals. Many species of birds have been recorded, including rarely seen species in Sydney.

== Geography ==
Warriewood Wetlands is the largest sand plain wetland in northern Sydney. The average annual rainfall is 1,180 mm (46 in) at nearby Long Reef.

== History ==
The local indigenous Australian people of the Northern Beaches were the Garigal people of the Guringai, part of the Gamilaraay nation.

== Recreation ==
Warriewood Wetlands has several access points and a 2.4 kilometre long walking track, suited to running and walking. Birdwatching is a popular activity, particularly when the swamp mahogany is flowering.

== Flora ==
Indigenous flora includes swamp oak, swamp mahogany, swamp paperbark, common reed, bulrush, swamp water fern, and monkey rope vine.

== Fauna ==
Ring-tail possums, brushtail possums and grey-headed flying foxes, red-bellied black snakes, and Australian water dragons are common. Birds are commonly seen, such as Pacific black duck, chestnut teal, Australasian swamphen, brushturkeys, rainbow lorikeets, Australian king parrots, crimson rosellas, currawongs, owlet-nightjar, koel, tawny frogmouth, and pacific baza.

== Bush regeneration ==
Conservation work is in progress.
