= John Ducker =

Australian politician (1932–2005)

The Honourable John Ducker AO

Member of the Legislative Council of New South Wales
- In office 29 February 1972 – 5 September 1979

President, Labor Party (New South Wales)
- In office 1972–1979
- Succeeded by: Paul Keating

Personal details
- Born: 29 March 1932 Kingston upon Hull, England
- Died: 25 November 2005 (aged 73) Sydney, Australia
- Party: Labor Party
- Spouse: Valerie Ducker
- Children: 2 (male), 1 (female)
- Occupation: Union organiser

John Patrick Ducker AO (29 March 1932 – 25 November 2005), Australian labour leader and politician, played a leading role in the Australian labour movement and the Labor Party for 20 years.

== Background ==
Ducker was born in Kingston upon Hull, in northern England, the son of a bus driver, and worked on the docks from the age of 14. He migrated to Australia with his family in 1950, and became an ironworker and active in the Federated Ironworkers Association, at that time controlled by the Communist Party of Australia. He was originally the minutes secretary in 1952, becoming an organiser from the Sydney branch from 1952-1959. He joined the Labor party in 1952.

Ducker, a convert to Catholicism, was a strong anti-Communist and became a supporter of B. A. Santamaria's Industrial Groups, which campaigned successfully to overturn the Communist control of the union.

== Career ==
=== New South Wales Labor Council ===
From 1952, Ducker was an official of the union under the new anti-Communist leader, Laurie Short (a non-Catholic). When the Labor Party split in 1955, Ducker did not follow many of his colleagues into the Democratic Labor Party, but remained in the Labor Party, becoming a leading figure in the party's right wing. His North English accent led to him becoming known as "bruvver Ducker".

In 1961, Ducker moved from the Ironworkers to become an organiser for the Labor Council of New South Wales, becoming first an organiser and in 1967 becoming assistant secretary. In 1972, he was appointed a member of the New South Wales Legislative Council. He was also president of the New South Wales Labor Party and vice-president of the Australian Council of Trade Unions. In these positions he supported successive New South Wales Labor leaders such as Pat Hills, Neville Wran and Barrie Unsworth (also a Catholic convert). In 1973, he organised Wran's pre-selection for a safe Liberal Assembly Seat, allowing him to defeat Hills months later and become Leader of the party.

=== Federal Labor involvement ===
Ducker was also a powerful supporter of Federal Labor Leader Gough Whitlam. In 1970, Ducker was a leading figure in the internal crisis in the Labor Party that cemented Whitlam's leadership. Convinced of the need to remove the left-wing controllers of the Victorian branch of the party if Labor was to win the 1972 federal election, Ducker did a deal with the left-wing leader Clyde Cameron, under which the right shared power with the left in the New South Wales branch in exchange for Cameron's support for the reform of the Victorian branch.

According to historian C. J. Coventry, Ducker was a "prolific informer" for the United States of America throughout the 1970s, providing inside-information about the Labor Party and the ACTU. During this time Ducker secretly helped the United States resolve industrial disputes. For example, when Frank Sinatra insulted women journalists, causing a nationwide boycott of the singer, Ducker worked with the Ambassador and ACTU President Bob Hawke to bring about a quick resolution.

=== After politics ===
He had a long association with Mater Maria Catholic College.

In 1979, Ducker's health declined and he resigned all his official positions, but Wran appointed him chairman of the New South Wales Public Service Board. He remained a powerful influence behind the scenes, supporting younger Labor leaders such as Graham Richardson, Bob Carr and Paul Keating. He was made an Officer of the Order of Australia in 1979, and the Catholic Church awarded him a Papal knighthood. He was also appointed to several company boards, including Qantas and the poker machine giant Aristocrat Leisure Industries.

Ducker was appointed as the NSW chair of the Duke of Edinburgh's Award – Australia and a national board director (1998-2000).

== Personal life ==
Outside of his career, Duke enjoyed gardening, reading and music.

Ducker married Valerie Elizabeth Smith in 1963, and they had two sons and one daughter. Ducker died at the age of 73 on 25 February 2005. Valerie Ducker died in 2022.

Trade union offices
Preceded by Ralph Marsh	Secretary of the Labor Council of New South Wales; 1975–1979	Succeeded by Barrie Unsworth
