= Our Lady of the Rosary Cathedral, Waitara =

Cathedral church of the Roman Catholic Diocese of Broken Bay

Our Lady of the Rosary Cathedral
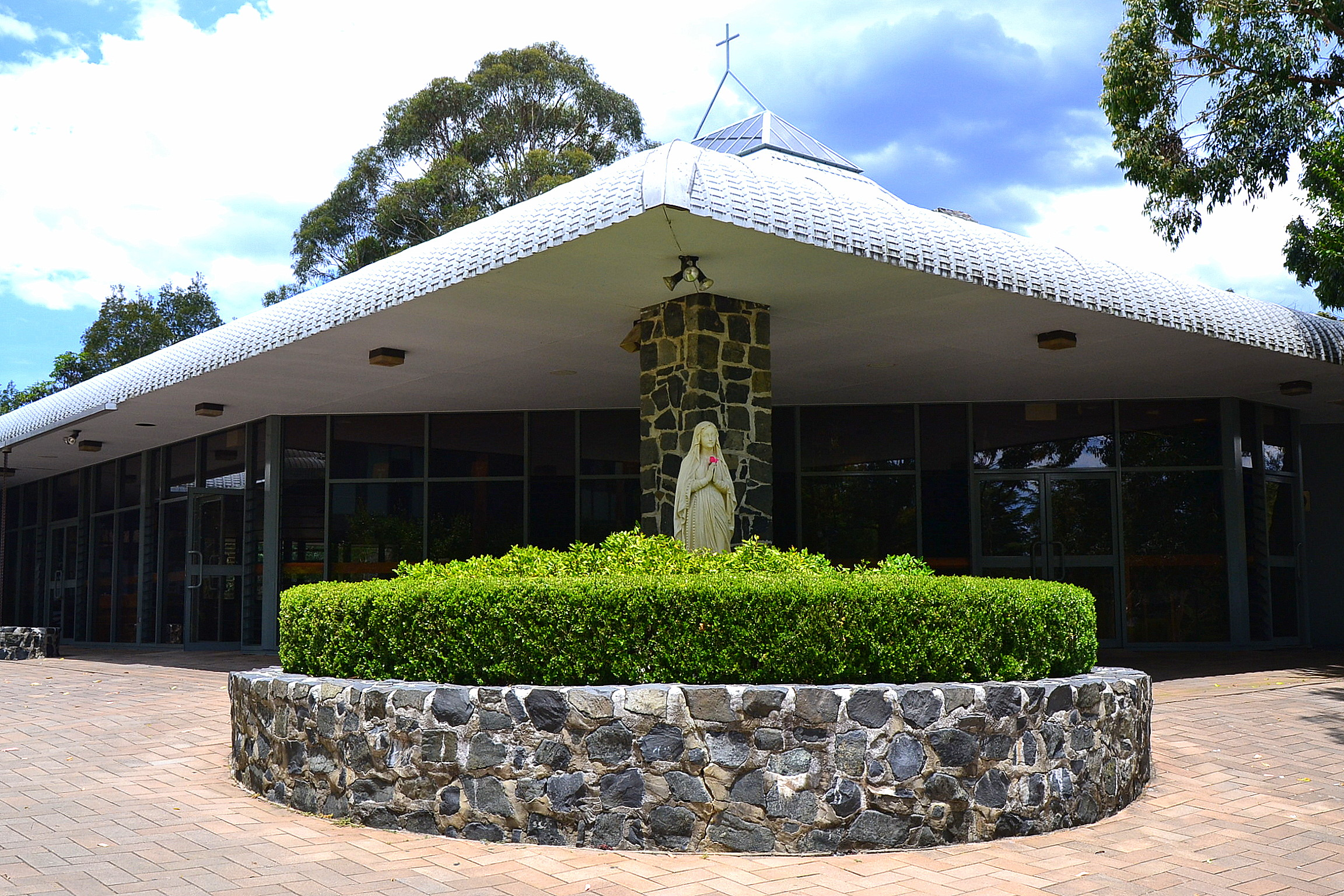
- Our Lady of the Rosary Cathedral
- Our Lady of the Rosary Cathedral
- 33°42′49″S 151°06′15″E
- Address: 23 Yardley Avenue, Waitara, Sydney, New South Wales
- Country: Australia
- Denomination: Roman Catholic
- Website: bbcatholic.org.au/hornsby

History
- Status: Cathedral
- Founded: 22 November 1908 (as a church); 25 August 1991 (as a cathedral)
- Founders: Cardinal Francis Moran (1908); Rev. Patrick Murphy (1991)
- Dedication: Mary, the mother of Jesus
- Consecrated: 10 February 2008 (as a cathedral)

Architecture
- Functional status: Completed
- Architectural type: Church
- Years built: 1922

Administration
- Diocese: Broken Bay
- Parish: Hornsby Cathedral Parish

Clergy
- Bishop: Anthony Randazzo
- Priest: Very Rev Brendan Lee

Our Lady of the Rosary Cathedral, Waitara is the Roman Catholic cathedral church of the Diocese of Broken Bay, located in Waitara, Sydney, New South Wales. Australia. The cathedral is the seat of the Catholic Bishop of Broken Bay, currently the Most Reverend Anthony Randazzo.

== History ==
A church had existed in the vicinity of the current church since 1909, when a church was built on the side of the Pacific Highway. The parish of Waitara was established in 1916.

Over time, demand for Catholic schools in the area led the Congregation of Christian Brothers to establish St Leo's Catholic College, Wahroonga for boys on a 4.3-hectare (11-acre) site next to the church. Through the 1980s, the parishioners of the diocese were looking to build a new church and primary school.

In 1988, Diocese of Broken Bay Bishop Patrick Murphy set about building more adequate diocesan offices and a bishop's office for the fledging diocese, which had only been established two years prior. The bishop chose a large area on Yardley Avenue, Waitara formed by the purchase of two vacant blocks of land adjoining St Leo's College. Work began on the offices in early 1998 and they were completed by the end of the year. The same year, the parishioners of Waitara, along with parish priest Father Colin Blayney, decided to relocate and rebuild the church, selling the old church and land to Leighton Properties for A$5 million. A new parish centre of church, school, hall and presbytery was built and opened in 1991 and 1992.

== Cathedral ==
Since its establishment in 1986, the Diocese of Broken Bay had used Corpus Christi Church in St Ives as its cathedral. In 2008, the decision was made to move the Bishop's seat to Our Lady of the Rosary, a more central location within the diocese with better access to public transport connections. On 10 February 2008 Our Lady of the Rosary was inaugurated as the cathedral of the Diocese of Broken Bay.
