= Ignace Abdo Khalifé =

Ignace Abdo Khalifé SJ
- (Arch)Eparch of Saint Maron of Sydney
- Native name: يحيى عبده خليفه
- Church: Maronite Church
- Diocese: Eparchy of Saint Maron of Sydney
- In office: 25 June 1973 – 23 November 1990
- Predecessor: Eparchy erected
- Successor: Joseph Hitti
- Previous posts: Titular Archeparch of Apamea in Syria dei Maroniti (1970-1973); Auxiliary (Arch)Eparch of Antioch (1970-1973)

Orders
- Ordination: 24 August 1943 by Pierre-Marie Gerlier
- Consecration: 5 April 1970 by Paul Peter Meouchi

Personal details
- Born: 10 May 1914 Wadi Chahrour, Mount Lebanon Mutasarrifate, Ottoman Empire
- Died: 7 July 1998 (aged 84)

Ignace Abdo Khalifé, SJ (10 May 1914 in Wady Chahrour, Lebanon – 7 July 1998) was the first Eparch of the Maronite Catholic Eparchy of Saint Maron of Sydney in Australia.

== Life ==
Ignace Khalife joined the SJ and received his ordination to the priesthood on 24 August 1943.

On 20 March 1970 he was appointed by Pope Paul VI Auxiliary bishop and Patriarchal Vicar of Antioch and Titular bishop (pro hac vice) of Apamea in Syria of the Maronites. Maronite Patriarch of Antioch, Cardinal Paul Peter Meouchi ordained him bishop on 5 April 1970 and his co-consecrators were Nasrallah Boutros Sfeir, Titular bishop of the Tarsus of the Maronites and Joseph Salamé, Archeparch of Aleppo in Syria.

On 25 June 1973 Khalife was appointed archbishop (pro hac vice) of the Maronite Eparchy of Saint Maron of Sydney.

On 23 November 1990 Pope John Paul II accepted his age-related resignation. He was co-consecrator of the Eparch Joseph Merhi, MLM as Bishop of Cairo.

On 7 July 1998 Eparch Khalifé died at the age of 74.

== Publications ==
Khalife has published several articles and papers, in addition, he wrote articles for the collective work of the Saint Joseph University.
