= Our Lady of Lebanon Co-Cathedral, Harris Park =

Catholic cathedral in Australia

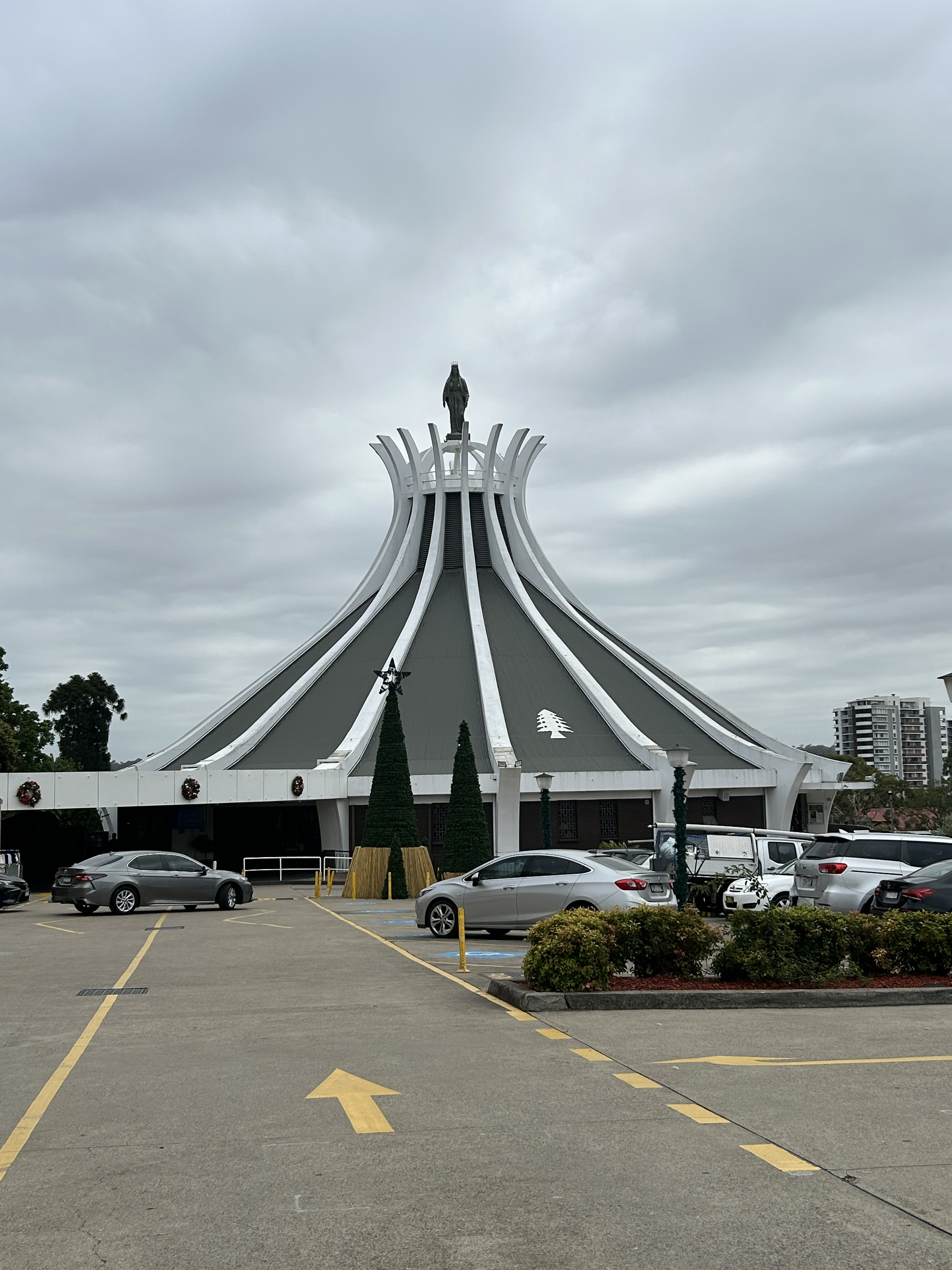

Religion
- Affiliation: Catholic Church (Maronite Church)
- District: Maronite Catholic Eparchy of Saint Maron of Sydney
- Ecclesiastical or organizational status: Co-Cathedral
- Leadership: Antoine-Charbel Tarabay OLM
- Year consecrated: 6 August 1978 (as Our Lady of Lebanon Church); 11 October 2014 (as Our Lady of Lebanon Co-Cathedral)

Location
- Location: Harris Park, New South Wales, Australia
- Interactive map of Our Lady of Lebanon Co-Cathedral, Harris Park
- Coordinates: 33°49′13″S 151°00′53″E

Architecture
- Groundbreaking: 22 March 1970 (initial foundation stone laid)
- Completed: 6 August 1978

Website
- olol.org.au

Our Lady of Lebanon Co-Cathedral, Harris Park is the co-cathedral church of the Maronite Catholic Eparchy of Saint Maron of Sydney and the largest Maronite church in Australia.

== History ==
Originally, a seven-metre tall, blue-and-white statue of Our Lady of Lebanon stood on top of the church however following community outcry, it was replaced with a smaller, bronze statue in 1980.

In 2016, construction began on a new aged care home, adjacent to the co-cathedral. It was opened in April 2023, operating asOur Lady Mercy Place Harris Park.

=== Expansion ===
In 2024, the parish unveiled plans for a multi-facted masterplan which would see major upgrades to the cathedral and the surrounding precinct.

The expansion included an additional 200 parking spaces, new underground parking and a redesigned forecourt. The development was approved in March 2026. As of May 2026, construction has yet to begin.
