= Our Lady Queen of Peace Cathedral, Broome =

Our Lady Queen of Peace Cathedral
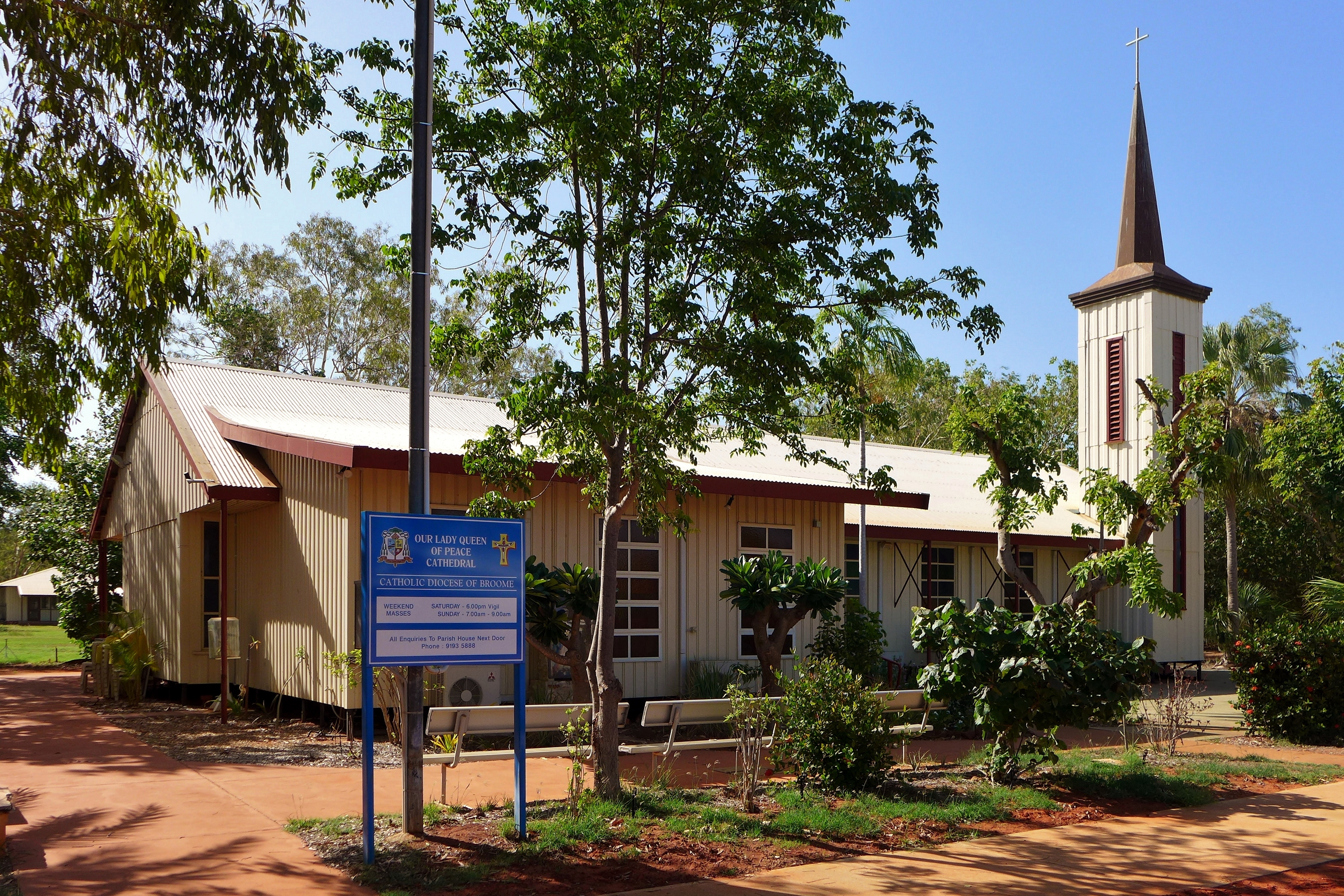
- The cathedral in 2019
- Our Lady Queen of Peace Cathedral
- 17°57′36″S 122°14′19″E
- Location: Broome, Western Australia
- Country: Australia
- Denomination: Catholic Church

History
- Dedication: Our Lady Queen of Peace
- Consecrated: September 1963

Architecture
- Years built: 1963

Administration
- Diocese: Broome

Clergy
- Bishop(s): Michael Henry Morrissey (Apostolic Administrator; also serves as the Bishop of Geraldton)

Our Lady Queen of Peace Cathedral, also known as Broome Cathedral, is the main place of Catholic worship in the city of Broome, Western Australia, and the seat of the bishop of the Diocese of Broome.

== History ==
In 1899, a wooden church was dedicated to Our Lady of Peace, with the help of the Philippine pearl divers. The tower and other modifications were completed in April 1904.

In early 1960, the old church of wood and iron needed repairs. The poor state of the church, combined with the fact that the building was too small for the growing community of faithful, led to the decision to build a new church for the town.

Stan Costello, originally from Perth, was commissioned to design the new church of Broome. Construction of the building, adjacent to the site of the old church, began in April 1963 and was completed in September of the same year.

== See also ==
- Roman Catholicism in Australia
