= Warriewood =

- Suburb
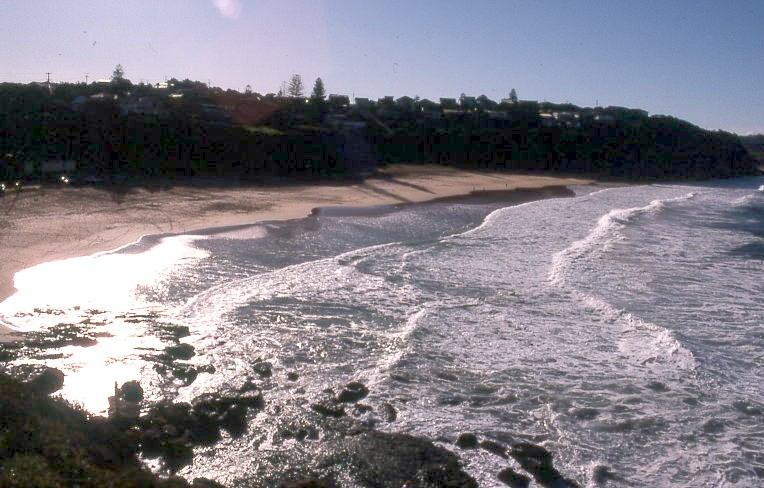
- Warriewood Beach

- Interactive map of Warriewood
- Coordinates: 33°41′38″S 151°18′17″E
- Country: Australia
- State: New South Wales
- City: Sydney
- LGA: Northern Beaches Council
- Location: 26 km (16 mi) north of Sydney CBD

Government
  - State electorate: Pittwater
  - Federal division: Mackellar

Area
  - Total: 4.2 km^{2} (1.6 sq mi)
- Elevation: 8 m (26 ft)

Population
  - Total: 8,379 (2021 census)
  - Density: 1,995/km^{2} (5,170/sq mi)
- Postcode: 2102
Suburbs around Warriewood
| Ingleside | Mona Vale | Mona Vale |
| Ingleside | Warriewood | Tasman Sea |
| Elanora Heights | North Narrabeen | North Narrabeen |

Warriewood is a suburb in northern Sydney, in the state of New South Wales, Australia. Warriewood is located 26 kilometres north of the Sydney central business district, in the local government area of Northern Beaches Council. Warriewood is part of the Northern Beaches region.

== History ==
Warriewood takes its name from the Warriewood Estate that was subdivided in 1906 by Henry F. Halloran, who had purchased it from the McPherson family.

== Commercial areas ==
Warriewood Square (previously known as Centro Warriewood) is a medium-size shopping centre in the southern part of the suburb. There is also a small cluster of shops located on Narrabeen Park Parade opposite Warriewood Beach. The suburb also contains a cinema complex, industrial area, a mini putt-putt golf, golf driving range and a McDonald's restaurant.

== Education ==
Warriewood has a Catholic high school, Mater Maria Catholic College. The local primary school is North Narrabeen Public, however, some students appeal to attend Mona Vale Public School or take the Opportunity Class for MVPS. Depending on the student's address Narrabeen Sports High and Pittwater High the two main high schools. The Peninsula Anglican Boys school was also briefly used as a location site for the television series Heartbreak High.

== Housing ==
Warriewood Valley was identified by the NSW State Government as a potential land release area. It was subsequently rezoned to allow intensification of residential dwellings and infrastructure. The rezoning and development of Warriewood valley has also resulted in the cleaning up of the water bodies and wetlands and water management techniques were applied to deal with the flooding.

As of the 2021 Census, 52.3% of the dwellings in Warriewood were separate houses, 25.1% were semi-detached, and 22.2% were flats or apartments.

== Infrastructure ==
- Boondah Reserve Sports Fields. Grass playing fields catering for multiple sports including soccer, netball and baseball.
- Boondah Road Sports Courts. Mixed-use hard surface courts completed in November 2020 and used for basketball and netball.
- North Narrabeen Reserve. Although the name may lead people to believe otherwise, the North Narrabeen Reserve sporting fields, including "Rat Park", are located within the boundaries of Warriewood.
- Sewage treatment plant operated by Sydney Water.
- Warriewood Valley Playground, also known as Rocket Park or Rocketship Playground.
- Lynne Czinner Park. Open grass area containing park fitness equipment and barbeque facilities.

== Demographics ==
As of the 2021 Census, Warriewood had a population of 8,379. Their median age was 41, similar to the national median of 38. 70.8% of people were born in Australia; the most common other countries of birth were England 7.4%, South Africa 1.7%, New Zealand 1.7%, Brazil 1.3% and United States of America 0.8%. 80.7% of people only spoke English at home; other languages spoken included Portuguese 2.0%, German 1.0%, Serbian 0.8%, Italian 0.8% and Croatian 0.8%. The most commonly reported religious affiliation was No Religion 38.6%, followed by Catholic 24.4%, Anglican 16.0%, and Not stated 6.8%.

== Transport ==
Warriewood is serviced by the B-Line bus service, launched in November 2017 with buses running between Mona Vale and Wynyard. Warriewood has undercover bus shelters located on both sides of Pittwater Road and a dedicated two-storey commuter car park on the eastern side of the road. The 185, 182 are the main buses that run through the suburb alongside the 199 and B-Line.

== Warriewood Wetlands ==
Warriewood Wetlands contains several Endangered Ecological Communities.

== Notable residents ==
- Damien Hardman, surfer
- Emma Lincoln-Smith, skeleton racer
- Holly Lincoln-Smith, water polo player
