= St Leo's Catholic College =

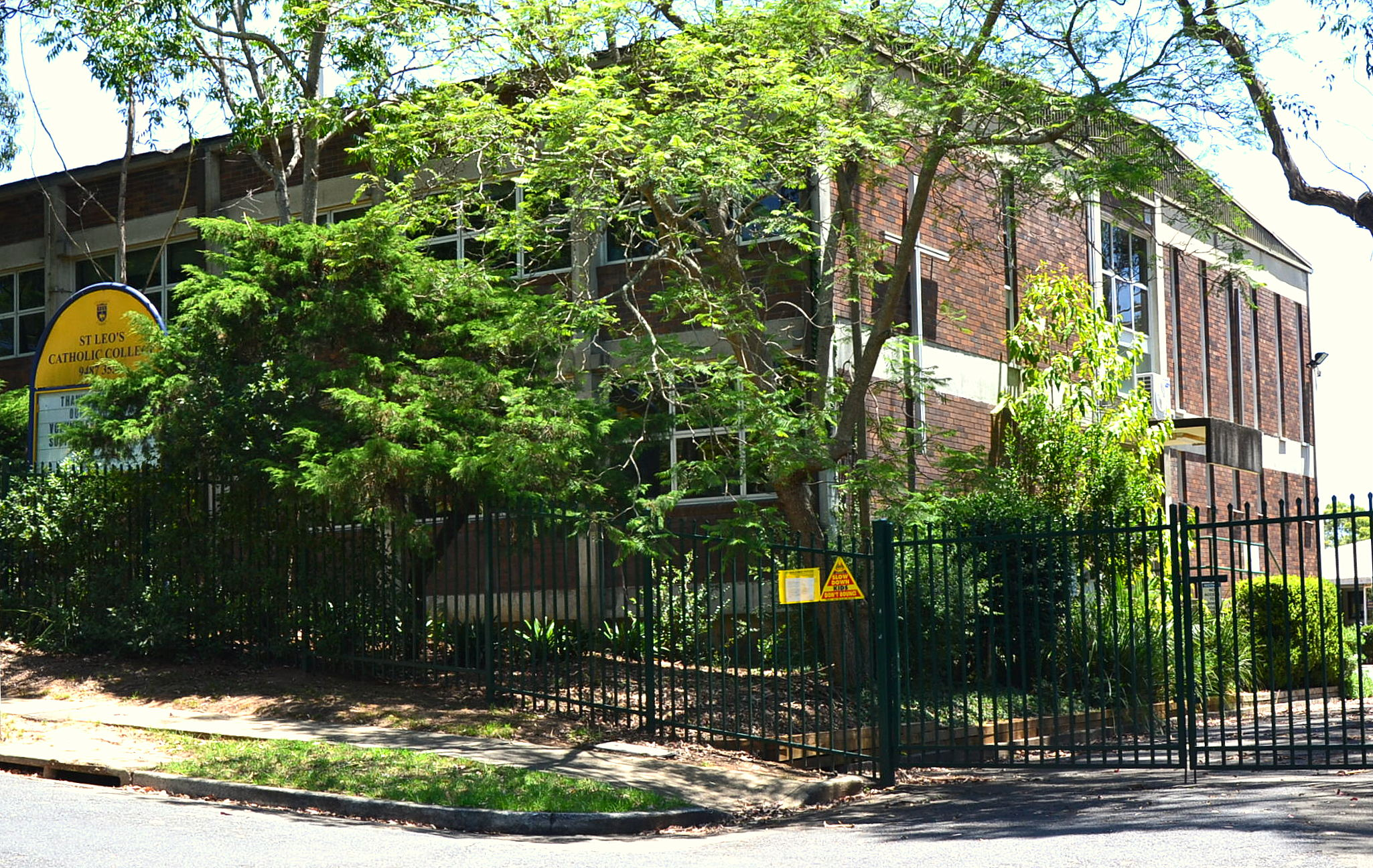

Location
- 16 Woolcott Avenue; Wahroonga, Upper North Shore, Sydney, New South Wales; Australia; 33°42′56″S 151°06′19″E

Information
- Type: Independent systemic secondary day school
- Motto: Latin: Lex Dei In Corde (God's Law In The Heart)
- Religious affiliation: Catholicism
- Denomination: Congregation of Christian Brothers (1956–1983)
- Patron saint: Leo the Great
- Established: 1956; 70 years ago
- Founder: Congregation of Christian Brothers
- Educational authority: New South Wales Department of Education
- Oversight: Diocese of Broken Bay
- Principal: Anthony Gleeson
- Years offered: 7–12
- Gender: Boys (1955–1982); Co-educational (since 1983)
- Enrolment: 800 (2019)
- Campus type: Suburban
- Colours: Purple and gold
- Website: www.stleos.nsw.edu.au

St Leo's Catholic College is a Catholic systemic secondary day school for boys and girls, located in the Upper North Shore suburb of Wahroonga in Sydney, New South Wales, Australia. Situated in the Diocese of Broken Bay, the high school currently has approximately 1000 students from Year 7 to Year 12.

The school's patron saint is Leo the Great, one of the early Popes of the Catholic Church.

== History ==
The college was founded by the Congregation of Christian Brothers on 25 April 1955 for the education of boys of Sydney's Upper North Shore. The first classes commenced in 1956 with 118 students in Years 3 to 6. By 1983, the Brothers were no longer able to staff the college and so its administration was passed to the Catholic Education Office, Sydney. Upon the departure of the Christian Brothers, the first lay Headmaster was appointed.

The College became co-educational, with the first girls enrolling in Year 11 in 1983 and Year 7 in 1984. By 1987, the college had fully completed the integration of co-education. When the newly created Diocese of Broken Bay was formed, the College came under the jurisdiction of the Catholic Schools Office, Broken Bay.

In the 1982, the College undertook an extensive building program including a multi-purpose hall and art and hospitality facilities. In 2002, a new Technology Centre was constructed. The multi-purpose Light of Christ Centre was opened in 2012.

By the start of 2020, the College completed a $25 million building works program that included the new Mary MacKillop Centre for Creative and Performing Arts, Technology and Hospitality which includes a dance and drama theatre, commercial kitchens, TAS workshops, art gallery, visual art studios, specialty music, orchestra, and band rooms as well as other learning spaces. Other recently completed upgrades include renovation of the College Chapel, Aquinas Resource Centre including library and cafe, a new College entrance, and additional outdoor recreation spaces.

In 2020, the College introduced new academic and sports uniforms for both junior and senior students, with a three-year transition period for the new uniform.

== Campus and facilities ==
St Leo's is located on six hectares (fifteen acres) in the Upper North Shore suburb of Wahroonga and, in 2020, completed a $25 million building upgrade. Facilities include:

- the new Mary MacKillop Centre for Creative and Performing Arts, Design, Technology and Hospitality, which includes a theatre, art facilities, kitchens, woodworking shops, and large meeting spaces
- The Light of Christ Centre – a multipurpose complex for over 1000 people used for indoor sports, assemblies and a range of College functions and events
- a Chapel
- two full-sized sports ovals and three outdoor basketball courts
- two large shaded outdoor recreational areas
- an Aquinas Resource Centre (LIBRARY) including a library, study hubs, open learning areas, student cafe, and outdoor meeting area
- a canteen.

== House system ==
Each student is allocated to one of the eight College houses. Each house has a brother and or sister house which combine for certain occasions. The houses have been named in honour of Saints and other influential faith leaders:

- Aquinas (green)
- Bakhita (purple)
- Chanel (dark blue)
- Loyola (gold)
- McAuley (light blue)
- MacKillop (bronze)
- Teresa (white)
- Xavier (red)

== See also ==
- List of Catholic schools in New South Wales
- Catholic education in Australia
