= Ingrid Jonach =

Australian writer

- Born: 6 May 1983 (age 43); Canberra, Australia
- Education: University of Canberra (BA in Professional Writing, 2005)
- Occupations: Author; Journalist; Public Relations Professional
- Notable work: The Frank Frankie, Frankie Goes to France, When the World Was Flat (and we were in love), A Lot of Things
- Website: ingridjonach.com.au

Ingrid Jonach (born 6 May 1983) is a children's and young adult author who lives in Canberra. She graduated with a bachelor of communications from the University of Canberra with a Bachelor of Arts in Professional Writing in 2005. She has worked as a journalist and in public relations. Her books include children's picture book A Lot of Things and children's novels The Frank Frankie and Frankie goes to France, which are about a young girl who starts her own newspaper.

Her début young adult novel When the World was Flat (and we were in love) was published by global science fiction and fantasy imprint Strange Chemistry in 2013.

== Works ==
- When the World Was Flat (and we were in love) (Strange Chemistry, 2013). ISBN 978-1-908-84458-3
- Frankie goes to France (Pan Macmillan, 2008). ISBN 978-0-330-42414-1
- The Frank Frankie (Pan Macmillan, 2007). ISBN 978-0-330-42326-7
- A Lot of Things (here publications, 2005). ISBN 0-9757741-0-7
