= Antoine-Charbel Tarabay =

Lebanese Catholic bishop (born 1967)

The Most Reverend Antoine-Charbel Tarabay OLM
- Church: Maronite Catholic Church
- Diocese: Eparchy of St Maron of Sydney
- Appointed: 17 April 2013
- Installed: 25 May 2013
- Predecessor: Ad Abi Karam

Orders
- Ordination: 11 July 1993
- Consecration: 25 May 2013 by Bechara Boutros al-Rahi
- Rank: Bishop

Personal details
- Born: 15 November 1967 (age 59)

Antoine-Charbel Tarabay, OLM (born 15 November 1967 in Tannourine, Lebanon) is a Lebanese Maronite bishop, currently serving as bishop of the Maronite Catholic Eparchy of Saint Maron of Sydney.

== Life ==
Tarabay was born in Tannourine, Lebanon on 15 November 1967. He joined the Congregation of the Lebanese Maronite Order of Monks and on 17 October 1992 made his perpetual religious vows. He was ordained to the priesthood on 11 July 1993.

Prior to his appointment, he was the superior of the order in the Monastery of St Charbel, Punchbowl and the rector of the parish. On April 17, 2013 Pope Francis appointed him bishop of the Eparchy of Saint Maron of Sydney. Maronite Patriarch of Antioch, Cardinal Bechara Boutros al-Rahi, OMM, ordained him on May 25 of the same year and his co-consecrators were the Archbishop of Beirut, Paul Youssef Matar, and the Bishop of Batroun, Mounir Khairallah.
