= Pontifical Maronite College =

Catholic College for Eastern priests

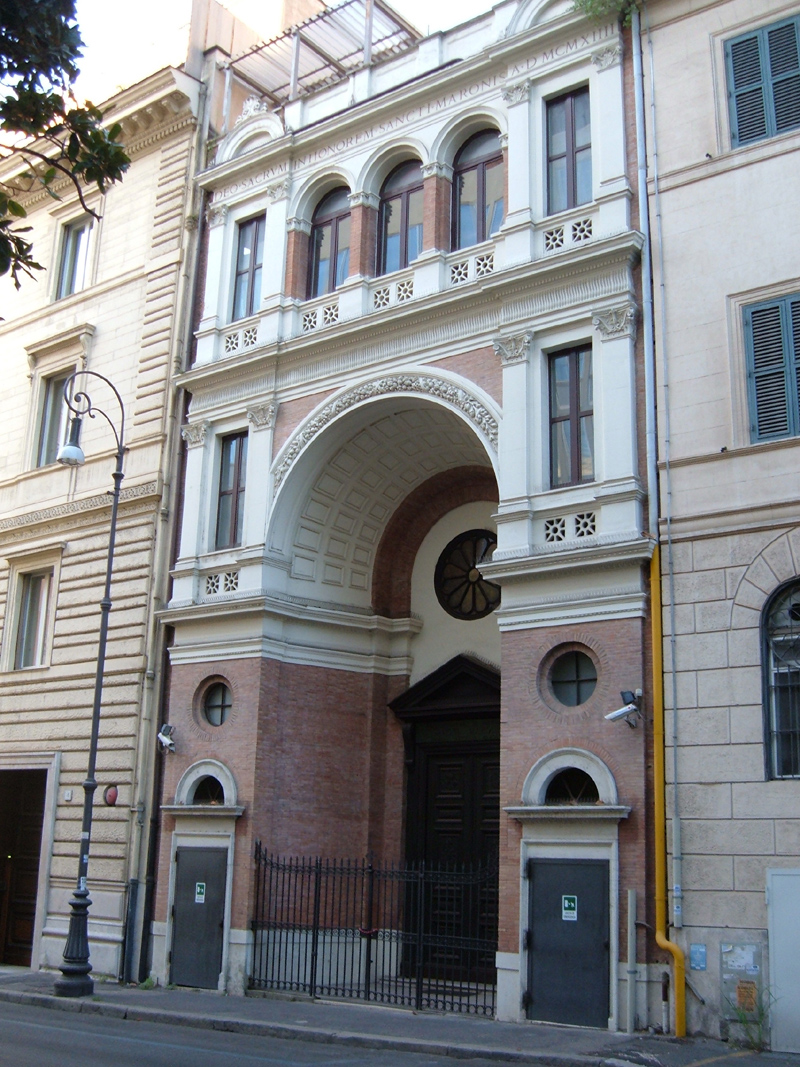
- Church of St Maron next to the Pontifical Maronite College
- Type: Seminary
- Established: 5 July 1584
- Founder: Pope Gregory XIII
- Religious affiliation: Catholic Church
- Location: Rome, Italy; 41°54′28.9″N 12°29′14.23″E
- Website: collegiopcm.org/en/

The Pontifical Maronite College (Italian: Pontificio Collegio dei Maroniti) is one of the Roman Colleges of the Catholic Church. Founded originally in 1584 in order to educate Maronite priests, the college provides now higher education to priests from also other Eastern denominations and serves as the pastoral mission for the adjacent church of St Maron and the Procuracy of the Patriarchate of Antioch of the Maronites to the Holy See.

== History ==
=== Background ===
When the Crusaders arrived in the Near East, they were welcomed mostly warmly by the Maronites and attempts to renew or create a union between the Catholic and Maronite church followed. The papacy might have accepted the Maronites into union around 1181/82 and the Maronite Patriarch Jeremiah al-ʿAmshiti visited Rome in 1213, receiving from the pope the pallium, sign of a formal Roman acceptance of his position as patriarch. After the Mamluk expulsion of the Crusaders in 1292 there are no signs for communication between the Catholic and Maronite church until the Council of Ferrara-Florence (1438–1445), in which the Franciscans of Beirut played a pivotal role.

In the 1540s, Maronite Patriarch Musa sought to integrate closer into the Catholic Church and therefore intended to train Maronites in Rome, so that they would be able to learn Latin, Italian and Latin theology and teach it to the wider Maronite community back in Lebanon. This might have been a catalyst for the foundation of the college. At the same time, the Catholic Church mounted after the Council of Trent a world-wide missionary operation, aiming to defend its role as institutional center of the universal church against Protestants as well as Catholic monarchs aiming to increase their authority. Among the many newly founded missionary order, the Jesuits sent a first mission to the Maronites in 1578–1579 in which they found the local clergy not fully educated in the main articles of faith and coherent with the Tridentine reforms. The Jesuits therefore proposed reforms including the education of Maronite clergy in the heart of the Catholic Church in Rome and the first students arrived in 1579 and 1581.

=== Foundation ===
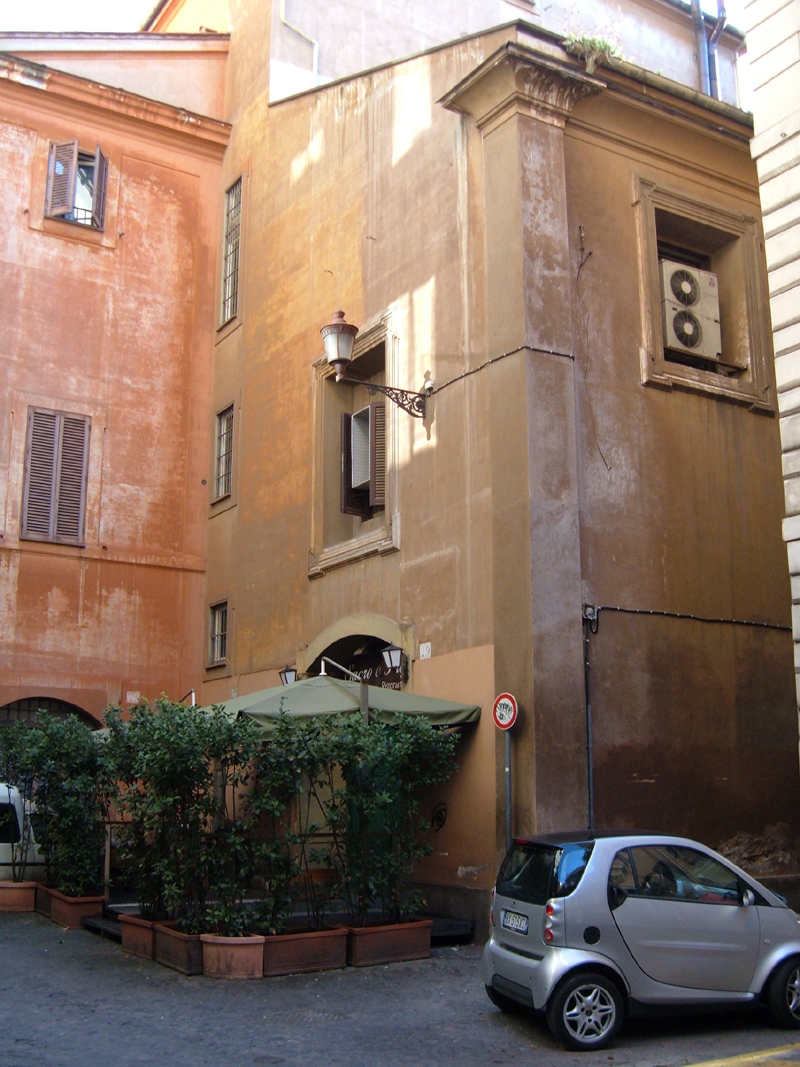
The former Church of San Giovanni della Ficozza close to the first Maronite College, which was given to the Maronite College for use

The Maronite College of Rome was officially launched on 5 July 1584. Its primary aim was to educate Maronites in the sciences of the Catholic Church (such as Latin and Latin theology) and it was run by the Jesuits. The college was located in the Trevi district on a street called "Via dei Maroniti" in a former hospice dedicated for Maronite pilgrims which consisted of two dormitories, accommodating eight students each.

Pope Gregory XIII officially confirmed the college in his bull Humana sic ferunt on 28 July 1584. In this bull, he underlined the necessity of educating the Maronites, who were enduring the Turkish yoke, in the humanities. The other benefactor of the college was cardinal Antonio Carafa, who had been named protector of the Maronite nation in 1569 and proved a generous patron of the institution. The college was given the nearby church of San Giovanni della Ficozza (today not in use) for use. Today the former church building is the site of the restaurant "Sacro e Profano."

Nasser Gemayel estimated that around 280 students passed through the institution between 1579 and 1788, though the number present at any time varied, with only nine students being present in 1644 and four in 1769. Several book by scholars of the Maronite College were printed at the Maronite press in the seventeenth century, the most important work being The Syriac Maronite Šḥīm, The Officium simplex septem dierum hebdomadae, printed in 1624. Though there were at times also attempts to open Maronite colleges elsewhere, these were often unsuccessful or short lived, such as that open in 1667 in Ravenna. The alumni of the Maronite College led to an increasing reform movement in the Maronite Church which resulted in the Lebanese Council of 1736, a major milestone in the history of the Maronite Church.

After the dissolution of the Jesuits in 1773, the Maronite College begun to decline as neither the Catholic Church was able to find an alternative to the Jesuits to administer and fund the college nor could the Maronite Patriarch save the school from closing. In 1797, a school modelled on the Maronite College was created in Ghosta in the Ayn Warqa convent, which, together with other schools founded in Syria by alumni of the Maronite college, made it progressively possible not to have to travel to Rome for training. The Maronite College in Rome was finally officially abolished in 1808 after twenty years of stagnation.

=== Refoundation ===
The present Pontifical Maronite College was built on new foundations by pope Leo XIII in 1891, who showed a particular interest in the Churches of the East. The college was closed again during the Second World War and reopened in 2001 in the Ludovisi, though many of its books had been shifted to the Pontifical Oriental Institute.

Today, the Maronite College serves as place for higher education for priests who have finished the first cycle of studies in philosophy and theology and takes in priests for various Eastern Christian Churches, including those not in communion with the Holy See. Additionally, the college serves also as the pastoral Mission for the adjacent church of St Maron and as the Procuracy of the Patriarchate of Antioch of the Maronites to the Holy See.

=== Role in the canonization of Charbel Makhlouf, first Lebanese saint of the Roman Catholic Church ===
The Maronite College, led by its long-time Rector Pietro Sfair, played a pivotal role in the path to sainthood of the first Lebanese saint of the Roman Catholic Church. Charbel Makhlouf had first been declared a "Servant of God" by Pope Pius XI in 1925, when Sfair was a 37-year-old priest in Rome. In 1938, on the occasion of Sfair's silver jubilee as a priest, Maronite Patriarch Anthony Peter Arida named Sfair a Chorbishop of the Maronite Church and Pope Pius XI named Sfair a Domestic Prelate, granting to Sfair the title Monsignor of the Roman Catholic Church. In 1953, Sfair was appointed Bishop and he leveraged his new position to advocate for and support Charbel Makhlouf being declared "Venerable" by Pope Pius XII in 1954. In 1960, Sfair was appointed Archbishop and he leveraged his new position to advocate for and support Charbel Makhlouf being declared "Blessed" by Pope Paul VI on December 5, 1965, at the conclusion of the Second Vatican Council. The canonization of Charbel Makhlouf by Pope Paul VI took place on October 9, 1977 - he is the first Lebanese saint of the Roman Catholic Church. Sfair did not live to see this result of his life's work, as he had died three years earlier. Sfair's advocacy and promotion of St Charbel, a saint who is venerated in Lebanon by Christians of all sects, Moslems and Druze, alike, can be broadly interpreted in the same light as Sfair's contributions to inter-faith understanding, as seen in his role in the drafting of Nostra Aetate and his transmission of knowledge about the House of Mary.

== Famous alumni ==
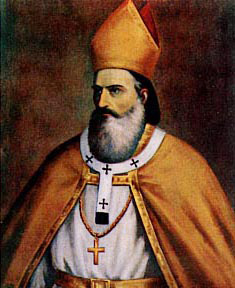
Istifan al-Duwayhi, one of the most prominent alumni of the Maronite college

- Sergius Gamerius (1610 – 1668), Arabist and Maronite bishop
- George Omaira (1570 – 1644), first Maronite Patriarch to be educated at the Maronite College
- Abraham Ecchellensis (1605 – 1664), Maronite philosopher and linguist
- Istifan al-Duwayhi (1630 – 1704), Maronite Patriarch and Historiographer
- Josepho Aloysio Assemani (1710 – 1782), Maronite Catholic priest and orientalist
- Pietro Sfair (1888-1974), Archbishop of the Maronite Catholic Church and Council Father at the Second Vatican Council. Rector of the Collegio Maronita di Roma 1954 to 1974.
- Bechara Boutros Al-Rahi, (1940), 77th Maronite Patriarch of Antioch, and head of the Maronite Church, a position he has held since 15 March 2011, succeeding Patriarch Nasrallah Boutros Sfeir.

== Bibliography ==
- Abouzayd, Shafiq (2019). "The Maronite Church". In King, Daniel (ed.). The Syriac world. London: Routledge. ISBN 978-1-138-89901-8.
- Baglioni, Pina (April 2011). "A bridge between East and West". www.30giorni.it. 30Giorni.
- Kennerley, Sam (2022). Rome and the Maronites in the Renaissance and Reformation: the formation of religious identity in the early modern Mediterranean. London New York, NY: Routledge, Taylor & Francis Group. ISBN 978-0-367-76079-3.
- Pizzorusso, Giovanni; Girard, Aurélien (2017). "The Maronite college in early modern Rome: Between the Ottoman Empire and the Republic of Letters". In Chambers, L.; O’Connor, T (eds.). Collegial Communities in Exile. Education, migration and Catholicism in early modern Europe. Manchester Scholarship Online.
