= Our Lady of Lebanon Maronite Cathedral (Paris) =

Maronite Catholic cathedral in France

Coordinates: 48.8440°N 2.3453°E

Our Lady of Lebanon of Paris Cathedral
- Cathédrale Notre-Dame-du-Liban de Paris
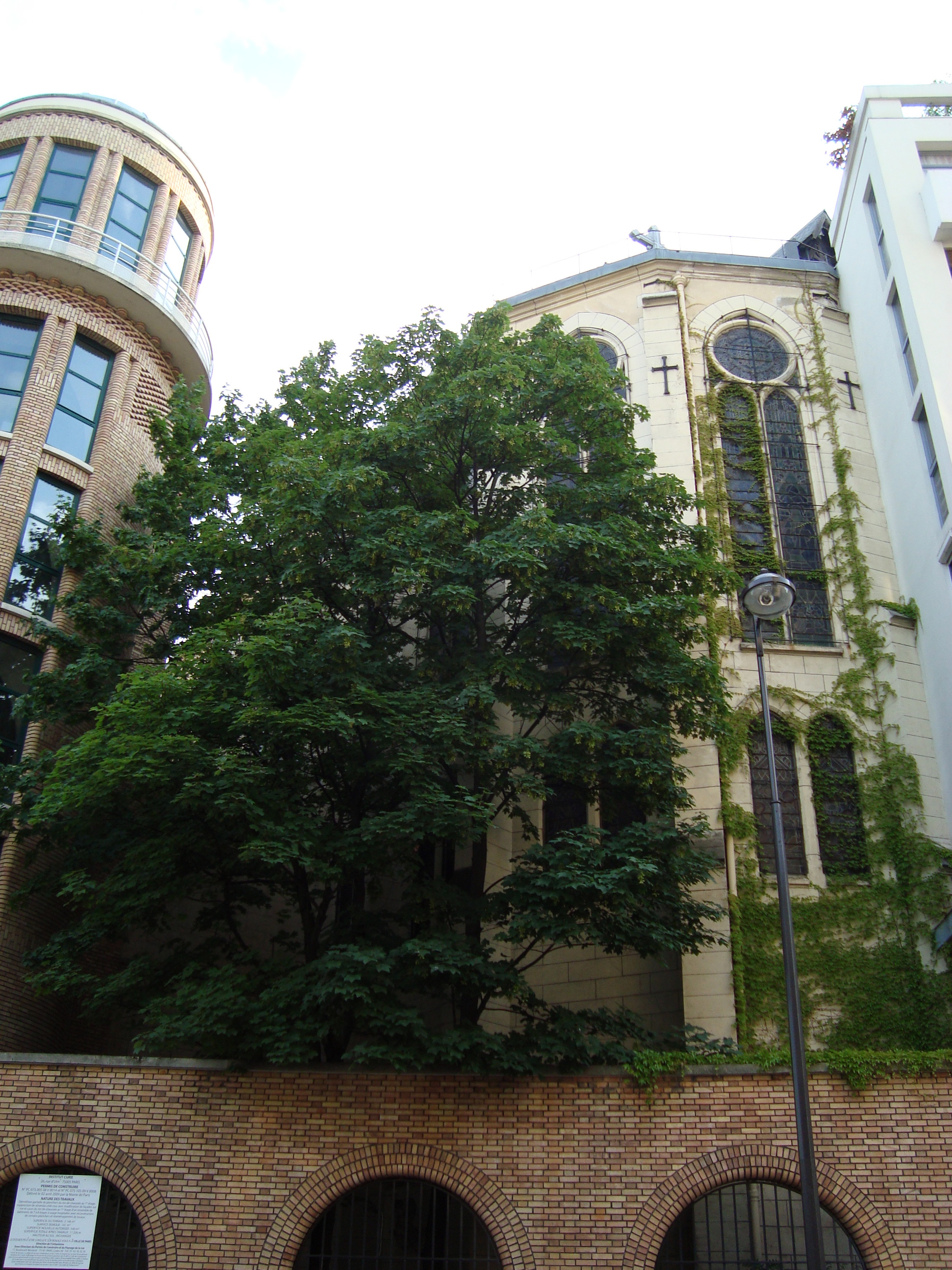
- Our Lady of Lebanon of Paris Cathedral
- Location: 15-17 rue d'Ulm; 5th arrondissent Paris
- Country: France
- Denomination: Catholic Church
- Sui iuris church: Maronite Church

History
- Status: Active
- Consecrated: 13 May 1894

Architecture
- Functional status: Cathedral
- Architect: Jules-Godefroy Astruc
- Style: Neo-Gothic
- Years built: 1893-1894

Administration
- Diocese: Maronite Catholic Eparchy of Our Lady of Lebanon of Paris

Clergy
- Archbishop: Nasser Gemayel

Our Lady of Lebanon of Paris Cathedral (Cathédrale Notre-Dame-du-Liban de Paris) is the cathedral and mother church of the Maronite Catholic Eparchy of Our Lady of Lebanon of Paris, part of the Maronite Church, for worship of Eastern Catholic tradition. It is located by the Jesuit Fathers of Sainte-Geneviève school in the 5th arrondissent in Paris, France, constructed 1893–94 by architect Jules-Godefroy Astruc.

== History ==
Constructed circa 1893–94 by architect Jules-Godefroy Astruc, it was inaugurated on 13 May 1894, allocated by the Jesuit Fathers of Sainte-Geneviève school in Paris, consecrated to Our Lady of Lebanon, a Marian shrine in Beirut, Lebanon. Following the 1905 French law on the Separation of the Churches and the State, the Jesuits left it. It was then assigned in 1915 to the Maronite worship. In 1937, the Franco-Lebanese home was built around the parish. Renovations of the roof, canopy and rose were made in 1990–1993

== Architecture ==
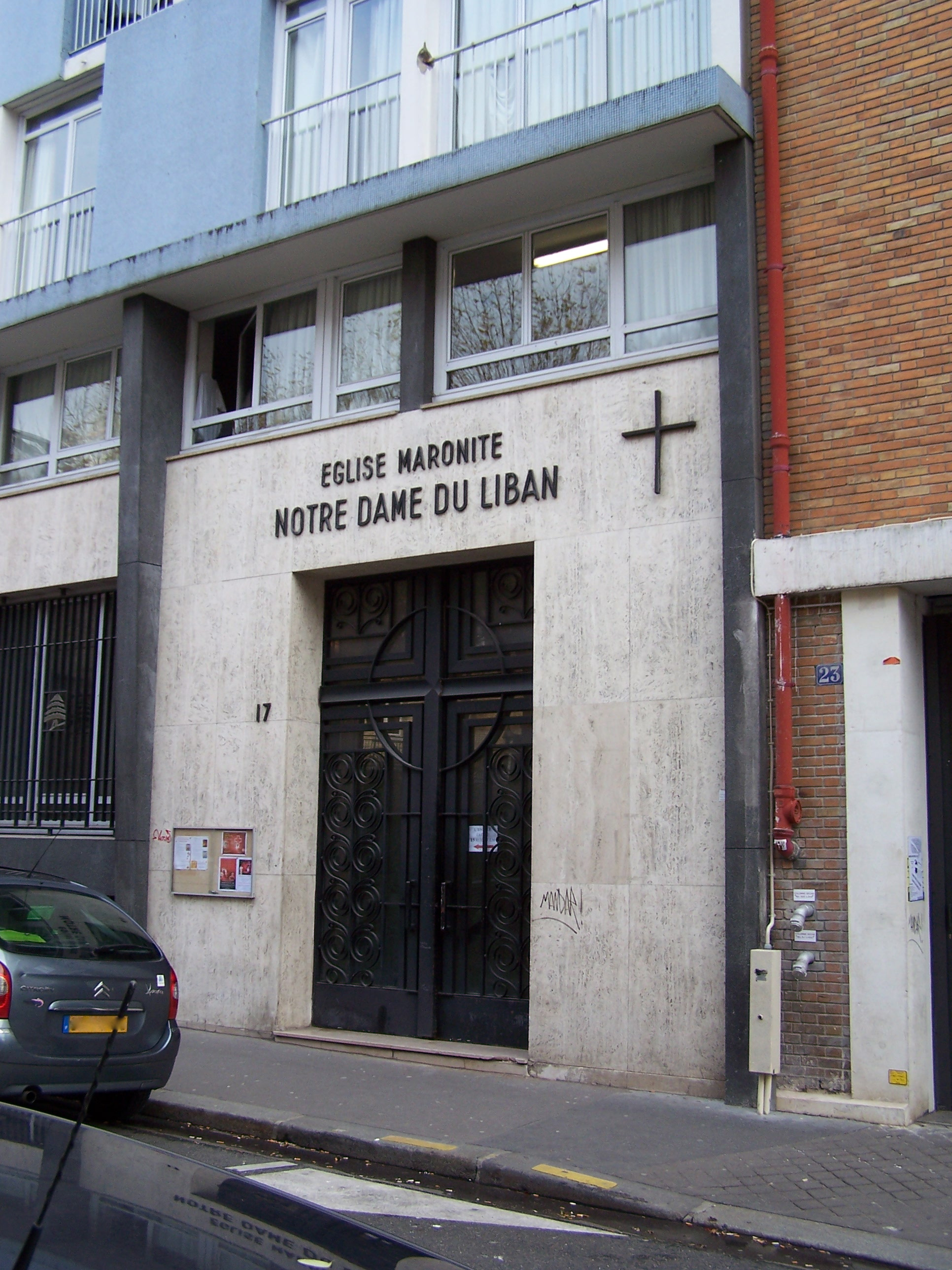
Entrance to the church.

The Church of Our Lady of Lebanon also had a cultural role over 30 years, with the classical label Erato who performed most of their recordings in the church. More than 1,200 discs were recorded, including the flautist Jean-Pierre Rampal, trumpeter Maurice André and chamber orchestra Jean-François Paillard.

== Interiors ==
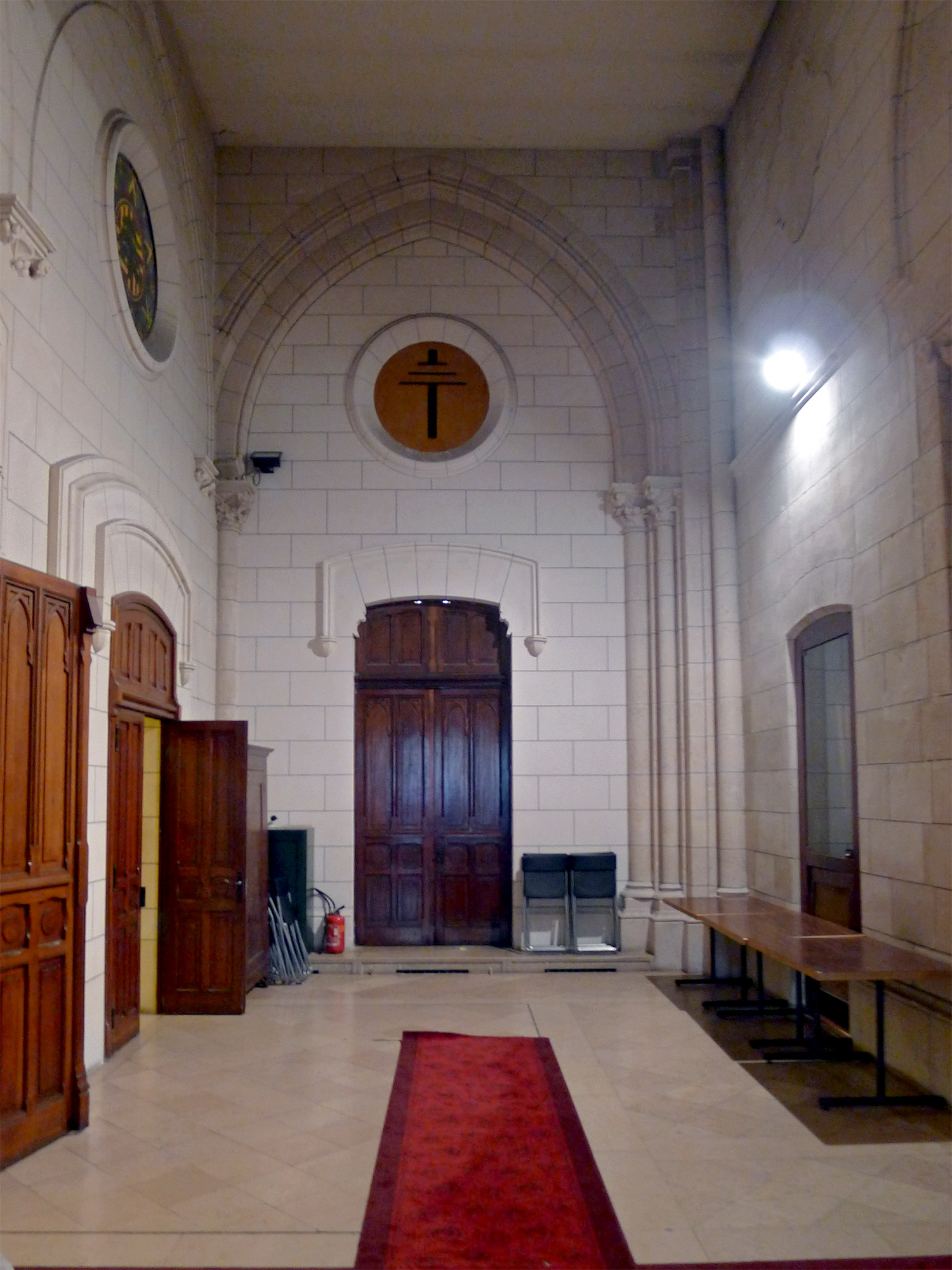
The interior entrance.

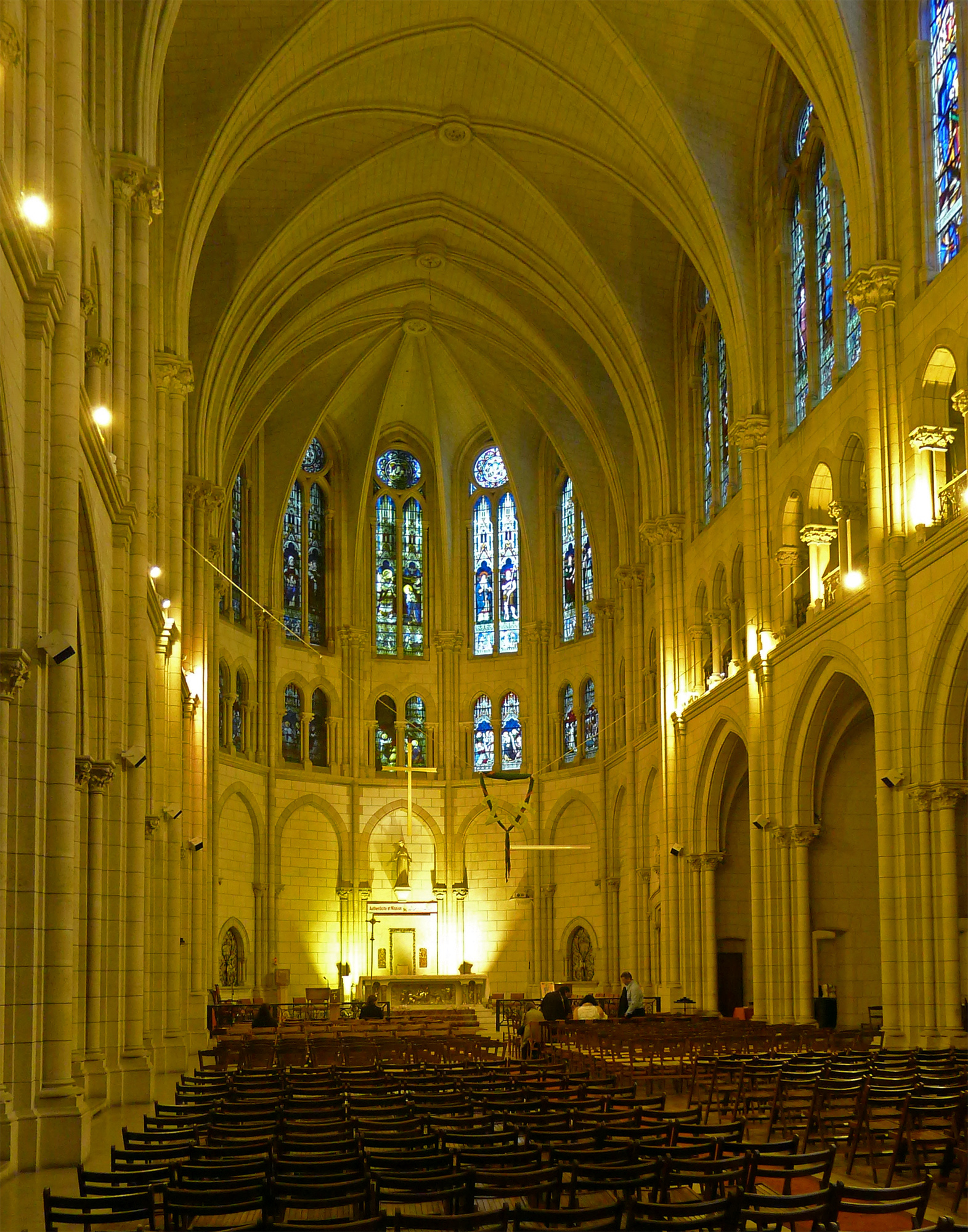
The nave and chancel.

In 1984, at the suggestion of fr:Robert Calle, director of the Curie Institute, adjoining the place was invested for six months by Spanish artist Miquel Barceló who installed a temporary workshop and painted his series of paintings in the Louvre exposed in the following year in the CAPC musée d'art contemporain de Bordeaux.

== See also ==
- Maronite Catholic Eparchy of Our Lady of Lebanon of Paris
