= Ptolemais (bishopric) =

Ptolemais was a titular bishopric established following the Roman conquest of the then Hellenized city of Ptolemais in Canaan or Ake-Ptolemais (or Akko, Ake, or Akre in the location of the present-day city of Acre, Israel. It was maintained as a titular see across multiple Christian denominations.

== History ==
According to Josephus, the name of the ancient city of Acre, which he called Akre, was changed to Antiochia Ptolemais (Ἀντιόχεια Πτολεμαΐς) shortly after Alexander the Great's conquest, and then simply to Ptolemais, probably by Ptolemy I Soter, after the Wars of the Diadochi led to the partition of the kingdom of Alexander the Great and its inclusion first into the Egypt-based Lagid empire, then in the Seleucid Empire.

Around 37 BC, the Romans conquered the Hellenized Phoenician port city called Akko. It became a colony in southern Roman Phoenicia, called Colonia Claudia Felix Ptolemais Garmanica Stabilis.

The Romans built a breakwater and expanded the harbor at the present location of the harbor... In the Roman/Byzantine period, Acre-Ptolemais was an important port city. It minted its own coins, and its harbor was one of the main gates to the land. Through this port the Roman Legions came by ship to crush the Jewish revolt in 67AD. It also served as a connection to the other ports, for example Caesarea and Jaffa. The port of Acre (Ptolemais) was a station on Paul's naval travel, as described in Acts of the Gospels (21, 6-7): "And when we had taken our leave one of another, we took ship; and they returned home again. And when we had finished our course from Tyre, we came to Ptolemais, and saluted the brethren, and abode with them one day".

During the rule of Claudius Legions' veterans settled. With Berytus, Aelia Capitolina, and Caesarea Maritima, the city was one of four colonies created by Roman emperors in the Levant for veterans of their legions.

By 190, it had also become an important center for Christianity, with Clarus, the Bishop of Ptolemais, participating in a Christian leaders council.

Towards the end of the third century, Ptolemais was a predominantly Christian city with a large Jewish community. In the sixth century, an unidentified visitor from Italy reported that the city had beautiful churches. Indeed, an important discovery was made in 2011: a Byzantine church in the middle of San Giovanni d'Acri, as it was called in the Middle Ages.

== Ecclesiastical history ==
=== Bishops of Ptolemais in Syria ===
The Apostle Paul, returning from his trip to Macedonia and Achea, landed at Tyre, and from there sailed to Ptolemais, where he stayed some days with the local Christian community (Acts 21.7).

Ptolemais became a Suffragan diocese of the Metropolitan Archbishopric of Tyre.

The first known Bishop is named Clarus. in 190 AD he attended a Council meeting of bishops of Phoenicia and Palestine on the theme of the exact date of Easter. It is only by the fourth century that we have a testimonies of the next Bishop : Enea, who took part at the first Council of Nicaea in 325 AD and at the Synod held in Antioch in 341 AD. Nectabus was one of the fathers of the first Ecumenical Council of Constantinople in 381 AD. Between the 4th and 5th centuries lived Bishop Antiochus, opponent of John Chrysostom. Helladius participated in the first Council of Ephesus in 431 AD. Paul took part in the Council held at Antioch of 445 AD to judge the work of Athanasius of Perrhe and at the Council of Chalcedon of 451 AD. In 518 AD Bishop John signed a Synodal letter against Severus of Antioch and the Monophysite party. The last known Bishop of Ptolemais is George, who attended the second Council of Constantinople in 553 AD.

=== Crusaders ===
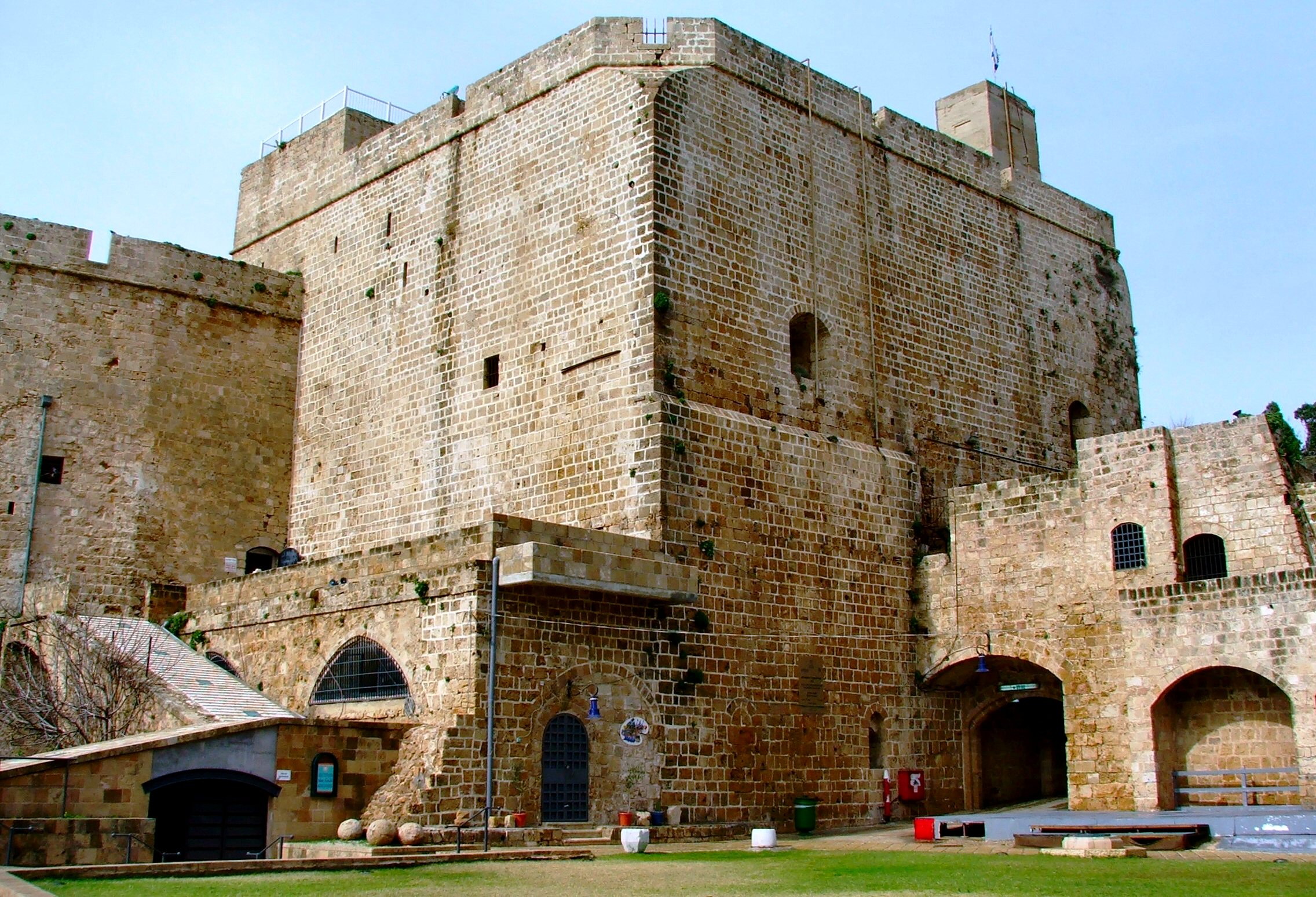
Acre Tower

In the 12th century, the Crusaders started all over in their Kingdom of Jerusalem. From 1107 - 1190 AD including a Latin Catholic Diocese of Acre. Then reconquered in the 13th century for another further decades of Christian domination with Jewish communities peacefully living together.

== Titular sees ==
Long after the Crusader states had perished, the Catholic church nominally restored the see (linked to the Acre succession) as a titular see, actually twice, in different rite-specific branches.

=== Latin titular see ===
- Established by nominal restoration as Episcopal Titular bishopric of Ptolemais (Latin) / Tolemaide (Curiate Italian)
- Gained 'territory' (i.e. apostolic succession) in 1870? from the suppressed Episcopal Titular bishopric of Acre (Akka), but suppressed circa 1895
- Restored and promoted in 1909 as Titular archbishopric of Ptolemais (Latin) / Tolemaide (Italian)
- Demoted back in 1925 as Episcopal Titular bishopric of Ptolemais (Latin) / Tolemaide (Italian; in 1926 renamed as Tolemaide di Fenicia)
- Renamed in 1933 as Titular bishopric of Ptolemais in Phœnicia (Latin) / Tolemaide di Fenicia (Italian) / Ptolemaiden(sis) in Phœnicia (Latin adjective)

It is vacant since decades, having had the following incumbents, so far of the (mostly fitting) Episcopal, i.e. lowest) rank (with an archiepiscopal exception) :

- Carolus Ludovicus Hugo, Norbertines (O. Praem.) (1728.12.15 – death 1739.08.02) without actual prelature
- Armand de Rohan-Soubise-Ventadour (1742.07.30 – 1747.04.10) as Coadjutor Bishop of Strasbourg (France) (1742.05.21 – 1749.07.19); later created Cardinal-Priest with no Title assigned (1747.04.10 – death 1756.06.28), succeeded as Bishop of Strasbourg (1749.07.19 – 1756.06.28)
- Ludwik Ignacy Riaucour (1749.03.03 – death 1777.11) (Polish) as Auxiliary Bishop of Diocese of Luck (Ukraine) (1749.03.03 – 1777.11)
- Onufry Kajetan Szembek (1796.06.27 – 1797.09.05) as Coadjutor Bishop of Płock (Poland) (1796.06.27 – 1797.09.05); next succeeded as Bishop of Płock (1797.09.05 – death 1808.12.31)
- Luiz de Castro Pereira, Congregation of Saint Joseph (C.S.I.) (Portuguese) (1804.10.29 – 1822.08.01) as Bishop-Prelate of Territorial Prelature of Cuiaba (Brazil) (1804.10.29 – 1822.08.01); later Bishop of Bragança e Miranda (Portugal) (1821.04.21 – death 1822.08.01)
- Maciej Pawel Mozdzeniewski (polish) (1815.07.10 – death 1819.04.02) as Auxiliary Bishop of Archdiocese of Mohilev (Belarus) (1815.07.10 – 1819.04.02)
- Ferdinand Maria von Chotek (Austrian) (1817.04.14 – 1831.09.30) as Auxiliary Bishop of Archdiocese of Olomouc (Olmütz, Moravia) (1817.04.14 – 1831.09.30); later Bishop of Tarnów (Poland) (1831.09.30 – 1832.02.24), Metropolitan Archbishop of above Olomouc (1832.02.24 – death 1836.09.05)
- Franciscus Renatus Boussen (1832.12.17 – 1834.06.23), first as Coadjutor Bishop Ghent (Flanders, Belgium) (1832.12.17 – 1834.06.23), then as Apostolic Administrator of West Flanders (Flanders, Belgium) (1833.01.21 – 1834.05.27); later Bishop of Bruges (Bruges, Flanders, Belgium) (1834.05.27 – death 1848.01.01)
- Alois Josef Schrenk (1838.02.12 – 1838.09.17) as Auxiliary Bishop of Archdiocese of Olomouc (Olmütz, Moravia) (1838.02.12 – 1838.09.17); later Metropolitan Archbishop of Praha (Prague, Bohemia) ([1838.06.20] 1838.09.17 – death 1849.03.05)
- Tommaso Feeny (Thomas Feeny) (1839.07.27 – 1848.01.11) without actual prelature; next Bishop of Killala (Ireland) (1848.01.11 – 1873.08.09)
- Giovanni Antonio Balma, Oblates of the Virgin Mary (O.M.V.) (1848.09.05 – 1871.10.27) as Apostolic Vicar of Ava and Pegu (then British Burma=Myanmar) (1848.09.05 – 1855.09.09); later Metropolitan Archbishop of Cagliari (Sardinia, Italy) (1871.10.27 – death 1881.04.05)

BIOs TO BE ELABORATED

- Edmundo Luís Kunz (1955.08.01 – 1988.09.12)
- Louis-Eugène-Arsène Turquetil, O.M.I. (1931.12.15 – 1955.06.14)
- Titular Archbishop: Augustin Dontenwill, Missionary Oblates of Mary Immaculate (O.M.I.) (1909.01.19 – 1931.11.30)
- Cassien-Léonard de Peretti (1875.03.31 – 1892.02.22)
- Carmelo Pascucci (1871.10.27 – 1874.04.22)

=== Maronite titular see ===
(Eastern Catholic, Antiochian Rite)

- Established as Episcopal Titular bishopric of Giovanni S. d’Acri (Latin 'Saint John of Acre') / Tolemaide di Siria (Curiate Italian), suppressed in 1890 but restored under those 'Crusader' names in 1919;
- Renamed in 1925 as Titular bishopric of Ptolemais (Latin) / Tolemaide (Curiate Italian; in 1926: renamed Tolemaide di Fenicia), suppressed in 1933
- Restored in 1956 as Episcopal Titular bishopric of Ptolemais in Phœnicia (Latin) / Tolemaide di Fenicia (Curiate Italian) / Ptolemaiden(sis) in Phœnicia Maronitarum (Latin adjective).

It has had the following incumbents, of the fitting Episcopal (lowest) rank with an archiepiscopal exception:

Titular Bishops of Giovanni S. d’Acri of the Maronites

- Clement Bahouth [Clémént Bahous] (? – 1856.04.01) (? – 1856.04.01), without actual prelature; later Patriarch of Antioch of the Greek-Melkites (Syria) ([1856.04.01] 1856.06.16 – retired 1864.08.13), also (ex officio) titular Patriarch of Alexandria of the Greek-Melkites and titular Patriarch of Jerusalem of the Greek-Melkites ([1856.04.01] 1856.06.16 – 1864.08.13); died 1882
- Grégoire Youssef-Sayour (1856.11.13 – 1864.09.29), without actual prelature; later Patriarch of Antioch of the (Greek-)Melkites (Syria) ([1864.09.29] 1865.03.27 – 1897.07.13) and as above titular Patriarch of Alexandria of the (Greek-)Melkites and of Jerusalem of the (Greek-)Melkites ([1864.09.29] 1865.03.27 – 1897.07.13)
- Titular Archbishop of Giovanni S. d’Acri of the Maronites: Youssef Massad (1883 – death 1890), not prelature
- Luigi Giuseppe El-Khazen (1919.02.23 – 1925 see below), no prelature

Titular Bishop of Ptolemais of the Maronites

- Luigi Giuseppe El-Khazen (see above 1925 – 1933.02.22 see blow), no prelature

Titular Bishops of Ptolemais in Phœnicia of the Maronites

- Joseph Khoury (1956.04.21 – 1959.12.11), then without prelature; later Eparch (Bishop) of Tyre of the Maronites (Lebanon) (1959.12.11 – 1965), promoted Archeparch (Archbishop) of Tyre of the Maronites (Lebanon) (1965 – 1992.02.05)
- Camille Zaidan (2011.08.13 – 2012.06.16) as Bishop of Curia of the (patriarchate of the) Maronites (2011.08.13 – 2012.06.16), later Archeparch (Archbishop) of Antelias of the Maronites (Lebanon) (2012.06.16 – ...)
- Joseph Mouawad (2012.06.16 – 2015.03.14) as Bishop of Curia of the Maronites (2012.06.16 – 2015.03.14), later Bishop of Zahlé of the Maronites (Lebanon) (2015.03.14 – ...)
- Paul Abdel Sater (2015.07.28 – ...), Bishop of Curia of the Maronites, no previous prelature.

== See also ==
- List of Catholic dioceses in Holy land and Cyprus
- Latin Catholic Diocese of Acre

== Sources ==
- GCatholic - Latin titular see
- GCatholic - Maronite titular see

== Bibliography ==
- Butcher, Kevin. Roman Syria and the Near East Getty Publications. Los Angeles, 2003 ISBN 0892367156 ()
- Moše Šārôn. Corpus Inscriptionum Arabicarum Palaestinae (CIAP). Volumes 30-31 of Handbook of Oriental Studies. Section 1, The Near and Middle East, v.30 (Handbuch der Orientalistik). Publisher BRILL, 1997 ISBN 9004108335 ()
