= Sergius Gamerius =

Sergius Gamerius (or Sarkis al-Gamri; 1610 in Ehden, Lebanon – 1668 in Marseille, France) was an Arabist and Maronite bishop.

== Life ==
After study (from 1625) and be ordained a priest in Rome, and after a visit to Nicolas Peiresc in 1635 in Aix-en-Provence, he asked before his return to Lebanon in January 1642 to Cardinal Richelieu to buy Greek and Oriental manuscripts for him in the Orient. Apparently, in vain, because he was suspected by Englishmen and Dutchmen due to still rare oriental sort for sale.

Between 1648 and 1656 he worked, beside his nephew and successor Gabriel Sionita, as professor of Arabic at the Collège de France. On 25 January 1658 Gamerius became the Maronite Archbishop of the Damascus and more later of Cyprus but stayed from 1659 in Paris and in 1662 temporarily in Turin. He died in 1668 after a stay of unknown duration in Marseille.

== Literature ==
- Nasser Gemayel: Rôle the Maronites dans l'acquisition of manuscrits orientaux et dans la rédaction de leur cataloguqe en France. In: Exposition Le livre et le Liban jusqu'à 1900, Paris, 1962, 213-217, esp. 213th 216th.
- Nasser Gemayel: Les échanges entre les culturels Maronites et l'Europe. Vol. 1. Beyrouth 1984, 103. 243. 245-48. 252. 287f. 298.
