= Gabriel ibn al-Qilai =

Gabriel ibn al-Qilai (in exact Arabic transcription: Jibrāyīl ibn al-Qilā'i, in Latin: Gabriel Benclaius or Barclaius; 1447 – 1516), was a Lebanese Christian religious figure of the Maronite Church. Al-Qilai joined the Franciscan Order in 1470 and was consecrated bishop of the Maronites in Cyprus in 1507.

== Biography ==
Information about Gabriel al-Qilai is mostly found in the work of the historian patriarch Estephan El Douaihy, which was most often relevant to al-Qilai. Patriarch Douaihy protested al-Qilai's conversion to Catholicism, due to his belief in Roman Orthodoxy for the Maronites.

Gabriel al-Qilai was the son of Butrus al-Qilā'i and was born in the village of Lehfed of the Byblos District. The word Qilāi refers to a house in a rocky area. According to a custom, he was entrusted to a priest named Ibrāhīm ibn Dray to learn from him the Syriac and the reading of the liturgical books. According to the Patriarch Douaihy he was afflicted in his youth of ophthalmia which was the cause of his breakup with his fiancee and his withdrawal from society.

Towards 1470, he went on a pilgrimage to Jerusalem with another young man named John. In this city, he adhered the Custody of the Holy Land of the Franciscan order. The recruitment of two young Maronites in the order was assigned to the Flemish brother Gryphon of Courtrai (born in 1405 and died at St. Francis Convent in Famagusta on 18 July 1475), attached in 1450 to his death at the Franciscan mission of Mount Lebanon and loaded relations with the Maronites.

The two young Lebanese completed their last year of novitiate in the convent of Mount Zion. After their vows, they were sent to Venice to complete their training. Gabriel followed to Italy (in Venice and Rome) to study liberal arts and theology, a trip that lasted at least seven years. He himself said that he stayed in Rome for seven months and performed with his friend Jean theological training at Aracoeli convent. In the eulogy he made with his friend John in Italy when they were often subjected to people who accused the Maronite Church of heresy, a vigorous defense of their church. Both were ordained priests in Italy.

They headed back to the East around the years 1483/85. Then, until his episcopal consecration in 1507, the life of Ibn al-Qilai took place between Qannoubine (the center of the Maronite Church), Beirut (where there was a Franciscan monastery, Saint-Sauveur), and Jerusalem (where there was a Franciscan monastery, Mount Zion).

At that time, the Maronite Church was torn between his long-standing ties with the papacy and the strong presence in Lebanon of the Jacobite Church, of which it was culturally very close (mainly liturgy and the use of Western Syriac). Noah Lebanese Bqoufa (born in Ehden, in the heart of the Maronite country) was Patriarch of Antioch of the Jacobites from 1493 to 1509. There were no less than two convents in the region of Ehden that were occupied by Ethiopian monks members of the Ethiopian Orthodox Tewahedo Church, in the same communion that the Syriac Orthodox Church). Also a muqaddam (local chief) named Abdel Min'im Ayyub († 1495) had joined the Jacobite cause.

Ibn al-Qilai was particularly devoted to the fight against the Jacobite influences (who won, apparently, his native village of Lehfed and of his relatives) to secure the Maronites to the Catholic Church.

On November 23, 1494, the Franciscan friar Francesco Suriano, then custos of the Holy Land, sent an unfriendly letter to Maronite Patriarch Simeon Hadath: he marveled that he was elected in 1492 but has not yet sent anyone to Rome to request the pallium (the confirmation of his election); "enemies" of the new primate, grouped in Cyprus where the Maronite Church was well established, accused him of breaking the union with the papacy; Suriano asked the Patriarch to justify and renew in writing, with the bishops, priests and lay leaders of the Maronite nation, their membership of the Catholic Church. Then Gabriel ibn al-Qilai was sent by Suriano to investigate charges and collect the new act of faith of the patriarch and his people.

Ibn al-Qilai devoted himself to this task in Lebanon until at least 1499. In 1507, the bishop of the Maronites of Cyprus Joseph Kasaphani died and he was elected to succeed him. He first lived in the Saints Nuhra and Anthony convent of Nicosia, the traditional seat of the Maronite bishops, and then transferred the seat to Saint-Georges Convent of Tala.

Relations between the Maronite and Latin hierarchies in Cyprus were appalling: in 1514, Ibn al-Qilai wrote to Pope Leo X to complain about the nuisance that the Latin bishops to property inflicted the great Maronite monastery of Saint John Khuzbandu. The pope replied in 1515, confirming the rights of the Maronites and sent two other letters on this subject, to the Latin archbishop and the Venetian governor of the island.

Bishop al-Qilai died in 1516 in Cyprus.

== Work ==
Gabriel ibn al-Qilai authored many literary works, mixing prose and poetry, making him the first modern Maronite writer. The Maronite historians of the 17th and 18th centuries (Antoine Faustus Nairon, Estephan El Douaihy and Giuseppe Simone Assemani) were largely inspired by him.

In addition, he translated into Arabic many texts in Latin or Italian from the Latin Church, popularizing the literature of the latter among Maronites.

== Prose Treaties ==
- Kitab 'an' ilm al-ilāhīyāt partial Arabic translation of the Compendium theologicae veritatis Dominican Hugh Ripelin of Strasburg (v-1205 v 1270.);
- Kitab al-Idah'īmān (Book of the explanation of the faith), an introduction and four pounds (dated by the patriarch Douaihy 1494);
- Kitab an-Namus (Book of Law) collection of several treatises on the sacraments;
- Kitāb year Iman al (book on faith), Treaty Collection on the Nicene Creed and dogma of Chalcedon;
- Zahrat an-Namus (Flower of the law), instructions on the sacraments and daily prayer;
- Kitāb mijmā'ī qawl min al-al-Ahyar qiddīsīn (Book collecting the words of the blessed saints), life of the collection of devout sermons and theological treatises;
- Kitāb 'iẓāh (Book of Sermons);
- Speech about holy sacrament, collection of four speeches on the subject;
- Mass Treaty and its sections;
- Explanation of sacred confession;
- Apocalypse of St. John (translation of this book in the Vulgate Latin to Arabic transcribed in Garshuni);
- Comment of the prologue of the Gospel according to St. John;
- Art Writ of Ramon Llull (translation of this text in Arabic);
- The Book of Five Elders of Ramon Llull (idem);
- Philosophy, astrology and other subjects;
- Treaty on the calendar attributed to Eusebius of Caesarea (Treaty of computation in a mixture of Syriac and Arab transcribed in Garshuni);
- Excommunication against the Melkites (translation of a Latin text directed against the Greek Church);
- I'tiqād Sa'b Marun (Faith of the people of St. Maron), collection of treaties against Thomas Kfartab a monophysite in the 11th century;
- Collection of papal bulls addressed to the Maronites (translated from Latin into Arabic).

== Letters ==
- Letter against the Jacobites (refutation of a Noah Bqoufa's text then Jacobite bishop of Homs);
- Letter to a Maronite priest (a priest of Jebbet Bcharré accused by Ibn al-Qilai of being a crypto-Jacobite);
- Letter to the inhabitants of Lehfed;
- Letter to the Patriarch Simeon Hadath (dated November 16, 1494, making the history of relations between the Maronite and Latin Churches);
- Letter to Bishop David (dated December 23, 1495, addressed to a native Jacobite bishop of Lehfed);
- Letter to George al-Rami (a Maronite priest joined to the Jacobites);
- Letter to the people of St. Maron (dated on 7 May 1499);
- Letter to the inhabitants of Mount Lebanon;
- Spiritual Testament (written to his family since Cyprus at the end of his life).

== Poems ==
- The life of Mary and Jesus (741 to two half-lines of twelve syllables each, the poem addressed to pilgrims visiting Jerusalem);
- Mary Magdalene (19 to two half-lines of twelve syllables each);
- Palm Sunday (56 to two half-lines of twelve syllables each);
- Constantine and the Cross (500 to two half-lines of twelve syllables each);
- St. Alexis (90 couplets, or 180 to every two to seven syllables each hemistiches; form called "éphrémienne melody");
- St. Lucius (or Nuhra) (133 couplets or 266 verse, "éphrémienne melody"; story of a saint martyred under Diocletian, revered by the Maronites);
- Holy Euphrosyne (230 couplets, or 240 verse, "éphrémienne melody");
- St. Simeon Stylite (375 to each of two half-lines; this is Simeon the Elder, but the author sometimes confused with Symeon the Younger);
- The spheres (269 to 12 + 12, inspired by the poem Sphaera Tractatus de Johannes de Sacrobosco);
- The science (179 couplets or 358 verse, "melody éphrémienne" praised studious people);
- Zodiac, the planets and the movable feasts (122 to 12 + 12, poem on the computation);
- Medicine and the influence of the stars (82 couplets, or 164 verse, "éphrémienne melody"; the influentia planetarum in ancient medicine);
- About the four councils (147 couplets or 294 verse, "éphrémienne melody"; the first four ecumenical councils of Nicaea to Chalcedon, with a passage on the origin of the Maronite Church);
- Eulogy of John, drowned dead (zajal elegiac, 21 quatrains, or 84 verse, "éphrémienne melody"; his old companion John, became bishop of Aqura after 1492, drowned in a shipwreck on his way by sea a pilgrimage to the Holy Sepulchre)
- Against those who sowed weeds among the Maronites (poem transmitted incompletely, by "melody éphrémienne" organized in couplets, which subsist on about 350 to 243; the struggle of Ibn al-Qilai against the Jacobites);
- Mount Lebanon (295 couplets or 590 verse, "éphrémienne melody", the best known text of Ibn al-Qilai poem telling the story of the Maronite nation, ending with the following stanza: "These events. written in tears / And are from the books of History / They cover six hundred years, / Who correspond to the era of Maron in Mount Lebanon ", a text that has played a big role in the formation of Maronite identity).

== Poems of uncertain attribution ==
- Poem about Abraham (92 couplets in "éphrémienne melody");
- Poem about St. Chayna (21 couplets);
- Poem about Beau (564 couplets, 1128 to be in "tune éphrémienne" on the story of Joseph, son of Jacob);
- Poem about St. Anthony the Great (250 couplets);
- Poem about Holy Beard (53 couplets);
- Poem about science and the stars (to 143);
- Poem about the Virgin standing under the Cross (10 couplets);
- Poem about the Trinity (92 couplets).
- Thirty other poems have been attributed to Ibn al-Qilai however they are arbitrary or improbable.

== Editions ==
- Several texts were edited by Father Ibrahim Harfouche in the journal Al-Manara: vol. 2, 1931, pp. 805–813, 901-907; flight. 3, 1932, pp. 99–106, 177-184, 260-263 (letter to the patriarch Simeon Hadath), p. 264-268 (poem on Palm Sunday), p. 268 (poem about the Virgin standing under the cross); flight. 7, 1936, pp. 653–663, 767-779 (poem about Constantine and the Cross). The same publisher in the magazine Al-Machriq, vol. 14, 1911, p. 433-437, poem about the fall of Tripoli and taken from the hands of the Crusaders.
- Boutros Gemayel (ed.), Zajaliyyāt (= popular poems) Gabriel Ibn al-Qilā'ī, Beirut, 1982 (whose poem On Mount Lebanon; Arabic text only).
- Ray Jabre Mouawad (ed.), Letters to Mount Lebanon by Gabriel Ibn al-Qilā'ī (XV century), published and translated with a historical presentation of Mount Lebanon at the time, Paris, Geuthner 2001.

== Sources ==
- Hector Douaihy, a Maronite theologian ibn al-Qilā'i Gibra'il, Library of the Holy Spirit University, No. 31, Kaslik, 1993.
- Paul Rouhana, The vision of the religious origins of the Maronites between the XV and XVIII centuries since the bishop Gabriel ibn al-Qila'i († 1516) to the patriarch Estephan El Douaihy (1670-1704), 3 theft thesis. PhD, Institut Catholique de Paris, 1998.
- Ray Jabre Mouawad, "The Ethiopian monks in Mount Lebanon (late XV century)" underground Lebanon, No. 5, March 1998, Holy Spirit University of Kaslik, p. 188-207.
- Elias Kallas, "Ibn al-Qila'i (XV - XVI centuries), a pioneer of neo-Christian Arabic literature of Mount Lebanon" Quaderni di Studi Arabi 18, 2000, p. 221-230.
- Fouad El-Hage, The Kitab al-Namus Ibn al-Qilā'ī in the legal history of marriage among Maronites, Library of the Holy Spirit University, No. 34, Kaslik, 2001.
- Hoda Nehme-Matar, "Ibn al-Qila'i Gibra'il of Lehfed (1450-1516)," Studia Orientalia Christiana, Collectanea 35-36, 2003, p. 137-216 (Arabic), 217-256 (French).
- Iskandar Bcheiry, "L'attività nel Ortodossa Siro-Mont nella seconda metà del Libano secolo XV", Word of the East, vol. 23, 2003, p. 609-658.
- Joseph Moukarzel, Gabriel Ibn al-Qila'i († 1516): biographical approach and study of the corpus, PhD in History, University of Paris-IV, 2005 (Library and of the Holy Spirit University, No. 51, Kaslik, 2007).
