= Maronite Catholic Eparchy of Our Lady of Lebanon of Paris =

Eastern Catholic eparchy in France

Eparchy of Our Lady of Lebanon of Paris Eparchia Dominae Nostrae Libanensis Parisiensis Maronitarum
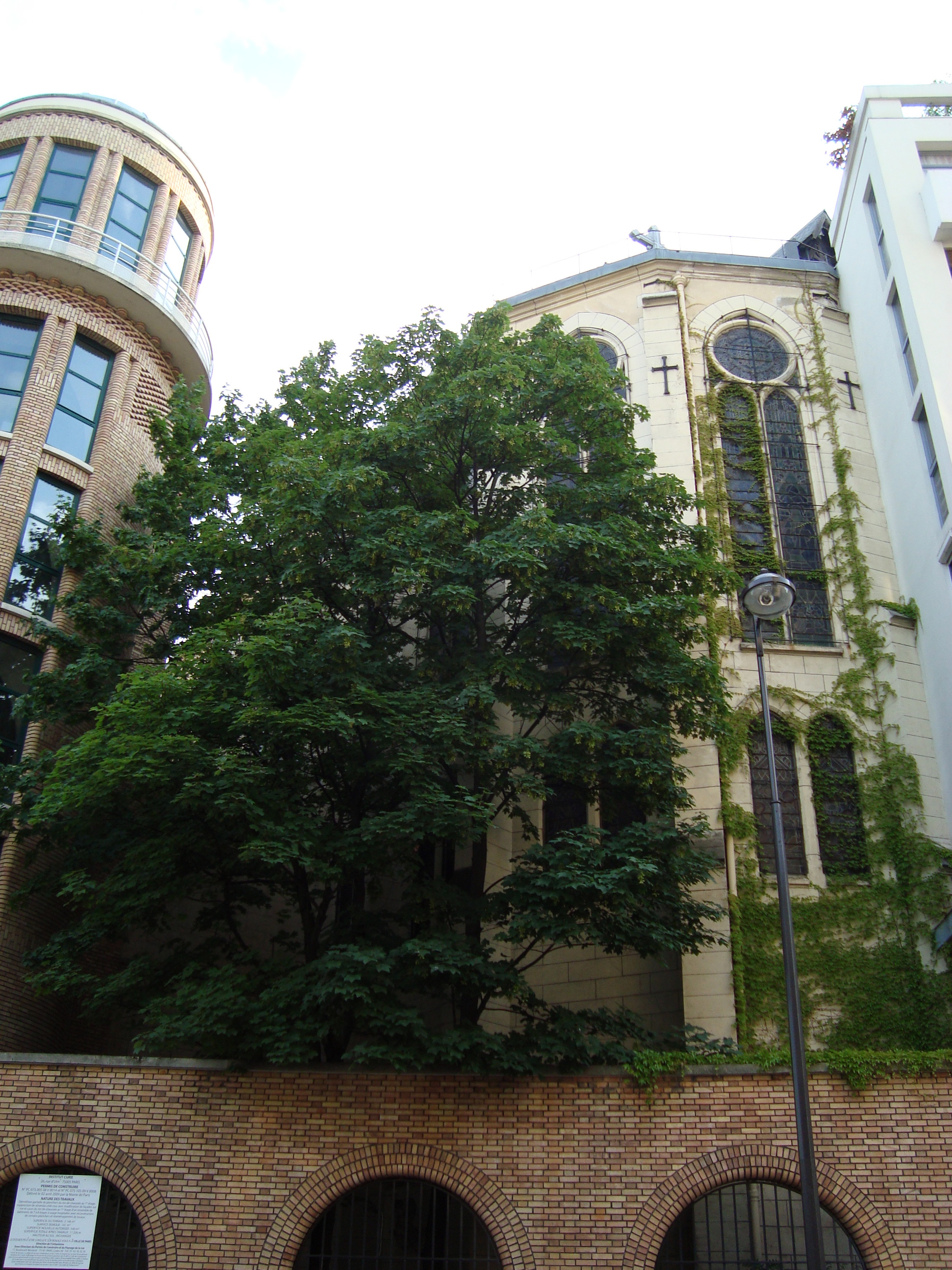

Location
- Country: France
- Headquarters: Lebanon

Statistics
- Population: (as of 2021); 51,520
- Parishes: 4

Information
- Denomination: Catholic Church
- Sui iuris church: Maronite Church
- Rite: West Syro-Antiochene Rite
- Established: 21 July 2012
- Cathedral: Our Lady of Lebanon Cathedral
- Secular priests: 21 Diocesan Priests

Current leadership
- Pope: Leo XIV
- Patriarch: Bechara Boutros al-Rahi
- Eparch: sede vacante
- Apostolic Administrator: Peter Karam
- Bishops emeritus: Nasser Gemayel

Website
- https://maronites.fr/

The Eparchy of Notre-Dame du Liban de Paris (in Latin: Eparchia Dominae Nostrae Libanensis Parisiensis Maronitarum) is a Maronite Catholic diocese. It was erected on 21 July 2012 by Pope Benedict XVI who appointed Eparch Nasser Gemayel as its first bishop. It had 50,300 baptized members in 2013. The Eparchy has 9 churches.

== Territory and statistics ==
The eparchy includes all Lebanese Maronite Catholic faithful in France. Its eparchial seat is the city of Paris, where is located the Our Lady of Lebanon of Paris Cathedral.

The territory is divided into four parishes and had 50,300 baptized members in 2013.

== History ==
Previously the Maronite faithful were under the jurisdiction of Ordinariate for Eastern Catholics in France, erected on 16 June 1954. The Eparchy was erected on 21 July 2012 by Pope Benedict XVI's papal bull Historia traditiones. His eparch, Nasser Gemayel, was previously pastor of the parish of Saint Tekla in Masqua (Lebanon).

== Eparchs ==
- Nasser Gemayel (21 Jul 2012 – 29 May 2024)

== See also ==
- Our Lady of Lebanon of Paris Cathedral
- Maronite Catholic Church
- Maronite Christianity in Lebanon
