= San Marone, Rome =

San Marone
- Church of Saint Maron
- Chiesa di San Marone
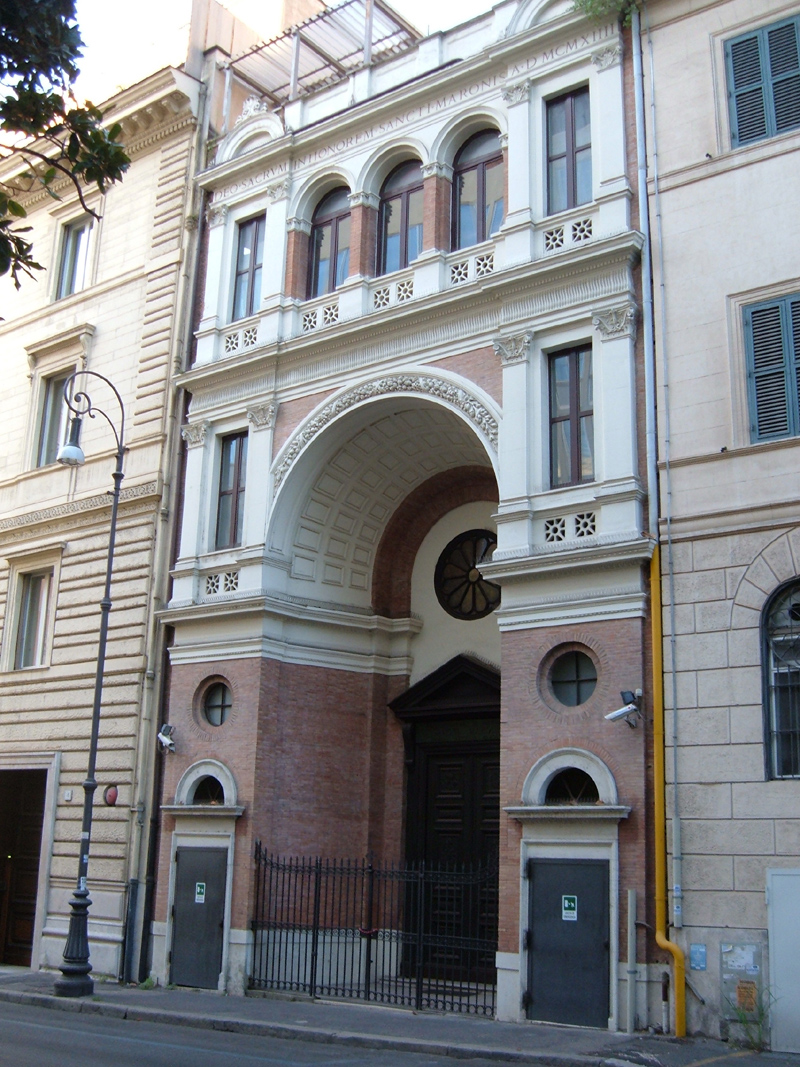
- The facade of San Marone
- Click on the map for a fullscreen view
- 41°54′28″N 12°29′14″E
- Location: Via Aurora 6, Ludovisi, Rome
- Country: Italy
- Language(s): Syriac, Syrian Arabic
- Denomination: Catholic Church
- Sui iuris church: Maronite Church
- Tradition: West Syriac Rite
- Website: sanmarunroma.org

History
- Status: national church
- Founded: 1890
- Dedication: Maron

Architecture
- Architect: Andrea Busiri Vici
- Architectural type: Baroque Revival
- Groundbreaking: 1890
- Completed: 1914

Administration
- Diocese: Rome

San Marone is a church in Rome located in the Ludovisi rione and dedicated to Saint Maron, a 5th-century Syrian hermit who founded the Maronite Church. It is the national church of the Lebanese Maronite community in the city, with services following the Antiochian Rite in Arabic. The church was built in 1890 based on a design by Andrea Busiri Vici, to serve the neighbouring Maronite monastery.

Next to it is the Pontifical Maronite College, where priests from various Eastern Churches, especially the Maronite Church, study after their first studies. The Maronite College also serves as Procuracy of the Patriarchate of Antioch of the Maronites to the Holy See.

== Gallery ==
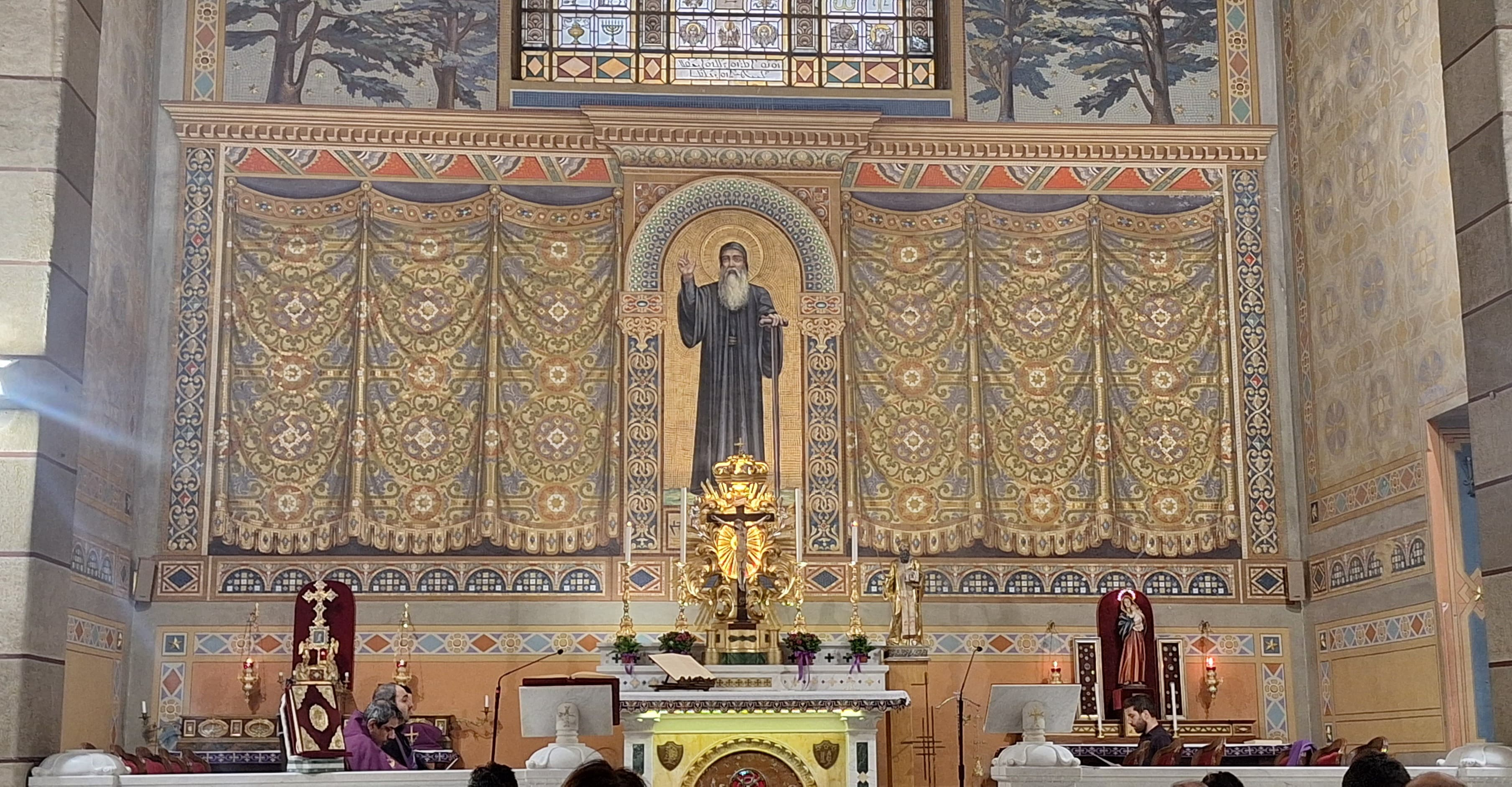
Altar of the church

== Sources ==
- (in Italian) C. Rendina, Le Chiese di Roma, Newton & Compton Editori, Milano 2000, p. 260-261
- (in Italian) G. Carpaneto, Rione XVI Ludovisi, in AA.VV, I rioni di Roma, Newton & Compton Editori, Milano 2000, Vol. III, pp. 1015-1037
