= Boutros Gemayel =

Lebanese Maronite Catholic prelate (1932–2021)

Boutros Gemayel (29 June 1932 – 21 August 2021) was an emeritus Maronite Archbishop of the Maronite Catholic Archeparchy of Cyprus.

== Life ==
Boutros Gemayel received on 12 April 1959 the sacrament of ordination to the priesthood.

On 11 June 1988 he was appointed by Pope John Paul II as Archbishop of Archeparchy of Cyprus with headquarters in Nicosia. On 11 September 1988 his episcopal ordination was performed by Maronite Patriarch of Antioch, Nasrallah Boutros Sfeir; his co-consecrators were his predecessor Archeparch Elie Farah and Joseph Mohsen Béchara, Archbishop of Antelias of the Maronites in Lebanon.

On 6 June 2008, Pope Benedict XVI accepted Gemayel's resignation due to limitations of age.
