= Our Lady of Grace Cathedral, Nicosia =

Church in Nicosia, Cyprus

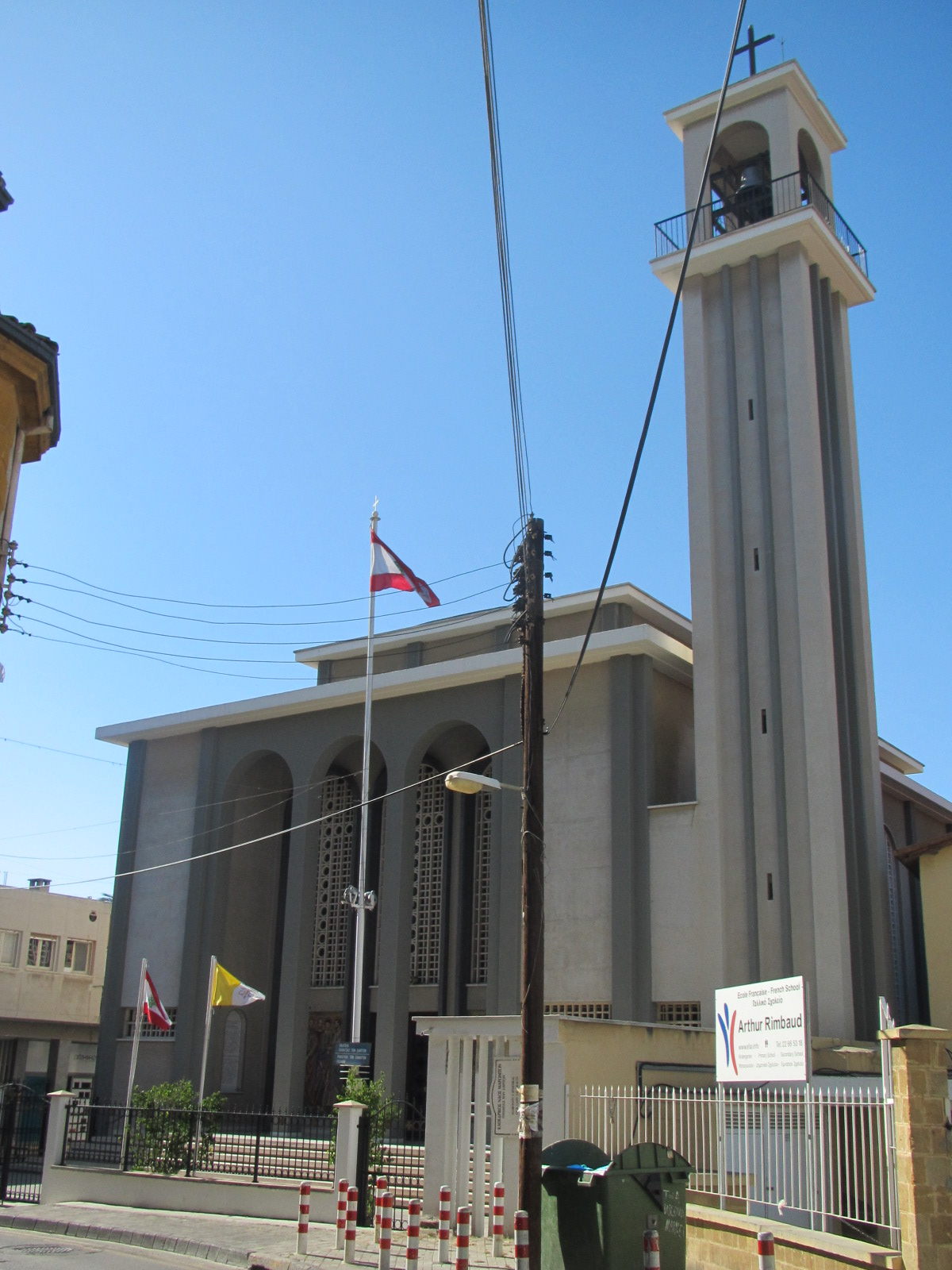
Our Lady of Grace Cathedral in Nicosia with the Lebanese and Vatican flags

Our Lady of Grace Cathedral is the main Maronite church of the city of Nicosia, in Cyprus, and is the cathedral of the Maronite Catholic Archeparchy of Cyprus.

== History ==
The first cathedral was dedicated to St. John, but during the Ottoman occupation it was turned into a mosque. The Lebanese Maronite community erected the church of Santa Croce, later entrusted to the Franciscans, and the current church of Our Lady of Grace is near to the Franciscan church. Only in 1960 was built the seat of the vicarage and the surrounding buildings.

On June 6, 2010 Pope Benedict XVI, the first pope to make an apostolic trip to the island, visited the cathedral of Nicosia.

== See also ==
- Lebanese people in Cyprus
