= Apostolic Vicariate of Burma =

Former Catholic missionary jurisdiction

The Apostolic Vicariate of Burma (nearly all its existence Apostolic Vicariate of Ava and Pegu) was a Latin Church missionary pre-diocesan jurisdiction of the Catholic Church in British Burma from 1741 until 1866.

== History ==
- 1741: Established as Apostolic Vicariate of Ava and Pegu, on colonial territory split off from the British Indian Diocese of São Tomé de Meliapor (now suppressed into Metropolitan Archdiocese of Madras and Mylapore)
- Renamed in 1856 as Apostolic Vicariate of Burma / Birmania (Curiate Italian), but never had an actual Ordinary of that title, just a single Apostolic administrator
- Suppressed on 1866.11.27, its territory being dismembered and reassigned to establish the then Apostolic Vicariate of Central Burma, Apostolic Vicariate of Southwestern Burma and Apostolic Vicariate of Eastern Burma)

== Ordinaries ==
Apostolic Vicars of Ava and Pegu

- Pio Gallizia, Barnabites (B.) (1741.01.25 – death 1745.03.23), Titular Bishop of Clysma (1741.01.25 – 1745.03.23)
- Paolo Antonio Nerini, B. (1753.11.16 – death 1756), Titular Bishop of Oreus (1753.11.16 – 1756)
- Benigno Avenati, B. (1764.08.22 – death 1765.09.27 not possessed), Titular Bishop of Arindela (1764.08.22 – 1765.09.27)
- Giovanni Maria Percoto, B. (1765.11.08 – death 1776.12.12), Titular Bishop of Maxula (1765.11.08 – 1776.12.12)
- Gherardo Cortenovis, B. (1778.01.28 – death 1780.05.05), Titular Bishop of Sozopolis (1778.01.28 – 1780.05.05)
- Gaetano Mantegazza, B. (1780.05.05 – death 1794.08.04), Titular Bishop of Maximianopolis (1778.06.25 – 1794.08.04); succeeding as former Coadjutor Vicar Apostolic of Ava and Pegu (1778.06.25 – 1780.05.05)
- Marcello Cortenovis, B. (1797.02.14 – death 1798.10.25), Titular Bishop of Sebastopolis (1797.02.14 – 1798.10.25)
- Frederic Cao, Piarists (Sch. P.) (1830.06.18 – retired 1841.07.11), Titular Bishop of Zama (1830.06.18 – death 1852.06.27)
- Giovanni Dominico Faustino Ceretti, Oblated of the Virgin Mary (O.M.V.) (1842.07.05 – retired 1846.12.26), Titular Bishop of Antæopolis (1842.07.05 – death 1855.12.25)
- Giovanni Antonio Balma, O.M.V. (1848.09.05 – 1855.09.09), Titular Bishop of Ptolemais (in Phoenicia) (1848.09.05 – 1871.10.27); later Metropolitan Archbishop of Cagliari (Italy) (1871.10.27 – death 1881.04.05)

Apostolic Vicariate of Burma

- Apostolic Administrator Paul Ambroise Bigandet, Paris Foreign Missions Society (M.E.P.) (1856 – 1866.11.27), while Coadjutor Apostolic Vicar of Western Siam (Malaysia) (1846.03.27 – 1866) and Titular Bishop of Ramata (1846.03.27 – 1894.03.13); later Apostolic Vicar of Southwestern Burma (Burma = Myanmar) (1866.11.27 – 1870.07.19), Apostolic Vicar of Southern Burma (1870.07.19 – 1894.03.13).

== See also ==
- List of Catholic dioceses in Myanmar
- Catholic Church in Myanmar#Ecclesiastical history of Burma
