= Joseph Mohsen Béchara =

Maronite archbishop (1935–2020)

- Archeparch of Antelias
- Native name: چوزيف محسن بشاره
- Church: Maronite Church
- Archdiocese: Archeparchy of Antelias
- In office: 11 June 1988 – 16 June 2012
- Predecessor: Archeparchy erected
- Successor: Camille Zaidan
- Previous post: Archeparch of Cyprus (1986-1988)

Orders
- Ordination: 19 April 1963
- Consecration: 18 May 1986 by Nasrallah Boutros Sfeir

Personal details
- Born: 19 March 1935 Arbet Kozhaya, Mandatory Lebanese Republic, French Empire
- Died: 9 June 2020 (aged 85)

Joseph Mohsen Béchara (19 March 1935 – 9 June 2020) was a Maronite archbishop of the Maronite Catholic Archeparchy of Cyprus and the Maronite Catholic Archeparchy of Antelias.

== Life ==
Joseph Mohsen Béchara received on 19 April 1963 the sacrament of ordination to the priesthood. On 4 April 1986, he was appointed by Pope John Paul II Archbishop of Archeparchy of Cyprus with headquarters in Nicosia. His episcopal ordination was on 18 May 1986 by the hands of the Maronite Patriarch of Antioch, Nasrallah Boutros Sfeir and his co-consecrators were the Archeparch of Jounieh, Chucrallah Harb, and the Auxiliary bishop of Antioch, Roland Aboujaoudé. On 11 June 1988, Béchara became the first Maronite Archbishop appointed to the Maronite Catholic Archeparchy of Antelias.

On 16 June 2012, Joseph Mohsen Béchara resigned for reasons of age from the Archbishopric of Antelias. He died on 9 June 2020 due to a fall he suffered.
