= Nasser Gemayel =

- Eparch Emeritus of Notre-Dame du Liban de Paris
- Native name: ناصر الجميل
- Church: Maronite Church
- Diocese: Eparchy of Notre-Dame du Liban de Paris
- In office: 21 July 2012 – 29 May 2024
- Predecessor: Eparchy erected

Orders
- Ordination: 30 August 1981
- Consecration: 30 August 2012 by Bechara Boutros al-Rahi

Personal details
- Born: 6 January 1951 (age 75) Aïn el Kharroubé (northeast of Bikfaya), Mount Lebanon Governorate, Lebanon

Nasser Gemayel (born 6 January 1951, in Ain-Kharroubé, Lebanon) is the first and most recent eparch of the Maronite Catholic Eparchy of Notre-Dame du Liban de Paris.

== Life ==
Gemayel was born in 1951 at Ain-Kharroubé in Antélias Archeparchy of the Maronites. He attended the seminar at Ghazir and, for some years, the Conservatory of Beirut, while he studied philosophy and theology at the University Institutional Holy Spirit University of Kaslik. He received from the same University and a licentiate in theology and at the Saint Joseph University in the philosophy of Beirut. In 1977 he obtained a masters in philosophy at the Catholic University of Lyon and in 1984 and a doctorate in literature and humanities at the Paris-Sorbonne University in Paris

He was ordained as a priest on 30 August 1981 for the Maronite Catholic Archeparchy of Antelias. Throughout his career, he has worked in various parishes, including "Notre Dame du Bon Secours" in Zalka from 1984 to 1985 and "Tues Shaaya" in Brummana from 1986 to 1992. He then became the pastor of "Saint Tekla" in Masqua from 1992 to 2000, followed by working at "Tues Shaaya" in Brummana from 2000 to 2003. He also worked at "Saint Joseph" in Maamarieh from 2003 to 2004 and worked in the parish of "Saint Jean" in Baouchrié from 2004 to 2005. He held the position of parish administrator at "Saint Joseph" in Ghabé from 2005 to 2006 and has been pastor of "Saint Tekla" in Masqua since then.

He has taught at several high schools, in some theological colleges and several universities. Gemayel is also the author of books about the Maronite Church.

Gemayel was a member of the Board of Councillors (2003–2004), the Council of Priests of dell'Arcieparchia Antélias (2003–2004), the Central Commission of the Maronite Patriarchal Synod and chaplain in various Catholic schools and Marian confraternities. He has published books on the Maronite Catholic Church. Apart from Arabic, Gemayel speaks French, English, Italian, German and Spanish. He is also an expert in the Syriac language.

His appointment as eparch of the Maronite Catholic Eparchy of Notre-Dame du Liban de Paris was announced on 21 July 2012. Maronite Patriarch of Antioch, Bechara Boutros al-Rahi, OMM, donated to him on 30 August of the same year the episcopal ordination. His co-consecrators were Camille Zaidan, Archbishop of the Maronite Catholic Archeparchy of Antelias, and Samir Mazloum, retired Curial bishop in Antioch. At the same time he was appointed the first Bishop and Apostolic Visitor Eparchial in Western and Northern Europe for the Maronite faithful. He had previously served as pastor of "Saint Tekla" in Masqua, Lebanon.
