= Maronite Catholic Archeparchy of Antelias =

Eastern Catholic archeparchy in Lebanon

Coordinates: 33.9153°N 35.5889°E

Archeparchy of Antelias (Maronite) Archieparchia Anteliensis Maronitarum

Location
- Country: Lebanon
- Ecclesiastical province: Immediately Subject to the Maronite Patriarch of Antioch
- Headquarters: Lebanon

Statistics
- Population: (as of 2012); 249,971
- Parishes: 93

Information
- Denomination: Eastern Catholic Churches
- Sui iuris church: Maronite Church
- Rite: West Syro-Antiochene Rite
- Established: June 11, 1988 (38 years ago)
- Cathedral: Saint Elias Cathedral

Current leadership
- Pope: Leo XIV
- Patriarch: Bechara Boutros al-Rahi
- Archeparch: Antoine Farès Bou Najem

Website
- http://anteliasdiocese.com/

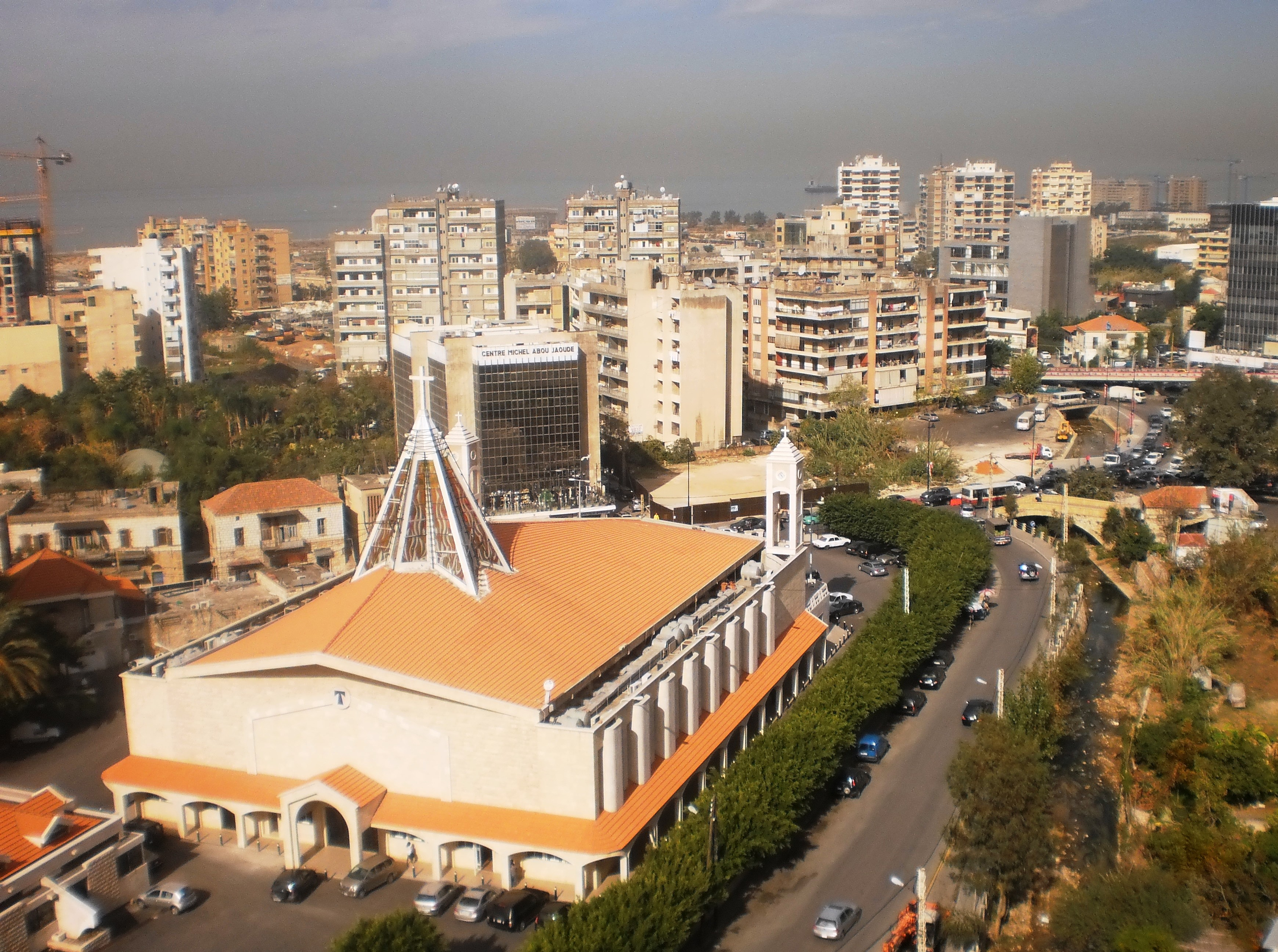
St. Elia Church

The Maronite Catholic Archeparchy of Antelias (informally Antelias of the Maronites) (in Latin: Archieparchia Anteliensis Maronitarum) is a Maronite (Antiochian Rite, Arabic), non-Metropolitan Archeparchy (Eastern Catholic Archdiocese) in northern Lebanon.

== Territory and statistics ==
It is immediately dependent on the Maronite Patriarch of Antioch. Its cathedral episcopal see is the Resurrection Cathedral, 5 km north of Beirut, in the Matn District, Lebanon, that is its jurisdiction.

The territory is divided into 93 parishes and in 2012 there were 249,971 Lebanese Maronite Catholic members.

== History ==
It was established on 11 June 1988 by the Synod of the Maronite Church on territory previously belonged to the Maronite Catholic Archeparchy of Cyprus.

== Eparchs ==
- Joseph Mohsen Béchara (11 June 1988 – retired 16 June 2012), previously Archeparch (Archbishop) of Cyprus of the Maronites (Cyprus) (1986.04.04 – 1988.06.11)
- Camille Zaidan (16 June 2012 – 21 October 2019), previously Titular Bishop of Ptolemais in Phœnicia of the Maronites (2011.08.13 – 2012.06.16), Bishop of Curia of the Maronites (2011.08.13 – 2012.06.16)
- Antoine Farès Bou Najem (3 March 2021 – present)

== Sources ==
- Annuario Pontificio, Libreria Editrice Vaticana, Città del Vaticano, 2003, ISBN 88-209-7422-3.
- Baalbek, Dictionnaire d’Histoire et de Géographie ecclésiastiques, vol. VI, Paris 1932, coll. 7–8.
