= Maronite Catholic Archeparchy of Cyprus =

Maronite Catholic ecclesiastical jurisdiction

Archeparchy of Cyprus Archeparchy Cyprensis Maronitarum
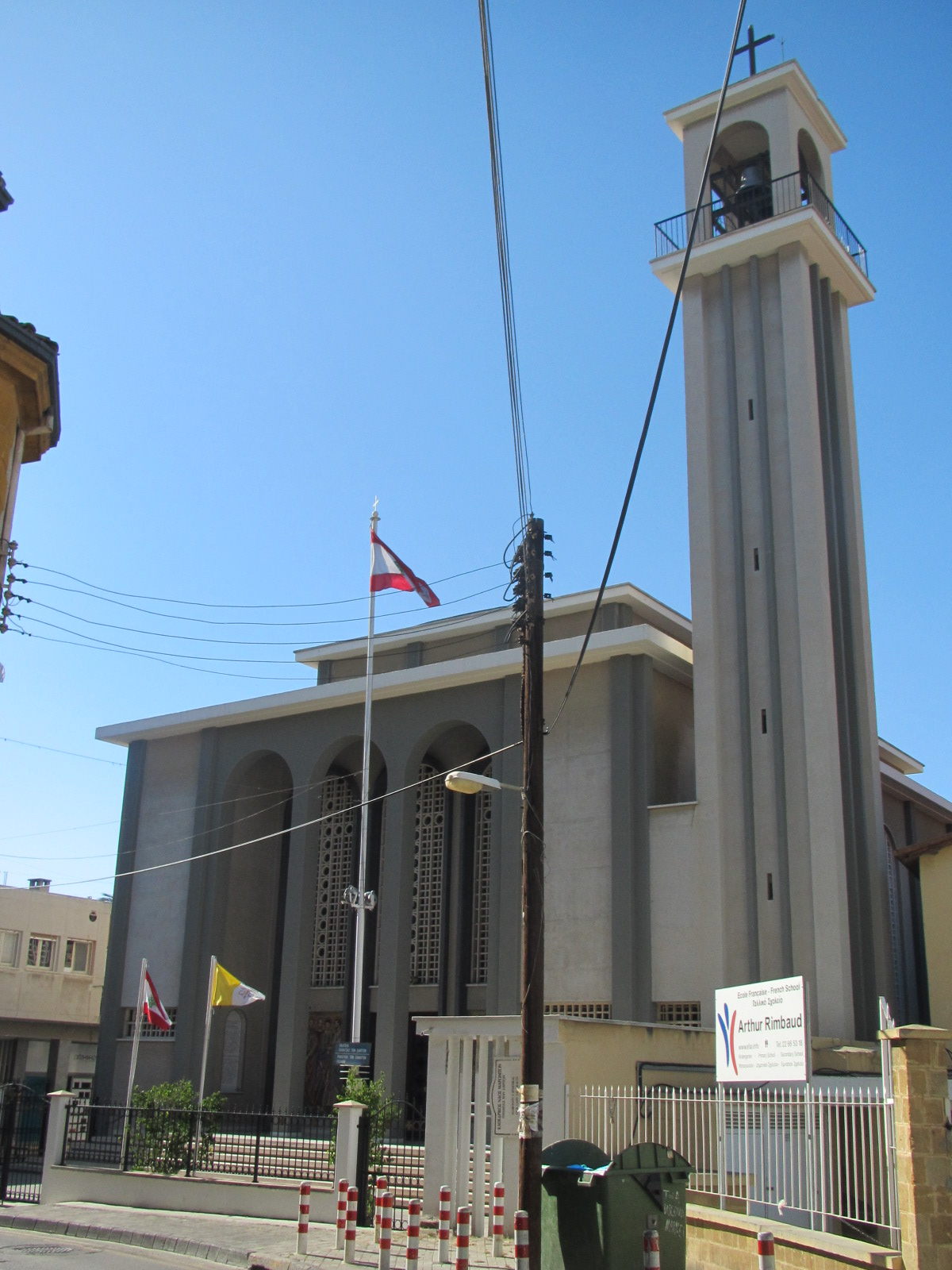
- Maronite Catholic Archeparchy of Cyprus with the Lebanese and Vatican flags

Location
- Country: Cyprus

Statistics
- Population: (as of 2013); 10,400
- Parishes: 12

Information
- Denomination: Catholic Church
- Sui iuris church: Maronite Church
- Rite: West Syro-Antiochene Rite
- Established: 1357
- Cathedral: Our Lady of Grace Cathedral, Nicosia
- Patron saint: Our Lady of Grace

Current leadership
- Pope: Leo XIV
- Patriarch: Bechara Boutros al-Rahi
- Archeparch: Selim Jean Sfeir

The Archeparchy of Cyprus (Latin: Archeparchy Cyprensis Maronitarum) is a seat of the Maronite Church immediately subject to the Holy See. It is currently ruled by Archeparch Selim Jean Sfeir.

== Territory and statistics ==
The archeparchy has jurisdiction over all the faithful Maronites of the island of Cyprus. Its arcieparchial seat is the city of Nicosia, where the Our Lady of Grace Cathedral is located.

The archeparchy at the end of 2013 out of a population of 838,897 people had 10,400 baptized, corresponding to 1.2% of the total. Its territory is divided into 12 parishes.

=== Parishes ===
- Parish of Our Lady of Grace in Nicosia
- Parish of Saint George in Kormakitis
- Parish of Saint Michael the Archangel in Αsomatos
- Parish of Saint Croix in Karpasha
- Parish of Saint Marina in Saint Marina
- Parish of Saint-Maron at Anthoupolis
- Parish of Saint-Marina of Kotsiatis
- Parish of Saint-Charbel in Limassol
- Parish of Saint Marina in Polemidia
- Parish of Saint Joseph in Larnaca
- Parish of Saint Kyriaki in Pafos

== History ==
The Maronite community of Lebanon arrived and settled in the northern part of Cyprus from the 9th to 12th centuries. The largest Maronite migrations were in 1224, 1570, 1596, 1776 and 1878.

A Cypriot Maronite community in communion with Rome was first reported in 1316 when a Maronite bishop, Hananya, who during Lusignan-rule took office in Cyprus. In 1357, the Maronite community with its bishop, professed to be of Catholic faith. This union was confirmed and reinforced by the Papal bull Benedictus sit Deus promulgated by Pope Eugene IV at the Council of Florence on August 7, 1455.

The Maronite community of Cyprus was the second largest community of Eastern Christians, after the Greeks. During the occupation of the island by officially Latin authorities – first the Lusignan and then the Venetians – the Maronites increased in number, thanks to the many properties and privileges granted to them by the new rulers of the island; they were present in sixty villages and, as estimated by Hackett, their number rose to around 180,000. In 1514, the Maronite Patriarch informed Pope Leo X about the machinations of and the seizure of Maronite churches by the Latin bishop of Nicosia.

The population of Maronites declined during Ottoman-rule in Cyprus (1571–1878) as Maronites were driven out of their villages, the churches were destroyed, and the bishop was forced from his episcopal see.

With the death of Bishop Luc, a Cypriot, in 1673 there were not Maronite bishop of Cyprus until 1878. The bishops of Cyprus visited the island sporadically, and the remaining Maronites were cared by Franciscans. In 1735 the Superior general of the Lebanese Maronite Order sent two monks to Cyprus, who built a school for the Maronite community, which was inaugurated in 1763 by the synod of Maronite bishops, because the seat of the Bishop of Cyprus should initially remain in Lebanon.

The archeparchy was canonically erected in the Maronite Synod of Mount Lebanon in 1736. Since the end of the 16th century, the Maronite bishops, who until then had always resided in Nicosia, began to live on the mainland and only returned to the island starting from the nineteenth century. In this period there were Latin priests to take care of the few Maronite on the island.

Following the 1974 Turkish invasion of Cyprus, most of the Maronite community chose to leave Northern Cyprus for the unoccupied south. In the city of Kormakitis, the heart of the community, all the churches and Christian religious buildings have been converted into other structures, becoming warehouses, museums, or mosques. Today, it is the center of the Maronite Christian community, with about 130 people. Two villages have been turned into military bases. There is only one church in the north where mass is regularly celebrated, dedicated to Saint George.

On 11 June 1988, the Synod of the Maronite Church divided the Eparchy into two: the Archeparchy of Cyprus and, in the Lebanese territory the Maronite Catholic Archeparchy of Antelias.

In 2003, Northern Cyprus unilaterally eased border restrictions, allow Maronites to legally cross the border southward for the first time in 30 years.

From 4 to 6 June 2010, Pope Benedict XVI made an apostolic visit to the Christian community of Cyprus. This was the first time a pope visited the island of Cyprus.

There are currently 11 communities that host a substantial Maronite presence: Nicosia (home of the archbishopric), Kormakitis, Asomatos, Ayia Marina, Karpasha, Anthoupolis, Kotsiatis, Limassol, Polemidia, Larnarca, Paphos.

Some of the Maronites of Cyprus still speak Cypriot Maronite Arabic.

== Bishops ==
- Hananya (mentioned in 1316)
- Youhanna (mentioned in 1357)
- Jacob Al-Matrity (mentioned in 1385)
- Elias (before 1431 – after 1445)
- Youssef (died 1505)
- Gabriel ibn al-Qilai (1505–1516)
- Maroun (1516–?)
- Antonios (mentioned in 1523)
- Girgis Hadthy (mentioned in 1528)
- Eliya Hadthy (mentioned in 1530)
- Francis (mentioned in 1531)
- Marcos El-Baytomini (mentioned in 1552)
- Girgiss (mentioned in 1562)
- Julios (mentioned in 1567)
- Youssef (died 1588)
- Youhanna (1588–1596)
- Moise Anaisi of Akura (1598–1614)
- Girgis Maroun al Hidnani (1614–1634)
- Elias to Hidnani (mentioned in 1652)
- Sarkis Al Jamri (1662–1668, died in office)
- Estephan El Douaihy (July 8, 1668 – May 1670, elected patriarch of Antioch)
- Luca of Carpasia (1671–1673)
- Boutros Doumit Makhlouf (1674–1681)
- Youssef (1682–1687)
- Gabriel Hawa, OLM (1723–1752)
- Tobias El Khazen (? – 28 March 1757, confirmed patriarch of Antioch)
- Elias El Gemayel (died 1786)
- Philip Gemayel (1786 succeeded – 14 June 1795, elected patriarch of Antioch)
- Abdullah Blibl (Abdalla Blaibel) (12 March 1798 – 1 March 1842, died in office)
- Joseph Giagia (26 December 1843 – 1878 resigned)
- Youssef Al Zoghbi (1883 – December 17, 1890, died in office)
- Nemtallah Selwan (June 12, 1892 – September 18, 1905, died in office)
- Boutros Al Zoghbi (February 11, 1906 – October 28, 1910, died in office)
- Boulos Awwad (February 11, 1911 – June 14, 1941, resigned)
- François Ayoub (November 28, 1942 – April 16, 1954, appointed Archbishop of Aleppo)
- Elie Farah (16 April 1954 – 4 April 1986, retired)
- Joseph Mohsen Béchara (April 4, 1986 – June 11, 1988 appointed Archbishop of Antelias)
- Boutros Gemayel (11 June 1988 – 29 October 2008, withdrawn)
- Joseph Soueif (29 October 2008 – 1 November 2020)
- Selim Jean Sfeir (since 19 June 2021)
