= Camille Zaidan =

Lebanese Maronite hierarch (1944–2019)

- Archeparch of Antelias
- Church: Maronite Church
- Archdiocese: Archeparchy of Antelias
- In office: 16 June 2012 – 21 October 2019
- Predecessor: Joseph Mohsen Béchara
- Successor: Antoine Farès Bou Najem
- Previous posts: Titular Eparch of Ptolemais in Phoenicia dei Maroniti (2011-2012); Curial Eparch of Antioch (2011-2012)

Orders
- Ordination: 23 October 1971
- Consecration: 23 September 2011 by Bechara Boutros al-Rahi

Personal details
- Born: 9 March 1944 Al-Qusaibah, South Governorate, Mandatory Lebanese Republic, French Empire
- Died: 21 October 2019 (aged 75) Matn District, Mount Lebanon Governorate, Lebanon

Camille Zaidan (9 March 1944 – 21 October 2019) was the Archeparch of the Maronite Catholic Archeparchy of Antelias in Lebanon.

== Life ==
Camille Zaidan received his ordination to the priesthood on 23 October 1971. On 6 June 2011, he was elected bishop by Synod of Maronite bishops in Antioch. Pope Benedict XVI confirmed on 13 August of the same year his nomination and appointed him titular bishop of Ptolemais in Phoenicia dei Maroniti.

Maronite Patriarch of Antioch, Bechara Boutros al-Rahi, OMM, ordained him bishop on 23 September of the same year and his co-consecrators were the Archeparch Emeritus of Antelias, Joseph Mohsen Béchara, and the Emeritus Curial Bishop of Antioch, Samir Mazloum.

In June 2012, the Synod of Bishops of the Maronite Church elected him Archbishop of Antelias. Pope Benedict XVI confirmed his appointment to the office on 16 June 2012.
