= Lúcio Ignácio Baumgaertner =

Catholic archbishop (1931–2023)

His Excellency Lúcio Ignácio Baumgaertner
- Archbishop Emeritus of Cascavel
- Appointed: 27 December 1995
- Term ended: 31 October 2007
- Predecessor: Armando Círio
- Successor: Mauro Aparecido dos Santos
- Previous post: Bishop of Toledo (1983–1995)

Orders
- Ordination: 1 December 1957
- Consecration: 12 October 1983 by Benedito Zorzi

Personal details
- Born: 2 September 1931 Nova Milano, Rio Grande do Sul, Brazil
- Died: 1 April 2023 (aged 91) Cascavel, Paraná, Brazil

Lúcio Ignácio Baumgaertner (2 September 1931 – 1 April 2023) was a Brazilian Roman Catholic prelate. He was bishop of Toledo from 1983 to 1995 and archbishop of Cascavel from 1995 to 2007.

Catholic Church titles
Preceded by Armando Círio	Archbishop of Cascavel; 1995–2023	Succeeded by Mauro Aparecido dos Santos
Preceded by Geraldo Majella Agnelo	Bishop of Toledo; 1983–1995	Succeeded by Anuar Battisti
