= Odilo =

Odilo may refer to:

- Saint Odilo of Cluny (born c.962), fifth Benedictine Abbot of Cluny
- Odilo, Duke of Bavaria (d. 748), son of Gotfrid of the house of Agilolfing
- Odilo Scherer, the Cardinal Archbishop of the Roman Catholic Archdiocese of São Paulo, Brazil
- Odilo Globocnik, Austrian Nazi leader and Holocaust perpetrator
