= Diocese of Toledo =

The Diocese of Toledo may refer to:

- Roman Catholic Diocese of Toledo, Brazil
- Roman Catholic Diocese of Toledo, United States
- Roman Catholic Archdiocese of Toledo, Spain
