= Diocese of Foz do Iguaçu =

Catholic ecclesiastical territory

Coordinates: 25.5469°S 54.5869°W

Diocese of Foz do Iguaçu Dioecesis Iguassuensis Diocese de Foz do Iguaçu

Location
- Country: Brazil
- Ecclesiastical province: Cascavel
- Metropolitan: Cascavel

Statistics
- Area: 6,822 km^{2} (2,634 sq mi)
- Population: Total; Catholics: (as of 2013); 521,000; 413,000 (79.3%)

Information
- Rite: Latin Rite
- Established: 10 May 1926 (100 years ago)

Current leadership
- Pope: Leo XIV
- Bishop: Sérgio de Deus Borges
- Metropolitan Archbishop: José Mário Scalon Angonese

Website
- Website of the Diocese

The Roman Catholic Diocese of Foz do Iguaçu (Latin: Dioecesis Iguassuensis) is a diocese located in the city of Foz do Iguaçu in the ecclesiastical province of Cascavel in Brazil.

== History ==
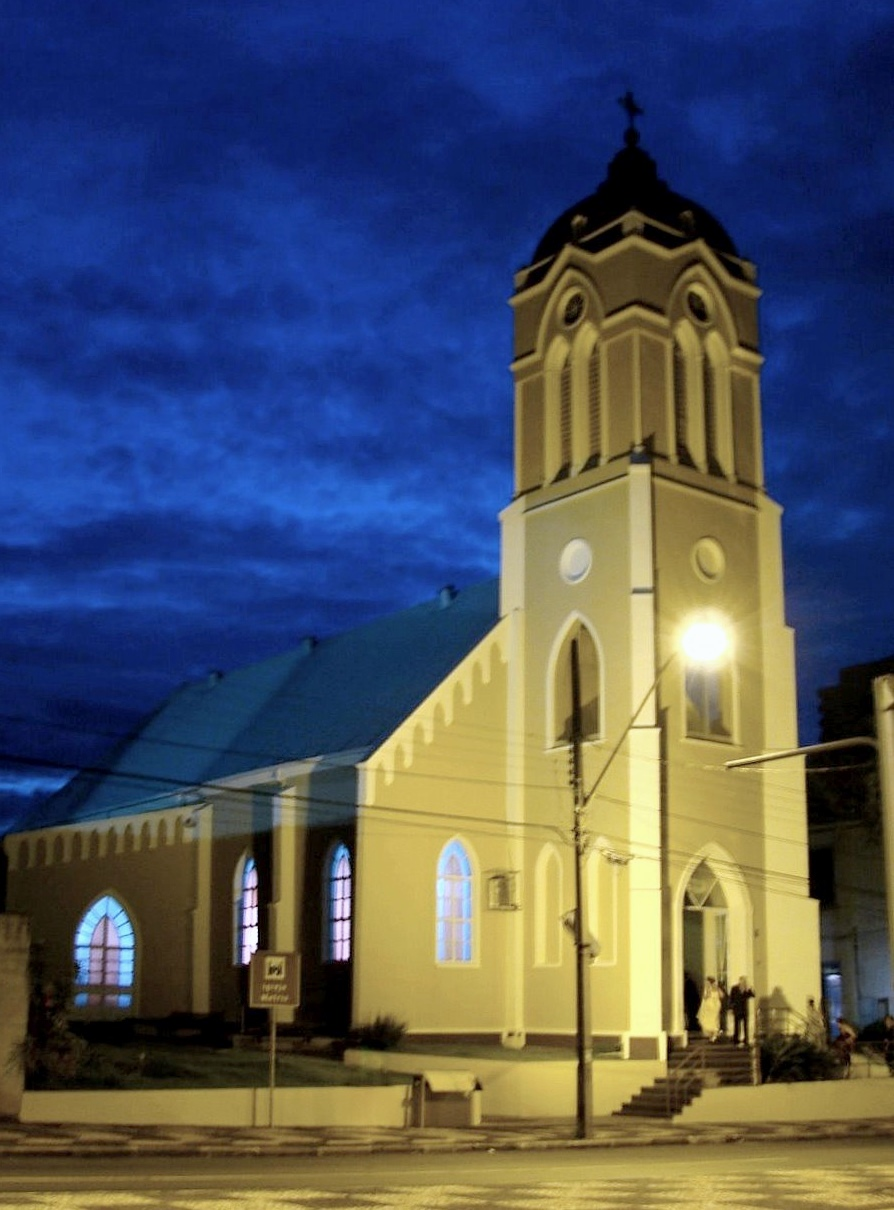
The old cathedral of Foz do Iguaçu, the main church of St John the Baptist.

- May 10, 1926: Established as Territorial Prelature of Foz do Iguaçu from the Diocese of Curitiba
- 1959: Suppressed (to Diocese of Campo Mourão and Diocese of Toledo)
- May 5, 1978: Restored as Diocese of Foz do Iguaçu from the Diocese of Toledo

== Leadership ==
=== Ordinaries, in reverse chronological order ===
- Bishops of Foz do Iguaçu (Roman rite)
  - Bishop Sérgio de Deus Borges (2019.09.07 – ...)
  - Bishop Dirceu Vegini (2010.10.20 – 2018.09.29)
  - Bishop Laurindo Guizzardi, C.S. (1982.02.12 – 2010.10.20)
  - Bishop Olívio Aurélio Fazza, S.V.D. (1978.05.05 – 2001.11.28)
- Prelates of Foz do Iguaçu (Roman Rite)
  - Bishop Manoel Könner, S.V.D. (1947.12.13 – 1959.06.20)
  - Fr. Manoel Könner, S.V.D. (later Bishop) (Apostolic Administrator 1940.02.17 – 1947.12.13)
