= Our Lady of Apparition Cathedral, Cascavel =

Metropolitan Cathedral of Our Lady of Apparition
- Catedral Metropolitana Nossa Senhora Aparecida
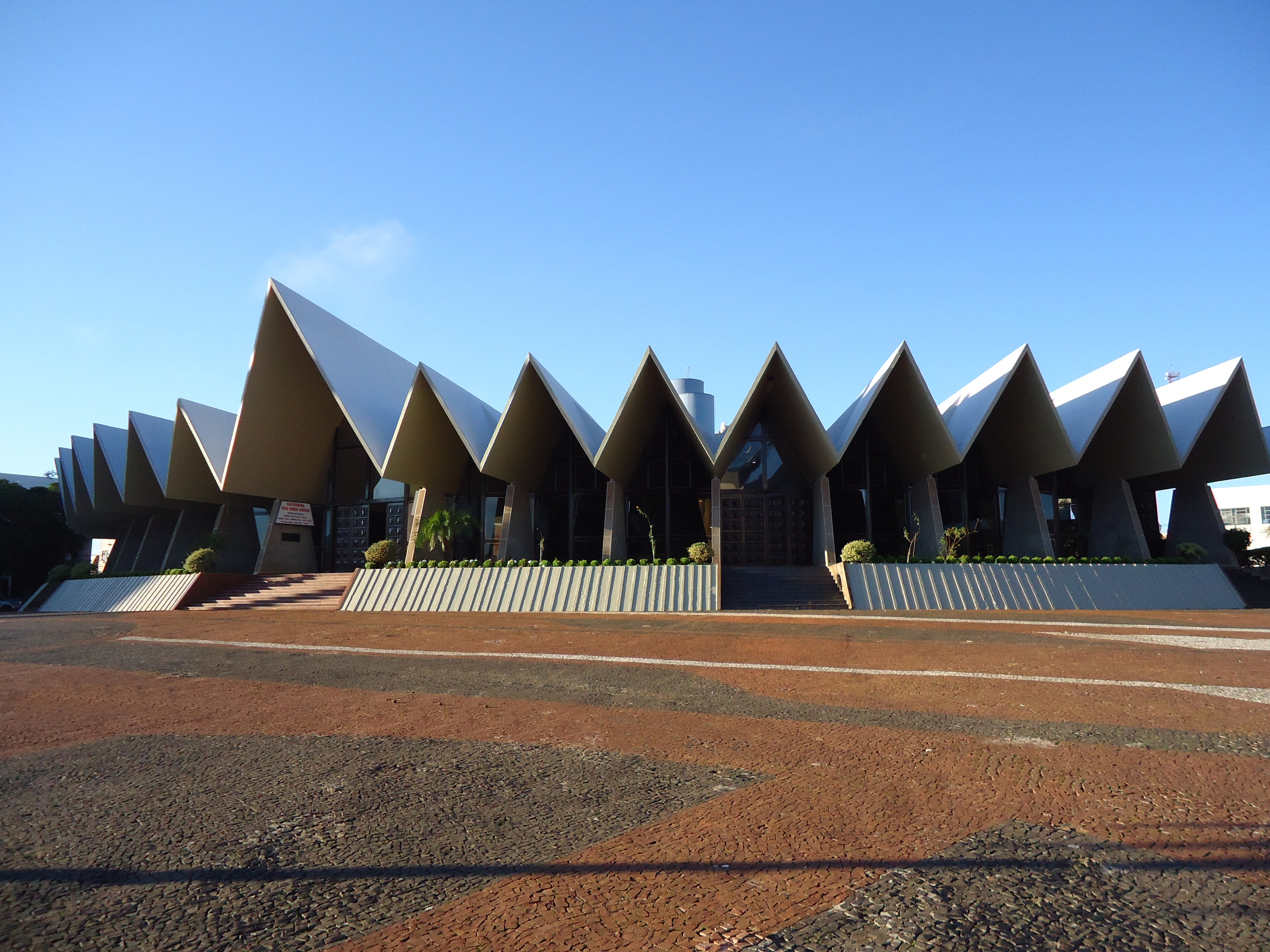
- Metropolitan Cathedral of Our Lady of Apparition
- 24°57′22″S 53°27′20″W
- Location: Cascavel
- Country: Brazil
- Denomination: Roman Catholic Church

Administration
- Archdiocese: Roman Catholic Archdiocese of Cascavel

The Metropolitan Cathedral of Our Lady of Apparition (Portuguese: Catedral Metropolitana Nossa Senhora Aparecida), also known as Cascavel Cathedral, is a Roman Catholic church and cathedral of the Archdiocese of Cascavel, in the state of Paraná in Brazil.

On 10 June 1952 the parish of Our Lady of Apparition was created, who became official patron of the municipality by law 201/62.

The building's construction, between Brasil Avenue and Rio Grande South Street, began in 1974, after the solemn transport of the sacred image of the old church (located to the right of the current cathedral), with the aim of being the new cathedral of the municipality.

On 5 May 1978, with the work finished, the Diocese of Cascavel was created, of which the church became the parish church and cathedral. On 16 October 1979, the diocese was elevated to an archdiocese and the church to metropolitan cathedral.

== See also ==
- List of cathedrals in Brazil
- Roman Catholicism in Brazil

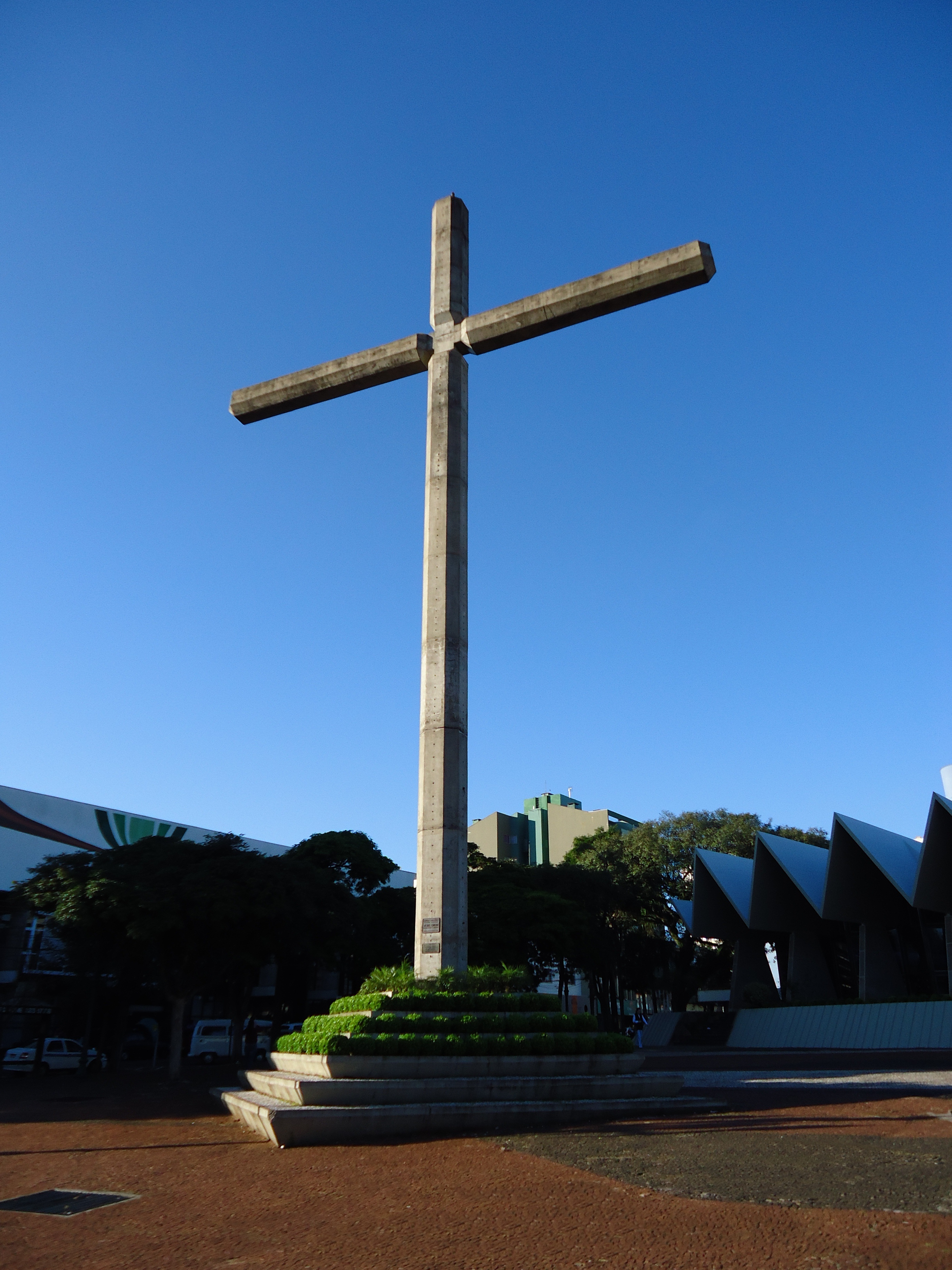
Concrete cross
