= Geraldo Majella Agnelo =

Brazilian Roman Catholic cardinal (1933–2023)

His Eminence Geraldo Majella Agnelo
- Cardinal; Archbishop of São Salvador da Bahia; Primate of Brazil
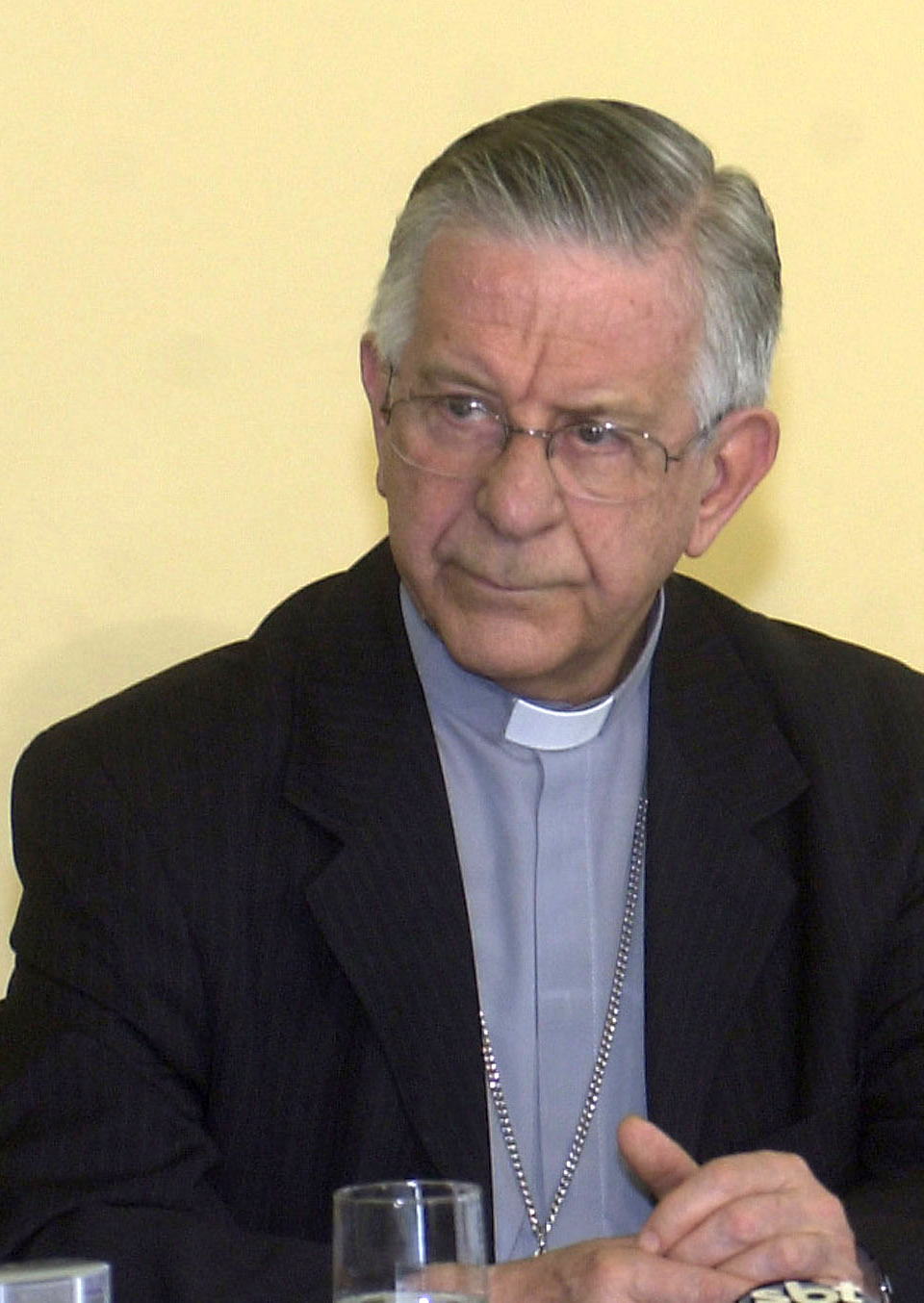
- Agnelo in 2006
- Church: Roman Catholic Church
- Archdiocese: São Salvador da Bahia
- See: São Salvador da Bahia
- Appointed: 13 January 1999
- Installed: 11 March 1999
- Term ended: 12 January 2011
- Predecessor: Lucas Moreira Neves
- Successor: Murilo Sebastião Ramos Krieger
- Other post: Cardinal-Priest of San Gregorio Magno alla Magliana Nuova (2001–2023)
- Previous posts: Bishop of Toledo (1978–1982); Archbishop of Londrina (1982–1991); Secretary of the Congregation for Divine Worship and the Discipline of the Sacraments (1991–1999); Second Vice-President of the Latin American Episcopal Council (1999–2003); President of the Brazilian Episcopal Conference (2003–2007)

Orders
- Ordination: 29 June 1957 by Antônio Maria Alves de Siqueira
- Consecration: 6 August 1978 by Paulo Evaristo Arns
- Created cardinal: 21 February 2001 by Pope John Paul II
- Rank: Cardinal-Priest

Personal details
- Born: 19 October 1933 Juiz de Fora, Minas Gerais, Brazil
- Died: 26 August 2023 (aged 89) Londrina, Paraná, Brazil
- Denomination: Roman Catholic
- Education: University of Mogi das Cruzes; Central Seminary of Ipiranga; Pontifical Athenaeum of Saint Anselm
- Motto: Caritas cum Fide
- Coat of arms

Geraldo Majella Agnelo (19 October 1933 – 26 August 2023) was a Brazilian prelate of the Catholic Church who was archbishop of São Salvador da Bahia from 1999 to 2011. He became a bishop in 1978 and served as bishop of Toledo from 1978 to 1982 and archbishop of Londrina from 1982 to 1991. He served in the Roman Curia as secretary of the Congregation for Divine Worship and the Discipline of the Sacraments from 1991 to 1999.

Agnelo was raised to the rank of cardinal in 2001.

== Early life and ordination ==
Geraldo Majella Agnelo was born in Juiz de Fora on 19 October 1933. He was ordained for the Archdiocese of São Paulo on 29 June 1957, and held a doctorate in liturgy from the Pontifical Athenaeum of Saint Anselm in Rome.

Agnelo was director of the philosophical seminary, Aparecida. He was spiritual director and professor at Immaculate Conception Seminary, Ipiranga. He was professor of liturgical and sacramental theology at Pius XI Theological Institute, and rector of Our Lady of the Assumption Seminary.

== Bishop ==
On 5 May 1978, Agnelo was appointed the second Bishop of Toledo, Paraná, and was consecrated on 6 August. On 4 October 1982, he was promoted to Archbishop of Londrina. Agnelo was President of the Brazilian Bishops' Liturgical Commission. On 16 September 1991, he was appointed Secretary of the Congregation for Divine Worship and the Discipline of the Sacraments. Agnelo was named Archbishop of São Salvador da Bahia on 13 January 1999.

== Cardinal ==
Styles of Geraldo Majella Agnelo
- Reference style: His Eminence
- Spoken style: Your Eminence
- Informal style: Cardinal
- See: São Salvador da Bahia

In May 1999 Agnelo was nominated Vice President of the General Conference of Latin American Bishops (CELAM). He was Elected president of the National Conference of Brazilian Bishops in May 2003, and was made Cardinal-Priest of San Gregorio Magno alla Magliana Nuova (St. Gregory the Great at Magliana Nuova) by Pope John Paul II in the consistory of 21 February 2001.

Agnelo was one of the cardinal electors who participated in the 2005 papal conclave that elected Pope Benedict XVI, and he was considered papabile at the time.

Agnelo resigned as Archbishop of São Salvador da Bahia on 12 January 2011 and was succeeded by Murilo Sebastião Ramos Krieger.

Agnelo was one of the cardinal electors who participated in the 2013 papal conclave that elected Pope Francis. He was also a member of the Pontifical Council for the Pastoral Care of Migrants and Itinerants and the Pontifical Commission for the Cultural Heritage of the Church.

== Illness and death ==
Agnelo suffered a stroke in December 2022 and was in poor health thereafter. By 25 August 2023 his condition had rapidly deteriorated and he was in intensive care. Agnelo died at dawn in Londrina on 26 August 2023. He was 89.

== Views ==
=== 2005 conclave ===
In April 2005, he said that he was very happy at the selection of Cardinal Joseph Ratzinger as the new Pope of the Catholic Church.

=== Catholic-Lutheran dialogue ===
Agnelo supported efforts to improve dialogue between Lutherans and Catholics.

=== Abortion ===
Cardinal Agnelo expressed concern with Brazilian politicians over a plan to legalize abortion in the country.

Catholic Church titles
Preceded by Armando Círio	Bishop of Toledo; 5 May 1978 – 4 October 1982	Succeeded by Lúcio Ignácio Baumgaertner
Preceded by Geraldo Fernandes Bijos	Archbishop of Londrina; 4 October 1982 – 16 September 1991	Succeeded by Albano Bortoletto Cavallin
Preceded by Lajos Kada	Secretary of Congregation for Divine Worship and the Discipline of the Sacraments; 16 September 1991 – 13 January 1999	Succeeded by Francesco Pio Tamburrino
Preceded by Jaime Lucas Ortega y Alamino	Second Vice-President of the Latin American Episcopal Council; 1999–2003	Succeeded by Geraldo Lyrio Rocha
Preceded by Lucas Moreira Neves	Archbishop of São Salvador da Bahia; 13 January 1999 – 12 January 2011	Succeeded by Murilo Sebastião Ramos Krieger
Titular church created	Cardinal Priest of San Gregorio Magno alla Magliana Nuova; 21 February 2001 – 26 August 2023	Vacant
Preceded by Jayme Henrique Chemello	President of the Brazilian Episcopal Conference; May 2003 – May 2007	Succeeded by Geraldo Lyrio Rocha
Order of precedence
Preceded by Geraldo Alckmin as Vice President of Brazil	Brazilian order of precedence 3rd in line as Brazilian cardinal	Followed by Foreign ambassadors
