= Carlos Kluwe =

Brazilian footballer and physician (1890–1966)

Carlos Kluwe (January 3, 1890 – September 16, 1966) was a Brazilian footballer and physician who played for Sport Club Internacional.

Kluwe was born and died in Bagé, and was mayor of the town between 1948 and 1951.

== Career ==
- Sport Club Internacional: 1909–1919
