= Mauro Aparecido dos Santos =

Brazilian archbishop (1954–2021)

His Eminence Mauro Aparecido dos Santos
- Archbishop of Cascavel
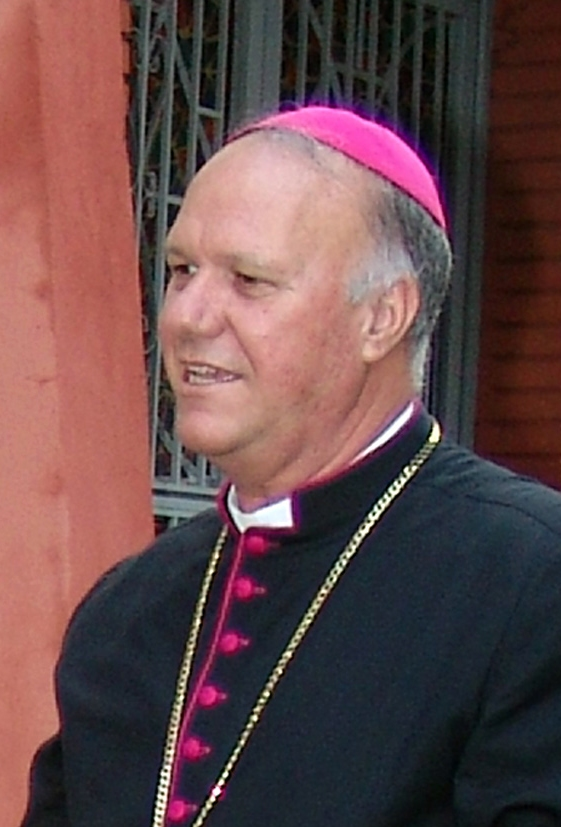
- Church: Roman Catholic Church
- Appointed: 31 October 2007
- Installed: 25 January 2008
- Term ended: 11 March 2021
- Predecessor: Lúcio Ignácio Baumgaertner
- Other post: Bishop of Campo Mourão
- Previous post: Bishop of Campo Mourão (1998–2007)

Orders
- Ordination: 13 May 1984
- Consecration: 14 August 1998

Personal details
- Born: 9 November 1954 Fartura, São Paulo, Brazil
- Died: 11 March 2021 (aged 66) Cascavel, Paraná, Brazil

Mauro Aparecido dos Santos (9 November 1954 – 11 March 2021) was a Brazilian Catholic cleric and metropolitan archbishop of Cascavel.

== Career ==
Mauro Aparecido majored in philosophy and theology at Jacarezinho. On 13 May 1984, his priestly ordination took place in the same municipality. Between 11 January 1992 and 31 January 1997, dos Santos served as parish priest at Santa Terezinha do Menino Jesus Parish, in Bandeirantes. Between 2 February 1995 and 31 July 1998 he was the vicar general of the Diocese of Jacarezinho. On 2 February 1997 he became pastor of the Immaculate Conception-Cathedral of Jacarezinho Parish.

His episcopal ordination took place on 14 August 1998, in Jacarezinho. On 30 August, dos Santos took office as the third bishop of the Diocese of Campo Mourão.

He was Apostolic Administrator of the Diocese of Umuarama between 9 May 2002 and 13 December 2002.

On 31 October 2007 dos Santos was appointed Archbishop of Cascavel and took office on 25 January 2008.

On 11 March 2021, Dom Mauro died from complications from COVID-19 during the COVID-19 pandemic in Brazil.
