= Olívio Aurélio Fazza =

Catholic bishop

Olívio Aurélio Fazza SVD
- Bishop of Foz do Iguaçu
- Church: Catholic Church
- Diocese: Diocese of Foz do Iguaçu
- In office: 5 May 1978 – 20 November 2001
- Predecessor: Manuel Könner
- Successor: Laurindo Guizzardi

Orders
- Ordination: 5 March 1955
- Consecration: 12 August 1978 by Geraldo Maria de Morais Penido

Personal details
- Born: 25 June 1925 Juiz de Fora, Minas Gerais, Republic of the United States of Brazil
- Died: 25 December 2008 (aged 83) Foz do Iguacu, Paraná, Brazil

Olívio Aurélio Fazza (June 25, 1925 – December 25, 2008) was a Brazilian Bishop of the Roman Catholic Church. He was born in Juiz de Fora.

At the age of 29, Fazza was ordained as a priest. On May 5, 1978 he was appointed as Bishop of Foz do Iguaçu, he was ordained on August 12. He retired on November 28, 2001 and was succeeded by Laurindo Guizzardi.

He died in Foz do Iguacu, aged 83.
