= Sant'Andrea al Quirinale =

Church of Saint Andrew on the Quirinal
- Sant'Andrea al Quirinale (Italian); S. Andreae in Quirinali (Latin)
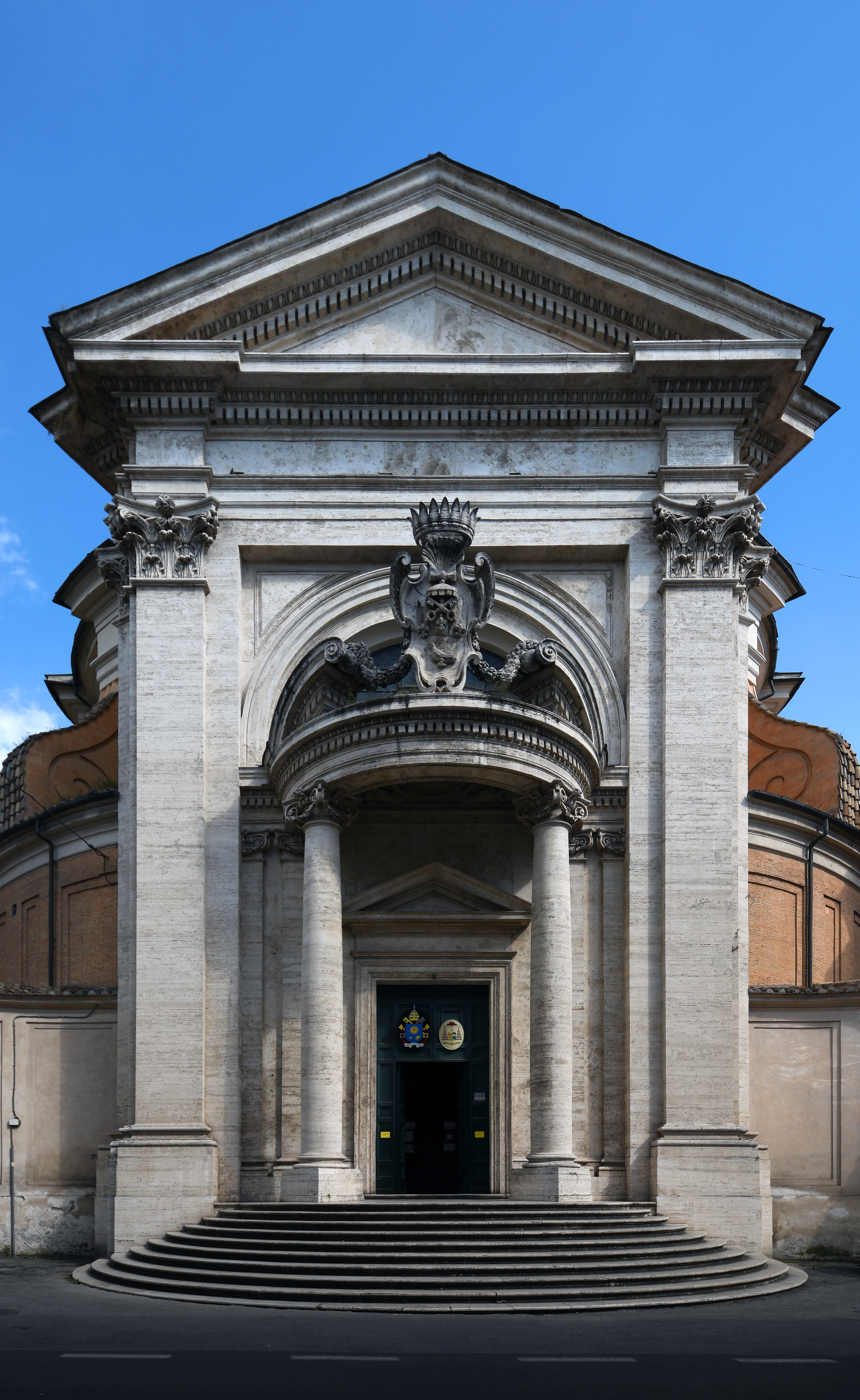
- Façade of Sant'Andrea al Quirinale, bearing the arms of Cardinal Camillo Francesco Maria Pamphili.
- Click on the map to see marker.
- 41°54′02″N 12°29′22″E
- Location: 30 Via del Quirinale; Rome
- Country: Italy
- Denomination: Catholic
- Website: Official website

History
- Status: Rectory church, Titulus
- Dedication: Andrew the Apostle

Architecture
- Architect: Gian Lorenzo Bernini
- Style: Baroque
- Groundbreaking: 1658
- Completed: 1670

Administration
- Diocese: Rome

The Church of Saint Andrew on the Quirinal (Italian: Sant'Andrea al Quirinale, Latin: S. Andreae in Quirinali) is a Roman Catholic titular church in Rome, Italy, built for the Jesuit seminary on the Quirinal Hill.

The church of Sant'Andrea, an important example of Roman Baroque architecture, was designed by Gian Lorenzo Bernini with Giovanni de'Rossi.

== History ==
Bernini received the commission in 1658 and the church was constructed by 1661, although the interior decoration was not finished until 1670. The site previously accommodated a 16th-century church, Sant'Andrea a Montecavallo.

Commissioned by former Cardinal Camillo Francesco Maria Pamphili, with the approval of Pope Alexander VII, Sant'Andrea was the third Jesuit church constructed in Rome, after the Church of the Gesù and Sant'Ignazio. It was to serve the Jesuit novitiate, which was founded in 1566. Bernini considered the church one of his most perfect works; his son, Domenico, recalled that in his later years, Bernini spent hours sitting inside it, appreciating what he had achieved.

The French dramatist Victorien Sardou set the first act of his play La Tosca in the church.

It has served as the titular church of Brazilian Cardinal Odilo Scherer since 2007.

== Exterior ==
The main façade of the church faces onto the Via del Quirinale (formerly the Via Pia), as does Borromini's San Carlo alle Quattro Fontane further down the road. Unlike San Carlo, Sant’Andrea is set back from the street and the space outside the church is enclosed by low curved quadrant walls. An oval cylinder encases the dome, and large volutes transfer the lateral thrust. The main façade to the street has an aedicular pedimented frame at the center of which a semicircular porch with two Ionic columns marks the main entrance. Above the porch entablature is the heraldic coat of arms of the Pamphili patron.

== Interior ==
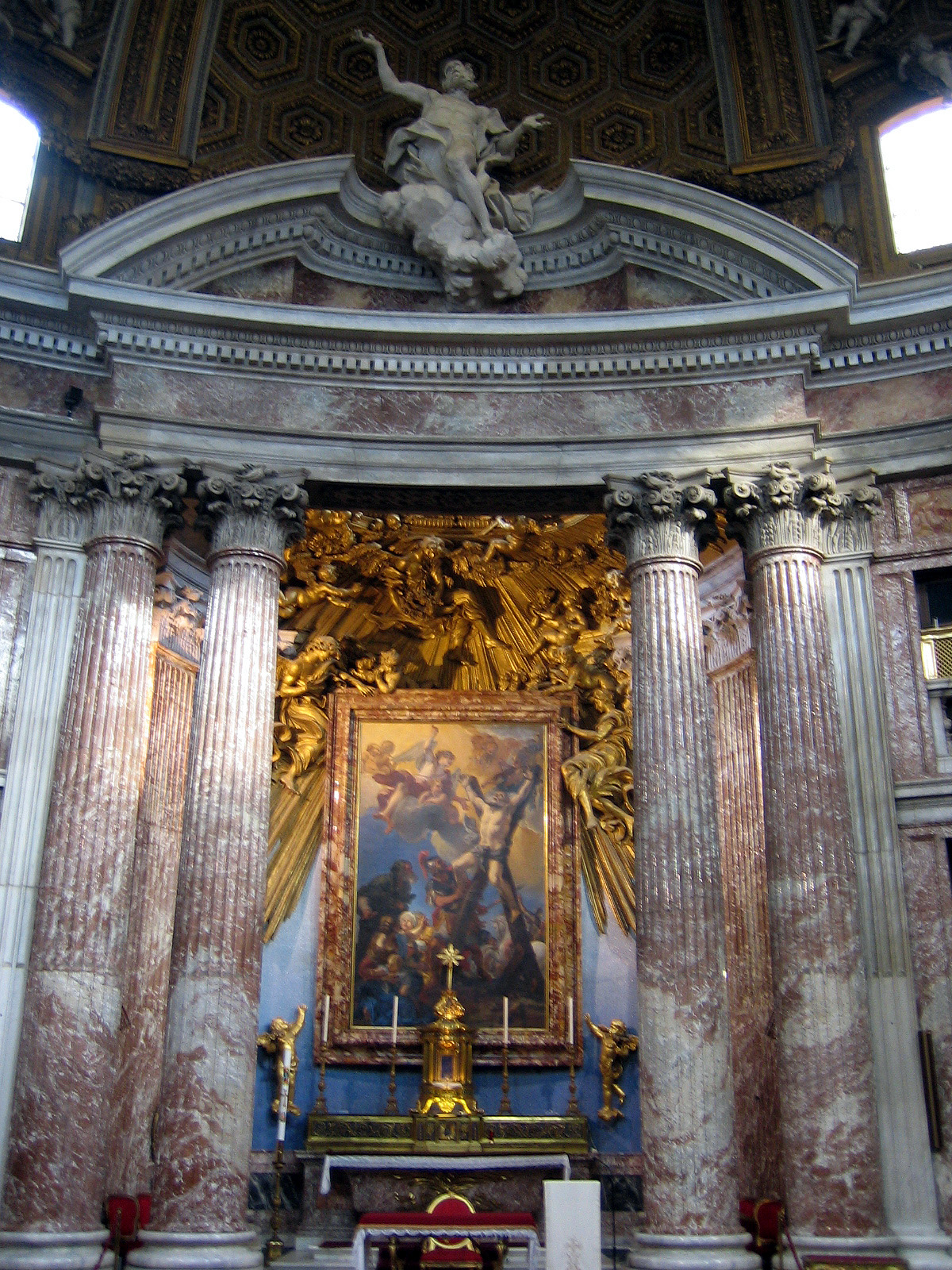
Main altar - Martyrdom of Saint Andrew (1668) by Guillaume Courtois.

Inside, the main entrance is located on the short axis of the church and directly faces the high altar. The oval form of the main congregational space of the church is defined by the wall, pilasters and entablature, which frame the side chapels, and the golden dome above. Large paired columns supporting a curved pediment differentiate the recessed space of the high altar from the congregational space.

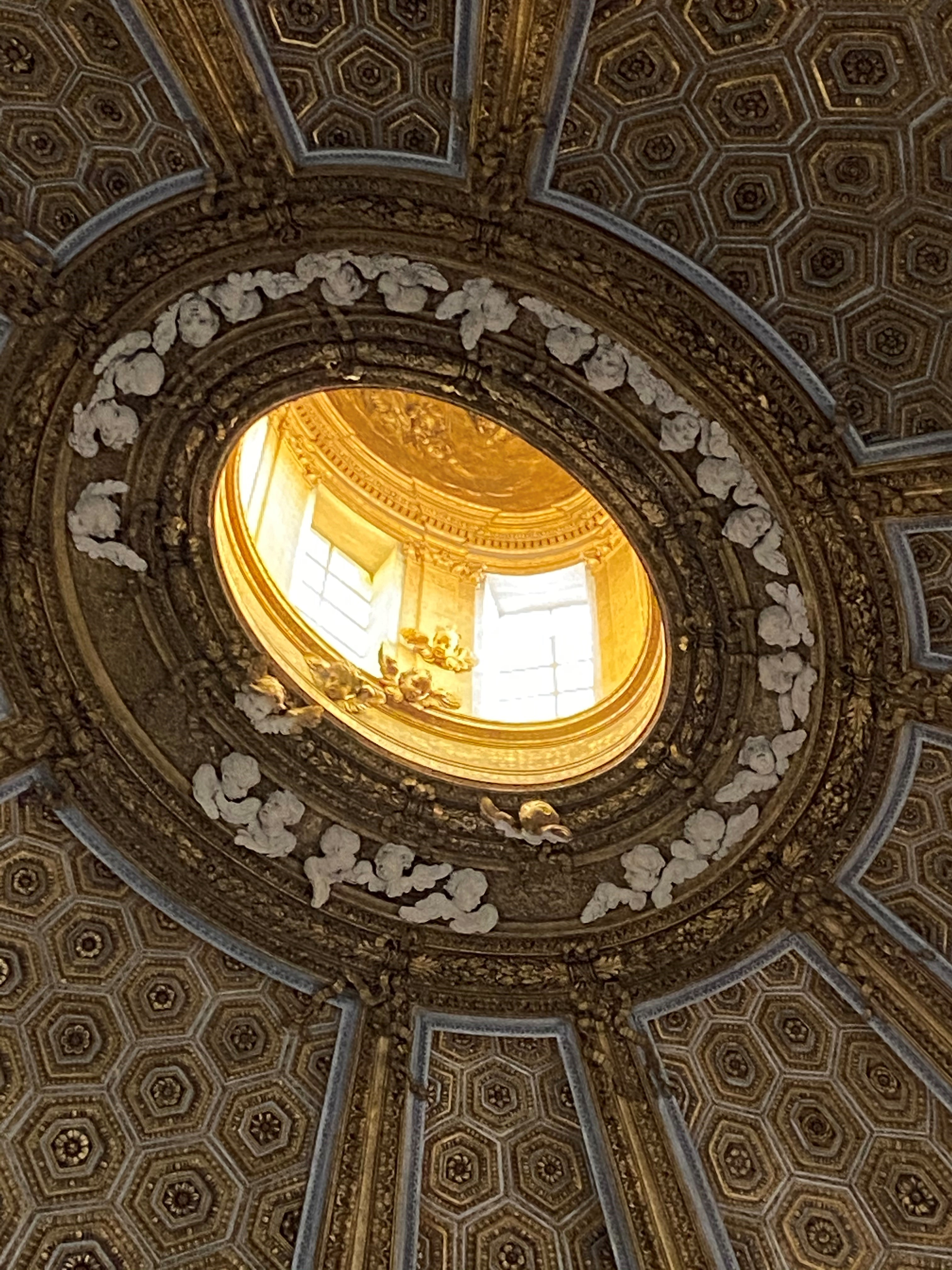
The Lantern at Sant’Andrea al Quirinale

In contrast to the dark side chapels, the high altar niche is well lit from a hidden source and becomes the main visual focus of the lower part of the interior. As a result, the congregation effectively become ‘witnesses’ to the theatrical narrative of St Andrew which begins in the High Altar chapel and culminates in the dome.

Over the High Altar is an oil painting of the Martyrdom of Saint Andrew (1668) by French painter Guillaume Courtois, a depiction which shows Andrew tied to the diagonals of the form of the cross on which he was crucified. Andrew appears for a second time as if he were breaking through the curved pediment of the edicule frame to the high altar; this time he is represented by a white stucco sculpture carved by Antonio Raggi. He is shown on a cloud, designating a heavenly appearance, and, with his arm outstretched and gaze cast upwards, he indicates that he is on his way to heaven as represented by the golden dome, the stucco cherubim heads clustered around the opening to the lantern, and the lantern vault with the Dove of the Holy Ghost. This dramatic visual narrative is sustained not only upwards through the space of the church but employs different artistic modes. Bernini combined painting, sculpture and architecture into a synthesis to create visually the idea of the apotheosis of St Andrew in this spiritual theater. He used a similar synthesis of artistic modes in his design of the Ecstasy of Saint Theresa in the Cornaro Chapel of Santa Maria della Vittoria. This synthesis has been referred to as the ‘unity of the visual arts’.

=== Chapels ===
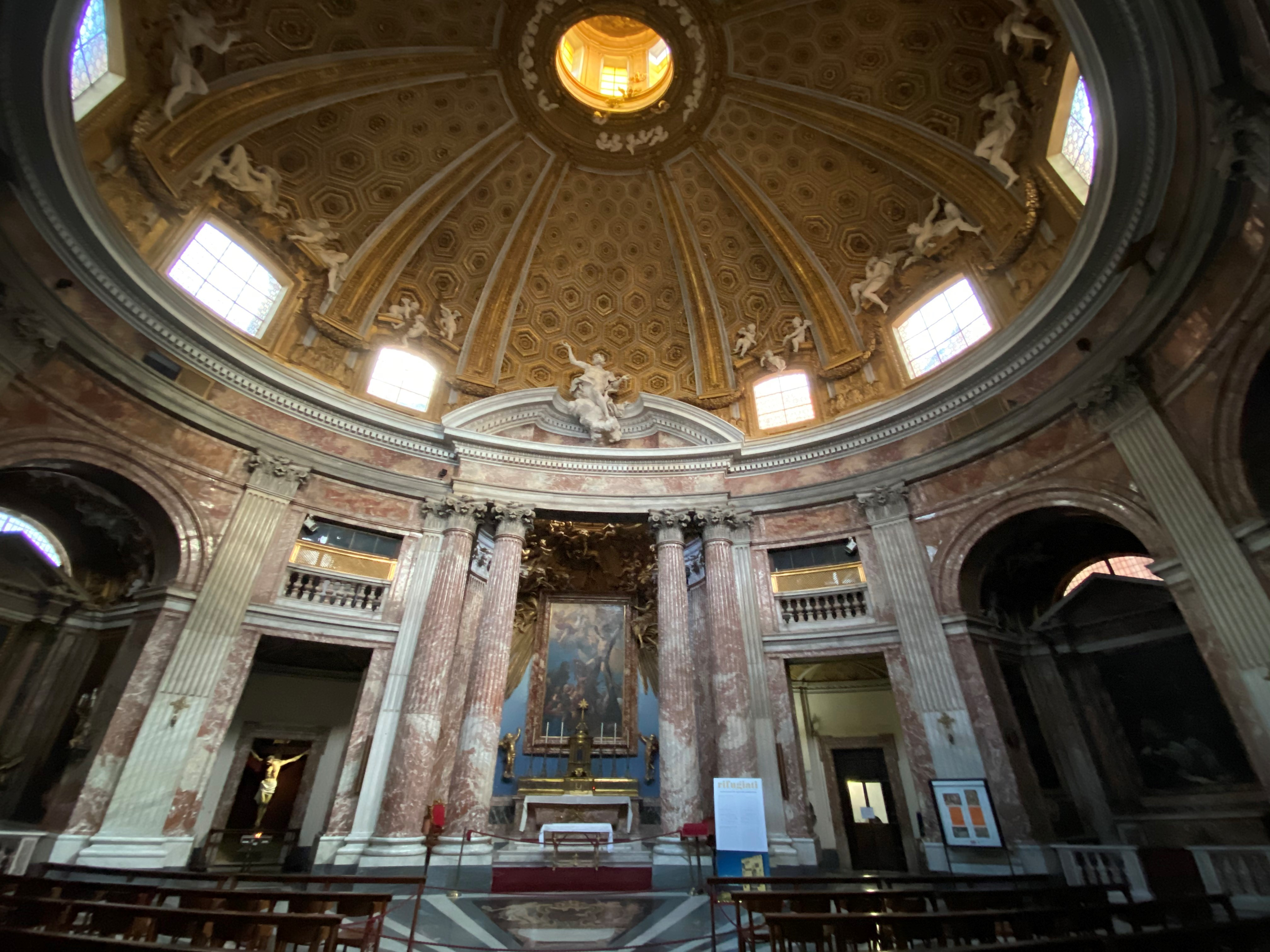
Main altar - Martyrdom of Saint Andrew (1668) including dome, side chapels, and lantern

Floor map - Legend: (1) Main entrance, (2) Chapel of Saint Francis Xavier, (3) Chapel of the Passion, (4) Chapel Saint Stanislas Kostka, (5) Chapel of Saint Ignatius of Loyola, (6) Main altar, (7) Entrance to novitiate and access to the rooms of Saint Stanislas Kostka.

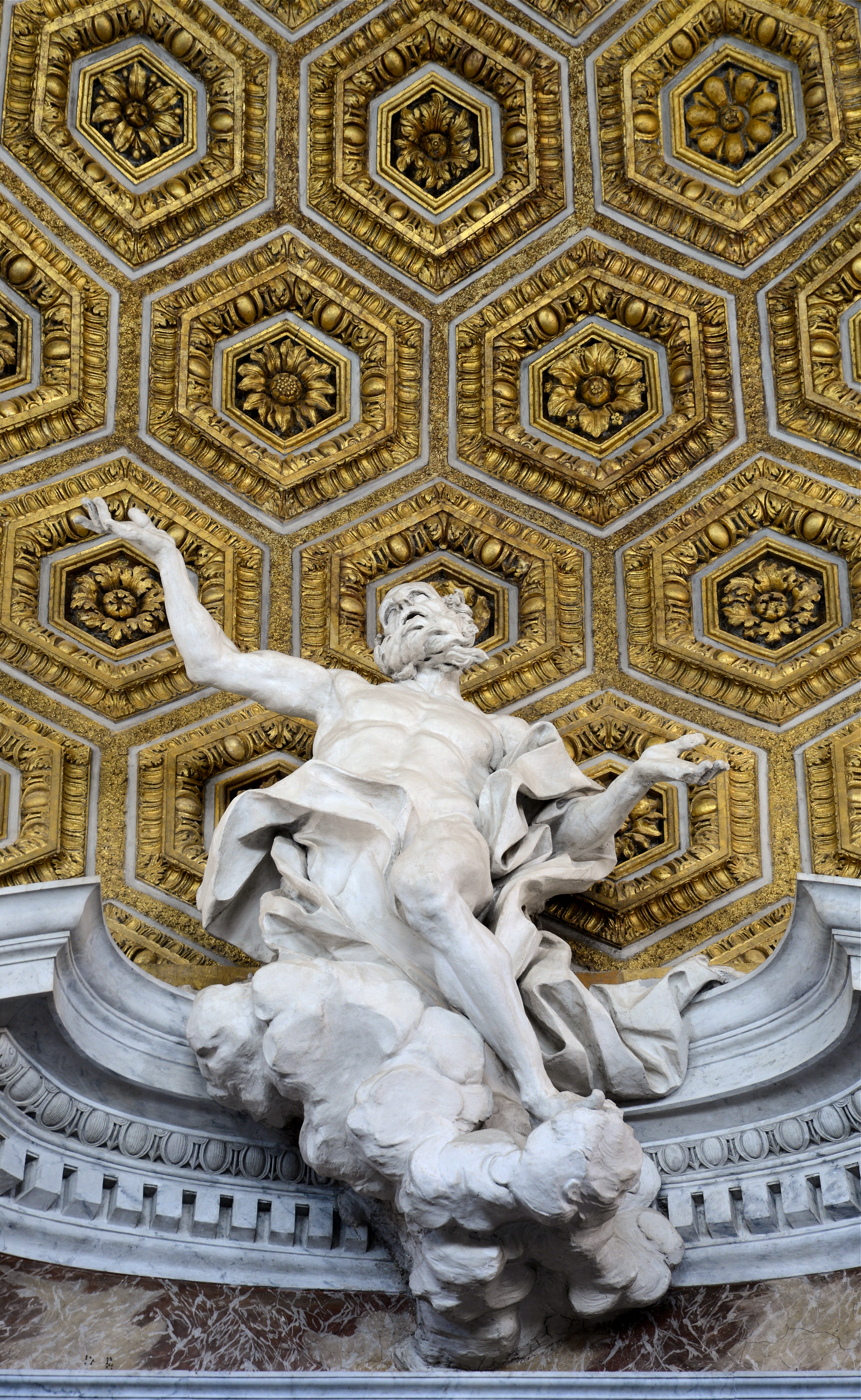
Saint Andrew ascending to the sky on a cloud, by Antonio Raggi

First chapel on the right, the Chapel of St Francis Xavier houses three canvases by Baciccio depicting the baptism, preaching and Death of St Francis Xavier (1705). In the ceiling, Filippo Bracci painted The Glory of St Francis Xavier.

The Chapel of the Passion, also known as the Chapel of the Flagellation, has three canvases with scenes from the Passion of Jesus Christ by Giacinto Brandi: a Deposition, a Flagellation, and a Road to Calvary (1682).

To the left of the main altar, the Chapel of Saint Stanislaus Kostka houses the shrine of the saint, an urn of bronze and lapis lazuli made in 1716. The painting above the funerary monument Madonna with child and Saint Stanislaus Kostka is by Carlo Maratta (1687) and a ceiling fresco of Glory of the Saints by Giovanni Odazzi. The last chapel, dedicated to Saint Ignatius of Loyola, houses the paintings Madonna and child and Saints and Adoration of Kings and Shepherds by Ludovico Mazzanti, with a ceiling with Glory of the Angels by Giuseppe Bartolomeo Chiari.

Between the Chapel St Stanislaus Kostka and the main altar is a side chapel with a large crucifix. It houses the tomb of King Charles Emmanuel IV of Sardinia and Piedmont, who abdicated in 1815 to enter the Society of Jesus and then lived in the Jesuit novitiate, adjacent to the church, until his death in 1819.

=== Burials ===
- Charles Emmanuel IV of Sardinia and Piedmont
- Shrine of St Stanislaus Kostka
- Emmanuel Théodose de La Tour d'Auvergne, known as Cardinal de Bouillon

== Rooms of St Stanislaus Kostka in the Jesuit novitiate ==
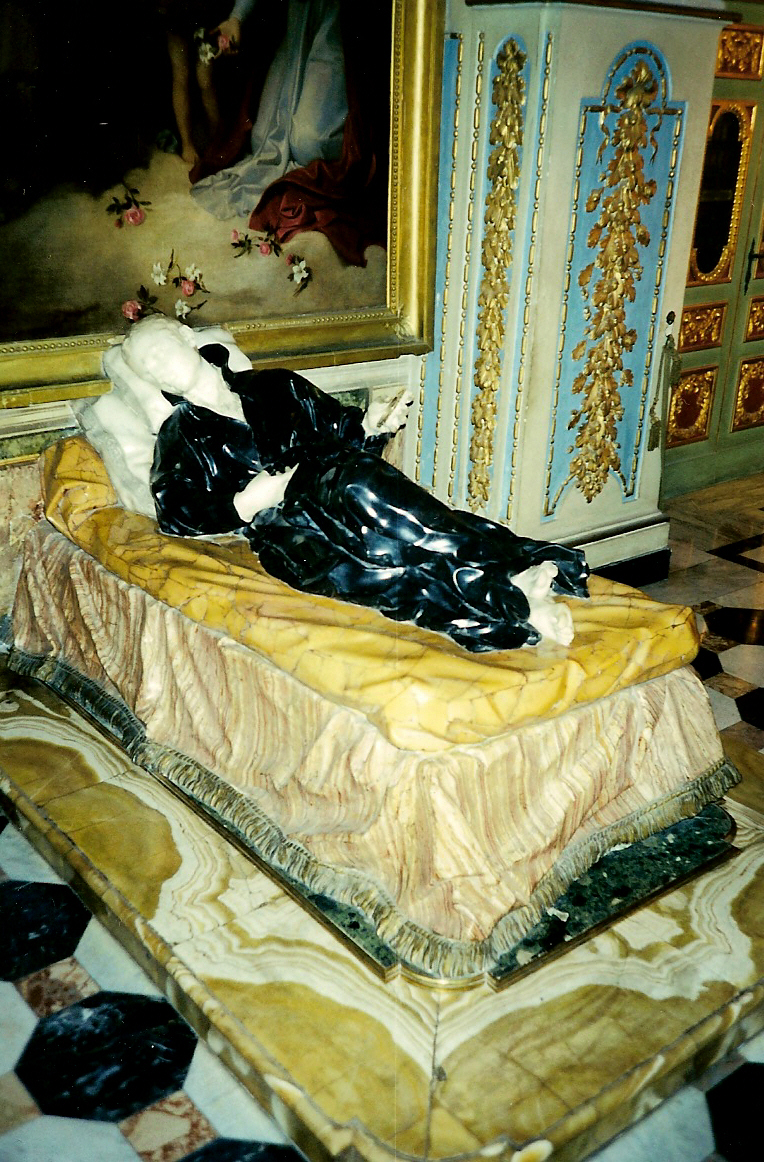
Sculpture by Pierre Legros of Saint Stanislaus Kostka (1702–03) in the Jesuit novitiate adjacent to Sant'Andrea al Quirinale, Rome.

The rooms of Saint Stanislaus Kostka have been reconstructed next to the church. A sculpture in polychrome marble by Pierre Legros (1702–03), depicts the dying saint. Fr. Andrea Pozzo has painted scenes from the life of the saint in the rooms. The canvas painting above the head of Legros' Stanislaus was painted by Tommaso Minardi in 1825 and covers some older, deteriorated frescos.

== List of Cardinal Priests ==
- Adam Kozłowiecki (21 February 1998 – 28 September 2007)
- Odilo Scherer (24 November 2007 – Present)

== See also ==
- List of works by Gian Lorenzo Bernini
- Sant'Andrea delle Fratte and Sant'Andrea della Valle, two other major Sant'Andrea churches in Rome
- 17th-century Western domes
- List of Jesuit sites
