= Laurindo Guizzardi =

Brazilian priest (1934–2021)

Laurindo Guizzardi C.S.
- Bishop of Foz do Iguaçu
- Church: Catholic Church
- Diocese: Diocese of Foz do Iguaçu
- In office: 28 November 2001 – 20 October 2010
- Predecessor: Olívio Aurélio Fazza
- Successor: Dirceu Vegini
- Previous posts: Bishop of Bagé (1982-2001); Coadjutor Bishop of Bagé (1982)

Orders
- Ordination: 20 December 1959
- Consecration: 18 April 1982 by João Cláudio Colling

Personal details
- Born: 7 July 1934 Nova Bassano, São Pedro do Rio Grande do Sul, Republic of the United States of Brazil
- Died: 22 February 2021 (aged 86) Foz do Iguaçu, Paraná, Brazil

Laurindo Guizzardi C.S. (7 July 1934 – 22 February 2021) was a Brazilian Roman Catholic prelate.

Guizzardi was born in Nova Bassano, Rio Grande do Sul, and was ordained to the priesthood in 1959. He served as bishop of the Roman Catholic Diocese of Bagé from 1982 to 2001 and as bishop of the Roman Catholic Diocese of Foz do Iguaçu from 2001 to 2010.
