= Odilo Scherer =

Brazilian Roman Catholic cardinal (born 1949)

His Eminence Odilo Pedro Scherer
- Cardinal, Archbishop of São Paulo
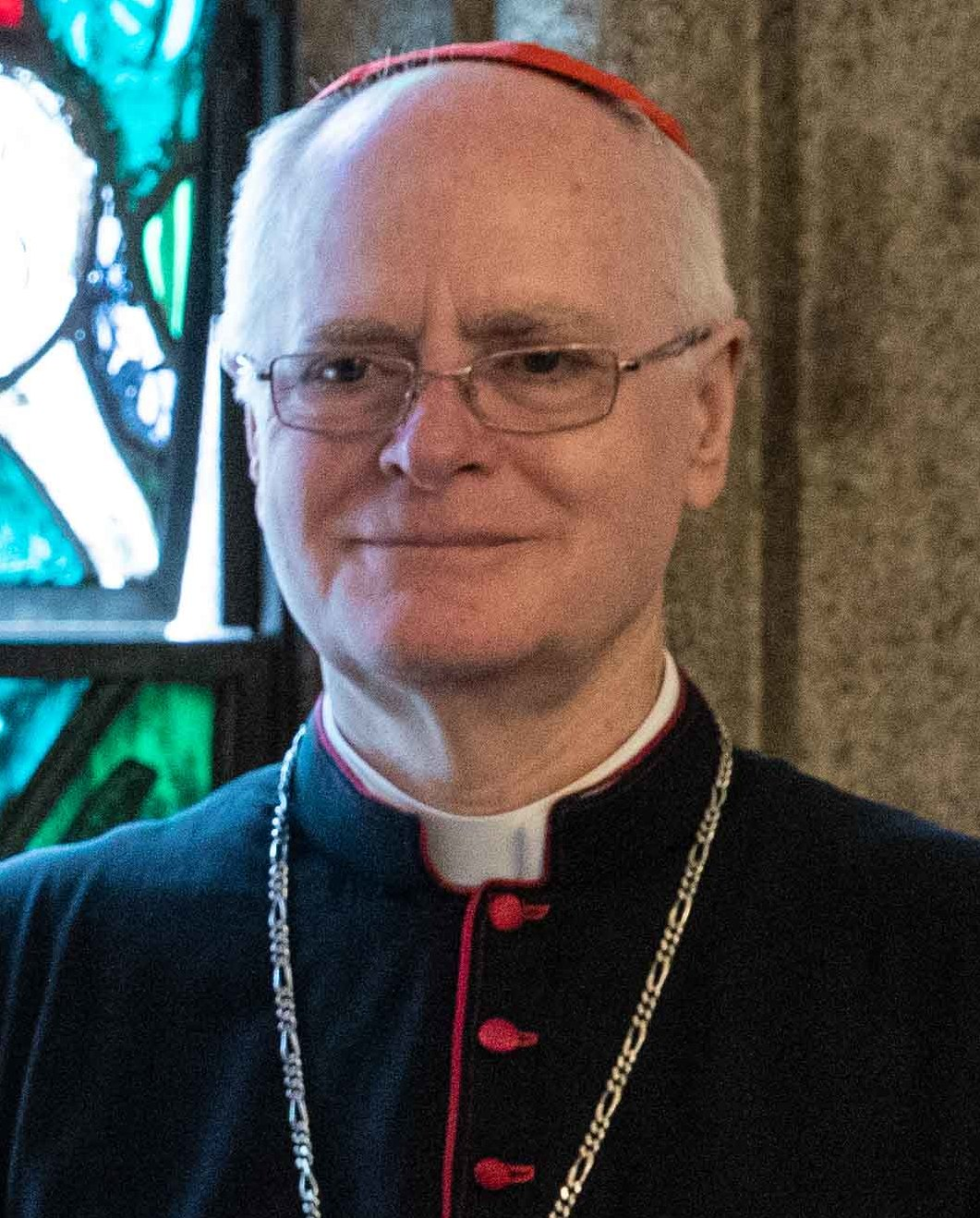
- Scherer on 16 September 2018
- Church: Roman Catholic Church
- Archdiocese: São Paulo
- See: São Paulo
- Appointed: 21 March 2007
- Installed: 29 April 2007
- Predecessor: Cláudio Hummes
- Other post: Cardinal-Priest of Sant’Andrea al Quirinale (2007–)
- Previous posts: Auxiliary Bishop of São Paulo (2001–07); Titular Bishop of Novi (2001–07); Secretary General of the Brazilian Episcopal Conference (2003–07)

Orders
- Ordination: 7 December 1976 by Armando Círio
- Consecration: 2 February 2002 by Cláudio Hummes
- Created cardinal: 24 November 2007 by Pope Benedict XVI
- Rank: Cardinal-Priest

Personal details
- Born: Otto Pedro Scherer; 21 September 1949 (age 76) Cerro Largo, Rio Grande do Sul, Brazil
- Denomination: Roman Catholic
- Motto: In meam commemorationem ("In memory of me")
- Coat of arms

Styles of Odilo Scherer
- Reference style: His Eminence
- Spoken style: Your Eminence
- Informal style: Cardinal
- See: São Paulo

Odilo Pedro Scherer (Portuguese pronunciation: [oˈdʒilu ˈpedɾu ˈʃɛɾeʁ]; born Otto Pedro Scherer; 21 September 1949) is a Brazilian cardinal of the Catholic Church. Since 2007 he has been the Archbishop of São Paulo, where he was auxiliary bishop from 2001 to 2007. From 1994 to 2001 he worked in the Roman Curia at the Congregation for Bishops.

Pope Benedict XVI made him a cardinal in 2007. Scherer was mentioned in the international media as a possible contender to succeed Benedict in 2013. When, in 2024, Scherer submitted his resignation as required at the age of 75, Pope Francis asked him to serve for two more years.

He has been described as "an intellectual with great command of finance and economics" and "on the bookish side". His theology and pastoral approach has been called "considered to be theologically moderate, though in his own country he is seen as fairly conservative". In style he is reserved. He eschews the politics and language of liberation theology, but preaches and practices an evangelism devoted to the suffering of the poor and open to lay participation and charismatic movements.

== Biography ==
=== Early life ===
Scherer was born on 21 September 1949 in Cerro Largo, Rio Grande do Sul, Brazil. He was the seventh of eleven children born to Edwino and Francisca (née Steffens) Scherer, part of the German Brazilian community. His paternal great-grandfather Mathias emigrated from Theley, Saarland, in the early 1880s. Originally named "Otto", he adopted the name "Odilo" in his youth, preferring "its softer pronunciation". (Note: Scherer has visited the German town from which his ancestors emigrated several times, as recently as 2003, and he speaks the local dialect of German.) His paternal uncle Alfredo Scherer was Archbishop of Porto Alegre from 1947 to 1981 and a cardinal from 1969 to 1996.

After preparatory studies at the minor seminary of São José in Curitiba (Paraná) from 1963 to 1969, Scherer studied philosophy at Queen of the Apostles Major Seminary in Curitiba and at the Faculty of Education of the University of Passo Fundo (Rio Grande do Sul) from 1970 to 1975. He also studied philosophy at the Studium Theologicum, part of the Pontifical Catholic University of Paraná in Curitiba. On 7 December 1976 he was ordained a priest for the Diocese of Toledo by Bishop Armando Círio.

He served as rector and professor at the diocesan seminary of Cascavel (Paraná) in 1977/78; rector and professor at the diocesan seminary of Toledo from 1979 to 1982 (and again in 1993); professor of philosophy at the Arnaldo Busatto School of Human Sciences in Toledo from 1980 to 1985. He worked as parochial vicar and parish priest of the Cathedral Parish of Cristo Rei in Toledo from 1985 to 1988. In the mid-1980s, Scherer also worked as a parish priest while on holiday in Bad Vilbel, Hesse, in Germany. He then taught philosophy at the Universidade Estadual do Oeste do Paraná from 1985 to 1994 and theology at the Paulo VI Theological Institute in Londrina in 1985. He earned his doctorate in theology from the Pontifical Gregorian University in Rome between 1988 and 1991. Returning to Brazil, he was rector of the Theological Seminary in Cascavel in 1991/92 and director and professor of the Interdiocesan Center of Theology of Cascavel from 1991 to 1993. He was rector of the Maria Mãe da Igreja Seminary in Serra in 1993. He then earned a master's degree in philosophy from the Pontifical Gregorian University in 1994/96.

For the Episcopal Conference of Brazil (CNBB) he was a member of the National Clergy Commission from 1985 to 1988 and a member of its Theological Commission for the South II Region in 1992/93.

In January 1994, he joined the staff of the Congregation for Bishops, leaving only when he was named a bishop in November 2001. Alongside his Curial service, he provided pastoral service at the parish of Saints Francis and Catherine, Patrons of Italy and was chaplain of the nursing home of the Franciscan Handmaids of the Good Shepherd.

=== Bishop and archbishop ===
On 28 November 2001, Pope John Paul II named Scherer and two others auxiliary bishops of São Paulo and he was appointed titular bishop of Novi. He received his episcopal consecration on 2 February 2002 from Cardinal Cláudio Hummes, with Archbishop Armando Círio and Bishop Anuar Battisti as co-consecrators. He was elected to a four-year term as secretary general of the CNBB in May 2003. On 12 December 2006, Pope Benedict appointed him adjunct general secretary of the Fifth Episcopal Conference of Latin America, scheduled for May 2007 in Aparecida. Alateia later said he proved impressive as secretary general of the CNBB for his "polished training, his calm demeanor, or his firm authoritativeness when needed".

Pope Benedict XVI named Scherer Archbishop of São Paulo on 21 March 2007. He was installed there on 29 April 2007, becoming ex officio the Grand-Chancellor of the Pontifical Catholic University of São Paulo (PUC-SP). His appointment was timed to allow for his installation before the pope's visit to Brazil in May. He was credited for his three areas of experience: in the Curia, the National Conference of Brazilian Bushops, and São Paulo. He was described as a "moderate" like his predecessor Cardinal Hummes. Asked at a 27 April news conference to assess the tension between the Vatican and the Latin American liberation theology movement that had long been contentious, he praised the movement for making the Church focus on poverty and social justice, while faulting its occasional reliance on Marxist analysis. About this time he also criticized the excesses of the charismatic movement as exemplified by Marcelo Rossi, a popular priest. Scherer said that "Priests aren't showmen.... The Mass is not to be transformed into a show." In early May he lost the election for president of the CNBB, as the bishops chose to demonstrate their independence from the Vatican rather than endorse Benedict's choice for their largest diocese. He then served from 2007 to 2011 as a member of the CNBB's commission for doctrine, and since 2007 has served continuously as a member of the CNBB's permanent council.

Scherer greeted Pope Benedict upon his arrival and accompanied him on much of his visit to Brazil from 9 to 13 May 2007, which was limited to the Archdiocese of São Paulo.

=== Cardinal ===
On 17 October 2007, Pope Benedict announced that he would make Scherer a cardinal. Scherer was elevated to the College of Cardinals in the consistory held on 24 November 2007. He was assigned to the order of cardinal-priests with the title of Sant'Andrea al Quirinale. On 12 June 2008, Benedict named him a member of the Congregation for the Clergy. (Note: This membership was confirmed in 2014.)

Pope Benedict XVI appointed him to the newly formed Cardinals Commission on the Vatican Bank in 2008 and renewed his membership on 16 February 2013 after announcing he planned to resign the papacy at the end of the month. His service ended when Francis replaced four of the five members on the commission in January 2014 after less than a year as pope.

On 24 June 2008 he was named as one of pope's appointees to the October 2008 meeting of the Synod of Bishops. He was elected to the secretariat of the Synod of Bishops. He participated in the October 2014 synod as a member of its general council. He joined in the October 2015 synod as one of the elected representatives of Brazil's bishops.

He was named to the presidential council of the Pontifical Council for the Family on 31 January 2009. He was appointed to the Pontifical Commission for Latin America on 8 October 2009. (Note: Pope Francis confirmed that assignment in 2014.)

Scherer has periodically objected to legal developments with respect to abortion in Brazil. In September 2008, he warned of the dangers of granting exceptions to the principle of the preservation of life as the Brazil Supreme Court considered allowing abortion in cases of anencephaly.

He has opposed attempts to enforce more restrictive concepts of the separation of church and state, arguing that traditional expressions do not represents attempts to establish or privilege one religion and have little impact on non-believers. In 2009, Scherer argued that removing crucifixes in public places would not be in the best interests of Brazilian secularism. In 2012 he objected to the removal of a phrase acknowledging the existence of a Supreme Being on Brazilian currency.

When Pope Benedict established the Pontifical Council for Promoting the New Evangelization in June 2010, Scherer explained it was meant to address a global "evangelization deficit" and underscore the Church's mission. On 5 January 2011, he was appointed among the first members of the newly created Pontifical Council for the Promotion of the New Evangelisation. (Note: His membership was renewed in April 2023.)

He was president of one of the CNBB's regions, the State of São Paulo, from 2011 to 2015.

In 2013 he served as one of the 115 cardinals in the conclave that elected Pope Francis. Scherer was mentioned in the international media as a possible contender to succeed Benedict, and he received some votes. The Catholic Herald called him "perhaps the most prominent Latin American candidate". Scherer spoke at the meetings preceding the conclave in defense of the curial officials whom other cardinals had criticized. One study of the 2013 election concluded that this "doomed" any chance he had of being elected.

On 30 November 2013, Pope Francis named him a member of the Congregation for Catholic Education. (Note: His membership was renewed in the restructured Dicastery for Culture and Education in 2023.)

In 2016, during the health crisis caused by the Zika virus, Scherer spoke frankly about the use of contraception. Where his colleague Bishop Leonardo Ulrich Steiner emphasized that Pope Francis' endorsement of contraception for disease prevention did not represent a change in the Church's prohibition against birth control, Scherer said: "Couples know very well how to prevent an undesired pregnancy", and added that the Church already gives "a lot of space to the personal decision" to prevent conception.

In the increasingly polarized political environment of 21st-century Brazil, he has had to contend with occasional political attacks. In October 2017, he rejected criticism of his support for distributing a controversial food supplement to the poor. He noted that the Church backed it since 2013, years before local politicians, so the mayor of São Paulo João Doria, who took office in 2017, was joining the work of the archdiocese rather than winning support from the Church. He described the Church's efforts in support of legislation to make it easier for grocers and restaurants to donate food and challenged his critics: "I feel offended when people compare this to animal food, as if we had contempt towards the poor. Contempt is to refuse food to the poor. Starvation is contempt. Contempt is when we politicize the hunger of the poor instead of helping the poor." In 2019, when opponents of the Synod of Bishops on the Amazon charged that an interfaith religious service celebrating the Synod constituted "left-wing activism", Scherer allowed that there had been a dispute between demonstrators but minimized it as "the beginning of a disturbance" and distanced the service from the actions of individuals. He said: "Everything happened in complete serenity.... The ones who assert it was a 'mess' and a 'profanity' are far from the truth."

Since May 2019 Scherer has been the representative of the CNBB to the Episcopal Conference of Latin America (CELAM) and in May 2019 he was also elected to a four-year term as vice president of CELAM. Pope Francis named him a member of the Council for the Economy on 6 August 2020.

In March 2020, at the start of the COVID-19 pandemic, Scherer initially kept churches open in his archdiocese, scheduling more frequent liturgical celebrations to reduce the size of the gatherings and recommending that the elderly and those at risk attend virtually. On 21 March, he suspended all celebrations with a congregation present. In May, as the number of sick continued to increase, he defended his decision even as Brazilian President Jair Bolsonaro minimized the health problem and was supported by evangelical pastors and some Protestant groups. Traditionalist Catholics argued for public Masses as well. Scherer's stance was supported by local government officials.

On 25 October 2023, Scherer was named to a four-year term as one of 21 members of CELAM's Center for Information and Research Management.

In November 2023, he suspended a priest who refused to retract statements calling Scherer and Pope Francis "heretics" and refusing to abide by restrictions on the use of the pre-Vatican II liturgy. On social media he put the liturgy issue in a broader context: "The problem is not simply the 'Tridentine Mass,' but the denial of the Second Vatican Council.... From denial of the Council we then go to denial of the Pope’s legitimacy. And from there, there is chaos in the Church. The rite of the Sacraments, including the Eucharist, is not a matter of subjective personal conscience. It is the responsibility of the Magisterium of the Church, which we can only accept and obey."

Scherer submitted his resignation as archbishop as required when he turned 75 in September 2024. Pope Francis declined it, asking him to remain for two more years.

Scherer was one of 133 cardinal electors who participated in the 2025 papal conclave, which elected Pope Leo XIV.

Scherer is the Grand Prior of the São Paulo Lieutenancy of the Equestrian Order of the Holy Sepulchre of Jerusalem.

== Writings ==
His principal works are:

- Justo sofredor: uma interpretação do caminho de Jesus e do discípulo, Ed. Loyola, 1995.
- Reflexões sobre Fé e Política, Edições CNBB, 2018.

== Notes ==
Catholic Church titles
Preceded by Ernesto Maria Fiore	— TITULAR — Titular Bishop of Novi; 28 November 2001 – 21 March 2007	Succeeded by Carmelo Cuttitta
Preceded by Raymundo Damasceno Assis	General Secretary of the Brazilian Episcopal Conference; 2003 – 2007	Succeeded by Dimas Lara Barbosa
Preceded by Cláudio Hummes	Archbishop of São Paulo; 21 March 2007 – present	Incumbent
Preceded by Adam Kozłowiecki	Cardinal-Priest of Sant'Andrea al Quirinale; 24 November 2007 – present	Incumbent
Preceded by Carlos María Collazzi Irazábal	First Vice-President of the Latin American Episcopal Council; 15 May 2019 – present	Incumbent
Order of precedence
Preceded by Geraldo Alckmin as Vice President of Brazil	Brazilian order of precedence 3rd in line as Brazilian cardinal	Followed by Foreign ambassadors
