= Christ the King Cathedral, Toledo =

Christ the King Cathedral
- Catedral Cristo Rei
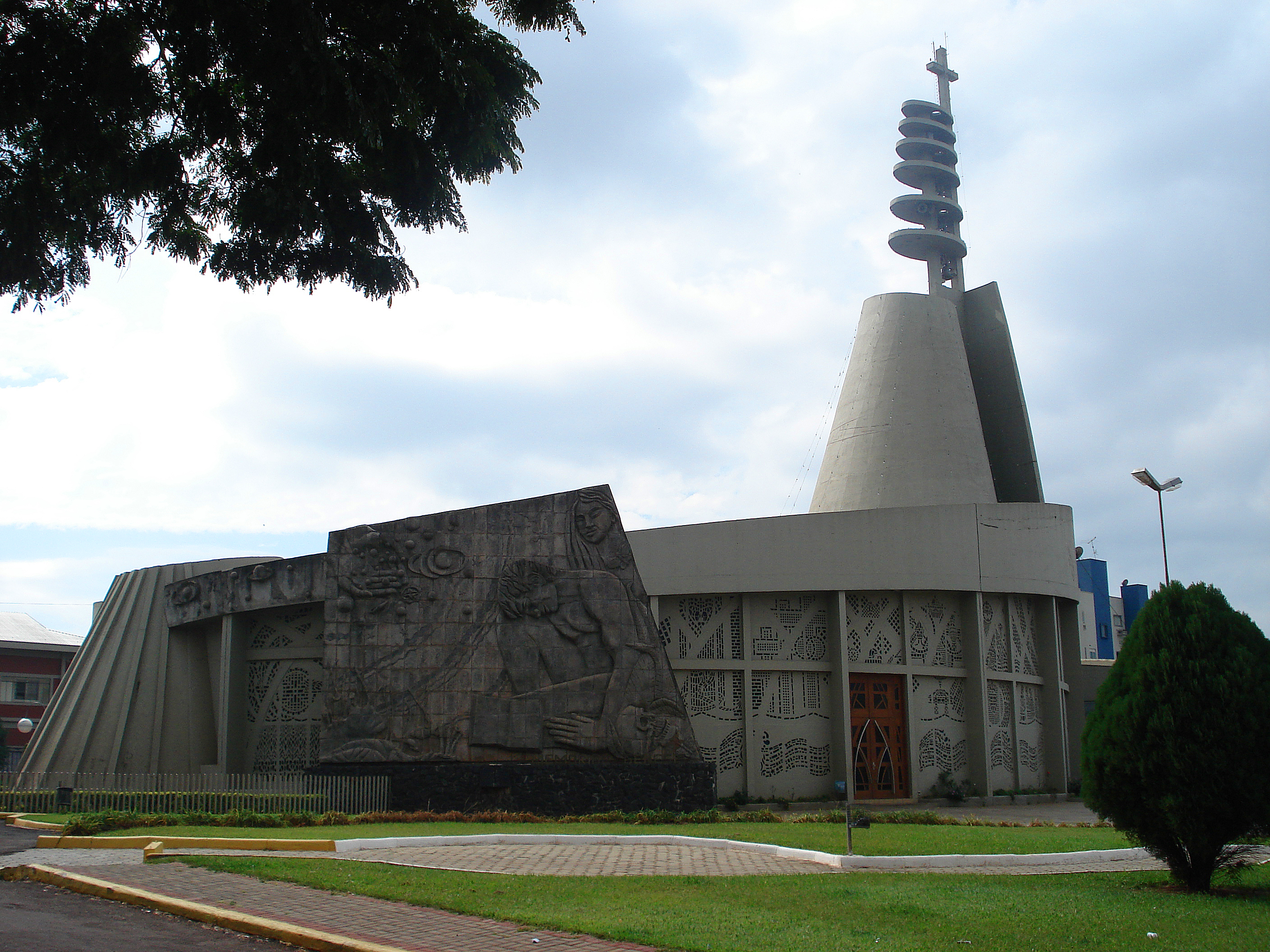
- Christ the King Cathedral
- Location: Toledo
- Country: Brazil
- Denomination: Roman Catholic Church

Administration
- Diocese: Roman Catholic Diocese of Toledo, Brazil

The Christ the King Cathedral (Portuguese: Catedral Cristo Rei) Also Toledo Cathedral It is a Catholic religious building located in the center of Toledo in the state of Paraná in the South American country of Brazil. It is the headquarters of the Diocese of Toledo in Brazil (Dioecesis Toletanus in Brasilia).

Constructed mainly of wood, the first church of Toledo was raised in the first years of the foundation of the city. In 1959 he was elevated to the status of a Diocesan Cathedral. In 1964 it was replaced by a new cathedral building, located in the heart of the city. The new structure was a mixture of brick and wood, but it had numerous structural problems that led to its demolition in 1976. Shortly after, the construction of the new and present cathedral of Toledo, designed by Emilio B. Zanon began. With a more modern design, the cathedral has become a monumental landmark for the city, and maintains traditional aspects such as bells and stained glass.

== See also ==
- Roman Catholicism in Brazil
- Christ the King
- List of cathedrals in Brazil
