= Dirceu Vegini =

Brazilian Roman Catholic bishop (1952–2018)

- Bishop of Foz do Iguaçu
- Church: Catholic Church
- Diocese: Diocese of Foz do Iguaçu
- In office: 20 October 2010 – 29 September 2018
- Predecessor: Laurindo Guizzardi
- Successor: Sérgio de Deus Borges
- Previous posts: Titular Bishop of Putia in Byzacena (2006-2010); Auxiliary Bishop of Curitiba (2006-2010)

Orders
- Ordination: 21 January 1984 by Domingos Gabriel Wisniewski
- Consecration: 2 June 2006 by Domingos Gabriel Wisniewski

Personal details
- Born: 14 April 1952 Massaranduba, Santa Catarina, United States of Brazil
- Died: 29 September 2018 (aged 66) Foz do Iguaçu, Paraná, Brazil

Dirceu Vegini (14 April 1952 – 29 September 2018) was a Brazilian Roman Catholic bishop.

Vegini was born in Brazil and was ordained to the priesthood in 1984. He served as titular bishop of Putia in Byzacena and was auxiliary bishop of the Roman Catholic Archdiocese of Curitiba, Brazil from 2006 to 2010. He then was bishop of the Roman Catholic Diocese of Foz do Iguaçu. Brazil, from 2010 until his death.
