= Diocese of Campo Mourão =

Catholic ecclesiastical territory

Coordinates: 24.0440°S 52.3772°W

Diocese of Campo Mourão Dioecesis Campi Moranensis

Catholic
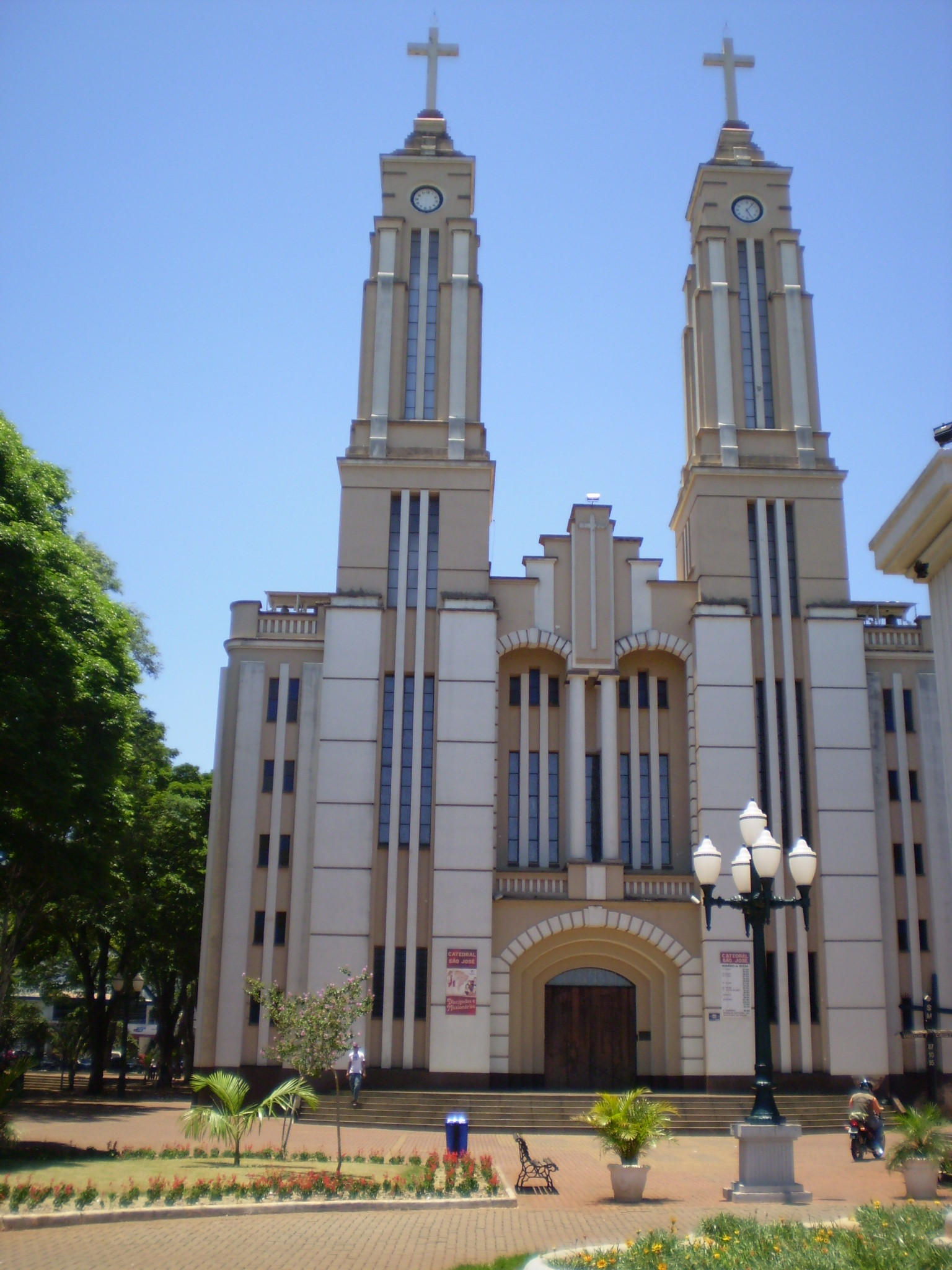
- Cathedral of St. Joseph

Location
- Country: Brazil
- Ecclesiastical province: Maringá

Statistics
- Area: 11,924 km^{2} (4,604 sq mi)
- Population: Total; Catholics: (as of 2023); 344,400; 342,000 (99.3%)
- Parishes: 41

Information
- Denomination: Catholic Church
- Sui iuris church: Latin Church
- Rite: Roman Rite
- Established: 20 June 1959; 67 years ago
- Cathedral: Catedral São José
- Secular priests: 67 (60 Diocesan, 7 Religious Orders)

Current leadership
- Pope: Leo XIV
- Bishop: Evandro Luis Braun
- Metropolitan Archbishop: Severino Clasen, O.F.M.
- Bishops emeritus: Francisco Javier Del Valle Paredes

Website
- www.diocesecampomourao.com.br

The Roman Catholic Diocese of Campo Mourão (Latin: Dioecesis Campi Moranensis) is a suffragan Latin diocese in the ecclesiastical province of the Metropolitan of Maringá in Paraná state, southern Brazil.

Its cathedral episcopal see is Catedral São José, dedicated to Saint Joseph, in the city of Campo Mourão.

== History ==
- Established on 20 June 1959 as Diocese of Campo Mourão, on territory split off from the suppressed Territorial Prelature of Foz do Iguaçu
- It lost territories three times: on 28 November 1964 to establish the Diocese of Apucarana, on 16 December 1965 to establish the Diocese of Guarapuava and on 26 May 1973 to establish the Diocese of Umuarama.

== Statistics ==
As of 2023, it pastorally served 342,000 Catholics (99.3% of 344,400 total) on 11,924km² in 41 parishes and a mission with 67 priests (60 diocesan, 7 religious), 21 deacons and 105 lay religious (31 brothers, 74 sisters).

== Bishops ==
(all Roman rite)

=== Episcopal ordinaries ===
Suffragan Bishops of Campo Mourão

- Elizeu Simões Mendes (17 October 1959 – 3 December 1980), resigned
- Virgílio de Pauli (8 May 1981 – 21 February 1999)
- Mauro Aparecido dos Santos (21 February 1999 – 31 October 2007), appointed Archbishop of Cascavel, Paraná
- Francisco Javier Del Valle Paredes (24 December 2008 – 6 December 2017), retired
- Bruno Eliseu Versari (6 December 2017 – 10 June 2024), appointed Bishop of Ponta Grossa, Paraná
- Evandro Luis Braun (9 April 2025 – Present)

=== Coadjutor bishops ===
- Mauro Aparecido dos Santos (1998-1999)
- Bruno Elizeu Versari (2017)

== See also ==
- List of Catholic dioceses in Brazil

== Sources and external links ==
- GCatholic.org, with Google map and satellite photo - data for all sections
- Catholic Hierarchy
- Diocese website (Portuguese)
