= Diocese of Bagé =

Catholic ecclesiastical territory

Coordinates: 31.3367°S 54.1043°W

Diocese of Bagé Dioecesis Bagensis

Catholic
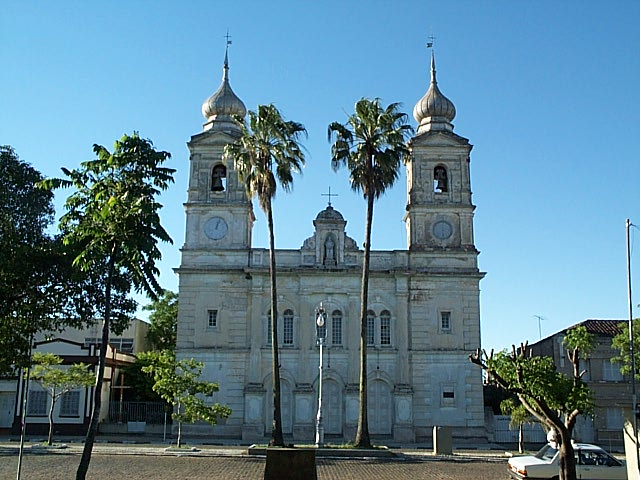
- Cathedral of Saint Sebastian

Location
- Country: Brazil
- Ecclesiastical province: Pelotas

Statistics
- Area: 35,554 km^{2} (13,727 sq mi)
- Population: Total; Catholics: (as of 2004); 390,092; 312,073 (80.0%)

Information
- Rite: Latin Rite
- Established: 25 June 1960 (66 years ago)
- Cathedral: Cathedral of Saint Sebastian

Current leadership
- Pope: Leo XIV
- Bishop: Cleonir Paulo Dalbosco, OFMCap
- Metropolitan Archbishop: Jacinto Bergmann
- Bishops emeritus: Gílio Felício

Website
- www.diocesebage.com

The Roman Catholic Diocese of Bagé (Latin: Dioecesis Bagensis) is a diocese located in the city of Bagé in the ecclesiastical province of Pelotas in Brazil.

== History ==
- 25 June 1960: Established as Diocese of Bagé from the Diocese of Pelotas and Diocese of Uruguaiana

== Bishops ==
- Bishops of Bagé (Latin Rite)
  - José Gomes (18 March 1961 – 16 July 1968), appointed Bishop of Chapecó, Santa Catarina
  - Angelo Félix Mugnol (15 January 1969 – 12 February 1982)
  - Laurindo Guizzardi, CS (12 February 1982 - 28 November 2001), appointed Bishop of Foz do Iguaçu, Parana
  - Gílio Felício (11 December 2002 – 6 June 2018)
  - Cleonir Paulo Dalbosco, OFMCap (26 September 2018 – present)

=== Coadjutor bishop ===
- Laurindo Guizzardi, CS (1982)

=== Other priest of this diocese who became bishop ===
- Roque Paloschi, appointed Bishop of Roraima, Roraima in 2005
