= Bagé =

Municipality of Rio Grande do Sul, Brazil

- Municipality
- Municipality of Bagé
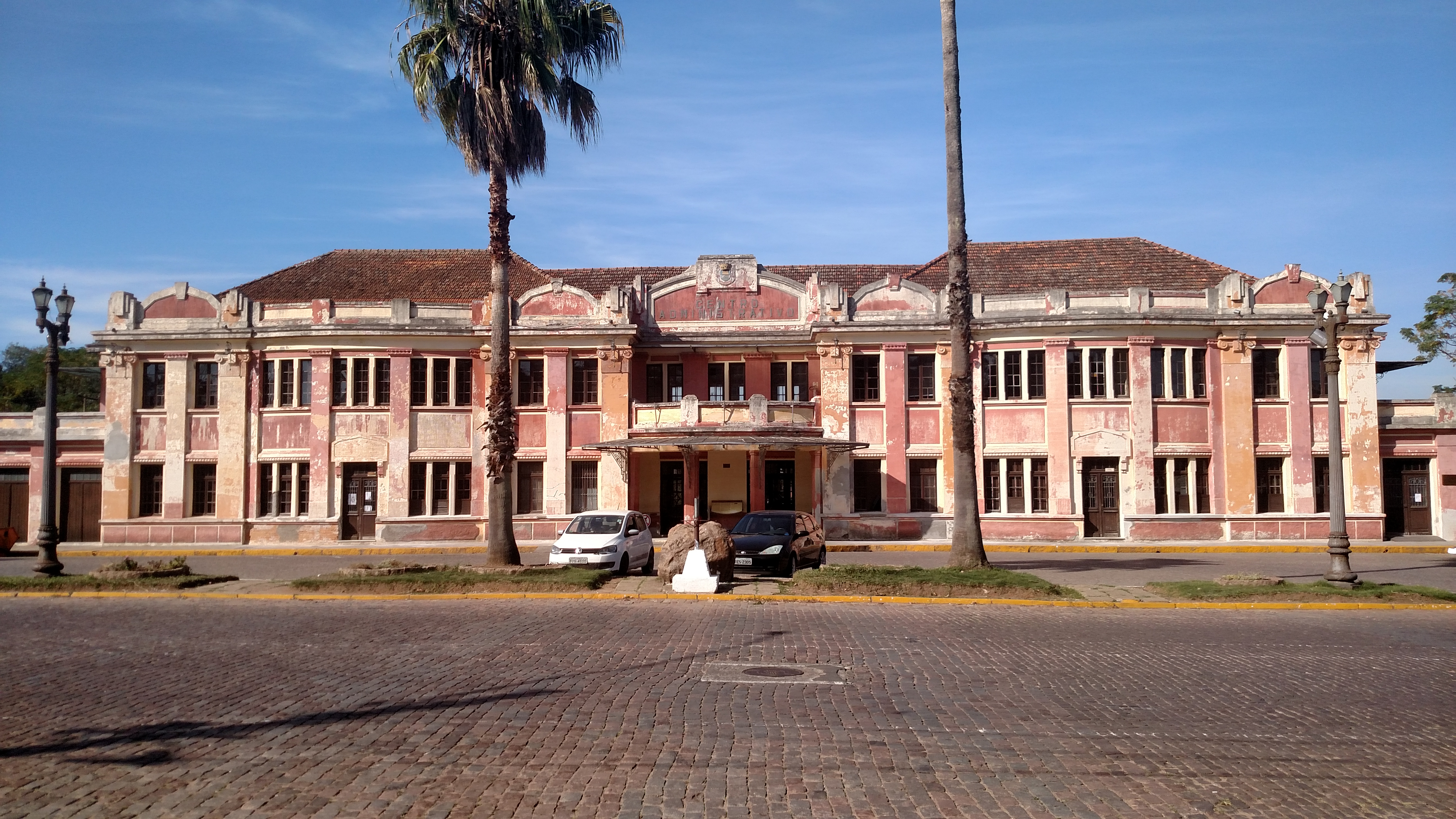
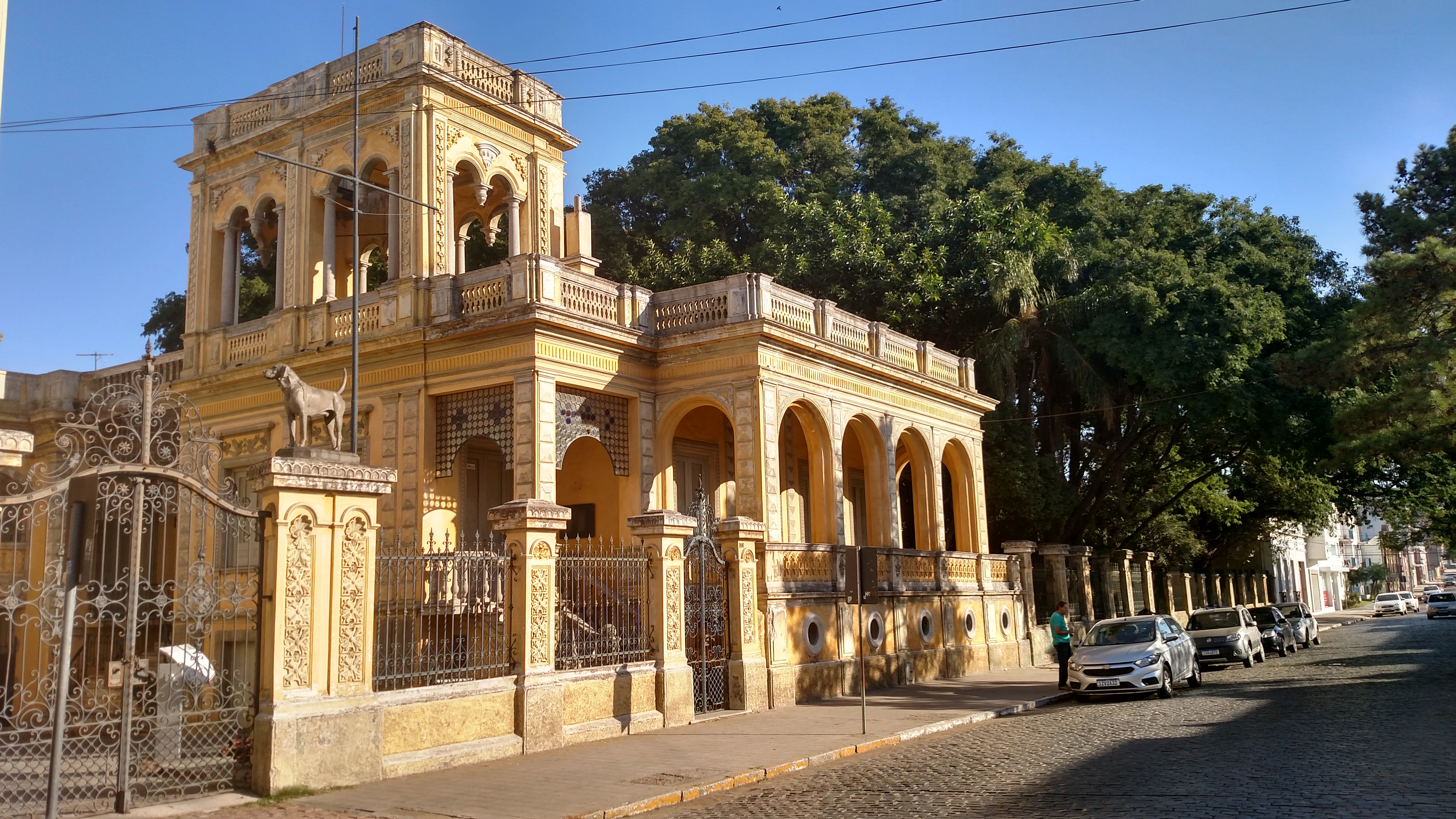
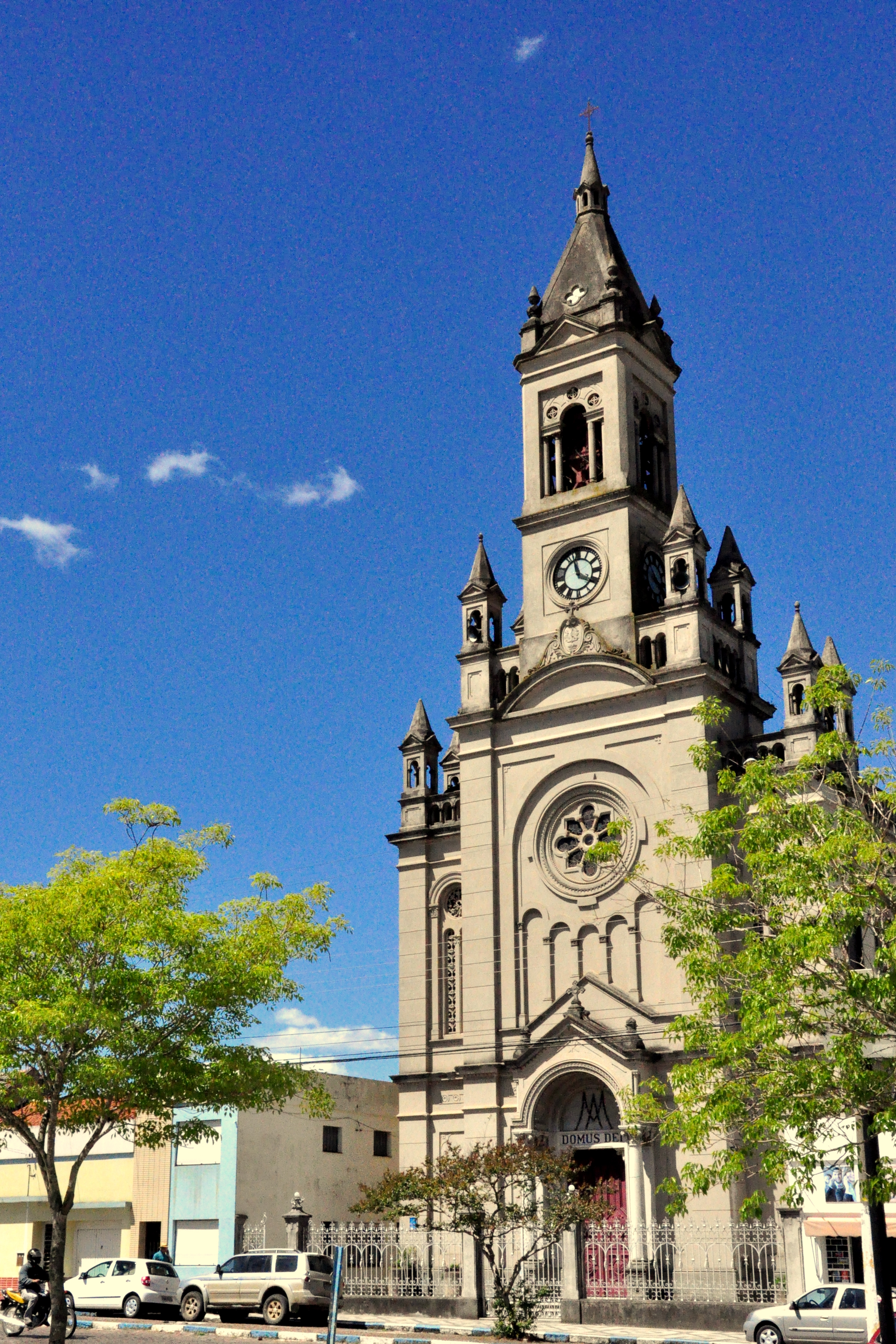
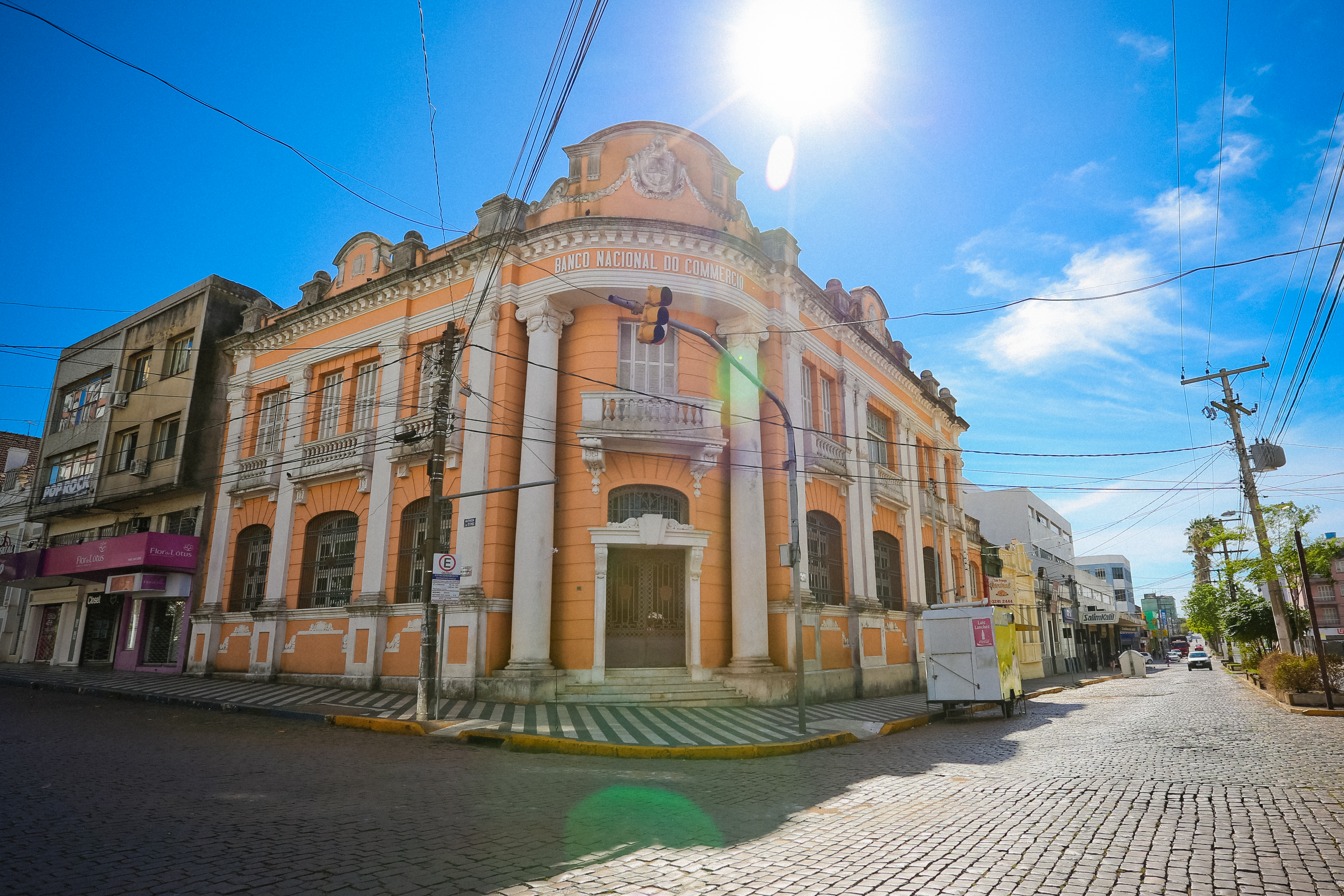
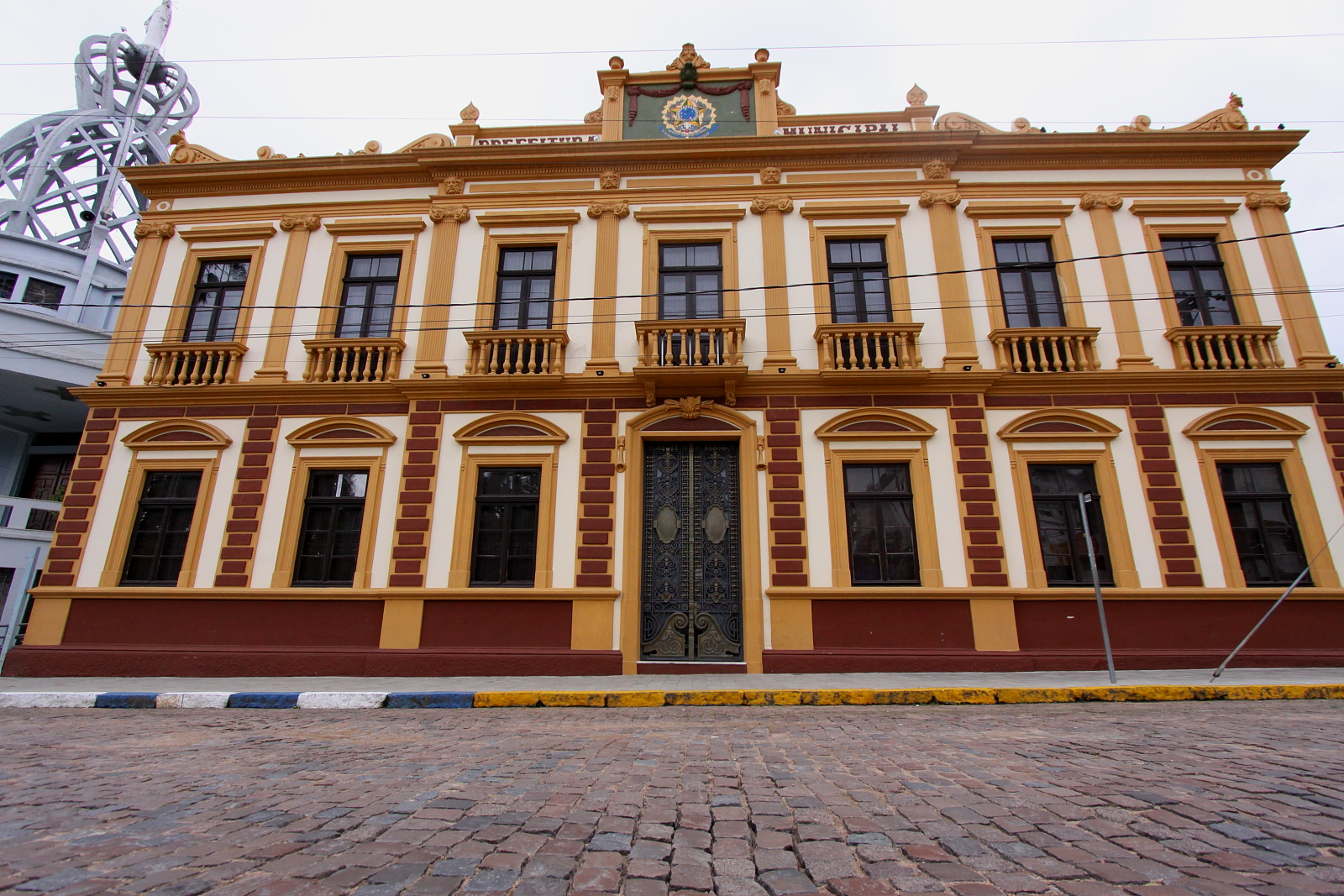
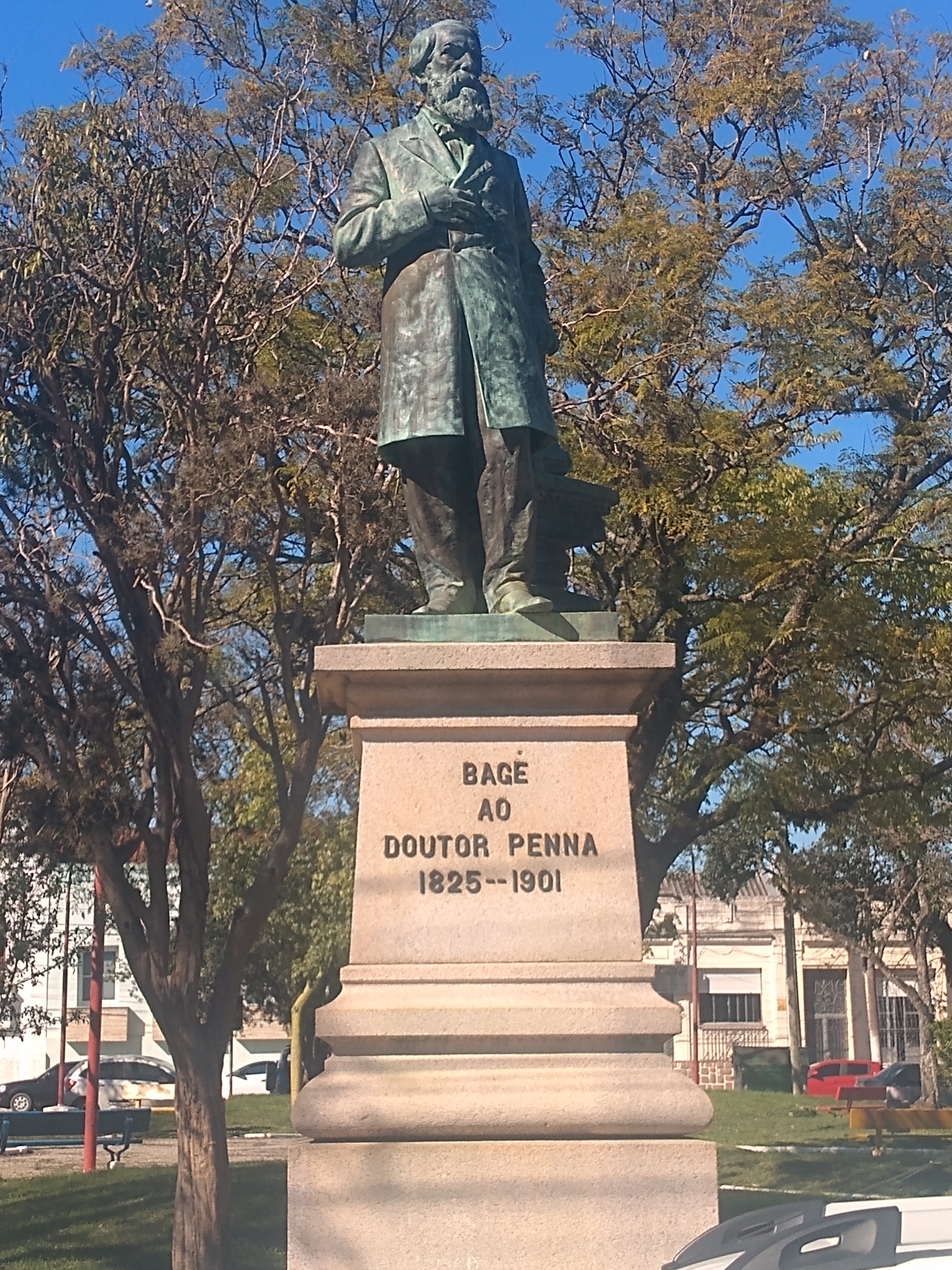
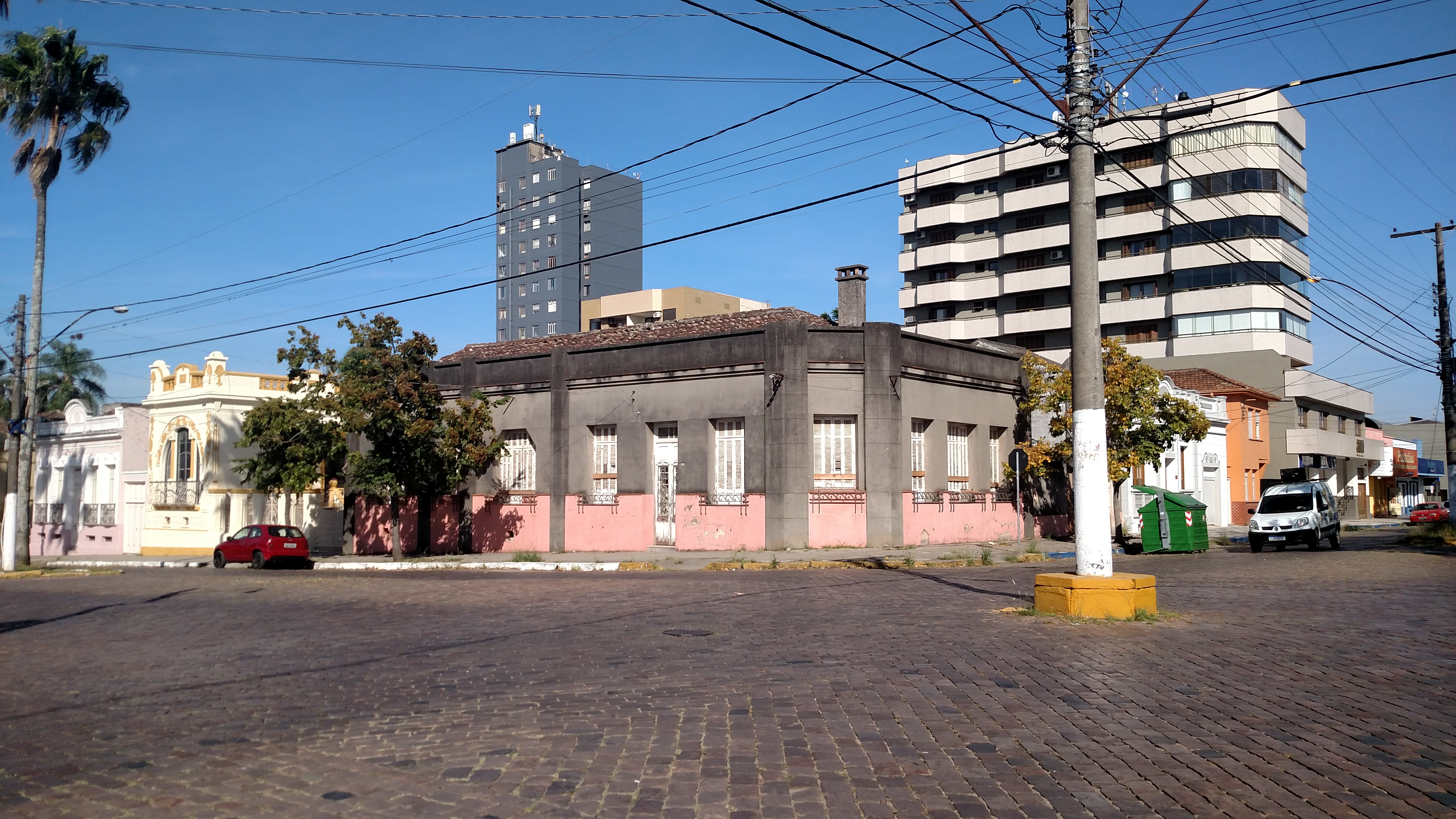

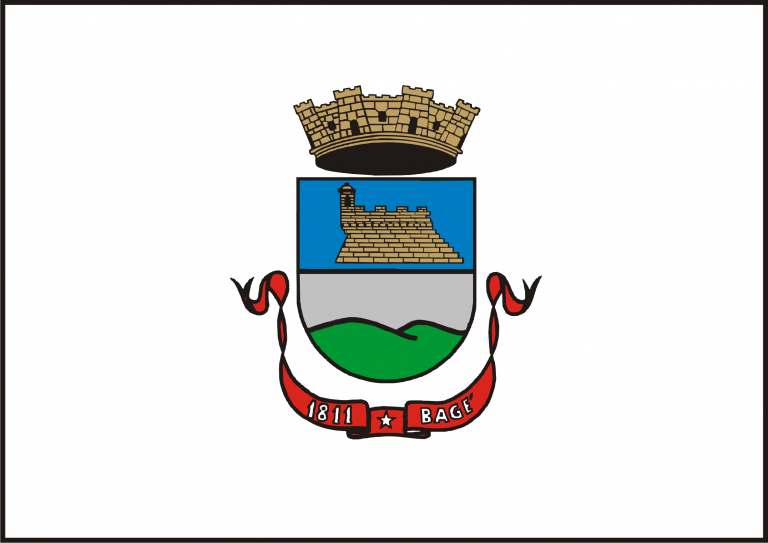
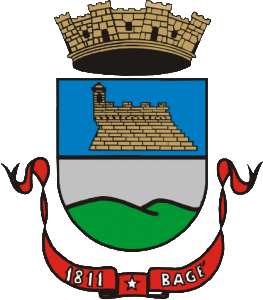
- Flag Coat of arms

- Location in Rio Grande do Sul

- Location in Brazil
- Coordinates: 31°19′51″S 54°06′25″W
- Country: Brazil
- Region: South
- State: Rio Grande do Sul
- Founded: 17 July 1811

Government
  - Mayor: Divaldo Lara (PTB, since 2021)

Area
  - Total: 4,090.36 km^{2} (1,579.30 sq mi)
- Elevation: 212 m (696 ft)

Population (2020)
  - Total: 121,335
  - Density: 29.6636/km^{2} (76.8285/sq mi)
- Demonym: bageense
- Time zone: UTC−3 (BRT)
  - Summer (DST): UTC-2
- Postal code: 96400
- Area code: +55 53
- HDI (2010): 0.740 – high
- Website: www.bage.rs.gov.br

Bagé (Portuguese pronunciation: [bɐˈʒɛ]) is a Brazilian municipality located in the state of Rio Grande do Sul. In 2020, its population was 121,335 in a total area of 4,096 km^{2}. It is the seventeenth largest city in the state according to the 2011 census. The city was founded in 1811 and given city status in 1859. Due to its strategic border location, Bagé has remained of significant military importance. Prior to official reorganization as a city, Bagé was seized by military forces from Uruguay and Argentina.

Primary industries located in the surrounding area are cattle and sheep ranching, as well as meat packing industries and wool depots. Recently, Bagé has become one of the largest wheat-producing areas in Rio Grande do Sul. Along with wheat, soybeans are also grown in the surrounding region.

== Etymology ==
There are several theories as to the origins of the name of Bagé. One states that there was an indigenous chieftain in the region called Ibajé, although the existence of this chifetain has never been proven. A more accepted theory is that the name comes from the indigenous language and is related to the idea of "hills". The local amerindians called the hills "mbaiê".

== History ==
Because of its location on the shortest route between Porto Alegre and Montevideo, Bagé has played an important role in the history of Brazil and the state of Rio Grande do Sul. Its lands have been sought after by Amerindians, the Portuguese and the Spanish. Important events of the Cisplatine and Ragamuffin Wars and also the Federalist Revolution happened in the city.

The first contact between the local Amerindians (Charruas) and the Spanish occurred in the second half of the seventeenth century when the Jesuits established a mission called Redução de Santo André dos Guenoas, in 1683.

In 1773, the governor of Buenos Aires, Juan José de Vértiz y Salcedo, left the region of the River Plate to expel the Portuguese from Rio Grande do Sul with 5,000 men. Upon arriving in the area he asked Bernardo Lecocq to build the Fort of Santa Tecla, of which there are still ruins. The fort was surrounded by a ditch 9 meters wide and 2.5 meters deep, with a 3-meter-high (9.8 ft) wall. This fort was sacked twice, the first time in 1776 when Rafael Pinto Bandeira invaded and expelled the Spanish. After signing the First Treaty of San Ildefonso in 1777 a Spanish garrison again occupied the fort now at the border between the two empires.

In 1801, the Spanish abandoned all their advanced posts, including Fort Santa Tecla, which was, for the second time, demolished. The territory was once again Portuguese.

In 1810, some of the Spanish colonies broke free from the motherland. In 1811 the governor of Rio Grande do Sul, Diogo de Sousa (later Count of Rio Pardo), concentrated a large force on the borderlands, fearing military action on the part of the newly formed neighboring republics. A camp was set up near "Cerros de Bagé", site where the city of Bagé is now located. On 17 July 1811 Sousa left with his troops to invade the Banda Oriental (present-day Uruguay) to conquer it and annex all the territory leaving the Uruguay River as a new border between Argentina and Brazil, some camp followers who could not keep up with the movement of the troops founded the present-day city. The date for the foundation of Bagé, 17 July 1811, was officially agreed on in 1963.

The settlement began to grow spreading out around the square called Praça da Matriz. In 1820 a simple church was built to house the image of the patron saint of the town, Saint Sebastian.

Even after the final demarcation of the border the lands of Bagé were the theater of wars and battles. In 1825 Carlos de Alvear invaded the territory from Uruguay and in 1827 the forces of general Juan Antonio Lavalleja conquered the town. In 1828 a treaty brought peace to the borderlands. Brazil accepted Uruguay's independence but in exchange kept some of the borderlands previously disputed for centuries between Spain and Portugal.

In 1835 it was the Gauchos who were fighting among each other. This new conflict was due to the ideals of republicans and monarchism. Bagé once again was witness to battles and pillaging. One of the most important, the Battle of Seival, took place between imperialist and republican forces led by Antônio de Souza Netto. The latter was victorious and he proclaimed the Riograndense Republic.

After this Farroupilha Revolution in 1846 Bagé was elevated to the category of "freguesia" and in the same year to "vila". In 1858 it was proclaimed head of the "comarca" and in 1859 it became a city.

Another revolution broke out in 1893 when the federalists reacted to the coming to power of the republicans. In this year Gumercindo Saraiva invaded Rio Grande do Sul and at Passo do Salsinho, the first combat took place. During this revolution the municipality was witness to the Battle of the Traíras, the Siege of Rio Negro, and the Siege of Bagé. At Rio Negro 300 prisoners had their throats cut. In the Siege of Bagé combats took place in the center of the town.

With the end of combats the beginning of the twentieth century seemed promising as Bagé had potential to become an industrial and agricultural center.

Narratives from this period show that the climate was benign and the soil rich in natural resources, with special mention of the coal mines of Candiota and Rio Negro. In the cattle raising sector Bagé was a large producer of sheep, cows and horses. Agriculture was less developed with the main crops being wheat and rice.

Bagé could count on considerable urban progress. The first railroad was inaugurated in 1884 with the finishing of the line to Rio Grande. Electrical lighting arrived in 1899, with Bagé being the first city in the state to have this important sign of progress. In 1913 a piped water system was installed.

Due to the importance of the city for the region it is called "Queen of the Border". It is the seat of the Universidade da Região da Campanha – URCAMP and is the seat of the Roman Catholic Diocese of Bagé.

== Economy ==
The economy is based on services, light industry and agriculture. Transformation industries employed 2,460 workers in 2006 while there were 1,199 agricultural establishments on 300,000 hectares employing 3,500 workers. There were 319,000 head of cattle and 103,000 head of sheep in 2007. The main crops were rice, corn, soybeans, sorghum, and wheat.

== Geography ==
=== Location ===
Bagé is located 374 km (232 mi) southwest of the state capital, Porto Alegre, and approximately 60 km (37 mi) north of the border with Uruguay at Aceguá. The distance to Pelotas to the east on BR-293 is 180 km (110 mi). Other distances from Bagé are:

- Santana do Livramento: 170 km (110 mi)
- Jaguarão: 196 km (122 mi)
- Santa Maria: 250 km (160 mi)

Comandante Gustavo Kraemer International Airport serves the city and the region although currently no scheduled flights operate to and from it.

=== Climate ===
At an elevation of 242 meters above sea level just south of latitude 30° Bagé has a mild climate with maximum temperatures of 30 °C in January and 17 °C in June and minimum temperatures of 18 °C in January and 8 °C in June. Rainfall is spread out throughout the year with a maximum of 140.9 mm in July and a minimum of 103.1 mm in April.

On 24 June 1918, Bagé registered a minimum temperature of −7.3 °C (19 °F), and on 13 January 2022, the city registered the highest temperature record, of 41.7 °C (107 °F). In winter, light snow flurries or sleet are quite rare, but can occur sometimes. Frosts are common and occur regularly during the winter.

Climate data for Bagé (1991–2020 normals, extremes 1931–1984 and 1988–present)
Month	Jan	Feb	Mar	Apr	May	Jun	Jul	Aug	Sep	Oct	Nov	Dec	Year
Record high °C (°F)	41.7 (107.1)	41.0 (105.8)	40.1 (104.2)	32.1 (89.8)	31.0 (87.8)	30.3 (86.5)	30.2 (86.4)	33.0 (91.4)	35.1 (95.2)	37.0 (98.6)	37.8 (100.0)	41.1 (106.0)	41.7 (107.1)
Mean daily maximum °C (°F)	29.7 (85.5)	28.9 (84.0)	27.5 (81.5)	24.1 (75.4)	20.0 (68.0)	17.7 (63.9)	17.2 (63.0)	19.5 (67.1)	20.6 (69.1)	23.3 (73.9)	26.3 (79.3)	28.8 (83.8)	23.6 (74.5)
Daily mean °C (°F)	23.8 (74.8)	23.1 (73.6)	21.5 (70.7)	18.3 (64.9)	14.7 (58.5)	12.6 (54.7)	11.8 (53.2)	13.6 (56.5)	15.0 (59.0)	17.7 (63.9)	20.3 (68.5)	22.7 (72.9)	17.9 (64.2)
Mean daily minimum °C (°F)	18.4 (65.1)	18.3 (64.9)	16.8 (62.2)	14.1 (57.4)	11.1 (52.0)	9.0 (48.2)	8.1 (46.6)	9.4 (48.9)	10.6 (51.1)	13.0 (55.4)	14.7 (58.5)	16.9 (62.4)	13.4 (56.1)
Record low °C (°F)	7.1 (44.8)	5.7 (42.3)	5.4 (41.7)	2.3 (36.1)	−1.2 (29.8)	−3.9 (25.0)	−5.9 (21.4)	−1.8 (28.8)	−1.1 (30.0)	0.6 (33.1)	3.0 (37.4)	4.5 (40.1)	−5.9 (21.4)
Average precipitation mm (inches)	137.3 (5.41)	129.1 (5.08)	113.9 (4.48)	173.2 (6.82)	129.6 (5.10)	122.9 (4.84)	130.5 (5.14)	112.6 (4.43)	135.6 (5.34)	176.0 (6.93)	116.9 (4.60)	122.3 (4.81)	1,599.9 (62.99)
Average precipitation days (≥ 1.0 mm)	8	8	7	7	8	8	8	8	8	9	6	7	92
Average relative humidity (%)	67.5	70.0	71.1	74.2	78.8	79.0	77.0	73.3	72.9	72.1	67.0	65.5	72.4
Mean monthly sunshine hours	247.0	215.7	223.4	177.4	156.2	132.1	151.7	154.0	161.6	194.8	234.3	250.5	2,298.7
Source 1: Instituto Nacional de Meteorologia
Source 2: Meteo Climat (record highs and lows - from 1931-1984 and 1988–present)

== Health and education ==
In 2005 there were 32 health establishments of which 3 were hospitals. These hospitals offered 251 beds. In the education sector there were 18,000 students in 71 primary schools, 5,896 students in 14 middle schools, 1,931 students in 77 pre-primary schools. In addition there were 3,595 students in one private college.

== Local attractions ==
Bagé has several local area attractions for visitors and locals. The Dom Diogo de Souza Museum in Bagé displays cultural and historical artifacts from the city and surrounding region. The museum opened in September, 1956. Some items displayed include historic currency, religious artifacts, historic documents, and a collection of nearly 100,000 photographs. The museum is frequented by more than 8,000 visitors annually.

The historic center of Santa Thereza was founded around the turn of the 19th century. This local attraction and village originally housed factory workers for Bagé. Santa Thereza is known for its symmetrical housing structures, clean alleyways, and terraced ground. Multiple cathedrals including Paróquia Nossa Senhora da Conceição and Catedral de São Sebastião are also recognized as attraction landmarks for visitors.

== Consular representation ==
Uruguay has a Consulate in Bagé.

== Notable people ==
- Marina Rodriguez (fighter), (MMA Fighter)
- André Luís Garcia
- Carlos Kluwe
- Sylvia Martins, painter
- Emílio Garrastazu Médici (President of Brazil)
- Cláudio Ibrahim Vaz Leal, better known as Branco (footballer)
- Dener Assunção Braz, (footballer)

== See also ==
- List of municipalities in Rio Grande do Sul
