= Archdiocese of Cascavel =

Catholic ecclesiastical territory

Coordinates: 24°57′49″S 53°27′24″W

Metropolitan Archdiocese of Cascavel Archidioecesis Metropolitae Cascavellensis Arquidiocese Metropolitano de Cascavel
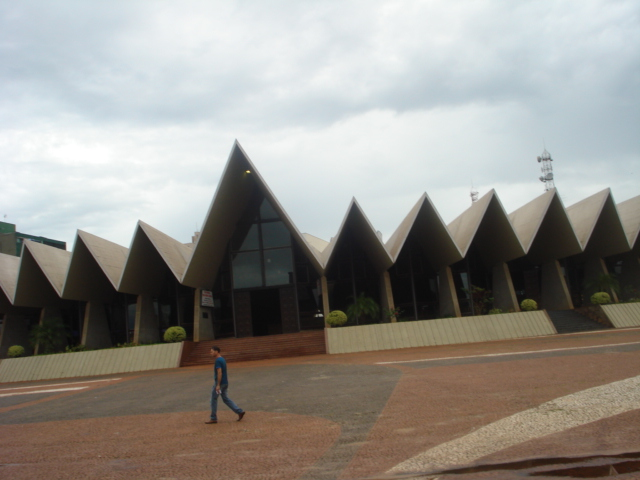
- Metropolitan Cathedral of Our Lady of Apparition

- Coat of arms

Location
- Country: Brazil

Statistics
- Area: 8,103 km^{2} (3,129 sq mi)
- Population: Total; Catholics: (as of 2006); 390,000; 292,000 (74.9%)

Information
- Denomination: Catholic Church
- Sui iuris church: Latin Church
- Rite: Roman Rite
- Established: 5 May 1978 (47 years ago)
- Cathedral: Our Lady of Apparition Cathedral in Cascavel

Current leadership
- Pope: Leo XIV
- Archbishop: Dom. José Mário Scalon Angonese
- Metropolitan Archbishop: Dom. José Mário Scalon Angonese
- Auxiliary Bishops: Aparecido Donizete de Souza
- Bishops emeritus: Dom. Adelar Baruffi

Website
- www.arquicascavel.org.br

The Archdiocese of Cascavel (Latin: Archidioecesis Cascavellensis) is a Latin Church archdiocese of the Catholic Church located in the city of Cascavel in Brazil.

== History ==
The Diocese of Cascavel was founded on May 5, 1978 from territory of the Diocese of Toledo. On October 16, 1979, Cascavel was promoted to the status of Metropolitan Archdiocese.

== Leadership ==
- Bishops of Cascavel
  - Armando Círio, O.S.I. (later Archbishop) (1978.05.05 – 1979.10.16)
- Archbishops of Cascavel
  - Armando Círio, O.S.I. (1979.10.16 – 1995.12.27)
  - Lúcio Ignácio Baumgaertner (1995.12.27 – 2007.10.31)
  - Mauro Aparecido dos Santos (2007.10.31 – 2021.03.11)
  - Adelar Baruffi (2021.09.22 – 2024.02.12)
  - Dom. José Mário Scalon Angonese (02.05.2024 - ...)
- Other priests of this diocese who became bishops
  - José Antônio Peruzzo, appointed Bishop of Palmas-Francisco Beltrão, Parana in 2005
  - Nélio Domingos Zortea, appointed Bishop of Jataí, Goias in 2015

== Suffragan dioceses ==
- Diocese of Foz do Iguaçu
- Diocese of Palmas–Francisco Beltrão
- Diocese of Toledo
