= José Mário Scalon Angonese =

Brazilian archbishop and prelate

His Excellency, The Most Reverend Monsignor José Mário Scalon Angonese
- Metropolitan Archbishop of Cascavel
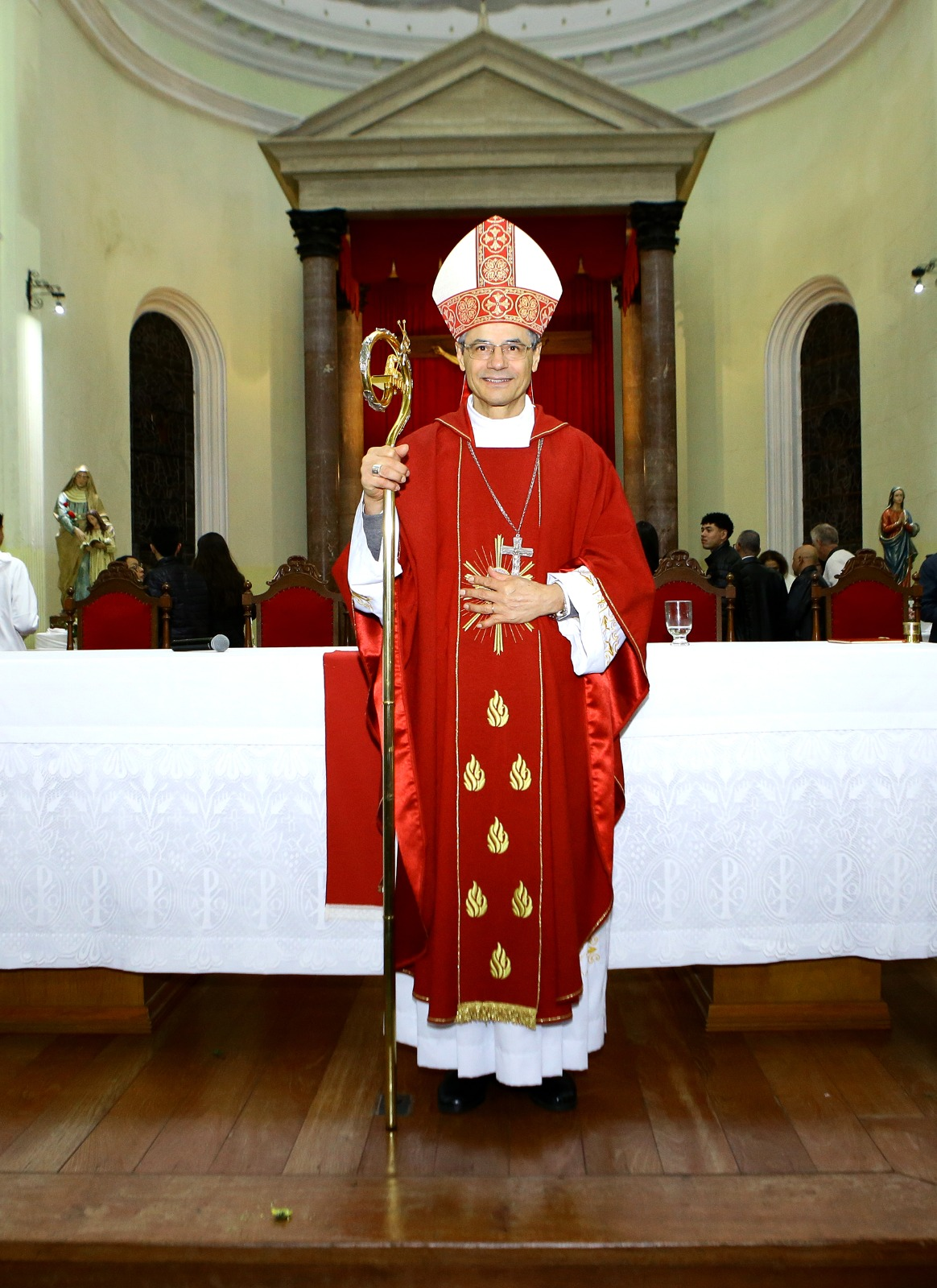
- Church: Roman Catholic Church
- Archdiocese: Cascavel
- Province: Cascavel
- Metropolis: Cascavel
- Appointed: 2 May 2024
- Predecessor: Dom. Adelar Baruffi
- Successor: Incumbent
- Previous posts: Auxiliary Bishop of Curitiba (2013-2017); Bishop of Uruguaiana (2017-2024)

Orders
- Ordination: December 1989
- Consecration: April 2013
- Rank: Metropolitan Archbishop

Personal details
- Born: José Mário Scalon Angonese; June 1, 1960 (age 66) Uruguaiana, Rio Grande do Sul, Brazil.
- Denomination: Catholic Church
- Occupation: Archbishop, Prelate
- Education: Salesian Pontifical University
- Motto: Ecce ego, mitte me

José Mário Scalon Angonese (born 1 June 1960) is a Brazilian prelate of the Catholic Church. He is the fifth Metropolitan Archbishop of the Roman Catholic Metropolitan Archdiocese of Cascavel, appointed by Pope Francis on 2 May 2024 to replace Dom. Adelar Baruffi. He served as Bishop of Uruguaiana from 2017 to 2024.

== Biography ==
Dom. José Mário Scalon Angonese born on 1 June 1960 in Uruguaiana, Rio Grande do Sul, Brazil, finished his studies the senior high school in Uruguaiana. He then studied in philosophy and theology at the Major Seminary in Porto Alegre. After his ordination as a priest of the Metropolitan Archdiocese of Santa Maria in 1989, he studied at the Salesian Pontifical University in Rome, Italy and he obtained the licentiate degree in Psychology and Pedagogy. Upon his return, he served as vocational promotor, spiritual director and the Rector of the Minor Seminary, Parish priest in Nova Palma and Santa Maria, and the Rector of the Major Seminary. After almost 24 years as a priest, on 20 February 2013, Pope Benedict XVI appointed him as auxiliary bishop of the Metropolitan Archdiocese of Curitiba. He was ordained bishop on 28 April 2013. On 31 May 2017, Pope Francis appointed him as bishop of Uruguaiana. On 2 May 2024, he was appointed metropolitan archbishop of the Metropolitan Archdiocese of Cascavel, after the resignation of Dom. Adelar Baruffi. His installation as metropolitan archbishop of Cascavel will be on 9 June 2024.
