= Diocese of Toledo, Brazil =

Catholic ecclesiastical territory

Coordinates: 24°42′50″S 53°44′34″W

Diocese of Toledo Dioecesis Toletanus in Brasilia Diocese de Toledo
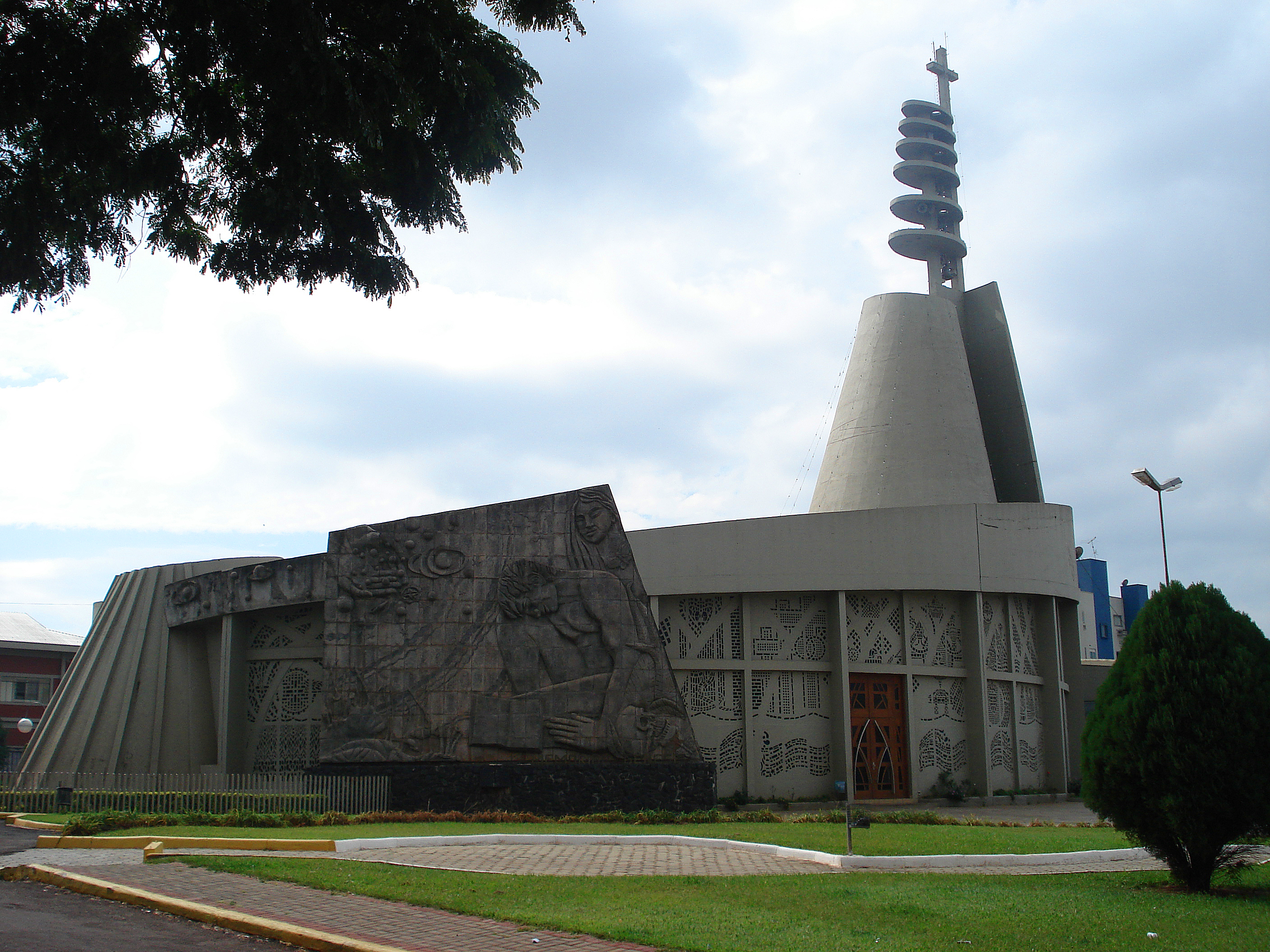
- Cathedral of Christ the King

Location
- Country: Brazil
- Ecclesiastical province: Cascavel
- Metropolitan: Cascavel

Statistics
- Area: 8,000 km^{2} (3,100 sq mi)
- Population: Total; Catholics: (as of 2010); 381,000; 337,000 (88.5%)

Information
- Rite: Roman Rite
- Established: 20 June 1959 (66 years ago)
- Cathedral: Cathedral of Christ the King in Toledo

Current leadership
- Pope: Leo XIV
- Bishop: João Carlos Seneme
- Metropolitan Archbishop: Adelar Baruffi

Website
- Website of the Diocese

The Roman Catholic Diocese of Toledo (Latin: Dioecesis Toletanus in Brasilia) is a diocese located in the city of Toledo in the ecclesiastical province of Cascavel in Brazil.

== History ==
- June 20, 1959: Established as Diocese of Toledo from the Territorial Prelature of Foz do Iguaçu

== Bishops ==
- Bishops of Toledo (Latin Church), in reverse chronological order
  - Bishop João Carlos Seneme (2013.06.26 – ...)
  - Bishop Francisco Carlos Bach (2005.07.27 – 2012.10.03), appointed Bishop of São José dos Pinhais, Parana
  - Bishop Anuar Battisti (1998.04.15 – 2004.09.29), appointed Archbishop of Maringá, Parana
  - Bishop Lúcio Ignácio Baumgaertner (1983.07.02 – 1995.12.27), appointed Archbishop of Cascavel
  - Bishop Geraldo Majella Agnelo (1978.05.05 – 1982.10.04), appointed Archbishop of Londrina, Parana; future Cardinal
  - Bishop Armando Círio, O.S.I. (1960.05.14 – 1978.05.05), appointed Bishop of Cascavel; future archbishop

=== Other priests of this diocese who became bishops ===
- Irineu Roque Scherer, appointed Bishop of Garanhuns, Pernambuco in 1998
- Odilo Pedro Scherer, appointed Auxiliary Bishop of São Paulo in 2001; future Cardinal
