= Armando Círio =

Brazilian bishop

The Most Reverend Armando Círio, OSJ
- Archbishop Emeritus of Cascavel
- Church: Roman Catholic Church
- See: Archdiocese of Cascavel
- In office: 1979–1995
- Predecessor: None
- Successor: Lúcio Ignácio Baumgaertner

Orders
- Ordination: June 29, 1940

Personal details
- Born: April 30, 1916 Calamandrana, Italy
- Died: August 11, 2014 (aged 98)

Armando Círio, O.S.I. (April 30, 1916 – August 11, 2014) was a Brazilian bishop of the Roman Catholic Church. At his death he was one of oldest bishops in the Catholic Church and the oldest Brazilian bishop.

Círio was born in Calamandrana, Italy, in April 1916 and was ordained a priest on June 29, 1940, in the religious order of Oblates of St. Joseph. He was appointed bishop of the Diocese of Toledo (Brazil) on May 14, 1960, and ordained bishop August 28, 1960. On October 15, 1979, Círio was appointed Archbishop of the Archdiocese of Cascavel and remained there until his retirement on December 27, 1995.
