= Michael Wiwchar =

Canadian-born bishop

The Most Reverend Michael Wiwchar CSsR
- Eparch-Emeritus of Saskatoon
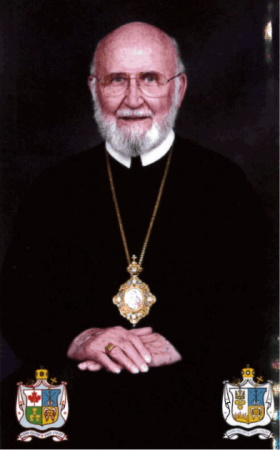
- Church: Ukrainian Greek Catholic Church
- Archdiocese: Ukrainian Catholic Archeparchy of Winnipeg
- Diocese: Ukrainian Catholic Eparchy of Saskatoon
- Appointed: December 9, 2000
- Term ended: May 2, 2008
- Predecessor: Cornelius Pasichny
- Successor: Bryan Bayda
- Previous post: Eparch of Saint Nicholas of Chicago (1993-2000)

Orders
- Ordination: June 28, 1959 by Maxim Hermaniuk
- Consecration: September 28, 1993 by Stephen Sulyk

Personal details
- Born: May 9, 1932 (age 94) Komarno, Manitoba, Canada
- Motto: "Один Пастир, Одне Стадo"
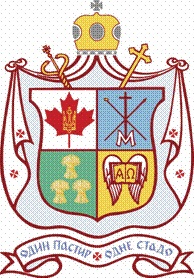
- Coat of arms

Styles of Michael Wiwchar
- Reference style: Excellency
- Spoken style: Your Excellency

Michael Wiwchar CSsR (born May 9, 1932) is a Canadian-born bishop of the Ukrainian Greek Catholic Church in the United States and Canada. He served as the third eparch (bishop) of the Ukrainian Catholic Eparchy of Saint Nicholas of Chicago from 1993 to 2000 and as the fourth eparch of the Ukrainian Catholic Eparchy of Saskatoon from 2000 to 2008.

== Early life and education ==
Michael Wiwchar was born in Komarno, Manitoba, Canada, to Wasyl and Anna (Chajkowska) Wiwchar. He was one of four children, three boys and a girl. He was educated at the Redemptorist minor seminary in Roblin, Manitoba. He entered the novitiate in Yorkton, Saskatchewan and professed temporary vows as a Redemptorist in 1953 and perpetual vows in 1956. He was ordained a priest on June 28, 1959 in Winnipeg, Manitoba.

== Priesthood ==
As a priest Wiwchar served in both educational and pastoral ministries. He was assigned to Saint Vladimir's College where he was a teacher, Socius, Prefect and Director, Vocation Director and Campaign Director. He was also involved in athletics, especially hockey. He served in pastoral assignments in Roblin, Swan River, Manitoba, Ethelbert, Manitoba, St. Joseph Parish in Winnipeg, Ss. Peter and Paul in Saskatoon, St. John the Baptist in Newark, New Jersey.

== Episcopacy ==
Pope John Paul II named Wiwchar as the eparch of St. Nicholas of Chicago on July 2, 1993. He was ordained a bishop by Archbishop Stephen Sulyk of Philadelphia. The principal co-consecrators were Archbishop Michael Bzdel and Bishop Innocent Lotocky, Emeritus Eparch of St. Nicholas of Chicago. On November 20, 2000 Wiwchar was appointed as the eparch of Saskatoon. A month later on December 9 he was appointed as the Apostolic Administrator of St. Nicholas of Chicago, a position he held until March 25, 2003. Wiwchar served in Saskatoon until his resignation was accepted by Pope Benedict XVI on May 2, 2008.

Catholic Church titles
Preceded by Innocent Lotocky	Eparch of Saint Nicholas of Chicago; 1993–2000	Succeeded by Richard Seminack
