= Michael Smolinski =

Canadian Greek Catholic bishop

His Excellency, The Most Reverend Michael Smolinski CSsR
- Eparchial Bishop of the Ukrainian Catholic Eparchy of Saskatoon
- Church: Ukrainian Greek Catholic Church
- Metropolis: Ukrainian Catholic Archeparchy of Winnipeg
- See: Ukrainian Catholic Eparchy of Saskatoon
- Appointed: November 30, 2023
- Installed: January 21, 2024
- Predecessor: Bryan Bayda
- Previous posts: Provincial Superior of the Province of Canada, Congregation of the Most Holy Redeemer (2023)

Orders
- Ordination: July 5, 2003 (Priest) by Michael Wiwchar
- Consecration: January 20, 2024 (Bishop) by Sviatoslav Shevchuk

Personal details
- Born: Michael Smolinski; September 10, 1972 (age 54) Saskatoon, Canada
- Denomination: Catholic Church
- Education: University of St. Michael's College (M.Div. '02); Metropolitan Andrey Sheptytsky Institute of Eastern Christian Studies (Post-Bac.Cert. E.C.S. '03)
- Alma mater: University of Saskatchewan (B.Ed. '94)
- Motto: Everything God has created is good (1 Tim. 4:4)

Bishop Michael Smolinski CSsR (Ukrainian: Михайло Смолінський; born September 10, 1972) is a Canadian Ukrainian Greek Catholic hierarch, who is serving as the sixth Eparchial Bishop of the Ukrainian Catholic Eparchy of Saskatoon since November 30, 2023.

== Early life and education ==
Bishop Michael Smolinski was born on September 10, 1972 in Saskatoon. After completed secondary education, he attended the University of Saskatchewan, where he was awarded a Bachelor of Education Degree (B.Ed.) and later joined the Congregation of the Most Holy Redeemer on September 1, 1997; he made simple profession on August 15, 1999 and solemn profession of vows on August 15, 2002, and was ordained as priest on July 5, 2003 at the Sts. Peter and Paul church in Saskatoon by Bishop Michael Wiwchar, after graduating from the University of St. Michael's College in Toronto with a Masters of Divinity Degree (M.Div.). He also attended courses on Eastern Christian studies at the Sheptytsky Institute of Saint Paul University in Ottawa.

== Pastoral career ==
Rev. Michael served in the following pastoral assignments: assistant pastor of the parish of St. Joseph in Winnipeg (2003–2005), Director of the Welcome Home in Winnipeg (2005–2015); extraordinary member of the Provincial Council of Redemptorists (2008–2023); pastor of Saints Peter and Paul Parish Saskatoon (2015—2019), and then assistant pastor of the same parish (2019–2022). On November 17, 2022 he was elected as the provincial superior of the Congregation of Redemptorists in Canada and took office at the Canadian Provincial Chapter on January 17, 2023.

== Bishop ==
On November 30, 2023 he was appointed by Pope Francis as the sixth Eparchial Bishop of the Ukrainian Catholic Eparchy of Saskatoon. He was consecrated as a bishop by major archbishop Sviatoslav Shevchuk and co-consecrators: archbishop Lawrence Huculak and bishop Bryan Bayda in Saints Peter and Paul Church in Saskatoon on January 20, 2024.

Catholic Church titles
Preceded by Bryan Bayda	Eparchial Bishop of Ukrainian Catholic Eparchy of Saskatoon; 2024–	Succeeded by Incumbent
