= Myron Daciuk =

Canadian Ukrainian Catholic hierarch

Myron Daciuk, O.S.B.M.
- Eparchial Bishop of Ukrainian Catholic Eparchy of Edmonton
- Church: Ukrainian Greek Catholic Church
- Appointed: 28 October 1991
- Term ended: 14 January 1996
- Predecessor: Demetrius Greschuk
- Successor: Lawrence Huculak
- Other posts: Titular Bishop of Thyatira, Auxiliary Bishop of Ukrainian Catholic Archeparchy of Winnipeg (1982–1991)

Orders
- Ordination: 10 June 1945 (Priest) by Basil Ladyka
- Consecration: 14 October 1982 (Bishop) by Maxim Hermaniuk

Personal details
- Born: Michael Daciuk; 16 November 1919 Mundare, Alberta, Canada
- Died: January 14, 1996 (aged 76) Edmonton, Canada

Bishop Myron Michael Daciuk, O.S.B.M. (Ukrainian: Мирон Михайло Дацюк; 16 November 1919 in Mundare, Alberta, Canada – 14 January 1996 in Edmonton, Canada) was a Canadian Ukrainian Greek Catholic hierarch. He served as the Titular Bishop of Thyatira and Auxiliary Bishop of Ukrainian Catholic Archeparchy of Winnipeg from 24 June 1982 until 24 October 1991 and as the third Eparchial Bishop of Ukrainian Catholic Eparchy of Edmonton from 24 October 1991 until his death on 14 January 1996.

== Life ==
Bishop Daciuk was born in the family of ethnical Ukrainian Greek-Catholics Luka and Kseniya (née Bruchkovska) Daciuk in Canada. After the school education, he subsequently joined the Order of Saint Basil the Great, where he had a solemn profession on November 15, 1942. Daciuk was ordained as a priest on June 10, 1945, after completed theological studies.

After that he had a various pastoral assignments and served as priest, superior and novice master at the Basilian Institutes in Canada. During 1964-1970 he was a Protohegumen (Provincial Superior) of the Bazilians in Canada.

On June 24, 1982, Fr. Daciuk was nominated by Pope John Paul II and on October 14, 1982, consecrated to the Episcopate as the Titular Bishop of Thyatira and Auxiliary Bishop of Ukrainian Catholic Archeparchy of Winnipeg. The principal consecrator was Metropolitan Maxim Hermaniuk. Bishop Daciuk died on January 14, 1996, in the age 76.

Catholic Church titles
| Preceded by Thomas Dolinay | Titular Bishop of Thyatira; 1982–1991 | Succeeded by Vacant |
| Preceded by Demetrius Greschuk | Eparchial Bishop of Edmonton; 1991–1996 | Succeeded by Lawrence Huculak |
