= Jeronim Chimy =

Jeronim Chimy, O.S.B.M.
- Eparchial Bishop of Ukrainian Catholic Eparchy of New Westminster
- Church: Ukrainian Greek Catholic Church
- Appointed: 27 June 1974
- Term ended: 19 September 1992
- Predecessor: New Creation
- Successor: Severian Yakymyshyn
- Other post: Rector of Ukrainian Pontifical College of Saint Josaphat (1966–1974)

Orders
- Ordination: 29 June 1944 (Priest) by Basil Ladyka
- Consecration: 5 September 1974 (Bishop) by Maxim Hermaniuk

Personal details
- Born: Isidor Chimy; 12 March 1919 Radway, Alberta, Canada
- Died: September 19, 1992 (aged 73) Vancouver, British Columbia, Canada

Bishop Jeronim Isidor Chimy, O.S.B.M. (Ukrainian: Єронім Ісидор Химій; 12 March 1919 – 19 September 1992) was a Canadian Ukrainian Greek Catholic hierarch. He served as the first Eparchial Bishop of Ukrainian Catholic Eparchy of New Westminster from 27 June 1974 until his death on 19 September 1992.

== Life ==
Bishop Chimy was born in Radway, Alberta, Canada in the family of ethnical Ukrainian Greek-Catholics Yevstakhiy and Anna (née Yahniy) Chimy. After the school education, he subsequently joined the Order of Saint Basil the Great, where he had a solemn profession on July 27, 1941. Chimy was ordained as a priest on June 29, 1944, after completed theological studies. Then he continued his studies in the Pontifical Lateran University in Rome, Italy with degree of Doctor of Canon Law in 1966.

After that he had a various pastoral assignments and served as a parish priest, spiritual director and lecturer. From 1961 until 1974 he served in the Basilian General Curia in Rome and also was the Rector of Ukrainian Pontifical College of Saint Josaphat (1966–1974).

On June 27, 1974, Fr. Chimy was nominated by Pope Paul VI and on September 5, 1974 consecrated to the Episcopate as the first Eparchial Bishop of the new created Ukrainian Catholic Eparchy of New Westminster. The principal consecrator was Metropolitan Maxim Hermaniuk. Bishop Chimy died on September 19, 1992 in Vancouver, British Columbia, Canada.

Catholic Church titles
New title	Eparchial Bishop of New Westminster; 1974–1992	Succeeded by Severian Yakymyshyn
