= Ukrainian Catholic Eparchy of Edmonton =

Ukrainian Greek Catholic jurisdiction in Canada

Coordinates: 53°32′N 113°30′W

Eparchy of Edmonton Українська Католицька Едмонтонська Єпархія
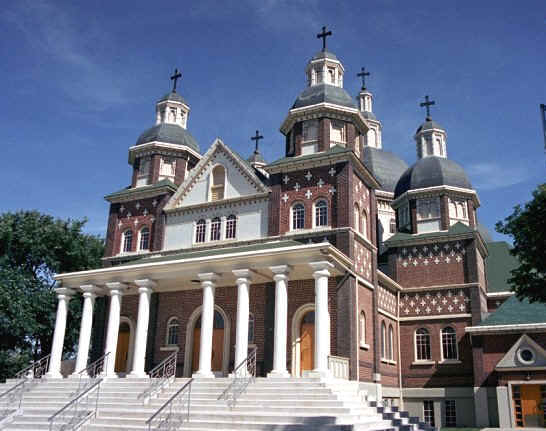
- St. Josaphat Cathedral, the seat of the Eparchy

Location
- Country: Canada
- Ecclesiastical province: Alberta
- Metropolitan: Michael Kwiatkowski Metropolitan of Winnipeg
- Headquarters: Edmonton, Alberta

Statistics
- Population: 25,000
- Parishes: 81

Information
- Denomination: Catholic Church
- Sui iuris church: Ukrainian Greek Catholic Church
- Rite: Byzantine
- Established: November 3, 1956
- Cathedral: Ukrainian Catholic Cathedral of St. Josaphat

Current leadership
- Pope: Leo XIV
- Major Archbishop: Sviatoslav Shevchuk
- Eparch: David Motiuk

Website
- https://www.eeparchy.com/

The Eparchy of Edmonton is a Ukrainian Greek Catholic Church ecclesiastical territory or eparchy of the Catholic Church that governs parishes in the Canadian province of Alberta. It uses the Byzantine Rite liturgy in the Ukrainian language and English language. The eparchy's cathedral is St. Josaphat's Cathedral in the episcopal see of Edmonton, Alberta.

== History ==
On 19 January 1948, it was established as Ukrainian Catholic Apostolic Exarchate of Western Canada (an Eastern Catholic missionary pre-diocesan jurisdiction, akin to a Latin apostolic prefecture), on territory split off from the then Ukrainian Catholic Apostolic Exarchate of Canada.

On 10 March 1951, it was renamed as Ukrainian Catholic Apostolic Exarchate of Edmonton, after its see.

On 3 November 1956, promoted as Ukrainian Catholic Eparchy (Eastern Catholic diocese) of Edmonton. It thus lost its exempt status, becoming a suffragan in the ecclesiastical province of the Metropolitan Ukrainian Catholic Archeparchy of Winnipeg.

On 27 June 1974, it lost territory to establish the Ukrainian Catholic Eparchy of New Westminster.

On January 26, 2007 Pope Benedict XVI appointed former Auxiliary Bishop David Motiuk of the Archeparchy of Winnipeg as head of the Ukrainian Catholic Eparchy of Edmonton.

== Extent ==
As of 2020, the diocese contains 81 parishes, 35 active diocesan and religious priests and 25,000 Catholics. It also has 11 women religious, 4 religious brothers and 8 permanent deacons.

== Bishops ==
=== Ordinaries ===
Apostolic Exarch of Western Canada

- Neil Savaryn, Basilian Order of Saint Josaphat (O.S.B.M.) (1948.01.19 – 1951.03.10 see below), Titular Bishop of Ios (1943.04.03 – 1956.11.03); previously Auxiliary Exarch of Canada of the Ukrainians (Canada) (1943.04.03 – 1948.01.19)

Apostolic Exarchs of Edmonton

- Neil Savaryn, O.S.B.M. (see above 1951.03.10 – 1956.11.03 see below)

Suffragan Eparchs (Diocesan bishops) of Edmonton

- Neil Savaryn, O.S.B.M. (see above 1956.11.03 – death 1986.01.08)
- Demetrius Greschuk (1986 – death 1990), previously Titular Bishop of Nazianzus (1974.06.27 – 1986.04.28) & Auxiliary Eparch of Edmonton of the Ukrainians (Canada) (1974.06.27 – 1986.04.28)
- Myron Daciuk, O.S.B.M. (1991 - death 1996), previously Titular Bishop of Thyatira (1982.06.24 – 1991.10.28) & Auxiliary Bishop of Winnipeg of the Ukrainians (Canada) (1982.06.24 – 1991.10.28)
- Lawrence Huculak, O.S.B.M. (1996.12.16 – 2006.01.09), later Metropolitan Archeparch of Winnipeg of the Ukrainians (Canada) (2006.01.09 – ...)
- David Motiuk (2007- ... ), Titular Bishop of Mathara in Numidia (2002.04.05 – 2007.01.25) & Auxiliary Bishop of Winnipeg of the Ukrainians (Canada) (2002.04.05 – 2007.01.25)

=== Auxiliary bishop ===
- Demetrius Martin Greschuk (1974-1986), appointed Bishop here

=== Other priest of this eparchy who became bishop ===
- Basil (Wasyl) Filevich (Felivich), appointed Bishop of Saskatoon (Ukrainian) in 1983

== Eparchial Logo ==
The golden church dome under a blue sky was a symbol of faith and hope for the Ukrainian Greek Catholics who emigrated to the New World. Today, it remains a recognizable image that is familiar and welcoming to all Albertans, no matter their background. In this representation, logo designer Julian Hayda modelled his dome after St. Mary Ukrainian Catholic Parish in Waugh, Alberta. He explains, “What you see here are two paths, beginning at both East and West, and converging at a pinnacle as two hands holding one cross together.” He is referring to Eastern Catholics in full communion with Rome, joined in the one Catholic Church. The arms reaching upward also reflect our ardent desire to enter into communion with the awesomeness of God through the sacrificial love of Christ represented by the cross.

As in classical iconography, the colour blue also represents divinity. The darker the blue, the more deeply we enter into the life of the Holy Trinity. The circle stands for the eternal nature of God without beginning or end, and the eternal love of God. The golden dome represents the glory of God and its shape represents the vault of heaven.

== Assigned Clergy ==
Listed is the current Clergy assigned to each Church in the Eparchy

| Location | Church | Pastor |
|---|---|---|
| Calgary | Assumption of the BVM | Rev. Roman Planchak |
| Calgary | St. Stephen Protomartyr | Rev. Janko Herbut |
| Camrose District | Protection of the BVM | Very Rev. Mark Bayrock |
| Calmar | Holy Trinity | |
| Calmar (Farms) | Immaculate Conception | |
| Daysland | Assumption of the BVM | |
| Hay Lakes | Exaltation of the Holy Cross | |
| Holden (Farms) | Presentation of the BVM | |
| Holden | Descent of the Holy Spirit | |
| Leduc | Holy Trinity | |
| Roundhill | Transfiguration of Our Lord | |
| Thorsby | St. John the Baptist | |
| Edmonton | Dormition of the Most Holy Mother of God__ | Rev. Peter Babej |
| Edmonton | Exaltation of the Holy Cross | Rev. Janko Herbut |
| Edmonton | Holy Eucharist | Very Rev. Mihajlo Planchak |
| Edmonton | Protection of BVM | Rev. Serhiy Harahuc |
| Edmonton | St. Basil the Great | Rev. Josaphat Tyrkalo, O.S.B.M (Pastor & Rector) Rev. Thomas Kobak, O.S.B.M (1st Assistant) Rev. Mark Zazula, O.S.B.M (2nd Assistant) |
| Edmonton | St. George | Rev. Anton Tarasenko, Rev. Stanislav Bjeli (Assistant) |
| Edmonton | St. Josaphat Cathedral | Rev. Mykhaylo Bohun, Pastor |
| Edmonton | St. Nicholas | Rev. Julian Bilyj |
| Edmonton | St. Vladimir | Rev. Ivan Nykyforuk |
| Grande Prairie District | Dormition of the Most Holy Mother of God | Rev. Mark Sych |
| High Prairie | Christ the King | |
| Hines Creek | All Saints | |
| Manning | Ascension of Our Lord | |
| Reno | Descent of the Holy Spirit | |
| Lethbridge | St. Peter and Paul | Rev. Gary Sedgwick |
| Mundare District | Sts. Peter and Paul | (Served by the Basilian Fathers) |
| Vegreville | Holy Trinity | |
| Lamont | St. John the Baptist | |
| Borshchiw | St. John the Baptist | |
| Krakow | Protection of the BVM | |
| St. Michael | St. Nicholas | |
| Skaro | Exaltation of the Holy Cross | |
| Star-Peno | Assumption of the BVM | |
| Chipman | Nativity of BVM | |
| Delph | Presentation of the BVM | |
| Hilliard | St. Dymytro | |
| Leeshore | Nativity of the BVM | |
| Limestone | St. Michael the Archangel | |
| Red Deer | St. Vladimir | Rev. Jim Nakonechny |
| Redwater District | Sts. Borys and Hlib | Rev. Slavko Dumec |
| Athabasca | Assumption of the BVM | |
| Carvel | St. Nicholas | |
| Darling | Descent of the Holy Spirit | |
| Rossington | St. Michael the Archangel | |
| Thorhild | Holy Eucharist | |
| Waskatenau | Descent of the Holy Spirit | |
| Waugh | Assumption of the BVM | |
| Cherhill | Holy Eucharist | |
| Eldorena | Protection of the BVM | |
| Fedorah | Ascension of Our Lord | |
| Frains | Holy Eucharist | |
| Manly | St. George | |
| New Pine Creek | St. Anthony | |
| Prosperity | Holy Trinity | |
| Radway | Assumption of the BVM | |
| Rochfort Bridge | St. John the Baptist | |
| Smoky Lake District | | Rev. Don Bodnar |
| Smoky Lake | Sts. Volodymyr and Olga | |
| Buchach | St. Nicholas | |
| Lac la Biche (Craigend) | Protection of the BVM | |
| Innisfree | St. Josaphat | |
| New Kiew | Ascension of Our Lord | |
| Plain Lake | Holy Trinity | |
| Spedden | Holy Trinity | |
| Stry | Holy Eucharist | |
| Two Hills | Sts. Volodymyr and Olga | |
| Smoky Lake (Farms) | St. Paraskevia | |
| Vilna | Descent of the Holy Spirit | |
| St. Paul District | Protection of the BVM | Rev. Andrij Nykyforuk |
| Bonnyville | Descent of the Holy Spirit | |
| Derwent | Descent of the Holy Spirit | |
| Derwent(Farms) | Ascension of Our Lord | |
| Myrnam | Assumption of the BVM | |
| Elk Point | Holy Eucharist | |
| Glendon | Assumption of the BVM | |
| Iron River | St. John the Baptist | |
| Angle Lake | Nativity of BVM | |
| Northern Valley | St. John the Baptist | |
| Sherwood Park | St. Sophia | Rev. Rendall Yackimec |
| Vermilion/Lloydminster District | | Rev. Mike Bombak |
| Vermilion | St. Olha | |
| Lloydminster | Descent of the Holy Spirit | |
| Fidelity | St. John the Evangelist | |

== Sources and external links ==
- Official website
- GigaCatholic, with incumbent biography links
