= Ukrainian Catholic Eparchy of Toronto and Eastern Canada =

Ukrainian Catholic ecclesiastical jurisdiction in Canada

Coordinates: 43.6833°N 79.4667°W

Eparchy of Toronto and Eastern Canada Eparchia Torontinus Ucrainorum Українська Католицька Єпархія Торонто й Східньої Канади
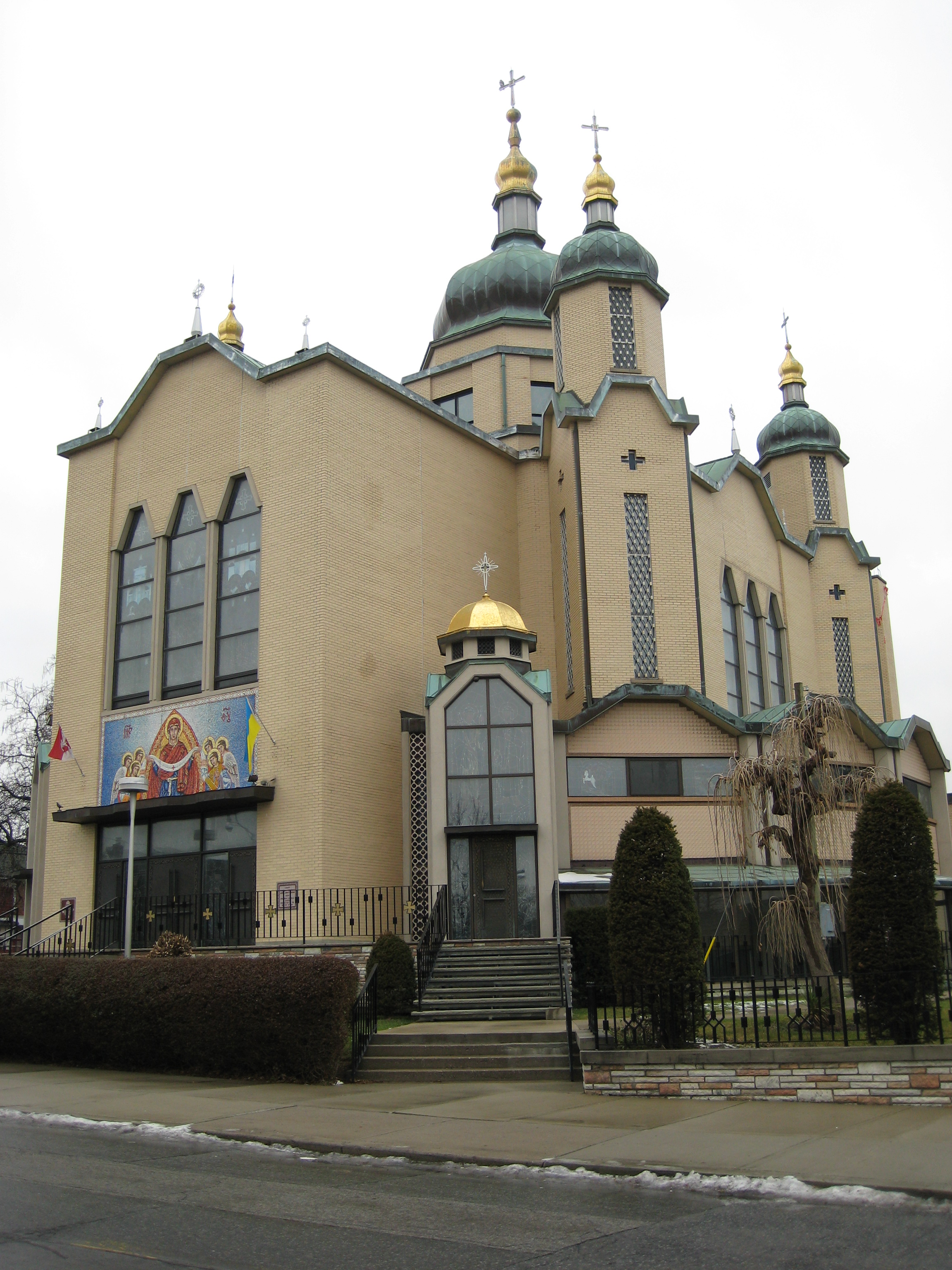
- Church Of The Holy Protection

Location
- Territory: Ontario and Eastern Canada
- Ecclesiastical province: Archeparchy of Winnipeg
- Headquarters: Toronto, Ontario, Canada
- Population: 36,910

Information
- Denomination: Catholic Church
- Sui iuris church: Ukrainian Greek Catholic Church
- Rite: Byzantine Rite
- Established: November 3, 1956
- Cathedral: St. Josaphat Cathedral

Current leadership
- Pope: Leo XIV
- Major Archbishop: Sviatoslav Shevchuk
- Bishop: Bryan Bayda, CSsR
- Metropolitan Archbishop: Michael Kwiatkowski Archbishop of Winnipeg

Website
- www.ucet.ca

The Eparchy of Toronto and Eastern Canada is a Ukrainian Greek Catholic Church ecclesiastical territory or eparchy of the Catholic Church in the eastern part of Canada, primarily Ontario.

The eparchy is a suffragan in the ecclesiastical province of the metropolitan Ukrainian Catholic Archeparchy of Winnipeg. Its cathedral is St. Josaphat’s Cathedral, in the episcopal see of Toronto. The eparchy also administers a national shrine, the St. John the Baptist Ukrainian Catholic National Shrine, in Ottawa. On 28 April 2022 Pope Francis named Eparch Bryan Bayda of the Eparchy of Saskatoon as eparchial bishop.

== History ==
Established on 19 January 1948 as Apostolic Exarchate of Eastern Canada, from territory split off from the then Apostolic Exarchate of Canada. On 10 March 1951 it was renamed as Apostolic Exarchate of Toronto. On 3 November 1956 it was elevated to the Eparchy of Toronto, losing its missionary pre-diocesan and exempt status.

== Extent ==
Parishes under the authority of the eparchy are located in Ontario, Quebec, and Nova Scotia.

In 2007, the diocese contained 75 parishes, 96 active diocesan and religious priests, and 36,910 Catholics. It also had 36 women religious, 15 religious brothers, and 19 permanent deacons.

In 2010, Bishop Stephen Chmilar gave the blessing for the creation of the Eparchial Office of Youth Ministry, with the mission of promoting the involvement of young adults within the church. This office is currently under the direction of Andrew Figol.

== Bishops ==
=== Episcopal ordinaries ===
Apostolic Exarch of Eastern Canada

- Isidore Borecky (1948.03.03 – 1951.03.10 see below), Titular Bishop of Amathus in Cypro (1948.03.03 – 1956.11.03)

Apostolic Exarch of Toronto

- Isidore Borecky (see above 1951.03.10-1956.11.03 see below)

Suffragan Eparchs of Toronto

- Isidore Borecky (see above 1956.11.03-1998.06.16)
- Apostolic Administrator sede plena 1992.12.16 – 1998.06.16) Roman Danylak, Titular Bishop of Nyssa (1992.12.16 – 2012.10.07)
- Cornelius Pasichny, O.S.B.M. (1998.07.01 – 2003.05.03)
- Stephen Chmilar (2003.05.03 – 2019.11.09)
- Apostolic Administrator (9 November 2019 – 28 April 2022) Bryan Bayda, CSsR, Bishop of Saskatun
- Bryan Bayda, CSsR (since 28 April 2022)

=== Auxiliary bishop ===
- Michael Rusnak, C.SS.R. (1964-1980), appointed Bishop of Saints Cyril and Methodius of Toronto (Slovak)

=== Other priest of this diocese who became bishop ===
- Basil Filevich (priest here, 1948-1951), appointed Eparch of Saskatoon in 1983

== See also ==
- Archdiocese of Toronto

== Sources and external links ==
- Official website
- GigaCatholic, with incumbent biography links
- Holy Spirit Seminary, Edmonton
