= Stephen Chmilar =

Canadian Ukrainian Greek Catholic bishop (1945–2024)

- Eparchial Bishop Emeritus of Ukrainian Catholic Eparchy of Toronto
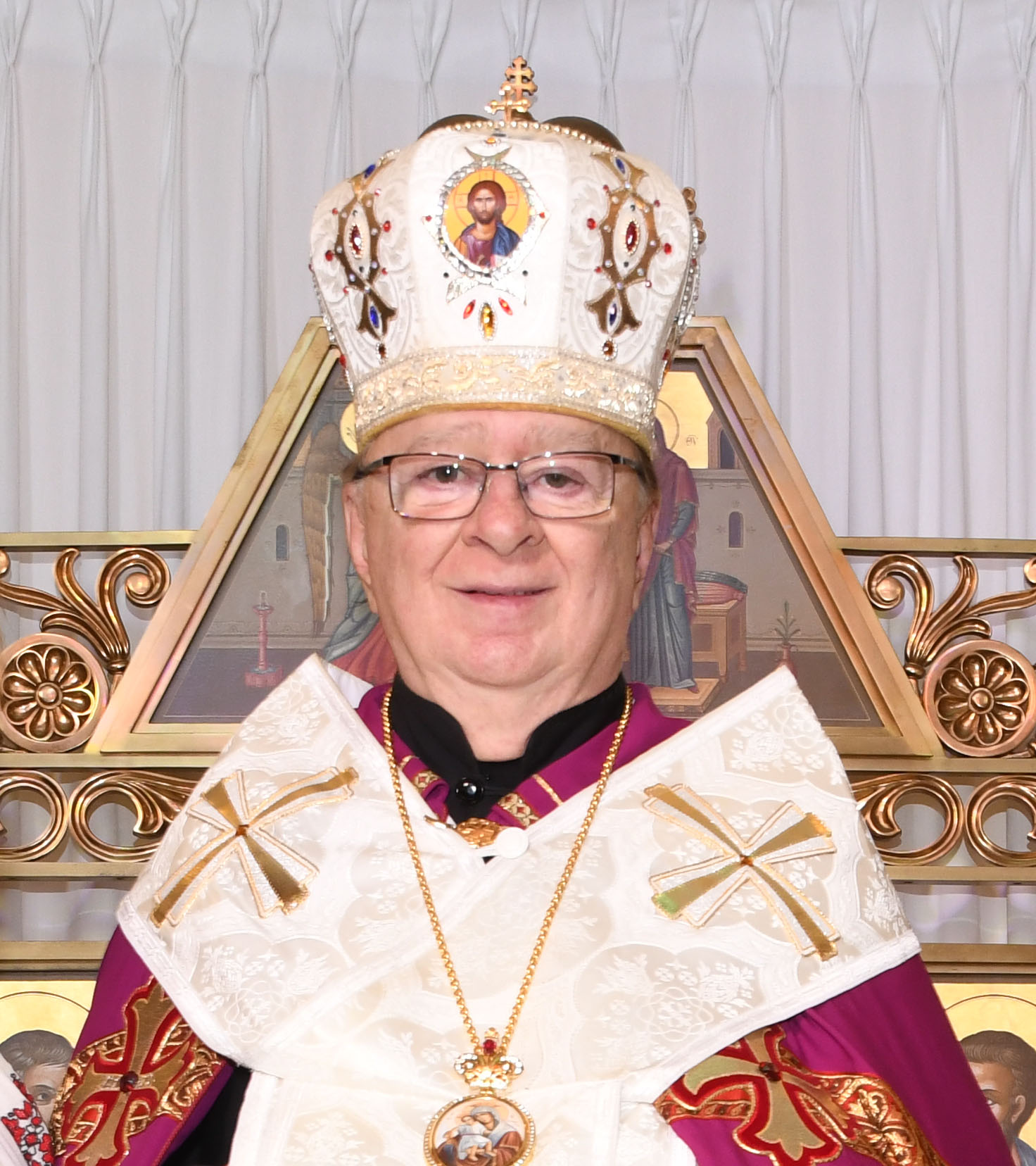
- Chmilar in 2020
- Church: Ukrainian Greek Catholic Church
- Appointed: 3 May 2003
- Term ended: 9 November 2019
- Predecessor: Cornelius Pasichny
- Successor: Bryan Bayda (as Apostolic Administrator)

Orders
- Ordination: 11 June 1972 (Priest) by Neil Savaryn
- Consecration: 23 July 2003 (Bishop) by Lubomyr Husar

Personal details
- Born: Stephen Victor Chmilar; 24 May 1945 Lamont, Alberta, Canada
- Died: 21 December 2024 (aged 79) Stoney Creek, Ontario, Canada
- Coat of arms

Stephen Victor Chmilar (Ukrainian: Стефан Віктор Хміляр; 24 May 1945 – 21 December 2024) was a Canadian Ukrainian Greek Catholic hierarch. He served as Eparchial Bishop of Ukrainian Catholic Eparchy of Toronto from 3 May 2003 until his retirement on 9 November 2019.

== Biography ==
Bishop Chmilar was born in the family of ethnical Ukrainian Greek-Catholics in Lamont, Alberta, Canada. After the school education, he subsequently joined the Order of Saint Basil the Great, where he had a solemn profession on 17 November 1968. Chmilar was ordained as a priest on 11 June 1972, after studies at the University of Ottawa (1966–1968) with bachelor's degree in philosophy and Saint Paul University in Ottawa (1968–1972) with bachelor's degree in theology.

After that he had a various pastoral assignments and served as a parish priest, spiritual director and director of the Christian summer camps at the Basilian and another ecclesiastical Institutes in Canada. In 1991 he left the Basilian Order and was incardinated in the Ukrainian Eparchy of Toronto.

On 3 May 2003, Chmilar was nominated by Pope John Paul II and on 23 July 2003 consecrated to the Episcopate as the third Eparchial Bishop of the Ukrainian Catholic Eparchy of Toronto. The principal consecrator was Cardinal Lubomyr Husar, the Head of the Ukrainian Greek-Catholic Church.

Bishop Chmilar retired on 9 November 2019, before reaching the age limit of 75. He died on the morning of 21 December 2024, at the age of 79 in Stoney Creek, Ontario.

Catholic Church titles
| Preceded by Cornelius Pasichny | Bishop of Toronto and the Eastern Canada; 2003–2019 | Succeeded by Bryan Bayda (as Apostolic Administrator) |
