= Sally Read =

English poet and writer (born 1971)

Sally Read (born 1971) is an English poet and writer and former psychiatric nurse.

== Early life and education ==
Sally Read was born in 1971 in Suffolk and attended Tavistock Comprehensive School. She received a BA from Open University and then an MA from the University of South Dakota.

== Work and awards ==
Read shared the Eric Gregory Award in 2001. Her first collection, The Point of Splitting, was shortlisted for the Jerwood-Aldeburgh First Collection prize. A selection of her works, Punto di Rottura, is also available in Italian. Her poems have been anthologized in numerous volumes, including "Roddy Lumsden's Identity Parade and Forward's Poems of the Decade. Read's first collection of poetry since her conversion, Dawn of this Hunger took first place for poetry at the Catholic Media Association Awards in 2022. She has also written for the Times Literary Supplement, The Catholic Herald, The Tablet, The Humanum Review and Magnificat among other periodicals and papers. Read has also published two memoirs: Night's Bright Darkness (2016) (see below) and The Mary Pages (2024), which was awarded best biography in the 2025 Association of Catholic Publishers awards. Read's book Annunciation was the subject of a short film for EWTNGB by Norman Servais and Kevin Turley. She is editor of Word on Fire's 100 Great Catholic Poems (Nov 2023), and she teaches the art of writing poetry online at Sally's Poetry School.

== Religious and personal life ==
A lifelong atheist, Read converted to Catholicism in 2010. She wrote a book about her conversion experience, Night's Bright Darkness.

Read was poet in residence from 2011-2021 at The Hermitage of the Three Holy Hierarchs, which is an eparchial-rite form of consecrated life under the jurisdiction of Bishop Bryan Bayda, the Eparch of Ukrainian Catholic Eparchy of Saskatoon. Fr. Gregory Hrynkiw, of the group, played a role in her conversion. Read's role in the hermitage continues, as a member.

Read lives with her husband and daughter (Celia Florence, to whom her book “Annunciation: A Call to Faith in a Broken World” is dedicated) in Santa Marinella.

== Works ==
- The Point of Splitting (Bloodaxe Books, 2005)
- Broken Sleep (Bloodaxe Books, 2009)
- The Day Hospital (Bloodaxe Books, 2012)
- Night's Bright Darkness: A Modern Conversion Story (Ignatius Press, 2016) (Translated into Polish, Slovene, Slovak and Czech)
- Annunciation: A Call to Faith in a Broken World (Ignatius Press, 2019)
- Dawn of this Hunger (Angelico Press, Second Spring, 2021)
- 100 Great Catholic Poems (Word on Fire, November 2023), edited and commentary by Read
- The Mary Pages (Word on Fire, 2024)
- Bell and the Joyful Mysteries (Votive, 2026)
- The Secrets to Reading Poetry: Unlocking the Language of God (Luminor, 2026)
