= Fedir Danylak =

Ukrainian dancer (born 1955)

- Федір Іванович Даниляк
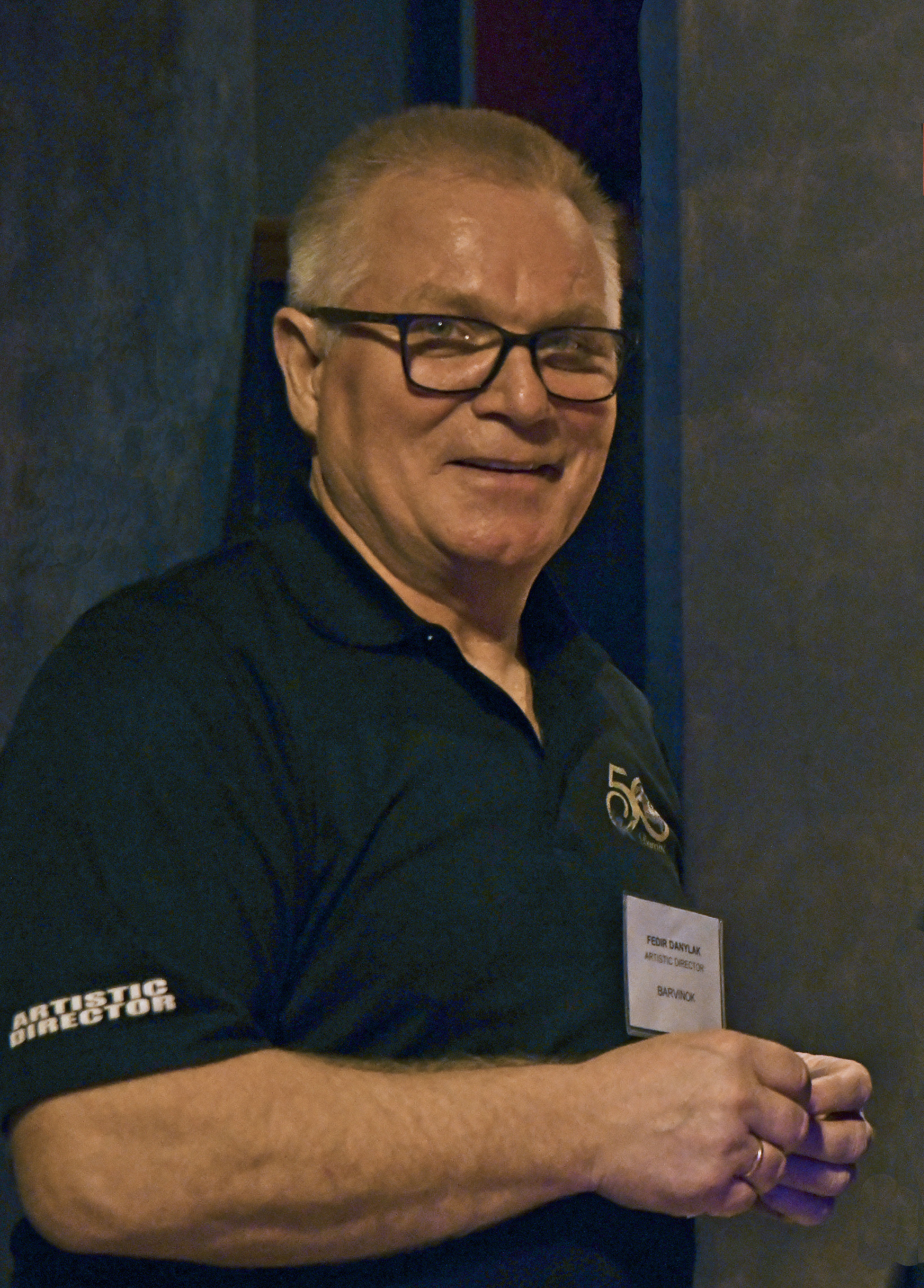
- Danylak in 2020
- Born: Fedir Ivanovych Danylak; 2 September 1955 (age 70); Pukiv, Ukrainian SSR, Soviet Union
- Education: Kalush School of Culture; Kyiv State Institute of Culture
- Occupations: Dancer; choreographer
- Years active: 1982–present
- Spouse: Hrystyna
- Children: 1
- Relatives: Roman Danylak (cousin)

Fedir Ivanovych Danylak (Ukrainian: Федір Іванович Даниляк; born 1955) is a Ukrainian-born Canadian dancer, balletmaster, and choreographer. He also serves as the artistic director of the Barvinok Ukrainian School of Dance in Mississauga, Ontario, Canada.

== Early life and education ==
Danylak was born on September 2, 1955 in Pukiv, Ukrainian SSR (present-day Ivano-Frankivsk Oblast, western Ukraine). As a child, he studied basic choreography and performed for the local population.

In 1972, he enrolled at the Kalush School of Culture (now Kalush College of Culture and Arts) to study dance professionally under Maria Lyashkevych, an experienced performer and instructor.

After graduating from the Kalush School in 1976, Danylak began his career as a choreographer by joining the Hutsul Ensemble of Song and Dance, a professional Ukrainian ensemble based at the Ivano-Frankivsk Regional Philharmonic. He met his future wife, Hrystyna, in Ivano-Frankivsk.

Danylak continued his studies in 1978 at the Kyiv State Institute of Culture. There, he earned a diploma in choreography and took advanced dance courses.

== Career in Ukraine ==
Upon completing his second period of higher education in 1982, Danylak accepted a position as a professor of choreography at the Kalush School of Culture. He was appointed during a period when Ukrainian cultural traditions were gaining renewed attention. Influenced by this activity and his mentor Lyashkevych's interest in traditional dance, Danylak began developing choreography based on traditional practices.

Danylak became the first mentor in Kalush to teach the discipline of "Ukrainian Dance," with a particular focus on the dances of ethnographic groups in the Carpathian region. His syllabus became a permanent fixture of the school's curriculum. Danylak founded one of the first Ukrainian folk dance ensembles, "Merezhyvo," which served as an extension of the Kalush College. Danylak was hired to perform in an amateur ensemble, Pokuttya, in the nearby city of Kolomyia. Danylak performed with the Pokuttya ensemble in Kolomyia. As of 2021, Merezhyvo remains active.

== Career in Canada ==
In late 1996, Danylak and his family immigrated to Toronto, Canada. The city's Ukrainian community enabled Danylak to continue his career as a teacher and choreographer. In his first year in Toronto, Danylak taught Ukrainian dance at Ukrainian dance schools. His work with Vesnianka and the Academy of Ukrainian Dance provided him with experience teaching within the Ukrainian diaspora.

=== Teaching career ===
According to Canadian education standards, Danylak's university diploma from Ukraine was considered equivalent to a bachelor's degree from the University of Toronto. He worked as a substitute teacher at the Toronto District School Board, eventually earning an Ontario College of Teachers diploma, which allowed him to become a fully qualified teacher in Ontario. He undertook specialized coursework and, in time, became a fully qualified special education teacher. With support from Lesa Semsecen, then a vice principal at Toronto's Elmbank Junior Middle Academy, he was hired as a special education teacher at the school.

=== Barvinok ===
In 1997, Danylak became the artistic director of the Barvinok ensemble, after being introduced to the executive committee of the Barvinok Ukrainian Dance Ensemble by his friend Myroslava Cummings. Before that, he had a trial period at the Barvinok Ukrainian School of Dance. Support from dancers' parents gave Danylak the opportunity to expand the dance repertoire at the school.

In 2000, the group made its first trip to Ukraine. The visit concluded with a first-place award at the International Ukrainian Dance Competition in Yalta. The ensemble participated in numerous festivals and formal events during this period. When Danylak began, the school had around 100 students. By the 2009–2010 academic year, enrolment had increased to around 400 dancers. In 2004, the group's second trip to Ukraine took place. They performed in Kharkiv during the city's 350th anniversary celebrations and for audiences on Ukraine's Independence Day.

Danylak with Ukrainian president Viktor Yushchenko in 2008

With the help of the school's parent committee, Danylak organized a third trip to Ukraine in 2008 as a commemorative tour marking 40 years since the creation of the Barvinok Ukrainian School of Dance. This tour featured performances in Lviv, Pukiv, Rohatyn, Ternopil, and Kyiv. The Holodomor dance suite, choreographed and produced by Danylak, was among the dances performed. Created to commemorate the millions of victims of the 1932–1933 man-made famine in Ukraine, it was performed at the annual Ukrainian World Congress in front of the then-president Viktor Yuschenko and prime minister Yulia Tymoshenko of Ukraine. The work was later performed at an event commemorating the victims of the Holodomor on November 29, 2008, in Toronto, Canada.

==== List of dances ====
Danylak organizing the Reception of the Ukrainian President in 2009

During his time as Barvinok's artistic director, Danylak choreographed dances from every region of Ukraine for students of all ages. This is a partial list of Ukrainian folk dances choreographed by Danylak, which also includes Latin and ballroom suites:

1. Hopak
2. Volyn
3. Holodomor Suite
4. Wedding Suites
5. Prykarpattya Suites
6. Hutsul Suites
7. Malanka Night
8. Wild Dances
9. Buko
10. Lemko Dance
11. Zakarpattya Dance
12. Vasylechky
13. Vyjdy Hryciu
14. Welcome Suites
15. Oj Na Hori Kalyna
16. Come Out Hryhorij
17. Gypsy
18. Welcoming Dance

There are many more dances choreographed by Danylak not featured here, including dozens for dancers from ages 5 to 29.

=== Community ===
In addition to his role as a choreographer and artistic director of Barvinok, Danylak also participates in the Ukrainian community as a producer and director of various festivals and community events. Recently, he produced the entertainment program at the celebration of Ukrainian Independence at Centennial Park in Toronto. He was also one of the organizers of the Ukrainian Dance Festival.

== Personal life ==
Danylak lives in Mississauga, Ontario. He has been married to his wife, Hrystyna, for 29 years. Danylak is also a cousin of Roman Danylak, bishop of the Ukrainian Greek Catholic Church.
