= Savaryn =

Savaryn is a slavic surname. Notable people with the surname include:

- Neil Savaryn (1905–1986), Ukrainian-born Canadian Ukrainian Greek-Catholic bishop
- Peter Savaryn (1926–2017), Ukrainian-born Canadian lawyer
