= Michael Kwiatkowski =

Michael Kwiatkowski may refer to:

- Michael Kwiatkowski (bishop) (born 1961), Canadian Ukrainian Greek Catholic bishop
- Michał Kwiatkowski (born 1990), Polish professional road bicycle racer
- Michal (singer) (born 1983), Polish singer
