= Roman Danylak =

Canadian-Ukrainian Catholic bishop (1930–2012)

The Most Reverend Roman Danylak
- Titular Bishop of Nyssa
- Church: Ukrainian Greek Catholic Church
- Diocese: Titular see of Nyssa
- See: Nyssa
- Appointed: 16 December 1992
- Installed: 16 December 1992
- Term ended: 16 June 1998
- Other post: Apostolic Administrator sede plena of the Ukrainian Catholic Eparchy of Toronto and Eastern Canada (1992–1998)

Personal details
- Born: Roman Danylak; December 29, 1930 Toronto, Ontario, Canada
- Died: October 7, 2012 (aged 81) Toronto, Ontario, Canada
- Denomination: Catholic (Ukrainian Greek Catholic)
- Education: Pontifical Urbaniana University (Lic. S.Th.); Pontifical Lateran University (J.C.D./civil law)

Roman Danylak (December 29, 1930 – October 7, 2012) was a Canadian Ukrainian Catholic bishop.

== Early life and education ==
Roman Danylak was born in Toronto, Canada on December 29, 1930. He was ordained to the Catholic priesthood in 1957 at St. Josaphat's Seminary Chapel in Rome and ministered to Ukrainian Catholics in Canada. He received a licentiate of sacred theology from the Pontifical Urbaniana University and a doctorate of canon and civil law from the Pontifical Lateran University.

== Career ==
From 1973–1990, Father Danylak served as a consultor to the Pontifical Commission for the Revision of Canon Law for the Eastern Churches.

In 1992, while serving as the rector of St. Josaphat Cathedral and chancellor of the eparchal chancery, he was appointed Apostolic administrator sede plena of the Ukrainian Catholic Eparchy of Toronto and titular bishop of Nyssa by Pope John Paul II. His appointment proved controversial, as the incumbent bishop, 81-year-old Isidore Borecky, refused to retire even though he had passed the mandatory retirement age of 75 established by canon law. It was also rumored that Borecky had requested a coadjutor or auxiliary bishop, not an administrator, and that Father Danylak had not been nominated for the position by the Ukrainian Synod. After six years of conflict between the two bishops, Bishop Lubomyr Husar, Apostolic administrator of Lviv, negotiated a resolution whereby Borecky retired and Danylak was reassigned to "special responsibilities in Rome", resulting in the vacancy of the Toronto eparchy effective June 24, 1998. Bishop Cornelius Pasichny of Saskatoon was appointed the new bishop on July 1 of that year.

In Rome, Danylak served as a canon of the Basilica di Santa Maria Maggiore.

== Death ==
Danylak died at age 81 in Toronto on October 7, 2012.

== Views ==
Danylak supported certain individuals who claimed to have seen visions of Jesus and Mary:

- The Garabandal apparitions
- Maria Valtorta and her work The Poem of the Man-God
- Eucharistic miracles of Naju, South Korea
