= Severian Yakymyshyn =

Canadian Ukrainian Greek Catholic bishop (1930–2021)

Severian Yakymyshyn, O.S.B.M.
- Eparchial Bishop of Ukrainian Catholic Eparchy of New Westminster
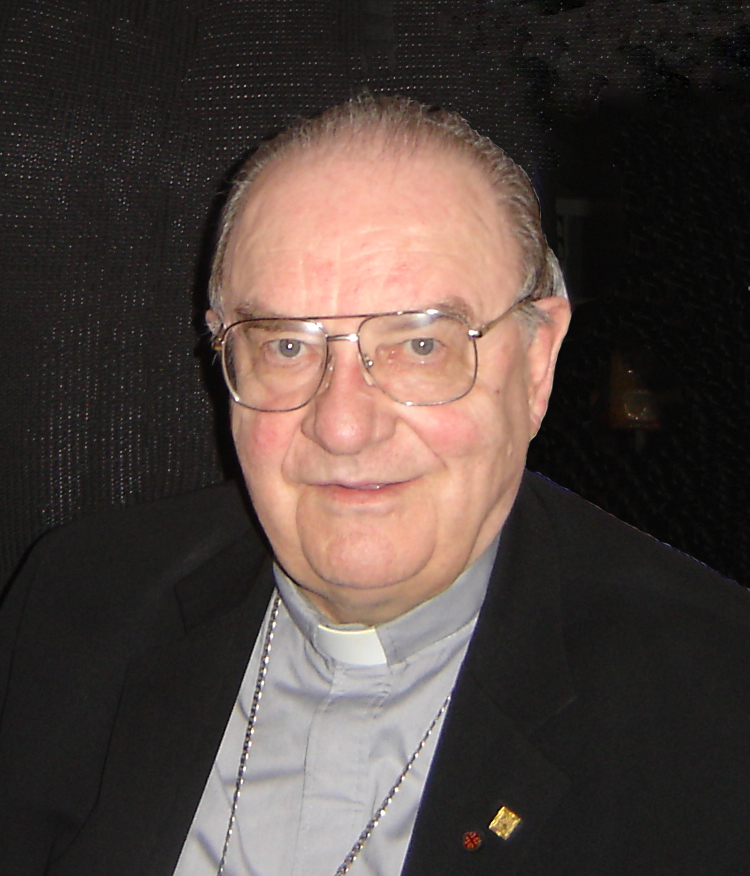
- Church: Ukrainian Greek Catholic Church
- Appointed: 5 January 1995
- Term ended: 1 June 2007
- Predecessor: Jeronim Chimy
- Successor: Kenneth Nowakowski

Orders
- Ordination: 19 May 1955 (Priest) by Ivan Buchko
- Consecration: 25 March 1995 (Bishop) by Maxim Hermaniuk

Personal details
- Born: Stefan Yakymyshyn; 22 April 1930 Plain Lake, Alberta, Canada
- Died: 6 September 2021 (aged 91) Vancouver, British Columbia, Canada

Bishop Severian Stefan Yakymyshyn, O.S.B.M. (Ukrainian: Северіян Стефан Якимишин; 22 April 1930 – 6 September 2021) was a Canadian Ukrainian Greek Catholic hierarch. He served as an Eparchial Bishop of Ukrainian Catholic Eparchy of New Westminster from 5 January 1995 until his retirement 1 June 2007.

== Life ==
Bishop Yakymyshyn was born in the family of ethnical Ukrainian Greek-Catholics in Canada. After the school education, he subsequently joined the Order of Saint Basil the Great, where he had a solemn profession on January 1, 1953. Yakymyshyn was ordained as a priest on May 19, 1955, after he completed theological studies. Then he continued his studies in the Pontifical Gregorian University in Rome, Italy with degree of Doctor of Sacred Theology.

After that he had various pastoral assignments and served as a parish priest, spiritual director, master of novices and lecturer at St. Paul University in Ottawa. From 1979 until 1995 he served in the Basilian General Curia in Rome.

On January 5, 1995, Fr. Yakymyshyn was nominated by Pope John Paul II and on March 25, 1995 consecrated to the Episcopate as the second Eparchial Bishop of the Ukrainian Catholic Eparchy of New Westminster. The principal consecrator was Metropolitan Maxim Hermaniuk. Bishop Yakymyshyn retired on June 1, 2007, after reaching the age limit.

Bishop Yakymyshyn died in Vancouver at the age 91.

Catholic Church titles
Preceded by Jeronim Chimy	Eparchial Bishop of New Westminster; 1995–2007	Succeeded by Kenneth Nowakowski
