= Paul Jiang Taoran =

- Bishop of Zhengding
- Native name: 蔣陶然
- Church: Catholic Church
- Diocese: Diocese of Zhengding
- In office: 21 May 1989 – 15 November 2010
- Predecessor: Julius Jia Zhiguo

Orders
- Ordination: 1953
- Consecration: 21 May 1989 by Joseph Zong Huaide

Personal details
- Born: 27 July 1926 Qingyuanzhen (south of present-day Lianchi), Zhili, Republic of China
- Died: 15 November 2010 (aged 84) Shijiazhuang, Hebei, China

Paul Jiang Taoran (27 July 1926 – 15 November 2010 Shijazhuang, Hebei, China) was the Roman Catholic bishop of the Roman Catholic Diocese of Zhengding. Ordained to the priesthood in 1953, he was ordained bishop by the Chinese Patriotic Catholic Association, without approval from the Vatican. However, in 2008, Pope Benedict XVI gave his approval.
