= Demetrius Greschuk =

Canadian Ukrainian Greek Catholic hierarch (1923–1990)

- Eparchial Bishop of Ukrainian Catholic Eparchy of Edmonton
- Church: Ukrainian Greek Catholic Church
- Appointed: 28 April 1986
- Term ended: 8 July 1990
- Predecessor: Neil Savaryn
- Successor: Myron Daciuk
- Other posts: Titular Bishop of Nazianzus, Auxiliary Bishop of Ukrainian Catholic Eparchy of Edmonton (1974–1986)

Orders
- Ordination: 11 June 1950 (Priest) by Neil Savaryn
- Consecration: 3 October 1974 (Bishop) by Neil Savaryn

Personal details
- Born: Demetrius Martin Greschuk; 7 November 1923 Innisfree, Alberta, Canada
- Died: July 8, 1990 (aged 66) Edmonton, Alberta, Canada

Bishop Demetrius Martin Greschuk (Ukrainian: Дмитро Мартин Ґрещук; 7 November 1923 in Innisfree, Alberta, Canada – 8 July 1990 in Edmonton, Canada) was a Canadian Ukrainian Greek Catholic hierarch. He served as the Titular Bishop of Nazianzus and Auxiliary Bishop of the Ukrainian Catholic Eparchy of Edmonton from 27 June 1974 until 28 April 1986 and as the second Eparchial Bishop of the Ukrainian Catholic Eparchy of Edmonton from 28 April 1986 until his death on 8 July 1990.

== Life ==
Bishop Greschuk was born in the family of ethnical Ukrainian Greek-Catholics in Canada. After the school education, he subsequently studied philosophy and theology in the St. Augustine Theological Seminary in Toronto. Greschuk was ordained as a priest on June 11, 1950 after completed theological studies.

After that he had various pastoral assignments and served as a parish priest in the different parishes of his native Ukrainian Catholic Eparchy of Edmonton.

On June 27, 1974, Fr. Greschuk was nominated by Pope Paul VI and on October 3, 1974 consecrated to the Episcopate as the Titular Bishop of Nazianzus and Auxiliary Bishop of Ukrainian Catholic Eparchy of Edmonton. The principal consecrator was Bishop Neil Savaryn. Bishop Greschuk died on July 8, 1990, at the age of 66.

Catholic Church titles
Preceded by Salvatore Rotolo	Titular Bishop of Nazianzus; 1974–1986	Succeeded by Miguel Mykycej
Preceded by Neil Savaryn	Eparchial Bishop of Edmonton; 1986–1990	Succeeded by Myron Daciuk
