= Michael Kwiatkowski (bishop) =

Canadian Ukrainian Greek Catholic archbishop

- Metropolitan Archbishop of Archeparchy of Winnipeg
- Church: Ukrainian Greek Catholic Church
- Appointed: 9 July 2026
- Predecessor: Lawrence Huculak
- Previous posts: Chancellor of Archeparchy of Winnipeg (2014–2023), Eparchial Bishop of New Westminster (2023–2026)

Orders
- Ordination: 28 July 1986 (Priest) by Maxim Hermaniuk
- Consecration: 8 November 2023 (Bishop) by Lawrence Huculak

Personal details
- Born: Michael Kwiatkowski; 21 November 1961 (age 64) Hamiota, Manitoba, Canada
- Denomination: Ukrainian Greek Catholic
- Education: Pontifical University of Saint Thomas Aquinas, Pontifical Oriental Institute
- Motto: Служитимо Господеві (Let us serve the Lord)
- Coat of arms

Archbishop Michael Kwiatkowski (Ukrainian: Михайло Квятковський; born 21 November 1961) is a Canadian Ukrainian Catholic hierarch, who has served as Metropolitan Archbishop of Archeparchy of Winnipeg since 2026. He previously served as the fourth Eparchial Bishop of the Ukrainian Catholic Eparchy of New Westminster since 24 August 2023 until 9 July 2026.

== Early life and education ==
Bishop Michael Kwiatkowski was born on 21 November 1961 in Hamiota, Manitoba as the third of seven children in the family of Edward Kwiatkowski and Phyllis Zemliak. Later, his father Edward (1929–2021) become a priest. He received an incomplete secondary education at a school in Brandon, Manitoba and completed secondary education at Saint Vladimir's College and the Minor Seminary in Roblin, Manitoba.

After starting his studies at the university and working at the same time, he joined the seminary in 1980. In Rome, he resided at the Ukrainian Pontifical College of Saint Josaphat and studied at the Pontifical University of Saint Thomas Aquinas (Angelicum), where he obtained bachelor's degrees in philosophy (1980–1982) and theology (1982–1985). He was ordained as a deacon on 14 September 1985 and as a priest on 28 July 1986. Both ordinations were made by Metropolitan Maxim Hermaniuk for the Ukrainian Catholic Archeparchy of Winnipeg.

After served as an assistant priest at the parish of the Intercession of the Most Holy Theotokos in Winnipeg, he returned to Rome to study the Eastern Catholic canon law at the Pontifical Oriental Institute with the Doctorate in Canon Law degree.

== Pastoral and educational career ==
From 1996 to 2006, during the period when the Ukrainian Greek-Catholic Church was strengthening after many years of the Communist persecutions, Father Kwiatkowski resided in Ukraine. Served as chancellor of the Patriarchal Curia and judge and chairman of the Major Archbishop's Tribunal. He was also vice-rector of the Ukrainian Catholic University in Lviv, where he taught canon law and headed the pastoral department for 6 years.

After returning to Canada, he was appointed priest of the Ukrainian Greek-Catholic Seminary of the Holy Spirit in Ottawa (2006–2010). From 2010 to 2021, he served as a parish priest of the Holy Eucharist, and from 2021 to 2023, he was the parish priest of the Church of the Intercession of the Holy Mother of God in Winnipeg. During 2014–2023 Father Kwiatkowski served as chancellor of his native Ukrainian Catholic Archeparchy of Winnipeg, and was the representative of this circumscription in the Pastoral Council of the Ukrainian Greek Catholic Church since its foundation in 2019.

== Bishop ==
On 24 August 2023 he was appointed by Pope Francis as the forth Eparchial Bishop of the Ukrainian Catholic Eparchy of New Westminster. He was consecrated as a bishop by archbishop Lawrence Huculak and co-consecrators: archbishop Borys Gudziak and bishop David Motiuk in the Cathedral of Sts. Volodymyr and Olha in Winnipeg on 8 November 2023.

On 9 July 2026 he was appointed as Metropolitan Archbishop of Archeparchy of Winnipeg, succeeding retired predecessor Lawrence Huculak.

Catholic Church titles
Preceded by David Motiuk (Apostolic Administrator)	Eparchial Bishop of Ukrainian Catholic Eparchy of New Westminster; 2023–2026	Vacant
Preceded by Lawrence Huculak	Metropolitan Archbishop of Ukrainian Catholic Archeparchy of Winnipeg; 2026–	Incumbent
