= Ukrainian Catholic Archeparchy of Winnipeg =

Eastern Catholic archeparchy in Manitoba, Canada

Archeparchy of Winnipeg Archieparchia Vinnipegensis Ucrainorum Українська Католицька Архиєпархія в Вінніпеґу
- Cathedral of Sts. Volodymyr and Olha

Location
- Country: Canada
- Territory: Manitoba
- Ecclesiastical province: Winnipeg
- Headquarters: Winnipeg, Manitoba, Canada
- Population: 29,700

Information
- Denomination: Catholic Church
- Sui iuris church: Ukrainian Greek Catholic Church
- Rite: Byzantine Rite
- Established: November 3, 1956
- Cathedral: Cathedral of Sts. Volodymyr and Olha

Current leadership
- Pope: Leo XIV
- Major Archbishop: Sviatoslav Shevchuk
- Metropolitan Archbishop: Michael Kwiatkowski
- Auxiliary Bishops: Andriy Rabiy
- Bishops emeritus: Lawrence Huculak

Website
- archeparchy.ca

The Archeparchy of Winnipeg is a Ukrainian Greek Catholic Church ecclesiastical territory or archeparchy of the Catholic Church in Manitoba, a province of Canada. Currently, its archeparch is Michael Kwiatkowski.

Its cathedral is the Cathedral of Sts. Volodymyr and Olha in the episcopal see of Winnipeg, Manitoba Sts. Volodymyr and Olha are the patron saints of the Cathedral. In Ukrainian Catholic churches the patron saint of the Church is generally represented behind the altar. Sts. Volodymyr and Olha are the ones who introduced Christianity to Ukraine, and it is appropriate that the first Ukrainian Church in Winnipeg is placed under their patronage. Among the locations under the archeparchy's administration is Bishop Velychkovsky Martyr’s Shrine, also in Winnipeg.

The archeparchy oversees all Ukrainian Greek Catholic parishes in Manitoba. As of 2010, the archeparchy contained 136 parishes, 32 active diocesan priests, 11 religious priests, and 29,700 Ukrainian Greek Catholics. It also has 23 religious sisters, 11 religious brothers and 12 permanent deacons. It operates a number of parochial schools in the city of Winnipeg jointly with the Latin Archdiocese of Saint Boniface.

== History ==
Sts. Vladimir and Olga, by Leo Mol

Nestor Dmytriw, the first Ukrainian Greek Catholic priest in Canada, having started parishes in 1897 and 1898 in Terebowla, Manitoba, Stuartburn, Manitoba and Edna, Alberta, advocated a separate territory for Ukrainian Greek Catholics in Canada, but this idea was opposed by the existing Latin Canadian Catholic hierarchy. His vision came to fruition on 15 June 1912 when the Holy See established in Winnipeg the Apostolic Exarchate of Canada and Nykyta Budka was appointed its first Exarch (missionary bishop) for Ukrainians in Canada, in response to the success of pretend Bishop Seraphim (Stefan Ustvolsky) in organizing Ukrainians interested in the liturgical traditions of their heritage.

On 19 January 1948, it was renamed as Apostolic Exarchate of Central Canada, having lost vast territories to establish the Apostolic Exarchate of Western Canada and the Apostolic Exarchate of Eastern Canada. In 1951, it was again renamed as Apostolic Exarchate of Manitoba, having lost territory again to establish the Apostolic Exarchate of Saskatoon. On 3 November 1956, it finally lost its missionary pre-diocesan and exempt status (until then, it had been immediately subject to the Holy See) when promoted directly to metropolitan status as the Archeparchy of Winnipeg.

== Ecclesiastical province ==
Its ecclesiastical province in Canada includes the metropolitan's archeparchy and the following suffragan eparchies:

- Ukrainian Catholic Eparchy of Edmonton
- Ukrainian Catholic Eparchy of New Westminster
- Ukrainian Catholic Eparchy of Saskatoon
- Ukrainian Catholic Eparchy of Toronto and Eastern Canada.

== Bishops ==
=== Hierarchs ===
Apostolic Exarch of Canada

- Blessed Nykyta Budka (1912.07.15 – 1927), Titular Bishop of Patara

Apostolic Exarch of Central Canada

- Basil Ladyka, O.S.B.M. (1929.05.20 – 1948.01.19), Titular Bishop of Abydus

Apostolic Exarch of Manitoba

- Basil Ladyka, O.S.B.M. (1948.01.19 – 1956.09.01), Titular Bishop of Abydus
- Maxim Hermaniuk C.SS.R. (1956.09.01 – 1956.11.03), Titular Bishop of Sinna

Metropolitan Archeparchs (Archbishops) of Winnipeg

- Maxim Hermaniuk, C.SS.R. (1956.11.03 – 1992.12.16) also President of Synod of the Ukrainian Catholic Church (1969 – 1974)
- Michael Bzdel C.SS.R. (1992.12.16 – 2006.01.09)
- Lawrence Huculak, O.S.B.M. (2006.01.09 – 2026.07.09)
- Michael Kwiatkowski (since 2026.07.09)

=== Coadjutor bishop ===
- Maxim Hermaniuk, C.SS.R. (1955-1956)

=== Auxiliary bishops ===
- Neil Savaryn, O.S.B.M. (1943-1948), appointed Apostolic Exarch of Western Canada (Ukrainian)
- Andrew Roborecki (1948-1951), appointed Apostolic Exarch of Saskatoon (Ukrainian)
- Maxim Hermaniuk, C.SS.R. (1951-1955), appointed Coadjutor here
- Myron Michael Daciuk, O.S.B.M. (1982-1991), appointed Bishop of Edmonton (Ukrainian)
- Stefan Soroka (1996-2000), appointed Archbishop of Philadelphia (Ukrainian), USA
- David Motiuk (2002-2007), appointed Bishop of Edmonton (Ukrainian)
- Andriy Rabiy (2022-)

=== Other priests of this diocese who became bishops ===
- Isidore Borecky, appointed Apostolic Exarch of Eastern Canada (Ukrainian) in 1948
- Roman Danylak, appointed Apostolic Administrator of Toronto (Ukrainian) in 1992

== Sources and external links ==
- Archeparchy of Winnipeg page at catholichierarchy.org retrieved July 14, 2006
- Catholic Schools Commission
- Ukrainian Catholic Archeparchy of Winnipeg
- Holy Spirit Seminary, Ottawa
