= Diocese of Martyropolis =

Episcopal see in Anatolia

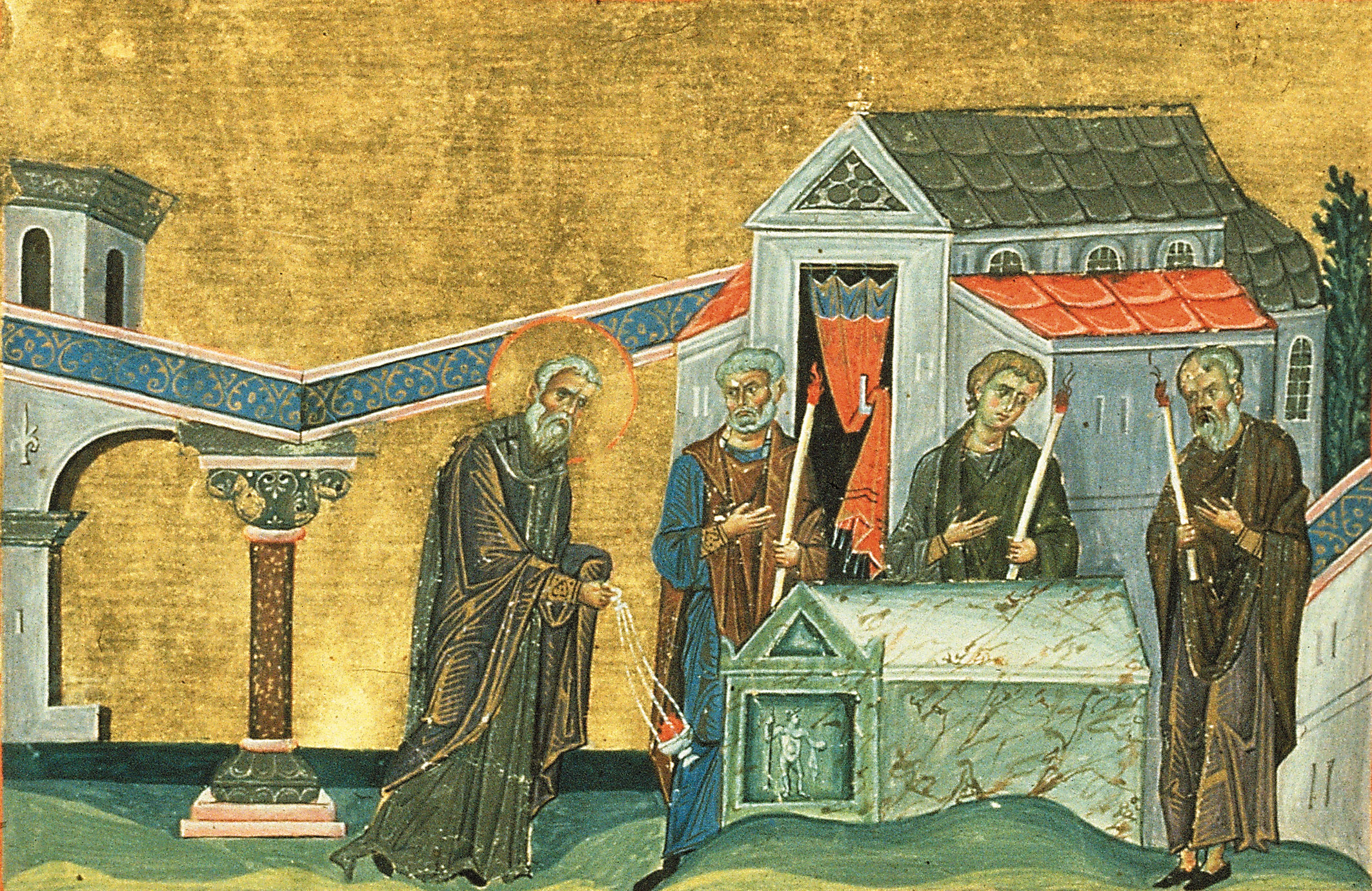
Saint Maruthas, Bishop of Martyropolis in Mesopotamia.

Martyropolis is a historical episcopal see of early Christianity, in what was the Roman province of Mesopotamia, now located in modern Turkey. It is now a titular see of the Catholic Church.

== Historical diocese ==
The diocese was centered on what is now Silvan, Diyarbakır in the province of Mesopotamia.

=== Known bishops ===
- Zennebus,
- Maruthas fl. 383-420.

== Titular sees ==
=== Latin archepiscopal titular see ===
The diocese was nominally restored when a Latin Church titular bishopric was established under the name Martiria, of the lowest (episcopal) rank. Around 1830 it was renamed Martyropolis

In 1932, it was promoted to titular archdiocese, and had three notable incumbents:

Titular archbishops of Martyropolis

- (Chaldean) Yousef VII Ghanima † (29 April 1946 Appointed – 21 June 1948 Confirmed, Patriarch of Babylon of the Chaldeans (Iraq) ([1947.09.17] 1948.06.21 – 1958.07.08)
- Basil Ladyka, * O.S.B.M. † (21 June 1948 Appointed – 1 Sep 1956 Died)
- João Resende (Rezende) Costa, S.D.B. † (19 July 1957 Appointed – 15 Nov 1967 Succeeded, Archbishop of Belo Horizonte, Minas Gerais)

It has been vacant since 1967.

=== Syriac Catholic episcopal titular see ===
A titular see of the Syriac Catholic Church was also established, but suppressed in 1929, without a single recorded incumbent.

== Sources and external links ==
- GigaCatholic Latin titular see
- GigaCatholic Syrian Catholic titular see
