= Holy Eucharist Cathedral (New Westminster) =

- Катедра Пресвятої Евхаристії
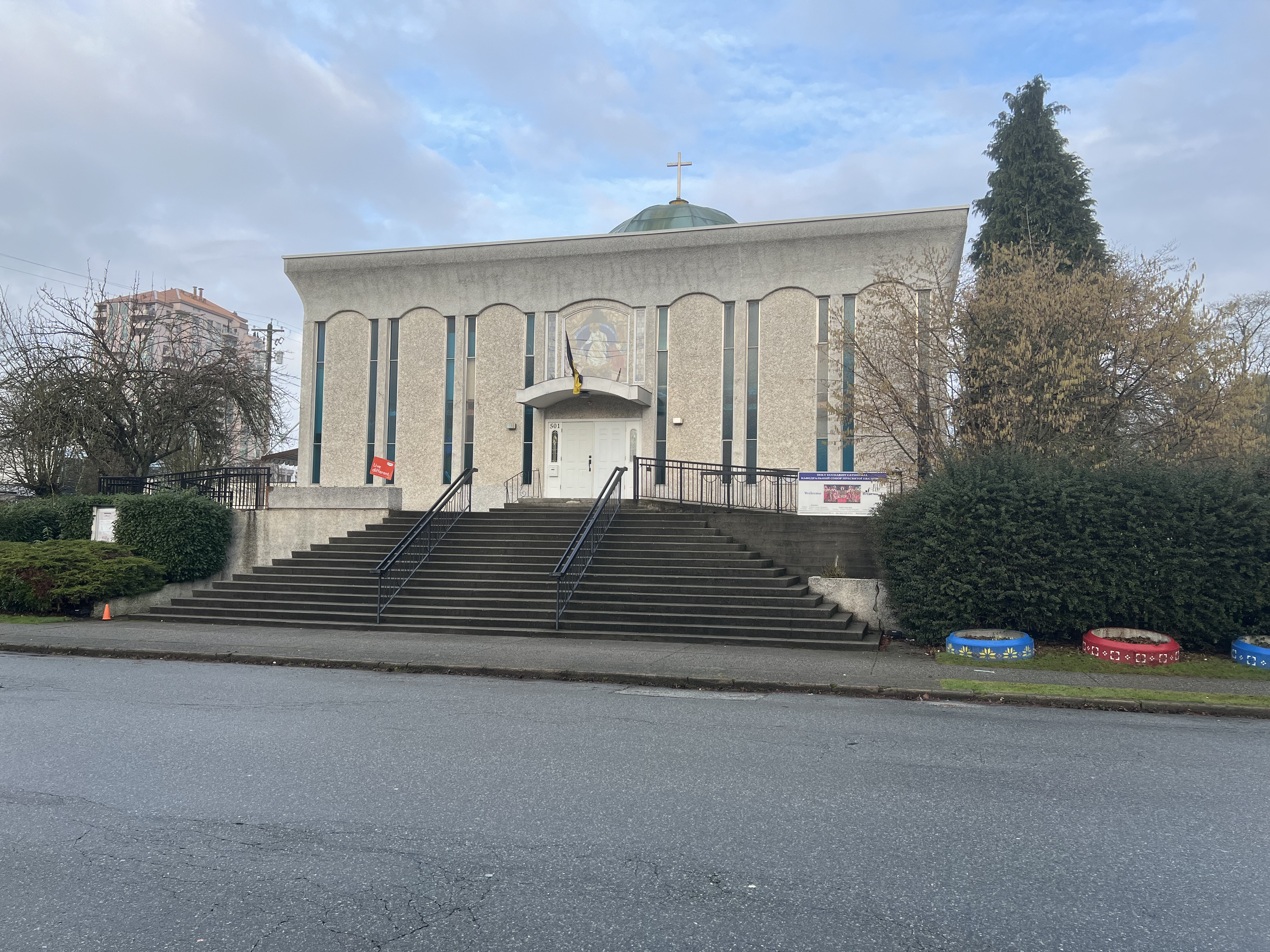
- Cathedral of the Holy Eucharist
- Holy Eucharist Cathedral
- 49°12′39″N 122°54′57″W
- Location: New Westminster, British Columbia
- Country: Canada
- Denomination: Catholic Church (Ukrainian Greek)

Administration
- Diocese: Ukrainian Catholic Eparchy of New Westminster

The Holy Eucharist Cathedral Also Cathedral of the Holy Eucharist (Ukrainian: Катедра Пресвятої Евхаристії) It is the name that receives a religious building affiliated with the Catholic church that is located in New Westminster, a city in the Lower Mainland region of British Columbia, Canada, and a member municipality of Metro Vancouver.

The cathedral is the mother church of the Ukrainian Catholic Eparchy of New Westminster (Latin: Eparchia Neo-Vestmonasteriensis Ucrainorum; Ukrainian: Українська Католицька Єпархія Нью Вестмінстера) which was created in 1974 by the bull "Cum territorii" of Pope Paul VI.

It is one of the 2 Catholic cathedrals in the Vancouver area, the other being that of the Holy Rosary that follows the Roman or Latin Rite of the Catholic Church. In 2018 the cathedral received 2 pieces of Mother Teresa of Calcutta's hair, so the creation of a reliquary was commissioned to protect them

Its current administrator is the Bishop Michael Kwiatkowski.

== See also ==
- List of cathedrals in Canada
