= Basil Filevich =

Canadian Ukrainian Greek Catholic bishop

- Eparchial Bishop of Ukrainian Catholic Eparchy of Saskatoon
- Church: Ukrainian Greek Catholic Church
- Appointed: December 5, 1983
- Term ended: November 6, 1995
- Predecessor: Andrew Roborecki
- Successor: Cornelius Pasichny
- Other post: Rector of Cathedral of St. Josaphat in Toronto (1951–1978)

Orders
- Ordination: April 17, 1942 (Priest) by Basil Ladyka
- Consecration: February 27, 1984 (Bishop) by Maxim Hermaniuk

Personal details
- Born: Basil Filevich; January 13, 1918 Stry, Alberta, Canada
- Died: April 20, 2006 (aged 88) Saskatoon, Canada

Bishop Basil Filevich (Ukrainian: Василь Філевич; January 13, 1918 – April 20, 2006) was a Canadian Ukrainian Greek Catholic hierarch. He served as the second Eparchial Bishop of Ukrainian Catholic Eparchy of Saskatoon from December 5, 1983, until his retirement on November 6, 1995.

== Life ==
Bishop Filevich was born in the family of ethnical Ukrainian Greek-Catholics Omelian and Anna (née Pelakh) Filevich with eight children in Canada. After the school education, he subsequently studied philosophy and theology in the St. Joseph Theological Seminary in Edmonton (1937–1942). Filevich was ordained as a priest on April 17, 1942 after completed theological studies.

After that he had a various pastoral assignments and served as parish priest, chancellor and a Rector of Cathedral of St. Josaphat in Toronto (1951–1978). Five last years before his nomination as bishop, in 1978–1983, he served as a parish priest in Thunder Bay, Ontario.

On December 5, 1983, Fr. Filevich was nominated by Pope John Paul II and on February 27, 1984 consecrated to the Episcopate as the second Eparchial Bishop of Ukrainian Catholic Eparchy of Saskatoon. The principal consecrator was Metropolitan Maxim Hermaniuk.

On November 6, 1995, Bishop Filevich retired and died on April 20, 2006, in the age 88.

== Memory ==
Bishop Filevich Ukrainian Bilingual School in Saskatoon is named after him.

Catholic Church titles
Preceded by Andrew Roborecki	Eparchial Bishop of Saskatoon; 1983–1995	Succeeded by Cornelius Pasichny
