= Michael Bzdel =

Michael Bzdel C.Ss.R.
- Metropolitan Archeparch Emeritus of Winnipeg
- Church: Ukrainian Greek Catholic Church
- Archdiocese: Archeparchy of Winnipeg
- In office: 16 December 1992 – 9 January 2006
- Predecessor: Maxim Hermaniuk
- Successor: Lawrence Huculak

Orders
- Ordination: 7 July 1954 by Andrew Roborecki
- Consecration: 9 March 1993 by Maxim Hermaniuk

Personal details
- Born: July 21, 1930 Wishart, Saskatchewan, Dominion of Canada
- Died: April 3, 2012 (aged 81) Winnipeg, Manitoba, Canada

Michael Bzdel, C.Ss.R. (July 21, 1930 – April 3, 2012) was a Ukrainian Catholic Archbishop, serving as the Metropolitan of the Ukrainian Catholic Archeparchy of Winnipeg, Canada.

Bzdel was born to Ukrainian immigrants in Wishart, Saskatchewan, Canada, on July 21, 1930, the 11th of 14 children in his family. He studied at the Redemptorist-run Saint Vladimir's College in Roblin, Manitoba, Canada, and decided to become a priest.

In 1984 Bzdel was elected Provincial Superior of the Yorkton, Saskatchewan, Canada Province of the Redemptorist Order, a position he held until his elevation to the episcopate in 1992.

As Metropolitan, Archbishop Bzdel was one of the four ex-officio members of the Permanent Council of the Canadian Conference of Catholic Bishops.

In 1997, Pope John Paul II named him a Delegate to the Synod of Bishops for America.

He retired in January 2006, after nearly 13 years as Metropolitan.
