= Julius Jia Zhiguo =

Chinese underground bishop (1935–2025)

- Bishop of Zhengding
- Native name: 贾治国
- Church: Catholic Church
- Diocese: Diocese of Zhengding
- In office: 8 February 1981 – 29 October 2025
- Predecessor: Job Chen Chi-ming
- Successor: Paul Jiang Taoran

Orders
- Ordination: 7 June 1980 by Anthony Chow Wei-tao
- Consecration: 8 February 1981 by Peter Joseph Fan Xueyan

Personal details
- Born: 1 May 1935 Wuqiu (west of Zongshizhuang), Zhili, Republic of China
- Died: 29 October 2025 (aged 90)

Julius Jia Zhiguo (Chinese: 贾治国; 1 May 1935 – 29 October 2025) was an bishop of the Roman Catholic Church in the People's Republic of China.

Jia was first imprisoned in 1963 for refusing to renounce his allegiance to the pope. He never joined the Chinese Catholic Patriotic Association.

Jia was ordained priest on 7 June 1980 and consecrated bishop later that year on 19 December. His ordination, and consecration were conducted by Bishop Peter Joseph Fan Xueyan. He had been jailed 20 years. He had been bishop of the Diocese of Zhengding. During his confinement at home, his requests for medical treatment were denied by Chinese authorities.

In March 2004, the Cardinal Kung Foundation sent out a press release detailing the disappearance of Jia of Hebei province in central China. Newspapers picked up the story and within a week of Kung's press release he was freed.

He was arrested again by local authorities on the morning of 24 August 2008, his twelfth arrest since January 2004.

In 2009, Chinese police re-arrested Jia. The arrest came just as a special Vatican commission met in Rome to consider the situation facing the church in China.

Jia was once again arrested by authorities in 2020.

Jia died on 29 October 2025 at the age of 90.

== See also ==
- Catholic Church in China
- Chinese house church
