= Roman Catholic Diocese of Abydus =

Titular see

Diocese of Abydus is titular see of the Roman Catholic Church.

Abydos (Ancient Greek: Ἄβυδος, Latin: Abydus) was an ancient city in Mysia. It was located at the Nara Burnu promontory on the Asian coast of the Hellespont, opposite the ancient city of Sestos, and near the city of Çanakkale in Turkey. Eastern Orthodox bishopric of Abydos appears in all the Notitiae Episcopatuum of the Patriarchate of Constantinople from the mid-7th century until the time of Andronikos III Palaiologos (1341), first as a suffragan of Cyzicus and then from 1084 as a metropolitan see without suffragans. Abydos remained Eastern Orthodox metropolitan see until the city fell to the Turks in the 14th century.

In 1222, during the Latin occupation, the papal legate Giovanni Colonna united the dioceses of Abydos and Madytos and placed the see under direct Papal authority.

No longer a residential bishopric, Abydus is today listed by the Catholic Church as a titular see, and has had the following incumbents:

== Catholic bishops of Abydus ==
- Michael Mazloum (1816.12.17 – 1817.04.29)
- Guilelmus Zerbi (1818.10.02 – 1825.06.27)
- Giovanni Pietro Losana (1827.01.23 – 1833.09.30)
- Francis George Mostyn ( 1840.09.22 – 1847.08.11)
- Jean-Baptiste Anouilh (1848.04.28 – 1869.02.18)
- Luis Bruschetti (1876.06.26 – 1881.10.27)
- Pietro Caprotti (1882.02.28 – 1886.09.01)
- Julien Vidal (1887.05.13 – 1922.04.02)
- Etienne Irénée Faugier (1922.06.19 – 1928.06.04)
- Basil Ladyka (1929.05.20 – 1948.06.21)
- Launcelot Goody (1951.08.02 – 1954.11.12)
- Julio Benigno Laschi González (1955.03.23 – 1969.05.19)
- Joseph Pallikaparampil (1973.06.16 – 1981.02.06)
- Jacob Manathodath (1992.09.06 – 1996.11.11)
- Michel Abrass (2006.10.17 – 2006.11.11)
