= Isidore Borecky =

- Eparchial Bishop of Ukrainian Catholic Eparchy of Toronto
- Church: Ukrainian Greek Catholic Church
- Appointed: 17 January 1948 (as Apostolic Exarch); 3 November 1956 (as Eparchial Bishop)
- Term ended: 16 June 1998
- Predecessor: New Creation
- Successor: Cornelius Pasichny
- Other posts: Titular Bishop of Amathus (1948–1956), Order of Merit (3rd class)

Orders
- Ordination: 17 July 1938 (Priest) by Dionisije Njaradi
- Consecration: 27 May 1948 (Bishop) by Basil Ladyka

Personal details
- Born: Isydor-Ilyariy Semenovych Boretskyi; 1 October 1911 Ostrivets, Austro-Hungarian Empire (present day Ternopil Oblast, Ukraine)
- Died: 23 July 2003 (aged 91) Toronto, Ontario, Canada

Bishop Isidore Borecky (Ukrainian: Ісидор Ілярій Борецький; 1 October 1911 in Ostrivets, Austro-Hungarian Empire (present day in Ternopil Raion, Ternopil Oblast, Ukraine) – 23 July 2003 in Toronto, Ontario, Canada) was a Ukrainian-born Canadian Ukrainian Greek Catholic hierarch. He served as the Titular Bishop of Amathus (until 3 November 1956) and the first Eparchial Bishop of the new created Ukrainian Catholic Eparchy of Toronto from 17 January 1948 until his retirement on 16 June 1998 (until 10 March 1951 with title of Apostolic Exarch of Eastern Canada; and until 3 November 1956 with title of Apostolic Exarch of Toronto).

== Life ==
Bishop Borecky was born in the Ukrainian peasant family in Halychyna. After the school and gymnasium education, he subsequently studied philosophy and theology in the Greek Catholic Theological Academy in Lviv (1932–1936) and the Ludwig-Maximilians-Universität München (LMU) in Munich, Germany (1936–1938). Borecky was ordained as a priest on July 17, 1938. In the same year he went to Canada for the pastoral work and here he had various pastoral assignments and served as parish priest in the parishes of Apostolic Exarchate of Canada.

On January 17, 1948, Fr. Borecky was nominated by Pope Pius XII and on May 27, 1948 consecrated to the Episcopate as the Titular Bishop of Amathus and Apostolic Exarch of Apostolic Exarchate of Eastern Canada. The principal consecrator was Archbishop Basil Ladyka.

Bishop Borecky was a one among co-founders of the Ukrainian Catholic Association "Sviata Sofia". He retired on June 16, 1998, and died on July 23, 2003, in the age 91.

Catholic Church titles
Preceded by Patrick Cleary	Titular Bishop of Amathus; 1948–1956	Succeeded by Garabed Amadouni
New title	Eparchial Bishop of Toronto (until 1956 as Apostolic Exarch); 1948–1998	Succeeded by Cornelius Pasichny
