= Ostrivets, Ternopil Oblast =

Rural locality in Ternopil Oblast, Ukraine

Ostrivets Острівець
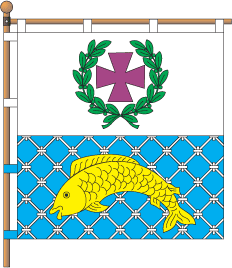
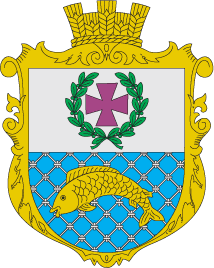
- Flag Coat of arms

- Location in Ternopil Oblast
- Coordinates: 49°17′26″N 25°37′45″E
- Country: Ukraine
- Oblast: Ternopil Oblast
- Raion: Ternopil Raion
- Hromada: Terebovlia urban hromada
- Time zone: UTC+2 (EET)
  - Summer (DST): UTC+3 (EEST)
- Postal code: 48107

Ostrivets (Ukrainian: Острівець) is a village in Terebovlia urban hromada, Ternopil Raion, Ternopil Oblast, Ukraine.

== History ==
The first written mention of the village was in 1410.

After the liquidation of the Terebovlia Raion on 19 July 2020, the village became part of the Ternopil Raion.

== Religion ==
- Saint Demetrius church (1840, OCU),
- Saint Demetrius chapel (1997, UGCC),
- Church (19th century, RCC).

== Notable residents ==
- Isidore Borecky (1911–2003), Ukrainian-born Canadian Ukrainian Greek Catholic hierarch

== Sources ==
- (in Ukrainian) Заяць Н., Острівець // Ternopil Encyclopedic Dictionary: in 4 v. / editorial board: H. Yavorskyi and other, Ternopil: "Zbruch", 2005, V. 2: К—О, S. 696. — ISBN 966-528-199-2.
- "Ostrowczyk". Geographical Dictionary of the Kingdom of Poland (in Polish). 7. Warszawa: Kasa im. Józefa Mianowskiego. 1886. p. 714.
