= Jean-Baptiste Anouilh =

19th-century French Catholic missionary in China

Most Reverend Jean-Baptiste Anouilh
- Vicar Apostolic of Southwestern Chi-Li
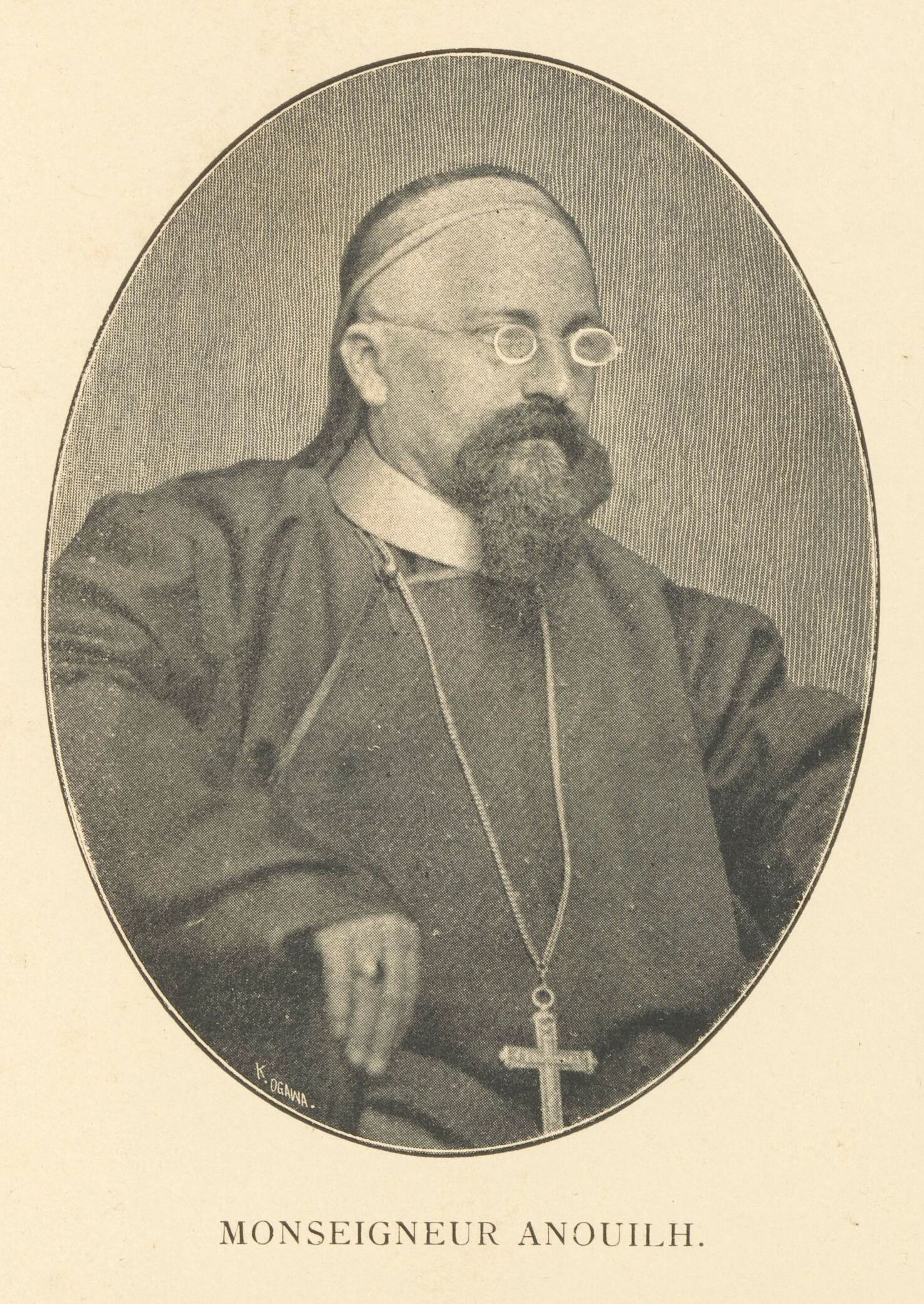
- Church: Catholic Church
- In office: 1858–1869
- Predecessor: None
- Successor: François-Ferdinand Tagliabue
- Previous post: Titular Bishop of Abydus (1848–1858)

Orders
- Ordination: Oct 1847
- Consecration: 22 Jun 1851 by Joseph-Martial Mouly

Personal details
- Born: 8 Nov 1819 Prat-Bonrepaux, France
- Died: 18 Feb 1869 (age 49)

Jean-Baptiste Anouilh, C.M. (Chinese: 董若翰) (1819–1869) was a Catholic prelate who served as the first Vicar Apostolic of Southwestern Chi-Li (1858–1869), Coadjutor Vicar Apostolic of Peking (1848–1858), and Titular Bishop of Abydus (1848–1858).

== Biography ==
Jean-Baptiste Anouilh was born in Prat-Bonrepaux, France and ordained a priest in the Congregation of the Mission on Oct 1847. On 28 Mar 1848, he was appointed during the papacy of Pope Pius IX as Titular Bishop of Abydus and Coadjutor Vicar Apostolic of Peking. On 22 Jun 1851, he was consecrated bishop by Joseph-Martial Mouly, Titular Bishop of Fussala. On 14 Dec 1858, he was appointed during the papacy of Pope Pius IX as Vicar Apostolic of Southwestern Chi-Li. He served as Vicar Apostolic of Southwestern Chi-Li until his death on 18 Feb 1869.

Catholic Church titles
Preceded by Francis George Mostyn	Titular Bishop of Abydus; 1848–1858	Succeeded by Luis Bruschetti
Preceded by	Coadjutor Vicar Apostolic of Peking; 1848–1858	Succeeded by
Preceded by None	Vicar Apostolic of Southwestern Chi-Li; 1858–1869	Succeeded by François-Ferdinand Tagliabue
