= Andrew Roborecki =

- Eparchial Bishop of Ukrainian Catholic Eparchy of Saskatoon
- Church: Ukrainian Greek Catholic Church
- Appointed: 10 March 1951 (as Apostolic Exarch); 3 November 1956 (as Eparchial Bishop)
- Term ended: 24 October 1982
- Predecessor: New Creation
- Successor: Basil Filevich
- Other posts: Titular Bishop of Tanais (1948–1956), Auxiliary Bishop of Apostolic Exarchate of Central Canada (1948–1951)

Orders
- Ordination: 18 July 1934 (Priest) by Basil Ladyka
- Consecration: 27 May 1948 (Bishop) by Basil Ladyka

Personal details
- Born: Andriy Yakovych Roboretskyi; 12 December 1910 Velyki Mosty, Austro-Hungarian Empire (present day Lviv Oblast, Ukraine)
- Died: 24 October 1982 (aged 71) Toronto, Ontario, Canada

Bishop Andrew J. Roborecki (Ukrainian: Андрій Роборецький; 12 December 1910 in Velyki Mosty, Austro-Hungarian Empire (present day in Chervonohrad Raion, Lviv Oblast, Ukraine) – 24 October 1982 in Toronto, Ontario, Canada) was a Ukrainian-born Canadian Ukrainian Greek Catholic hierarch. He served as the Titular Bishop of Tanais and Auxiliary Bishop of Apostolic Exarchate of Central Canada from 14 February 1948 until 10 March 1951 and as the first Eparchial Bishop of Ukrainian Catholic Eparchy of Saskatoon from 10 March 1951 until his death on 24 October 1982 (until 3 November 1956 with title of Apostolic Exarch of Saskatoon).

== Life ==
Bishop Roborecki was born in the family of Yakiv and Anastasiya Roboretskyi in Halychyna, but in 1913 with family moved to Canada, where he grew up. After the school education, he studied philosophy and theology and was ordained as a priest on July 18, 1934.

After that he had a various pastoral assignments and served as parish priest in the parishes of Apostolic Exarchate of Canada.

On February 14, 1948, Fr. Roborecki was nominated by Pope Pius XII and on May 27, 1948 consecrated to the Episcopate as the Titular Bishop of Tanais and Auxiliary Bishop of Apostolic Exarchate of Central Canada. The principal consecrator was Archbishop Basil Ladyka.

Bishop Roborecki died on October 24, 1982, in the age 71, while participated in a one conference in Toronto.

Catholic Church titles
| Preceded by Joseph Tsui Shou-hsün | Titular Bishop of Tanais; 1948–1956 | Succeeded by Raúl Francisco Primatesta |
| New title | Eparchial Bishop of Saskatoon (until 1956 as Apostolic Exarch); 1951–1982 | Succeeded by Basil Filevich |
