= Ukrainian Catholic Eparchy of Saskatoon =

Ukrainian Catholic ecclesiastical jurisdiction in Canada

Coordinates: 52°07′N 106°39′W

Eparchy of Saskatoon Eparchia Saskatoonensis Ucrainorum Українська Католицька Єпархія Саскатуну
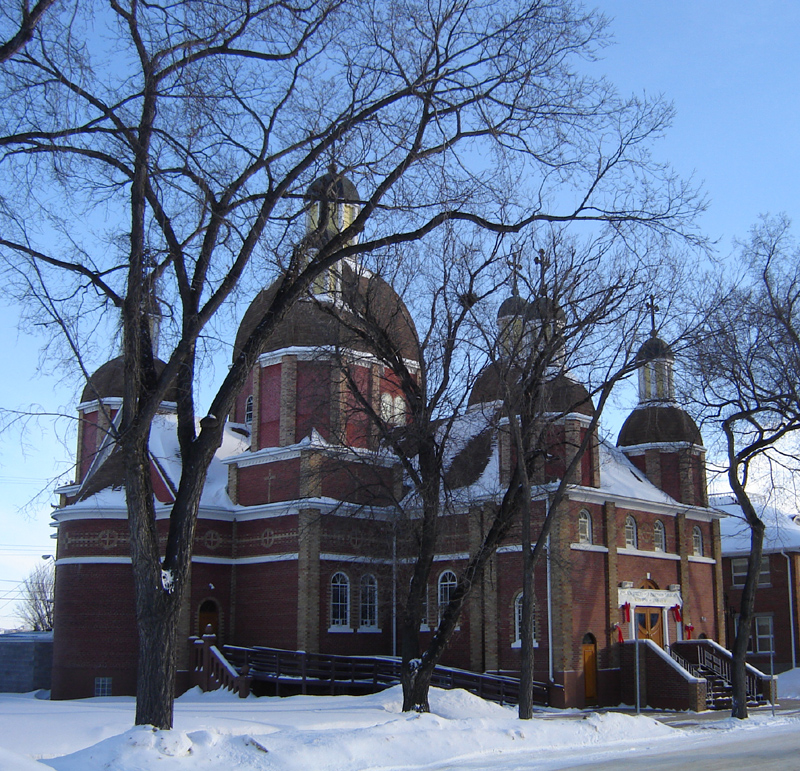
- Cathedral of St. George (Saskatoon)

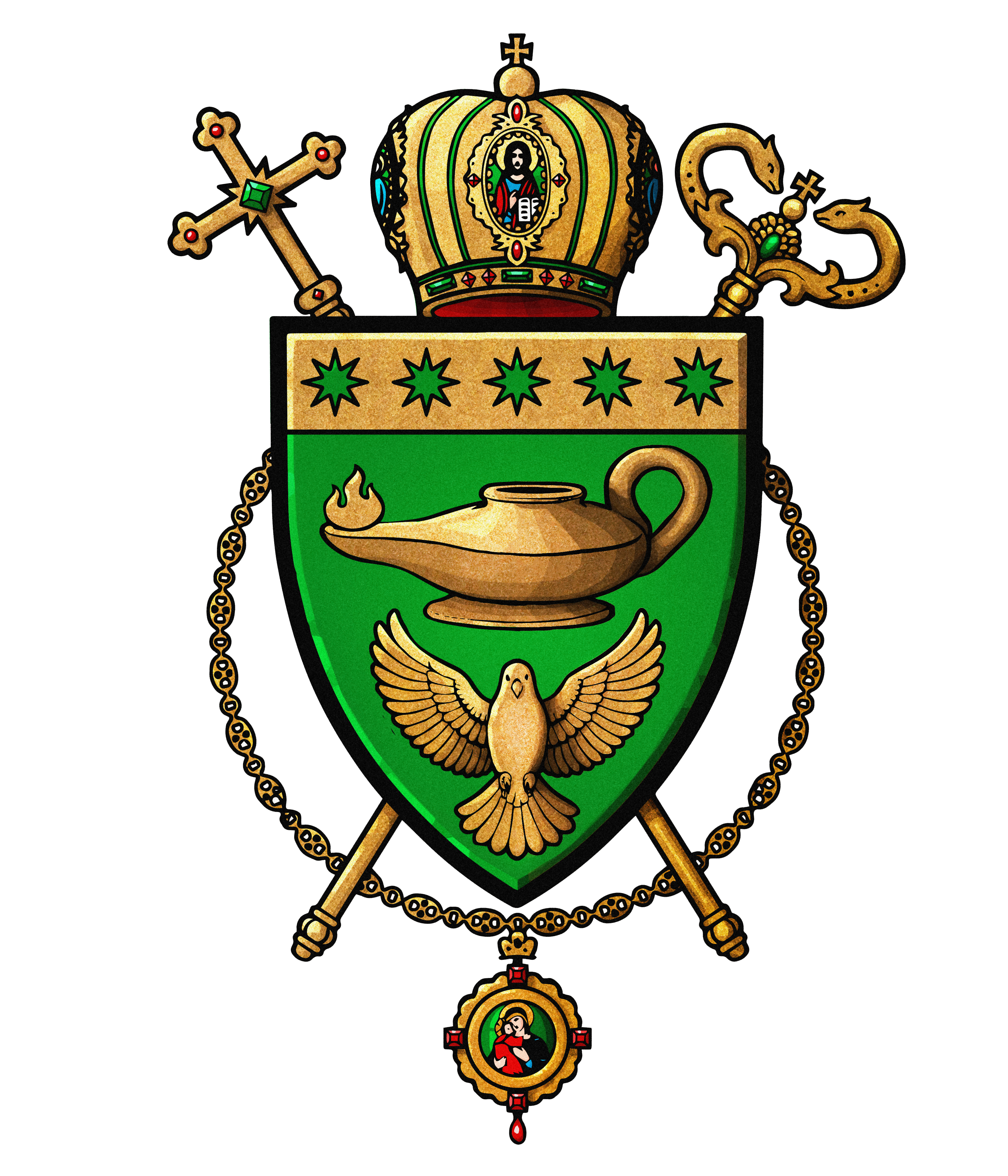
- Eparchy of Saskatoon Coat of Arms

Location
- Country: Canada
- Territory: Saskatchewan, Canada
- Ecclesiastical province: Archeparchy of Winnipeg
- Headquarters: Saskatoon, Saskatchewan, Canada
- Population: 5,438

Information
- Denomination: Catholic Church
- Sui iuris church: Ukrainian Greek Catholic Church
- Rite: Byzantine Rite
- Established: November 3, 1956
- Cathedral: Cathedral of St. George

Current leadership
- Pope: Leo XIV
- Major Archbishop: Sviatoslav Shevchuk
- Bishop: Michael Smolinski, C.Ss.R.
- Metropolitan Archbishop: Michael Kwiatkowski Archbishop of Winnipeg
- Bishops emeritus: Michael Wiwchar, C.Ss.R.

Website
- Ukrainian Catholic Eparchy of Saskatoon

The Eparchy of Saskatoon (Ukrainian: Саскатунська єпархія Української греко-католицької церкви) is a Ukrainian Greek Catholic Church ecclesiastical territory or eparchy of the Catholic Church in the Canadian province of Saskatchewan.

The eparchy's cathedral is the Cathedral of St. George in the episcopal see of Saskatoon. The eparchy is a suffragan in the ecclesiastical province of the metropolitan Ukrainian Catholic Archeparchy of Winnipeg.

== History ==
- Established on March 10, 1951, as Apostolic Exarchate of Saskatoon, on territory split off from the then Apostolic Exarchate of Central Canada.
- November 3, 1956: Elevated to Eparchy of Saskatoon

== Bishops ==
=== Episcopal ordinaries ===
Apostolic Exarch of Saskatoon

- Andrew Roborecki (1951.03.10 – 1956.11.03 see below), Titular Bishop of Tanais (1948.03.03 – 1956.11.03)

Suffragan Eparchs (Bishops) of Saskatoon

- Andrew Roborecki (see above 1956.11.03 – death 1982.10.24)
- Basil Filevich (1983.12.05 – 1995.11.06)
- Cornelius Pasichny, O.S.B.M. (1995.11.06 – 1998.07.01)
- Michael Wiwchar, C.Ss.R. (2000.11.29 – 2008.05.02)
- Bryan Bayda, C.Ss.R. (2008.05.02 – 2022.04.28)
- Lawrence Huculak, O.S.B.M., Apostolic Administrator (2022–2024)
- Michael Smolinski, C.Ss.R. (since 2024.01.21)

=== Other priests of this eparchy who became bishops ===
- Kenneth Nowakowski, appointed Bishop of New Westminster (Ukrainian) in 2007

== Statistics ==
As of 2020, the Eparchy contains 67 parishes, 23 active eparchial and religious priests and 5,438 Catholics. It also has 16 women religious, 7 religious priests and 3 permanent deacons.

== Coat of Arms ==
In 2025, the Eparchy of Saskatoon adopted a new coat of arms.

The new arms of the Eparchy of Saskatoon are rich in Christian meaning and rooted in the local character of the province.

Colours of Gold and Green

The shield is divided in the colours of gold and green: gold reminds us of Christ Himself, the incorruptible and priceless foundation of our faith. green is the colour of spring, life, and new beginnings. Together these colours express hope and confidence in God’s cultivating. They are also the colours of the province, which ties this particular heraldic achievement to place.

The Stars and the Lamp

At the top of the shield are five eight-pointed stars. Eight is a sacred number, rich in symbolism, recalling the eight saved in the Ark (1 Peter 3.20), and the eight Beatitudes found in Matthew’s Gospel (5.3–10), but chiefly the Resurrection and a number of perfect completion and fulfilment. Five have been chosen because this number is also rich with meaning: the Pentateuch, and the five wounds of Christ among them. More particularly, the five stars in this heraldic achievement recall the five wise virgins of the Gospel who kept their lamps ready to meet the Bridegroom (Matthew 25). This is made all-the-more obvious with the burning oil lamp placed beneath them. The lamp is a reminder that the Eparchy must be a light set on a stand, not hidden (Mark 4.21), and that all Christians are called to keep their lamps burning in readiness for the Lord (Luke 12.35). The lamp’s flame symbolizes Christ, the true light who shines in the darkness, and whom the darkness cannot overcome (John 1.5). The flame has three peaks pointing to the Holy Trinity.

The Dove

The lower part of the shield bears a dove, a symbol of the Holy Spirit who inspires, protects, and guides the Eparchy, the Church and all Christians. The dove is shown in an uplifting style, reflecting hope and the Spirit’s life-giving presence in our communities.

This heraldic design proclaims that the Eparchy of Saskatoon, standing at a crossroads, chooses the way of life, hope, and faith in Christ who is the light of the world. It’s a pictorial representation of our prayer to God that we remain a faithful people, ready to proclaim the Gospel in our part of the Lord’s pasture under the guidance and protection of the Holy Spirit.

== Sources and external links ==
- Ukrainian Catholic Eparchy of Saskatoon
- GigaCatholic, with incumbent biography links
- Saint George's Cathedral, Saskatoon
- Saints Peter & Paul Ukrainian Catholic Church, Saskatoon
- Sheptytsky Institute, Saskatoon
- St. Mary's Ukrainian Catholic Church, Yorkton
- Ukrainian Catholic Redemptorists of the Yorkton Province
- Ukrainian Catholic Education Center, Saskatoon
- Holy Spirit Seminary, Ottawa
