= Ukrainian Catholic Eparchy of New Westminster =

Ukrainian Catholic ecclesiastical jurisdiction in Canada

Coordinates: 49°12′N 122°54′W

Eparchy of New Westminster Eparchia Neo-Vestmonasteriensis Ucrainorum Українська Католицька Єпархія Нью Вестмінстера
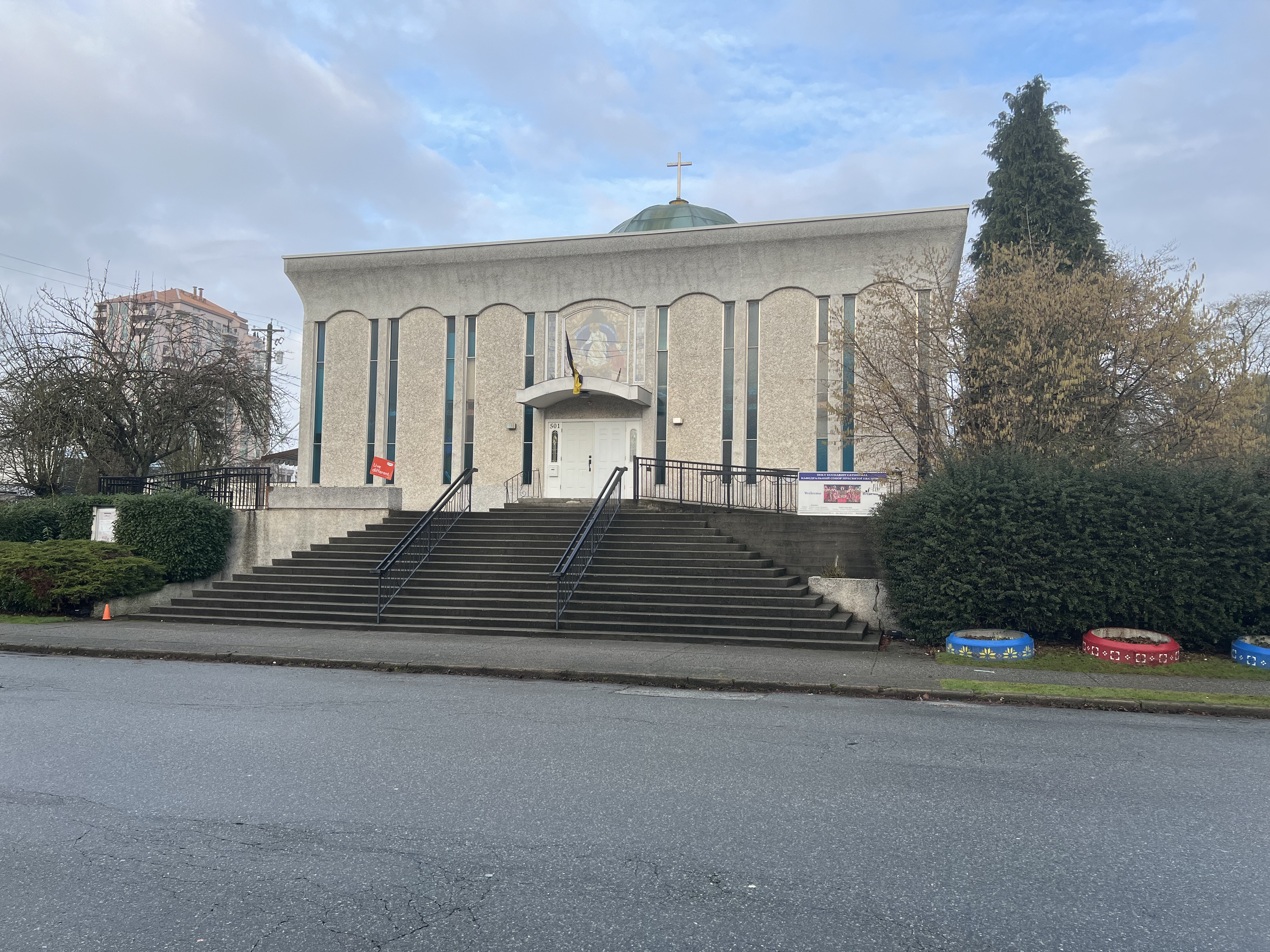
- Holy Eucharist Cathedral

Location
- Territory: British Columbia, Canada
- Ecclesiastical province: Archeparchy of Winnipeg
- Headquarters: New Westminster, B.C., Canada
- Population: 7,800

Information
- Denomination: Catholic Church
- Sui iuris church: Ukrainian Greek Catholic Church
- Rite: Byzantine Rite
- Established: June 27, 1974
- Cathedral: Holy Eucharist Cathedral

Current leadership
- Pope: Leo XIV
- Major Archbishop: Sviatoslav Shevchuk
- Eparch: Vacant
- Metropolitan Archbishop: Michael Kwiatkowski

Website
- www.nweparchy.ca

The Eparchy of New Westminster is a Ukrainian Greek Catholic Church ecclesiastical territory or eparchy of the Catholic Church in the Canadian province of British Columbia. The eparchy is a suffragan in the ecclesiastical province of the metropolitan Archeparchy of Winnipeg.

As of 2004, the diocese contained 7,800 Catholics with 17 parishes, 11 active diocesan priests and 2 religious priests as well as 2 women religious, 2 religious brothers, and 2 permanent deacons. On 16 January 2020, bishop David Motiuk was appointed an Apostolic Administrator of the Eparchy of New Westminster.

== Eparchial bishops ==
The following is a list of the bishops and archbishops and their terms of service:

- Jeronim Chimy (1974–1992)
- Severian Yakymyshyn (1995–2007)
- Kenneth Nowakowski (2007–2020)
- David Motiuk, Apostolic Administrator (2020–2023)
- Michael Kwiatkowski (2023–2026)
