= Diocese of Zhengding =

Roman Catholic diocese in China

Coordinates: 38°08′N 114°34′E

Diocese of Zhengding Dioecesis Cemtimensis 天主教正定教区

Location
- Country: China
- Ecclesiastical province: Beijing
- Metropolitan: Beijing

Statistics
- Population: Total; Catholics: (as of 1948); 4,000,000; 52,000 (1.3%)

Information
- Rite: Latin Rite
- Cathedral: Cathedral Immaculate Conception in Shijiazhuang

Current leadership
- Pope: Leo XIV
- Bishop: Sede vacante
- Metropolitan Archbishop: Joseph Li Shan

The Roman Catholic Diocese of Zhengding/Chengting (Latin: Cemtimen(sis), Chinese: 正定) is a diocese located in the city of Zhengding in the ecclesiastical province of Beijing in China.

== History ==
- April 2, 1856: Established as Apostolic Vicariate of Southwestern Chi-Li 直隸西南 from the Diocese of Beijing 北京
- December 3, 1924: Renamed as Apostolic Vicariate of Zhengdingfu 正定府
- April 11, 1946: Promoted as Diocese of Zhengding 正定

== Special churches ==
- Former Cathedral:
  - 正定主教座堂

== Leadership ==
- Vicars Apostolic of Southwestern Chi-Li 直隸西南 (Roman Rite)
  - Bishop Jean-Baptiste Anouilh, C.M. (董若翰) (December 14, 1858 – February 18, 1869)
  - Bishop François-Ferdinand Tagliabue, C.M. (戴世濟 / 戴濟世) (June 22, 1869 – August 5, 1884)
  - Bishop Jean-Baptiste-Hippolyte Sarthou, C.M. (郁世良 / 都士良) (January 16, 1885 – June 6, 1890)
  - Bishop Jules Bruguière, C.M. (包儒略) (July 28, 1891 – October 19, 1906)
  - Bishop Jules-Auguste Coqset, C.M. (順其衡) (May 3, 1907 – February 4, 1917)
  - Bishop Jean de Vienne de Hautefeuille, C.M. (文貴斌) (February 4, 1917 – April 2, 1919)
- Vicars Apostolic of Zhengdingfu 正定府 (Roman Rite)
  - Bishop Franciscus Hubertus Schraven, C.M. (文致和) (December 16, 1920 – October 10, 1937)
  - Bishop Giobbe Chen Chi-ming, C.M. (陳啓明) (January 5, 1939 – April 11, 1946)
- Bishops of Zhengding (Roman rite)
  - Bishop Giobbe Chen Chi-ming, C.M. (陳啓明) (April 11, 1946 – June 10, 1959)
  - Bishop Julius Jia Zhiguo (1981 – October 29, 2025)
