= Neil Savaryn =

Neil Savaryn, O.S.B.M.
- Eparchial Bishop of Ukrainian Catholic Eparchy of Edmonton
- Church: Ukrainian Greek Catholic Church
- Appointed: 19 January 1948 (as Apostolic Exarch); 3 November 1956 (as Eparchial Bishop)
- Term ended: 8 January 1986
- Predecessor: New Creation
- Successor: Demetrius Greschuk
- Other posts: Titular Bishop of Ios (1943–1956), Auxiliary Bishop of Apostolic Exarchate of Canada (1943–1948)

Orders
- Ordination: 23 August 1931 (Priest) by Bl. Josaphat Kotsylovsky
- Consecration: 1 July 1943 (Bishop) by Basil Ladyka, James Charles McGuigan, Ambrose Senyshyn

Personal details
- Born: Mykola Vasylyovych Savaryn; 19 May 1905 Staryi Sambir, Austro-Hungarian Empire (present day Lviv Oblast, Ukraine)
- Died: January 8, 1986 (aged 80) Edmonton, Canada

Neil Nicholas Savaryn, O.S.B.M. (Ukrainian: Ніл Микола Саварин; 19 May 1905 in Staryi Sambir, Austro-Hungarian Empire (present-day Lviv Oblast, Ukraine) – 8 January 1986 in Edmonton, Canada) was a Ukrainian-born Canadian Ukrainian Greek Catholic hierarch. He served as the titular bishop of Ios and auxiliary bishop of Apostolic Exarchate of Canada from 3 April 1943 until 19 January 1948 and as the first eparchial bishop of Ukrainian Catholic Eparchy of Edmonton from 19 January 1948 until his death on 8 January 1986 (until 10 March 1951 with title of Apostolic Exarch of Western Canada and until 3 November 1956 with title of Apostolic Exarch of Edmonton).

== Life ==
Savaryn was born in the family of Vasyl and Anna (née Syherych) Savaryn in Halychyna. After the school and gymnasium education, he subsequently joined the Order of Saint Basil the Great on August 28, 1922, where he made a profession on July 3, 1924, and a solemn profession on September 14, 1930. Savaryn was ordained as a priest on August 23, 1931, after completed philosophical and theological studies in the Basilian Theological Seminary.

In 1932 he arrived to Canada as Hegumen of the monastery in Mundare and professor at the Basilian Institutes in Canada.

On April 3, 1943, Savaryn was nominated by Pope Pius XII and on July 1, 1943 consecrated to the Episcopate as the titular bishop of Ios and auxiliary bishop of Apostolic Exarchate of Canada. The principal consecrator was Archbishop Basil Ladyka.

Savaryn founded eparchial museum and library and died on January 8, 1986, at the age 80.

Catholic Church titles
New title	Titular Bishop of Ios; 1943–1956	Succeeded by James Cunningham
New title	Eparchial Bishop of Edmonton (until 1956 as Apostolic Exarch); 1948–1986	Succeeded by Demetrius Greschuk
