= Ukrainian Pontifical College of Saint Josaphat =

Ukrainian Pontifical College in Rome

Coordinates: 41.8953°N 12.4607°E

The Ukrainian Pontifical College of Saint Josaphat is a Pontifical College in Rome, for seminarians and priests of the Ukrainian Greek Catholic Church. Its patron saint is Josaphat Kuntsevych. It also includes the church of San Giosafat al Gianicolo, one of Ukraine's national churches in Rome.

== History ==
The origins of the Ukrainian College date back to the 16th century and were at first closely linked with the Greek Pontifical College of Saint Athanasius, which was founded in 1576. That college was not only attended by Greek and Greek-speaking seminarians but also by Ukrainians until 1897, except for the period between 1803 and 1845, when the Greek College was closed.

On 18 December 1897 Pope Leo XIII approved the foundation of a separate Ukrainian college and in 1904 the Basilian Order of St Josaphat/Order of Saint Basil the Great (who also had the General Curia in Rome, Italy) transferred into the college. It was first sited on Piazza Madonna dei Monti, but on 13 November 1932 a new building was opened for it on the Janiculum Hill. It now has between 20 and 50 students and its rector is Father Genesio Viomar OSBM.

== Alumni ==
- Joseph Michael Schmondiuk (1912–1978), Ukrainian-Catholic Bishop of Philadelphia, Pennsylvania, USA.
- Augustine Eugene Hornyak OSBM (1919–2003), Serbian-born Ukrainian Exarch of Great Britain
- Sofron Stefan Mudry OSBM (1923–2014) rector (1974–1994), Bishop of Ivano-Frankivsk, Ukraine
- Kenneth Nowakowski (born 1958), Bishop of New Westminster, British Columbia, Canada.
