= Cornelius Pasichny =

Ukrainian Catholic prelate in Canada

Cornelius Pasichny OSBM
- Suffragan Eparch of Toronto
- Church: Catholic Church
- Diocese: Ukrainian Catholic Eparchy of Toronto and Eastern Canada
- In office: 1 July 1998 – 3 May 2003
- Predecessor: Isidore Borecky
- Successor: Stephen Chmilar
- Previous post: Suffragan Eparch of Saskatoon (1995-1998)

Orders
- Ordination: 5 July 1953 by Ivan Buchko
- Consecration: 17 January 1996 by Michael Bzdel

Personal details
- Born: Cornelius John Pasichny; 27 March 1927 Winnipeg, Manitoba, Canada
- Died: 30 January 2014 (aged 86) Toronto, Ontario, Canada

Cornelius John Pasichny OSBM (27 March 1927 in Winnipeg – 30 January 2014 in Toronto) was the Eparch of the Ukrainian Catholic Eparchy of Saskatoon (1995–1998) and of the Ukrainian Catholic Eparchy of Toronto and Eastern Canada (1998–2003) in Canada.

== Early life ==
At age 15 he joined the Order of St Basil the Great, and after novitiate studied philosophy and theology in Canada and then at the Pontifical Gregorian University in Rome.

== Priesthood ==
Pasichny was ordained as a priest by Bishop Ivan Bucko on 5 July 1953. He continued his studies by obtaining a Licenciate in Philosophy from the Gregorian University the following year.

In November 1995 he was nominated as bishop of the Ukrainian Greek Catholic Church.
