= Bryan Bayda =

21st-century Canadian bishop of the Ukrainian Greek Catholic Church

Most Reverend Bryan Bayda C.Ss.R.
- Bishop of Toronto and Eastern Canada
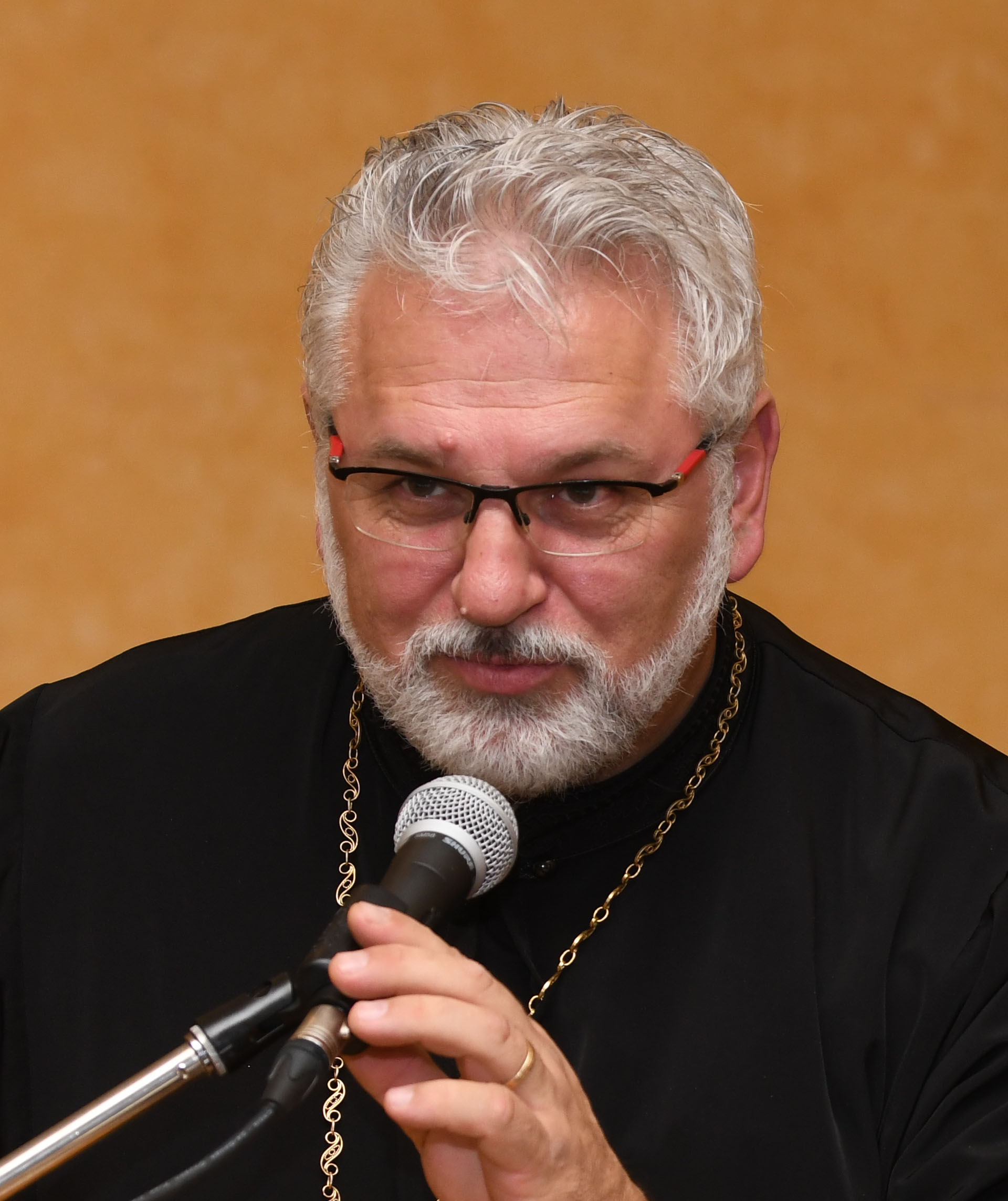
- Native name: Bryan Bayda
- Church: Ukrainian Greek Catholic Church
- Diocese: Toronto and Eastern Canada

Orders
- Ordination: May 30, 1987 by Bishop Basil Filevich
- Consecration: June 27, 2008 by Lawrence Huculak, O.S.B.M.

Personal details
- Born: Bryan Joseph Bayda; August 21, 1961 (age 65) Saskatoon, Saskatchewan, Canada
- Coat of arms

Bryan Joseph Bayda CSsR (born August 21, 1961 in Saskatoon, Saskatchewan) is the bishop of the Eparchy of Toronto and Eastern Canada in the Ukrainian Greek Catholic Church.

Bayda was born in Saskatoon on August 21, 1961. Upon completing high school at St. Vladimir's College Minor Seminary in Roblin, Manitoba, he pursued studies at the University of St. Michael's College in Toronto, where he obtained a Bachelor of Arts in philosophy in 1982 and a Master of Divinity in 1987. Further studies included a Bachelor of Education from the University of Manitoba in 1990 and a Diploma in Eastern Christian theology from the Sheptytsky Institute in Ottawa in 1997.

Pope Benedict XVI appointed Bayda as the Eparch of Saskatoon on May 2, 2008. He was appointed Apostolic Administrator of the Eparchy of Toronto and Eastern Canada on November 9, 2019 by Pope Francis. On April 28, 2022, Pope Francis appointed him as bishop of the same eparchy.
