= David Motiuk =

Canadian bishop

Most Reverend David Motiuk
- Ukrainian Catholic Eparchy of Edmonton
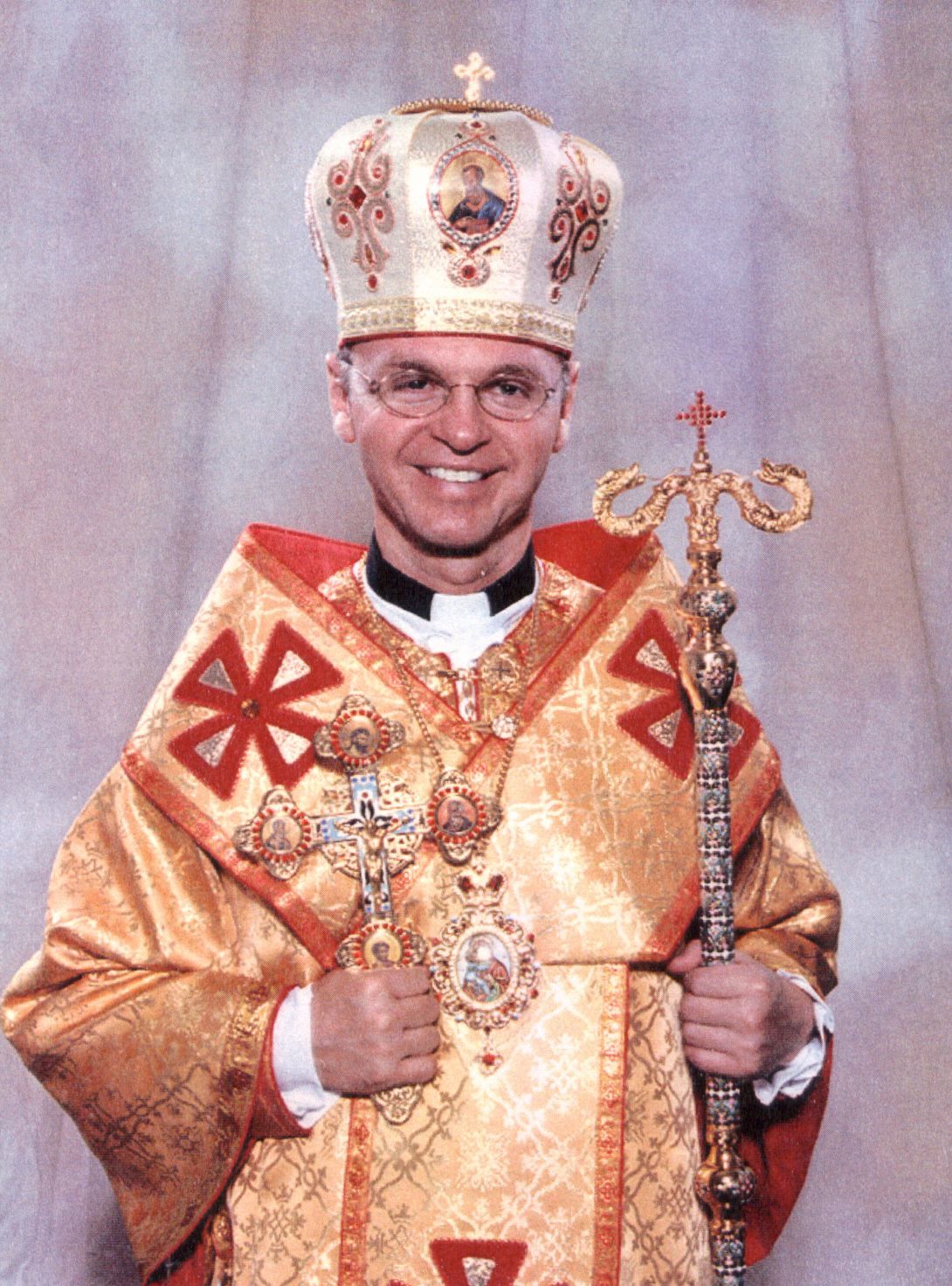
- Church: Ukrainian Greek Catholic Church
- In office: January 24, 2007
- Predecessor: Lawrence Huculak, O.S.B.M.

Orders
- Ordination: August 21, 1988 by Bishop Demetrius Martin Greschuk
- Consecration: June 11, 2002 by Cardinal Lubomyr Husar, M.S.U.

Personal details
- Born: David Motiuk; January 13, 1962 (age 64) Vegreville, Alberta, Canada

David Motiuk (born January 13, 1962, in Vegreville, Alberta) is the bishop of the Ukrainian Catholic Eparchy of Edmonton. He was ordained a priest on 21 August 1988 and was ordained a bishop in Winnipeg on 11 June 2002. He was appointed Eparchial Bishop of Edmonton on 25 January 2007 and installed on 24 March 2007. On January 16, 2020, he was appointed an Apostolic Administrator of the Eparchy of New Westminster. He holds a doctorate in Eastern Catholic canon law from the Pontifical Oriental Institute in Rome.

== Scholarly work ==
In October 2014, David presented "An Overview of the Ukrainian Catholic Church on the Eve of the Second Vatican Council" at the conference "The Vatican II Decree on the Eastern Catholic Churches, Orientalium ecclesiarum - Fifty Years Later" organized by the Metropolitan Andrey Sheptytsky Institute of Eastern Christian Studies held at the University of Toronto.

Catholic Church titles
Preceded by Lawrence Huculak	Bishop of the Ukrainian Catholic Eparchy of Edmonton; 2007–present	Incumbent
