= Lawrence Huculak =

Most Reverend Lawrence Huculak OSBM
- Metropolitan Archbishop of Winnipeg
- Church: Ukrainian Greek Catholic Church
- Appointed: January 6, 2006
- Term ended: July 9, 2026
- Predecessor: Michael Bzdel
- Successor: Michael Kwiatkowski
- Other posts: Apostolic Administrator of Saskatoon (2022-2024), Bishop of Edmonton (1997–2006)

Orders
- Ordination: August 28, 1977 (priest)
- Consecration: April 3, 1997 by Michael Bzdel

Personal details
- Born: Daniel Huculak; January 25, 1951 (age 75) Vernon, British Columbia, Canada
- Coat of arms

Styles of Lawrence Huculak
- Reference style: His Grace; The Most Reverend
- Spoken style: His Grace
- Religious style: Metropolitan

Lawrence Daniel Huculak OSBM (born January 25, 1951) is a Canadian Ukrainian Catholic hierarch who served as a Metropolitan of the Ukrainian Catholic Archeparchy of Winnipeg from 2006 until 2026. Previously he served as an Eparchial Bishop of Edmonton since 1997 until 2006.

== Biography ==
In 1969 Huculak entered the Order of St. Basil the Great in Mundare, Alberta. He earned a Bachelor of Arts with a concentration in philosophy from the University of Ottawa in 1974, and then studied at the Pontifical Athenaeum of Saint Anselm.

He was ordained a priest on August 28, 1977, and was ordained as the Eparchial Bishop of Edmonton on 3 April 1997.

He was appointed Metropolitan of Winnipeg on 9 January 2006 and installed on 11 February 2006. He holds a doctorate in eastern liturgy from the Pontifical Oriental Institute in Rome.

As of 2024 he has been a priest for 47 years, and 27 years as a bishop. In 2019 he became the second longest-serving metropolitan archbishop of Winnipeg, after Metropolitan Maxim Hermaniuk, who served for 36 years.

On April 28, 2022, he was named Apostolic Administrator of the Eparchy of Saskatoon.

On July 9, 2026, he retired as Metropolitan Archbishop of Winnipeg because of the age limit and was succeeded by Michael Kwiatkowski.
