= Saint Vladimir's College =

Former Ukrainian Catholic minor seminary

Coordinates: 51.2281°N 101.3524°W

Saint Vladimir's
- Type: Seminary
- Established: 1936
- Affiliations: Ukrainian Catholic
- Location: Roblin, Manitoba, Canada

Saint Vladimir's is a former Ukrainian Catholic minor seminary in Roblin, Manitoba.

== History ==
The origins of St. Vladimir's College is closely tied to the history of the Ukrainian Greek Catholic Church in Canada. In the early 1900s, Roman Catholic Redemptorist missionaries from Belgium were sent to Canada in order to serve the growing population of Ukrainian immigrants in the prairie provinces. Settling in Yorkton, Saskatchewan, in 1904, they opened a monastery and church within ten years.

By 1917, they had seen the need to train young Canadian men for service in the church and they accepted their first two students as minor seminarians.

By 1936, after years of uncertainty, the minor seminary re-opened with the intent of educating young men in the Byzantine Rite. As this was the Rite of the majority of the Ukrainian immigrants, the institution was most welcomed and highly successful. The Ukrainian priests and their operation of the Yorkton Minor Seminary were instrumental in keeping alive the faith of the Ukrainian immigrants on the Canadian prairies and an essential factor in the growth of the Ukrainian Greek Catholic Church in Canada.

It closed in 2002.

== See also ==
- St. Volodymyr Museum
- St. Volodymyr's Ukrainian Orthodox Cathedral (Toronto)
