= Basil Ladyka =

Archbishop Basil Ladyka, O.S.B.M.
- Apostolic Exarch of Apostolic Exarchate of Manitoba
- Church: Ukrainian Greek Catholic Church
- Appointed: 20 May 1929
- Term ended: 1 September 1956
- Predecessor: Blessed Nykyta Budka
- Successor: Maxim Hermaniuk
- Other posts: Titular Bishop of Abydos (1929–1948), Titular Archbishop of Martyropolis (1948–1956)

Orders
- Ordination: 4 August 1912 (Priest) by Soter Ortynsky
- Consecration: 14 July 1929 (Bishop) by Constantine Bohachevsky

Personal details
- Born: Volodymyr Vasylyovych Ladyka; 2 August 1884 Drohobych, Austro-Hungarian Empire (present day Lviv Oblast, Ukraine)
- Died: 1 September 1956 (aged 72) Winnipeg, Manitoba, Canada

Archbishop Basil Volodymyr Ladyka, O.S.B.M. (Ukrainian: Василь Володимир Ладика; 2 August 1884 in Drohobych, Austro-Hungarian Empire (present day Lviv Oblast, Ukraine) – 1 September 1956 in Winnipeg, Canada) was a Ukrainian-born Canadian Ukrainian Greek Catholic hierarch. He served as the Head of the Ukrainian Greek-Catholic Church in Canada from 20 May 1929 until his death on 1 September 1956. He had the next titles: Apostolic Exarch of Canada from 20 May 1929 until 19 January 1948, Apostolic Exarch of Central Canada from 19 January 1948 until 10 March 1951; and Apostolic Exarch of Manitoba from 10 March 1951 until 1 September 1956.

== Life ==
Archbishop Ladyka was born in the family of Vasyl and Kateryna (née Plyauschak) Ladyka in Halychyna. After the school and gymnasium education, he subsequently joined the Order of Saint Basil the Great in 1903, where he made a profession on April 2, 1905, and a solemn profession on August 28, 1909. Ladyka was ordained as a priest on August 4, 1912, after completed philosophical and theological studies in Montreal, Quebec, Canada, where he lived in the Basilian community from 1909.

After his ordination Fr. Ladyka worked as a missionary in Canada and from 1922 until 1929 served as Hegumen of the monastery in Edmonton.

On May 20, 1929, Fr. Ladyka was nominated by Pope Pius XI and on July 14, 1929 consecrated to the Episcopate as the Titular Bishop of Abydos and the second Apostolic Exarch of Canada. The principal consecrator was Bishop Constantine Bohachevsky.

On June 21, 1948, he was elevated in rank of archbishop with title of the Titular See of Martyropolis. Archbishop Ladyka was a founder of the different Ukrainian associations in Canada and died on September 1, 1956, in the age 72.

Catholic Church titles
Preceded by Etienne Irénée Faugier	Titular Bishop of Abydos; 1929–1948	Succeeded by Launcelot Goody
Preceded by Yousef Ghanima	Titular Archbishop of Martyropolis; 1948–1956	Succeeded by João Resende Costa
Preceded by Blessed Nykyta Budka	Apostolic Exarch of Manitoba (until 1948 as Ap. Exarch of Canada; until 1951 as Ap. Exarch of Central Canada); 1929–1956	Succeeded by Maxim Hermaniuk
