= Maxim Hermaniuk =

Maxim Hermaniuk OC CSsR
- Metropolitan Archeparch of Winnipeg
- Native name: Макси́м Германю́к
- Archdiocese: Archeparchy of Winnipeg
- In office: 1 September 1956 – 16 December 1992
- Predecessor: Basil Ladyka
- Successor: Michael Bzdel
- Previous posts: Apostolic Administrator of Exarchate of Manitoba (1956); Coadjutor Bishop of Manitoba (1955-1956); Titular Bishop of Sinna (1951-1956); Auxiliary Bishop of Manitoba (1951-1955)

Orders
- Ordination: 4 September 1938 by Nicholas Charnetsky
- Consecration: 29 June 1951 by Basil Ladyka

Personal details
- Born: 30 October 1911 Nove Selo, Kingdom of Galicia and Lodomeria, Cisleithania, Austria-Hungary
- Died: 3 May 1996 (aged 84) Winnipeg, Manitoba, Canada

Maxim Hermaniuk OC CSsR (30 October 1911 – 3 May 1996) was the Ukrainian Catholic Archbishop of Winnipeg.

Born in Nove Selo near Horodok in western Ukraine, he was ordained a Priest of Congregation of the Most Holy Redeemer in 1938. In 1956, he was appointed Ukrainian Catholic Archbishop of Winnipeg by Pope Pius XII. He retired in 1992.

In 1982, he was made an Officer of the Order of Canada.
