= Meron Mazur =

Brazilian bishop (born 1962)

Meron Mazur, O.S.B.M.
- Eparchial Bishop of Ukrainian Catholic Eparchy of Imaculada Conceição in Prudentópolis
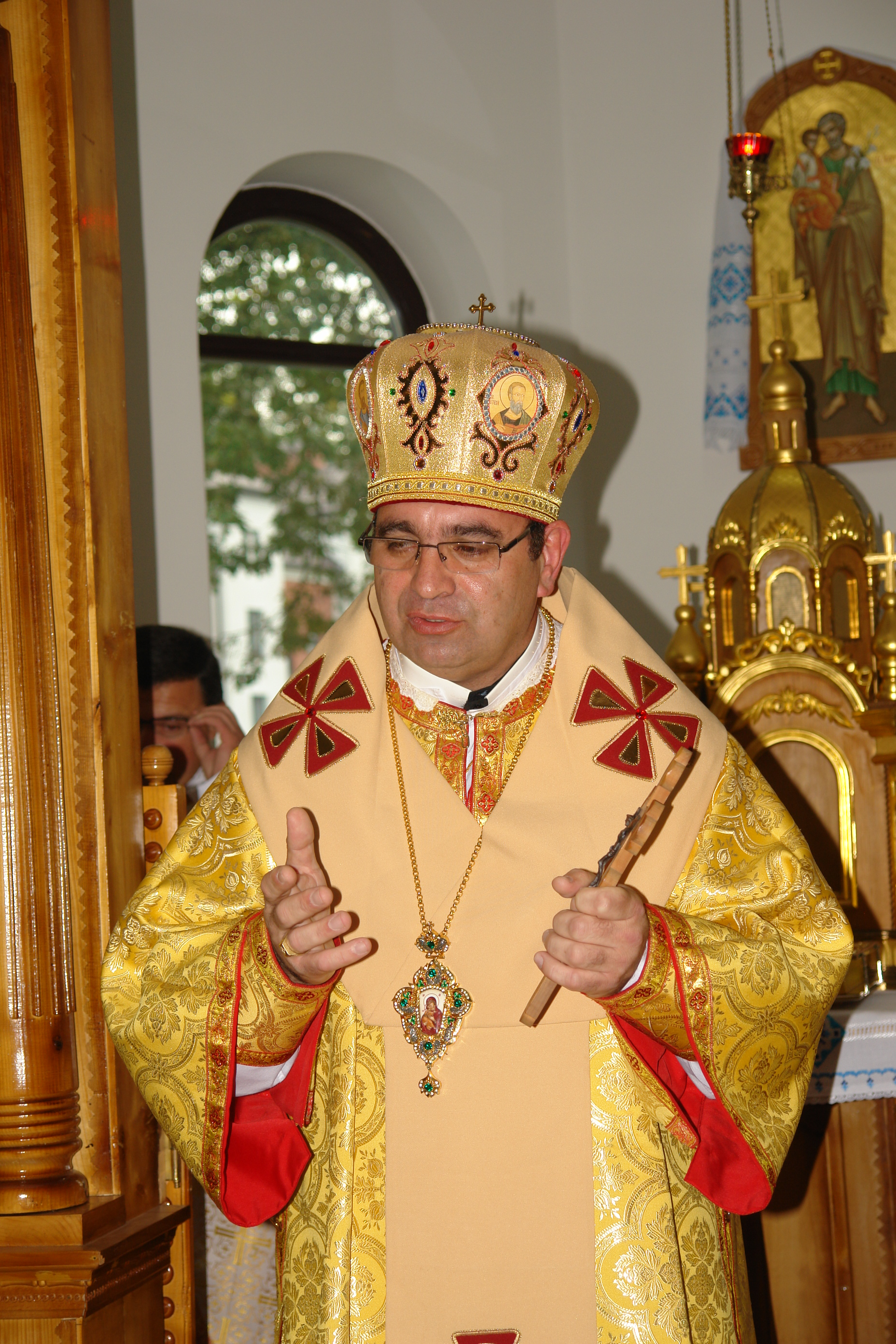
- Church: Ukrainian Greek Catholic Church
- Appointed: 12 May 2014
- Predecessor: new title
- Other posts: Auxiliary Bishop of São João Batista em Curitiba (2005–2014); Titular Bishop of Simitthu (2005–2014)

Orders
- Ordination: 8 Sep 1990 (Priest) by Efraím Basílio Krevey
- Consecration: 26 Feb 2006 (Bishop) by Lubomyr Husar

Personal details
- Born: Meron Mazur; 5 February 1962 (age 64) Prudentópolis, Paraná, Brazil
- Coat of arms

Bishop Meron Mazur, O.S.B.M. (Ukrainian: Мирон Мазур; born 5 February 1962 in Prudentópolis, Paraná, Brazil) is a Brazilian Ukrainian Greek Catholic hierarch. He is currently the eparchial bishop of the Ukrainian Catholic Eparchy of Imaculada Conceição in Prudentópolis, an office that he has held since 12 May 2014. From 12 December 2005 until his assumption of his present position, he was the titular bishop of Simitthu and the auxiliary bishop of the São João Batista em Curitiba.

== Life ==
Bishop Mazur was born into a family of ethnically Ukrainian Greek Catholics in Brazil. After attending a minor Basilian seminary, he joined the Order of Saint Basil the Great, where he had a profession on February 10, 1981 and a solemn profession on January 1, 1988. Mazur was ordained as a priest on September 8, 1990, after studies at the St. Basil's Seminary-Studium in Curitiba. He continued his studies in Italy in the Pontifical Atheneum of St. Anselm, graduating with a baccalaureate in Sacred Theology and with a licentiate in Educational Sciences from the Salesian Pontifical University.

After returning from Italy, he had various pastoral assignments and served as a professor, a superior and a rector at the Basilian Institutes in Brazil. During 2004-2005 he was a Protohegumen (Provincial Superior) of the Basilians in Brazil

On December 21, 2005 Fr. Mazur was nominated by Pope Benedict XVI and on February 26, 2006 consecrated to the Episcopate as an auxiliary bishop. The principal consecrator was Cardinal Lubomyr Husar, the Head of the Ukrainian Greek Catholic Church.

Catholic Church titles
New title	Bishop of Imaculada Conceição in Prudentópolis since 2014	Succeeded by Incumbent
