= José Romão Martenetz =

José Romão Martenetz O.S.B.M.
- Eparch of São João Batista em Curitiba
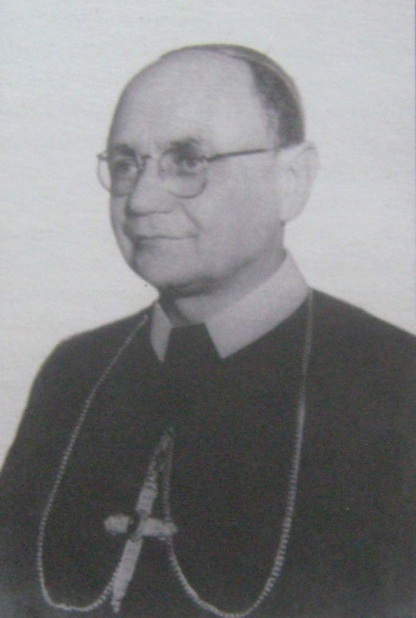
- Native name: Йосиф Роман Мартинець
- Church: Ukrainian Greek Catholic Church
- Diocese: Eparchy of São João Batista em Curitiba
- In office: 30 May 1962 – 10 March 1978
- Predecessor: Exarchate erected
- Successor: Efraím Basílio Krevey
- Previous posts: Titular Bishop of Soldaia (1958-1971); Auxiliary Bishop of the Ordinariate for the Faithful of Eastern Rites in Brazil (1958-1962)

Orders
- Ordination: 1 January 1928 by Isaias Papadopoulos
- Consecration: 15 August 1958 by Ambrose Senyshyn

Personal details
- Born: 7 February 1903 Lemberg, Kingdom of Galicia and Lodomeria, Cisleithania, Austria-Hungary
- Died: 23 February 1989 (aged 86) Curitiba, Paraná, Brazil

José Romão Martenetz (born Roman Martynets; Ukrainian: Йосиф (Роман) Мартинець) (7 February 1903, Lviv, present Ukraine – 23 February 1989, Curitiba, Brazil) was a bishop of the Ukrainian Catholic Eparchy of São João Batista em Curitiba (1962–1978) and a monk of the Order of Saint Basil the Great.

== Biography ==
Romão (Roman) Martenetz was born in Lviv, Ukraine and his parents were Joseph and Adelia (née Doskoch) Martenetz. In 1912 he and his parents migrated to Prudentopolis, Brazil. After the closure of the Latin Seminary in Curitiba in 1922 he went to Carpathian Ruthenia in Ukraine where he completed his philosophical studies. In 1923 in Mukachevo he entered the novitiate of the Order of Saint Basil the Great or Basilian monks (O.S.B.M.) and accepted the name Joseph. In 1924 he took his first vows.

In 1925 Martenetz was studying in the Pontifical Gregorian University where he gained a doctortorate in dogmatic theology. In 1927 in Rome he took his final monastic vows and received his ordination from Bishop Isaias Papadopoulos. On return to Transcarpathia, he was Director of Studies at Maliy Berezny and prefect of students in the Minor Seminary of Basilian fathers in Uzhorod. He also worked in the editorship of the magazine "Evangelist", carried out various pastoral work, and was adviser to the Province and editor of "The Missionary".

In 1935 Martenetz returned to Brazil and took Brazilian citizenship. In the same year he began editing the magazine "Work" (1935–1940) and was a teacher at Saint Joseph Minor Seminary. With a view to the education and training of young people, he founded the organization "Self" and published the magazine "Samoosvitnyk". He also taught theology to students in the Basilian seminary. After the death of Father Marcion Shkirpana O.S.B.M. in 1939 he was elected to the Provincial Government of the Province of the Basilian Fathers in Brazil.

In 1953 Martenetz returned to Rome where he served the governing Proto-Archimandrite of the Basilian Order and was rector of the Ukrainian Pontifical College of Saint Josaphat on Janiculum (1953–1955). He was a member of the Biblical Commission which translated the whole Bible into Ukrainian.

On 10 May 1958 Pope Pius XII appointed him as Assistant Bishop to Cardinal Jaime de Barros Câmara, Archbishop of Rio de Janeiro who also was the ordinary of all Catholics of Oriental Rites in Brazil, and his episcopal ordination took place in Rome on 15 August 1958 in Rome in the Church of Saints Sergius and Bacchus. Chief Bishop was Bishop Ambrose Senyshyn O.S.B.M., future metropolitan of the Ukrainian Catholic Archeparchy of Philadelphia.

On May 30, 1962 Pope John XXIII founded the Apostolic Exarchate of Brazil with its exarch (archbishop) directly responsible to the pope. Martenetz held the position as Exarch of Brazil until 1971. Then on 29 November of that year Pope Paul VI created the Eparchy (diocese) of São João Batista em Curitiba based in Curitiba with Martenetz as its first eparch (bishop) and Hieromonk Efraím Basílio Krevey O.S.B.M. as Coadjutor Bishop. Martenetz was enthroned on 29 July 291972 in São João Batista Cathedral, Curitiba.

On 10 May 1978, Martenetz, already weak and sick, gave his resignation to Pope Paul VI and the episcopacy of Curitiba was transferred to Bishop Krevey. Martenetz then went to live in the seminary of Basilian Fathers in Curitiba, where he was confessor of students and also taught Ukrainian language and literature. In October 1981 he suffered a stroke which resulted in partial loss of speech for over seven years until his death on 23 February 1989. He was buried in the crypt of the Cathedral of Saint John the Baptist, Curitiba.
