= Efraím Basílio Krevey =

Brazilian bishop (1928–2012)

Efraím Basílio Krevey O.S.B.M.
- Eparch of São João Batista em Curitiba
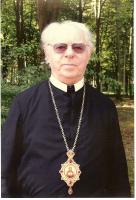
- Church: Ukrainian Greek Catholic Church
- Diocese: Eparchy of São João Batista em Curitiba
- In office: 10 March 1978 – 13 December 2006
- Predecessor: José Romão Martenetz
- Successor: Valdomiro Koubetch
- Previous posts: Titular Bishop of Caffa (1971-1978); Coadjutor Bishop of São João Batista em Curitiba (1971-1978)

Orders
- Ordination: 12 November 1951 by Ivan Buchko
- Consecration: 13 February 1972 by Pope Paul VI

Personal details
- Born: 12 December 1928 Ivaí, Paraná, Brazil
- Died: 3 April 2012 (aged 83) Curitiba, Paraná, Brazil

Efraim Basilio Krevey, O.S.B.M. (12 December 1928 in Saltinho colony, Ivaí, Paraná, Brazil – 3 April 2012 in Curitiba, Brazil) was the Ukrainian Greek Catholic bishop of the Ukrainian Catholic Eparchy of São João Batista em Curitiba, Brazil.

Ordained to the priesthood in 1951, Krevey became a bishop in 1971 retiring in 2006.

== Childhood and joining the monastery schools ==
Efraím Krevey finished primary school in his native Saltino. In 1940 he entered the Minor Seminary of Saint Joseph (Basilian Fathers) in Prudentópolis (Paraná). In January 1943, he entered the novitiate of the Basilian Fathers in Prudentopolis. In 1945, Krevey moved to Irasemu, where he received humanitarian and philosophical education. At the end of 1948 began, his theological studies at the Gregorian University in Rome and received a bachelor's degree and a licentiate.

On 1 January 1950 Krevey amounted his perpetual vows in Rome in the Church of Saints Sergius and Bacchus. Efraím Krevey was ordained on 4 March 1951 at the College of Saint Josaphat martyr at Rome. He was ordained a Deacon 25 March 1951 in Rome, and priest on 12 November 1951 in the Church of Saints Sergius and Bacchus in Rome.

== Pastoral and teaching ==
From August 1952 to 1955, Krevey was assistant at Saint Josaphat martyr church in Prudentopolis and Vice-Rector and Professor of Minor Seminary of Saint Joseph. From 1955 to 1959, he was Rector and Professor of the same Minor Seminary. From 1959 to 1969, Krevey was abbot of the monastery and the parish of Saint Josaphat martyr in Prudentopolis. In 1961, was Master novitiate of the Sisters Servants of the Catechists and the Heart of Jesus. In 1965, was elected Brazilian consultor of Province of Saint Joseph. In 1969 Krevey took part in the General Chapter of Basilian Fathers in Rome. In the same year, was appointed abbot of the monastery of Basilian Fathers studio in Curitiba, and in 1970 he was elected Provincial Superior Province of Saint Joseph the Basilian Fathers in Brazil.

== Bishop ==
On 29 November 1971 he was nominated bishop coadjutor Bishop of the Ukrainian Catholic Eparchy of São João Batista em Curitiba with right of succession. On 13 February 1972 Pope Paul VI in Saint Peter's Basilica in Rome gave him episcopal consecration. In March, returned to Brazil and begins his pastoral ministry with Bishop José Romão Martenetz. In May 1978, due to the fact that Bishop Joseph resigned, Martenetz taking over leadership of the diocese.

During his administration the Diocese of Curitiba made a significant contribution to the consolidation of local Ukrainians. Due to the strong influence of the church, especially the Ukrainian Greek Catholic Church in Brazil, bishops and priests tried to maintain a religion spirit among Ukrainian community encouraged them to learn Ukrainian, preserve national traditions, customs and folklore.

During his Episcopal service Bishop Efraím opened two diocesan seminaries, diocesan home for the elderly, 156 new Greek Catholic churches and a large number of homes for parish activities. He also took an active part in all UGCC Synod in Italy and Ukraine.

On his initiative and support Ukrainian clubs having "12 November" arose in Prudentópolis and "Poltava" of Curitiba (the latter founded in 1980, brings together Catholic youth of Ukrainian origin, a dance group, Bandurist, chorus, orchestra of folk instruments and Saturday School). He founded Ukrainian folk group "Rainbow" in Prudentópolis.

Bishop Efraím Krevey supported the establishment of a large number of NGOs ethnic Ukrainian Brazil, for example, the Ukrainian -Brazilian Central representation (founded in 1985, is a non-profit NGO that coordinates all ethnic Ukrainian association), the Association of Ukrainian-Brazilian Youth (founded in 1972, it coordinates the activities of Ukrainian Brazilian youth organizations) and others.

On 13 December 2006 Pope Benedict XVI accepted the renunciation of Bishop Krevey of his duties as eparch of Curitiba. His successor on the throne became bishop of the Diocese of Curitiba, Vladimir Koubetch, OSBM.

He died on 3 April 2012 in Curitiba and was buried in the crypt of the Cathedral of Saint John the Baptist.

== Awards ==
- Order of Merit (Ukraine) III degree.
- Honorary citizen of the State of Paraná.
- Honorary Citizen mm. Curitiba, Iwai, Prudentópolis, Mallet, Union da Vitoria, Pitanha, Rebousas, Frontinus, Apukarana, Antonio Olinto, Cruz Machado and Irati.
- Award of the Cabinet of Ministers of Ukraine.
