= Valdomiro Koubetch =

Valdomiro Koubetch, O.S.B.M.
- Archbishop-Metropolitan of Ukrainian Catholic Archeparchy of São João Batista em Curitiba
- Church: Ukrainian Greek Catholic Church
- Appointed: 13 December 2006 (as Eparchial Bishop); 12 May 2014 (as Metropolitan)
- Predecessor: Efraím Basílio Krevey
- Other post(s): Coadjutor Bishop of São João Batista em Curitiba (2004–2006)

Orders
- Ordination: 6 Dec 1981 (Priest) by Efraím Basílio Krevey
- Consecration: 21 Mar 2004 (Bishop) by Lubomyr Husar

Personal details
- Born: Valdomiro Koubetch; 27 March 1953 (age 72); Mandaguaçu, Paraná, Brazil

Valdomiro Koubetch, O.S.B.M. (born 27 March 1953, Mandaguaçu, Paraná, Brazil) is the Archbishop-Metropolitan of the Ukrainian Catholic Archeparchy of São João Batista em Curitiba.

In May 2014, the Eparchy became an Archeparchy (Ukrainian-rite metropolitan archdiocese) with its own ecclesiastical province, with one newly erected Eparchy as its Suffragan See, and so Koubetch became its first Archeparch (Archbishop).

== Childhood, joining the monastery, the priesthood ==
Bishop Vladimir Koubetch born on 27 March 1953 in Mandaguaçu village, Paraná state, Brazil. During 1966-1970 he studied at the minor Basilian fathers seminary in Prudentópolis. On 28 January 1971 Koubetch entered the novitiate of the Basilian Fathers in Ivaí. On 11 February 1973 he made his first temporary vows. From 1976 to 1978 Koubetch studied philosophy at the Basilian training center in Curitiba (Batel). On 16 August 1978 Koubetch made perpetual vows in the Basilian Order. From 1978 to 1981 he studied theology at the Pontifical University of Saint Anselm in Rome. On 12 April 1981 in Rome, he was ordained a deacon (by Archbishop Miroslav Marusin, and on 6 December 1981 Koubetch received ordination by bishop Efraím Basílio Krevey.

== Pastoral and educational work ==
In 1982-1983 Koubetch was vicar of the Ivai parish. From 1983 to 1988 he was vicar of the parish in Prudentopolis and teacher and spiritual guide in the minor seminary in Prudentopolis. From 1989 to 1990 teacher in the diocesan seminary, from 1990 to 1991 pastor in São Paulo, from 1991 to 1996 Koubetch was diocesan Apostleship of Prayer leader, teacher in the diocesan seminary, and since 1992 head of the Basilian training center in Curitiba. In 1993 he received his licentiate in moral theology at the University of São Paulo and was professor of theology at the Catholic Theological Institute in Curitiba. From 1996 to 2000 he was vicar of the parish of Ponta Grossa, consultor in provincial constituencies of Basilian fathers. In 2000 Koubetch take care of pastoral parishes in Antonio Olinto, Campina, Santos Andrade, Miko Magro and São João and received a doctorate in moral theology at the Pontifical University of Rio de Janeiro.

== Bishop ==
On 10 December 2003 Pope John Paul II appointed him coadjutor bishop of the Ukrainian Catholic Eparchy of São João Batista em Curitiba in Brazil. On 21 March 2004 in the Cathedral of Saint John the Baptist in Curitiba his episcopal ordination took place. His consecrator was Cardinal Lubomyr Husar, then head of the Ukrainian Greek Catholic Church. On 13 December 2006 Pope Benedict XVI accepted the Efraím Krevey's renunciation of the Ukrainian Greek Eparchy of Curitiba UGCC and in accordance with the law, became its bishop. His enthronement on the throne of the Diocese of Curitiba was held on 7 February 2007 at the Cathedral of Saint John Baptist in Curitiba.
