= Ukrainian Catholic Eparchy of Imaculada Conceição in Prudentópolis =

Ukrainian Greek Catholic eparchy in Brazil

Coordinates: 25.4667°S 49.2500°W

Eparchy of Imaculada Conceição in Prudentópolis Єпархія Непорочного зачаття Діви Марії в Прудентополісі

Location
- Country: Brazil
- Territory: Brazil
- Ecclesiastical province: Archeparchy of São João Batista em Curitiba
- Headquarters: Prudentópolis, Paraná, Brazil

Information
- Sui iuris church: Ukrainian Greek Catholic
- Rite: Byzantine
- Established: May 12, 2014
- Cathedral: St. Josaphat Cathedral in Prudentópolis

Current leadership
- Pope: Leo XIV
- Major Archbishop: Sviatoslav Shevchuk
- Eparch: Meron Mazur, O.S.B.M. Bishop of the Eparchy of Imaculada Conceição in Prudentópolis
- Metropolitan Archbishop: Valdomiro Koubetch, O.S.B.M. Archbishop of the Archeparchy of São João Batista em Curitiba

The Ukrainian Catholic Eparchy of the Imaculada Conceição in Prudentópolis (or Imaculada Conceição in Prudentópolis of the Ukrainians) is a Ukrainian Greek Catholic (Byzantine Rite, Ukrainian language) eparchy (diocese) in the ecclesiastical province of the Metropolitan Archeparchy of São João Batista em Curitiba, who has no other suffragan, dependent on the Roman Congregation for the Eastern Churches.

Its cathedral episcopal see is Catedral Ucraniana Nossa Senhora da Imaculada Conceição, in Prudentópolis, Paraná, currently held by Eparch (Bishop) Meron Mazur, O.S.B.M.

It comprises twelve churches, constituting Ukrainian Catholic parishes in the Southern part of Brazil, concurrently with various Latin provinces.

== History ==
Established on 2014.05.12, as Eparchy (Eastern Catholic Diocese) of Imaculada Conceição in Prudentópolis (without pre-diocesan stage), on Brazilian territory split off from the then Diocese of São João Batista em Curitiba, which was simultaneously promoted Archeparchy and remains its Metropolitan Archdiocese.

== Ordinaries ==
Suffragan Eparchial Bishops of Imaculada Conceição in Prudentópolis

- Meron Mazur, Basilian Order of Saint Josaphat (O.S.B.M.) (12 May 2014 - ... ), previously Titular Bishop of Simitthu & Auxiliary Bishop of São João Batista em Curitiba (2005.12.21 – 2014.05.12)
