= Vittorio Sorotiuk =

Vittorio Sorotiuk (born 12 April 1945 in Prudentopolis, Parana) is a lawyer, left-wing social and political figure of Ukrainian origin in Brazil. Deputy president of the World Congress of Ukrainians, he represents the Ukrainian diaspora in South America as chairman of the Ukrainian-Brazilian Central Representation.

== Biography ==
His great-grandfather Semko Sorotyuk came from the village of Detkovtsy (within modern Ternopil region of Ukraine). His paternal grandparents, Joaquin Sorotyuk and Madalena Drogomirskaya, and maternal grandparents, Joao (Ivan) Gudyma and Ekaterina Konopatskaya, arrived in Brazil in 1896. His brother is a pysankar, the author of the pysanka in the Ukrainian Memorial in Curitiba.

Vittorio Sorotiuk graduated from the Faculty of Law of the Federal University of Parana with a Bachelor of Laws degree with the opportunity to work as a lawyer in the field of environmental law, he had also studied at the Institute of Development Studies of the University of Geneva in Switzerland. In 1967-1968, he worked as the head of a training center named after Hugo Simasa at the Faculty of Law of the Federal University of Parana.

He participated in left-wing student and trade union movements that fought against the military dictatorship that was established in Brazil in 1964. In 1968-1969, he headed the Central Committee (trade union) of students of the Federal University of Parana. In 1969, he organized protests against the authoritarian regime, for which he was imprisoned and tortured several times. In 1970, he was forced to emigrate to Chile, where at one of the student rallies he met the niece of President Salvador Allende, Eliana, who became his wife. After Allende was overthrown by Pinochet's coup in 1973, Sorotyuk was again imprisoned and tortured at the National Stadium before returning to Brazil. He was a member of the founding group of the Workers' Party (PT) in 1980.

From 1983 to 1991, he worked as a lawyer for the prosecutor's office of the Institute of Mineral Resources, Cartography and Flora of Parana. From 1991 to 1992, he was director of the Institute of Subsoil, Cartography and Flora of Paraná. During these years, he was also a member of the National Council of the Environment. In 1991, he became a member of the administrative council of Banestado Bank. From July to December 1992, he served as Director General of the Secretary of the Environment of the Government of Parana.

In 1992, he returned to the Office of the Prosecutor of the Institute of the Environment of Parana to work as a lawyer until 1995. From December 1992 to October 1994, he also worked as a special assistant to the governor of Parana. In October 1994, he became Secretary of the Environment of the Government of Parana. At the same time, he resigned from the administrative council of Banestado Bank.

From 1996-2002, he worked as environmental advocate at non-governmental environmental organizations. In 1997, he was appointed Deputy Chairman of the Environmental Commission of the Brazilian Bar Association in Parana. He held this position until 2002.

Along with his environmental advocacy, he actively participated in the development of Ukrainian organizations in Brazil. In 2002, he headed the supervisory board of the Ukrainian-Brazilian Central Representation. In 2003 he was elected its president and remains in office. He is also currently teaching environmental law at the Faculty of Law of the University of Tuiuti in, Curitiba.
