= Eparchy of Prešov =

(Arch)Eparchy (-diocese) of Prešov (also: Preszów, Priashiv, Pryashev, Eperjes) may refer to the following ecclesiastical jurisdictions with see at Prešov, Slovakia :

Eastern Orthodox

- Orthodox Archeparchy of Prešov and Slovakia, current primatial Metropolitan Archdiocese (initially eparchy = diocese) of the autocephalous Czech and Slovak Orthodox Church.
- Eparchy of Mukachevo and Prešov, former Eastern Orthodox diocese that existed from 1931 to 1945, under ecclesiastical jurisdiction of the Serbian Orthodox Church.

Eastern Catholic

- Slovak Catholic Metropolitan Archeparchy of Prešov, current Eastern Catholic (Byzantine rite) archdiocese of the Slovak Byzantine Catholic Church.

== Bibliography ==
- Athanasius Pekar, Historical Background of the Eparchy of Prjashev (1968)

== See also ==
- Eparchy of Mukachevo (disambiguation)
