= Athanasius Pekar =

Eastern Catholic educator and scholar

Father Vasily Atanasi "Athanasius Basil" Pekar OSBM
- Native name: Атанасій Пекар
- Church: Ukrainian Catholic Church

Orders
- Ordination: 1946

Personal details
- Born: March 1, 1922 Perechyn, Uzhhorod Raion, Zakarpatska, Ukraine
- Died: September 28, 2011 (aged 89) Glen Cove, Nassau County, New York, US
- Occupation: Ukrainian Catholic priest, author, academic
- Education: Pontifical Urban University; Pontifical Gregorian University

Vasily Atanasi "Athanasius Basil" Pekar (Ukrainian: Атанасій Пекар) OSBM (1 Mar 1922 – 28 Sep 2011) was a notable American Ukrainian Catholic priest, author, and academic born in Perechyn, Uzhhorod Raion, Zakarpatska, now in Ukraine. Pekar was a hieromonk member of the faculty at Byzantine Catholic Seminary of Ss. Cyril and Methodius in Pittsburgh, Pennsylvania; he was an editor of and contributor to the periodical Byzantine Catholic World. He was ordained in 1946 and completed studies at the Pontifical Urban University (B.Ph. 1942, Dr.Th. 1947) followed by a BaccHe in 1948 at the Pontifical Gregorian University. He was a member of the Order of Saint Basil the Great, also known as the Basilian Order of Saint Josaphat; he served as pastor of churches in western Pennsylvania including St. John the Baptist Greek Catholic Church in Uniontown. He died in Glen Cove, Nassau County, New York.

Pekar was a member of the Ukrainian Free Academy of Sciences (UVAN) formed by Ukrainian émigré scholars in Augsburg, Germany, as an academy in exile; the Shevchenko Scientific Society, and the faculty of the Ukrainian Catholic University.

On 1 March 2018, Uzhhorod National University held a symposium on Pekar's life and writings entitled "A Life Dedicated to Truth: Hieromonk Athanasius Vasyl Pekar, OSBM" (Життя присвячене Правді: ієромонах Атанасій Василь Пекар).

== See also ==
- Byzantine Catholic World

== Bibliography ==
Pekar was a prolific author of books, pamphlets, journal articles, and translations of other authors in Ukrainian and in English, publishing in Italy, Ukraine, the United States, and Brazil. His Outlines of the History of the Church in Transcarpathia (Нариси історії Церкви Закарпаття) in three volumes was begun in 1967 and completed posthumously in 2014.

- Basil Shereghy and Athanasius Pekar, The Training of Carpatho-Ruthenian Clergy (Pittsburgh, 1951)
- Усміх у смерті (New York, 1959)
- Відродження водою і духом святим : Св. тайна хрещення (New York, 1959)
- Печать дару Св. Духа (New York, 1959)
- василіянський ісповідник (Glen Cove, New York: St. Josaphat Monastery, 1961; reprinted 1992)
- Владика-мученик Теодор Юрій Ромжа (New York, 1962)
- Saint Josaphat (1580–1623) (Basilian Fathers, 1967)
- Нарис історії Церкви Закарпаття.: Єрархічне оформлення (Rome, 1967) (volume one)
- Historical Background of the Eparchy of Prjashev (Pittsburgh: Byzantine Seminary Press, 1968)
- Our Slavic Heritage (Pittsburgh: Byzantine Seminary Press Publications, 1969)
- Досконалий Християнин. Чернечий ідеал св. Василія Великого (New York, 1970), 2005 Lviv edition ISBN 966-658-051-9
- Basilian Reform in Transcarpathia (Rome, 1971)
- (translator), Alexander Duchnovič, Chronologica historia almae dioecesis Eperjessiensis, ab origine videlicet usque obitum primi Episcopi (1971)
- (editor) Funeral services according to the Byzantine-Slavonic Rite (Pittsburgh: Byzantine Seminary Press, 1971)
- Restoration of the Greek Catholic Church in Czechoslovakia (1973)
- Our Past and Present: Historical Outlines of the Byzantine Ruthenian Metropolitan Province (Pittsburgh, 1974)
- "Historical background of the Carpatho-Ruthenians in America" in Ukrainian Historical Review (1976), pp. 87–116.
- Our Martyred Bishop Romzha (1911–1947) (Byzantine Seminary Press, 1977)
- Bishop Basil Hopko: Confessor of the Faith (Pittsburgh: Byzantine Seminary Press, 1979)
- The Bishops of Mukachevo Eparchy (Pittsburgh: Byzantine Seminary Press, 1979)
- Bishop Paul P. Gojdich, O.S.B.M., Confessor of Our Times (1980)
- Апостол Христового Серця. Життєпис Христофора Г. Миськова, ЧСВВ (Prudentópolis, 1980)
- "You shall be witnesses unto me:" Contribution to the Martyrology of the Byzantine Catholic Church in Subcarpathian Ruthenia (1985)
- Bishop Alexander Chira, Prisoner of Christ (Pittsburgh, 1988)
- The History of the Church in Carpathian Rus' (Columbia University Press for the Carpatho-Rusyn Research Center, 1992) ISBN 9780880332194
- "The Union of Brest and Attempts to Destroy It" in Analecta OSBM, Section II, Volume XIV (XX) 1–4, 1992, pages 152–170.
  - Dimitry V. Pospielovsky, review in Journal of Church and State 37:1 (Winter 1995), pp. 181–182.
  - Paul W. Knoll, review in Church History 65:2 (1996), pp. 356–357 (Cambridge University Press).
  - Michał Giedroyć, review in Canadian-American Slavic Studies, 29, 1995, 428 10.1163/221023995X00539
- "Ipatij Potij, the Protagonist of the Union" in Analecta ordinis S. Basilii Magni anno CCCC Unionis Berestensis et CCCL Unionis Uzhorodensis (Rome, 1996).
- Нариси історії церкви Закарпаття (Rome and Lviv, 1997) (volume two)
- Ісповідники віри нашої сучасности: причинок до мартиролога Української Католицької Церкви під совітами (2001) ISBN 9789667086930
- (posthumous) Нариси історії Церкви Закарпаття. Том ІІI: Монаше життя (Uzhorod, 2014) (volume three)
