= Basil Shereghy =

Monsignor Basil Shereghy (1918 – 1988) was a leading Ruthenian Greek Catholic Church priest and professor, as well as a cultural activist for Rusyns in the United States.

He was born in Dorobratovo (Hungarian Drágabártfalva), Austria-Hungary (historic Czechoslovakia (1918–1939), Hungary (1939–45), now Ukraine). Ordained in 1942 in the Eparchy of Mukachevo, he taught in the Greek Catholic seminary in Uzhorod during World War II.

In 1946 he emigrated to the United States, serving for the rest of his life in the Byzantine Catholic Metropolitan Church of Pittsburgh. He worked as a professor of language and liturgy at the Byzantine Catholic Seminary of SS. Cyril and Methodius in Pittsburgh, Pennsylvania. He also was a longtime editor (1970–1986) of the diocesan newspaper Byzantine Catholic World, which he co-founded with Athanasius Pekar.

== Death ==
He died on 16 June 1988 in Pittsburgh.

== Books ==
- What Are Greek Catholics?, (Lisle, Ill.: The Byzantine-Slavonic Publications Committee, 1948)
- Vospitanije podkarpato-ruskoho svjaščenstva / The training of Carpatho-Ruthenian clergy, co-author with Basil Athanasius Pekar, (Pittsburgh: Byzantine Seminary Press, 1951)
- Greek Catholic Dictionary, (Pittsburgh: Byzantine Seminary Press, 1951)
- The Liturgy of St. John Chrysostom, Ruthenian Form, (Collegeville, Minn.: Liturgical Press, 1961)
- The Liturgical Year of the Byzantine-Slavonic Rite, (Pittsburgh: Byzantine Seminary Press, 1968)
- A Historical Album Compiled on the Occasion of the Seventy-fifth Anniversary of the United Societies, editor, (McKeesport, Pa.: United Societies of the U.S.A., 1978)
- Bishop Basil Takach "The Good Shepherd", (Pittsburgh: Byzantine Seminary Press, 1979)
- The Byzantine Catholics, (Pittsburgh: Byzantine Seminary Press, 1981)
- Fifty Years of Piety: A History of the Uniontown Pilgrimage (Pittsburgh: Byzantine Seminary Press, 1985)
