= Sebastian Sabol =

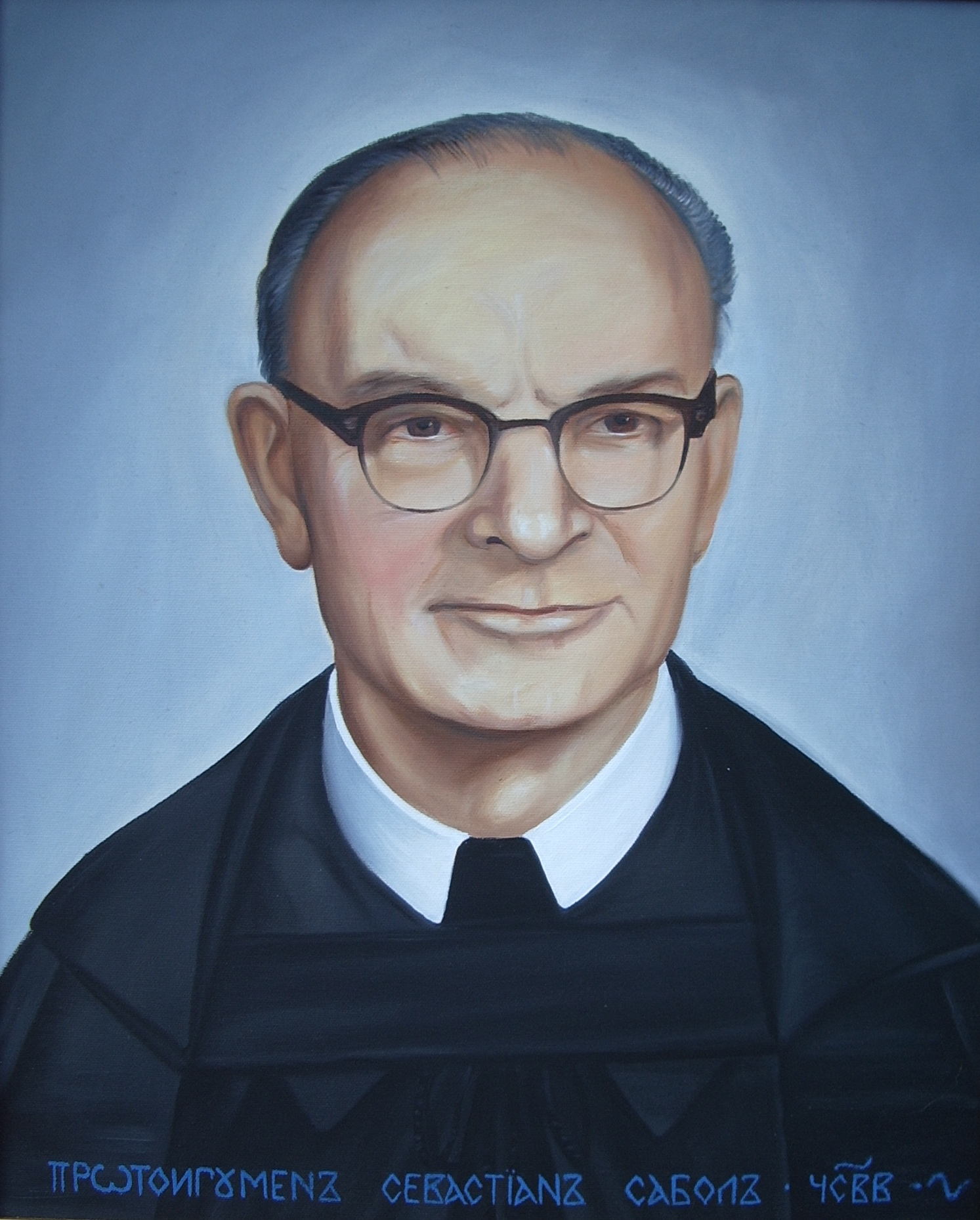
- Church: Ukrainian Greek Catholic Church

Orders
- Ordination: 26 August 1934 by Pavel Peter Gojdič

Personal details
- Born: 7 December 1909 Prešov
- Died: 20 February 2003 (aged 93) Warren, Michigan USA
- Denomination: Greek Catholic
- Parents: Michael Sabol; Mariya Sabol
- Occupation: Basilian priest
- Education: Pontifical Gregorian University

Sebastian Stepan Sabol, O.S.B.M. (Ukrainian: Севастіян Степан Сабол; December 7, 1909, Prešov, Czechoslovakia – February 20, 2003, Warren, Michigan, USA) was a Ukrainian Basilian priest, poet and writer.

== Biography ==
Sebastian Stepan Sabol joined the Basilian monastic order in 1924. He went on to study at Mukachevo Saint Nicholas's Monastery Chernecha Hora, Mukacheve, the Krekhiv Monastery, the Lavriv Saint Onuphrius's Monastery, and the monastery in Dobromyl. He was ordained to the priesthood in Prešov in 1934 and in 1935 completed work for the licentiate of theology at the Gregorian University in Rome. He was prefect for students at the Uzhhorod Theological Seminary and taught at a gymnasium in Uzhhorod, also editing the Misionar (1937–1938) and Blahovisnyk (1939), monthlies for the eparchy. Arrested in 1939 by the Hungarians in Khust, he was deported to the Prešov Region of Slovakia. There, on the basis of his founding four new Basilian monasteries and a novitiate, the Basilian province of Saint Cyril and Saint Methodius was created in 1948. In December 1948 he fled to Austria to escape the Czechoslovak Communist regime. He was sentenced in absentia to life imprisonment by a Prague court, as an "American spy, the chief leader of the Ukrainian Insurgent Army, and an enemy of the people". He proceeded to studies at the Gregorian University in Rome, earning a doctorate in theology in 1950.

He then emigrated to the United States where he became pastor of St. John the Baptist parish in Uniontown, Pennsylvania. He later served in Bedford, Ohio, and Hamtramck, Michigan, before settling in Warren, Michigan where he remained until his death in 2003, at the age of 93. He had also served as superior of the Transcarpathian branch of the Basilians monastic order. Sabol is also remembered as baptizing Jews to save them from the Holocaust.

In 1928 Sabol began writing poetry, using the pseudonym Zoreslav. In October 2009, an All-Ukrainian Literary Prize was named after Zoreslav by philanthropist Stanislav Arzhevitin and the Transcarpathian organization of the National Union of Writers of Ukraine. It is awarded to writers and scholars for works on Ukrainian history and culture, the literature of Transcarpathia, and the legacy of S. Sabol-Zoreslav.

== Works ==
=== Poetry ===
- Zi sertsem u rukakh (With My Heart in My Hands), 1933
- Sontse i blakyt’ (The Sun and the Sky), 1936
- Z rannikh vesen (From Early Springtimes, 1963

=== Books ===
- Katolytstvo i Pravoslaviie (Catholicism and Orthodoxy), 1955
- Vid Uhors'koï Rusy do Karpats'koï Ukraïny (From Hungarian Ruthenia to Carpatho-Ukraine), 1956, using the pseudonym Yurii Borzhava
- Holhota Hreko-katolyts'koï Tserkvy v Chekho-Slovachchyni (Golgotha of the Greek Catholic Church in Czechoslovakia), 1978.
