= Byzantine Catholic Seminary of Ss. Cyril and Methodius =

Coordinates: 40°29′4″N 80°0′57″W

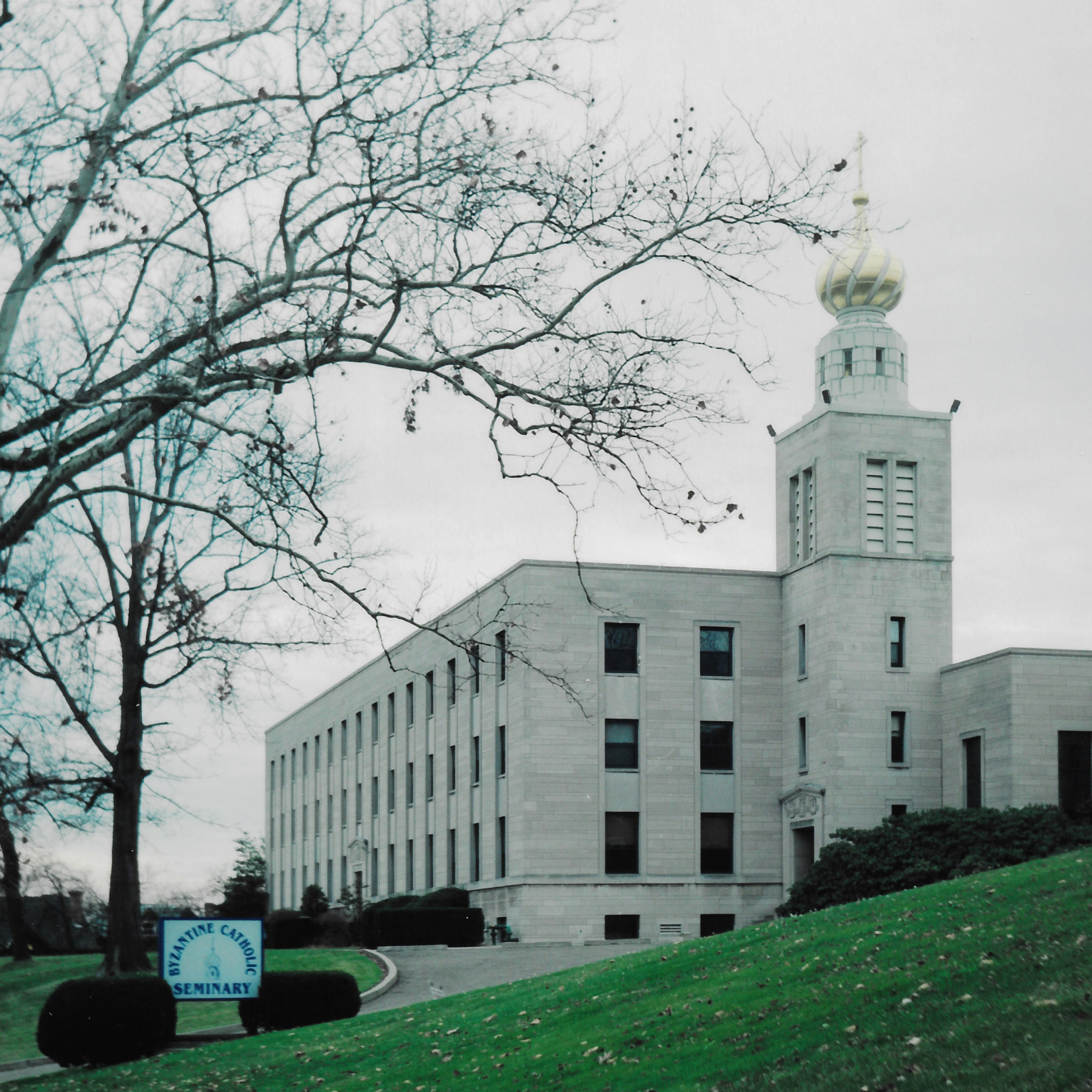
- Type: Private graduate institution
- Established: June 28, 1950 (76 years ago)
- Affiliations: Byzantine Catholic
- Rector: Very Rev. Ronald C. Barusefski, J.C.D.
- Location: Pittsburgh, Pennsylvania, US
- Website: bcs.edu

The Byzantine Catholic Seminary of Ss. Cyril and Methodius is an American degree-granting school of theology in Pittsburgh, Pennsylvania. The seminary prepares candidates for priestly ministry to the Byzantine Catholic churches of North America. As of 2019, this includes the Ruthenian Byzantine Catholic Church, the Melkite Greek Catholic Eparchy of Newton, the Romanian Catholic Eparchy of St George's in Canton, and the Ukrainian Catholic Eparchy of Saint Josaphat in Parma.

The seminary was established by the Byzantine Catholic Metropolitan Church of Pittsburgh in 1950 on Pittsburgh's Observatory Hill. In addition to the training of priests, the seminary offers programs in deacon formation as well as a cantor institute.

== Academic information ==
The Byzantine Catholic Seminary is accredited by the Association of Theological Schools in the United States and Canada.

=== Degree programs ===
- Master of Divinity (M.Div.)
- Master of Arts in Theology (M.A.) in collaboration with and from Duquesne University
- Master of Arts in Byzantine Catholic Theology (M.A.T.)

=== Online programs ===
- Certificate in Eastern Christian Studies (C.E.C.S.)

=== Non-degree programs ===
- Certificate in Eastern Christian Studies (C.E.C.S.)
- Cantor Institute
- Deacon Formation Program

== Notable people ==
- Athanasius Pekar
- Basil Shereghy
