= Severian Baranyk =

Ukrainian Catholic priest and martyr (1889–1941)

Blessed Severian Baranyk OSBM
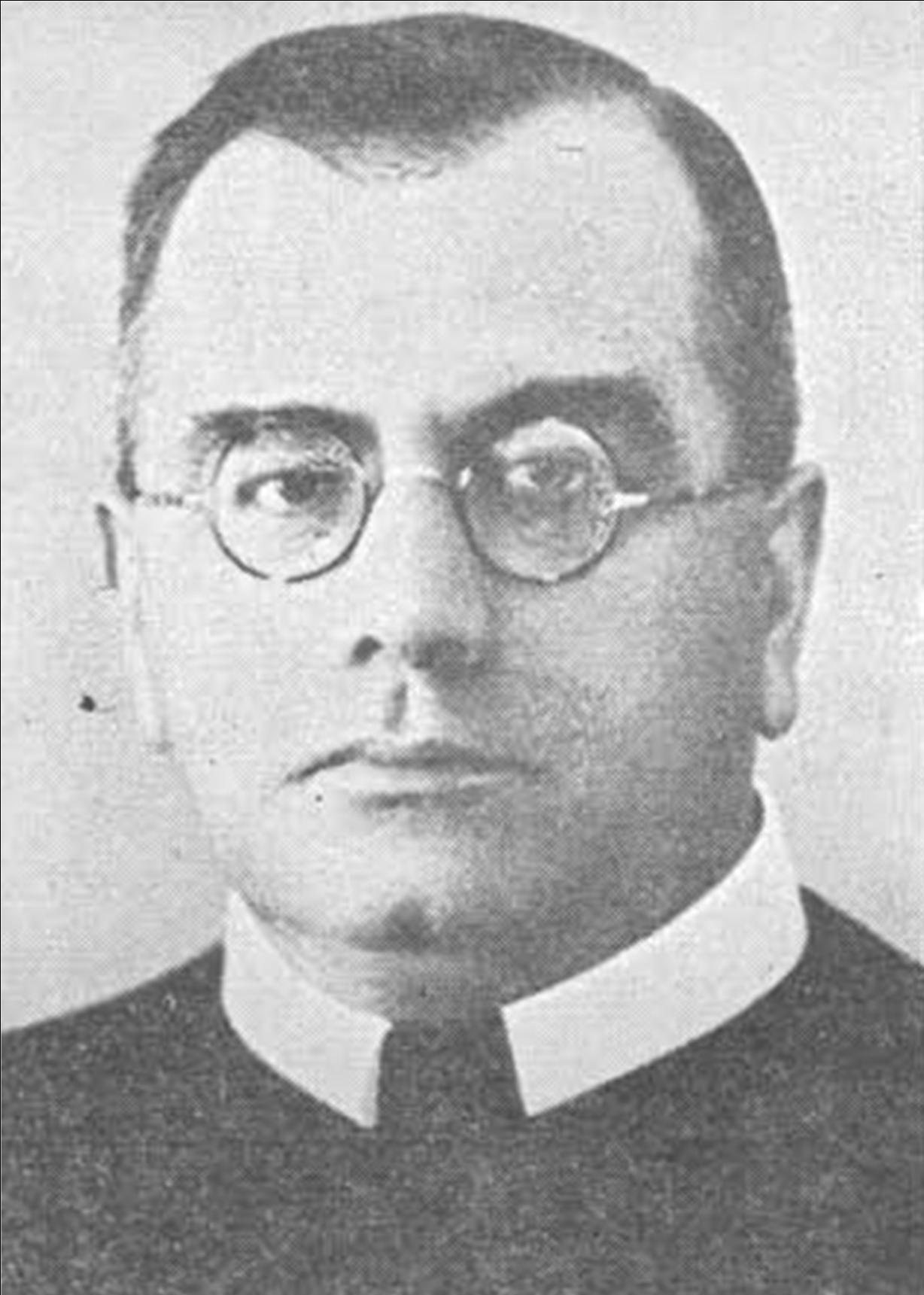
- Born: 18 July 1889; Uhnów, Austrian Galicia, Austria-Hungary (now Uhniv, Ukraine)
- Died: c. June 1941 (aged 51–52); Drohobych prison, Ukrainian SSR, Soviet Union
- Cause of death: torture

Severian Stefan Baranyk (Ukrainian: Северіян Бараник; 18 July 1889 - c. June 1941) was a Ukrainian Greek Catholic priest and martyr.

Baranyk was born in Uhnów in Austrian Galicia (modern-day Uhniv, Ukraine). He entered the monastery of the Order of St Basil the Great in Krekhiv in 1904. On 16 May, he took his first monastic vows and, on 24 September 1910, he took his perpetual vows. He was ordained to the priesthood on 14 February 1915. Baranyk was known for his preaching, and his life was noted for his special kindness to youth and orphans. In 1932, he was made the prior (hegumen) of the Basilian monastery in Drohobych.

On 26 June 1941, the NKVD arrested him. He was taken to Drohobych prison and never seen alive again. After the Soviets withdrew from the city his mutilated body was found in the prison with signs of torture, including cross-shaped knife slashes across his chest.

He was beatified by Pope John Paul II on 27 June 2001.

Yasyf Lastoviak, in a testimony, recounted finding Stefan Baranyk's corpse:

Behind the prison I saw a big hole which has been covered up, filled with sand. When the Bolsheviks retreated, the Germans came and people rushed to the prison to find their relatives. The Germans allowed people into the area of the prison in small groups to claim their murdered relatives, but most people stood by the gates, so I went to the side and climbed a tree. There was a terrible stink […] I saw how the Germans sent people to uncover the hole which was filled with sand. The hole was new because the people uncovered it with their hands. They dragged out the murdered bodies. There was little covering near the hole, and under it I saw the body of Father Severian Baranyk. Basilian, with visible marks of his prison tortures; his body had unnaturally swelled black, his face terrible. Dad later said that on his chest the sign of the cross had been slashed.
