= Kudryntsi Castle =

Castle in Ternopil Oblast, Ukraine

Coordinates: 48°36′36″N 26°16′48″E

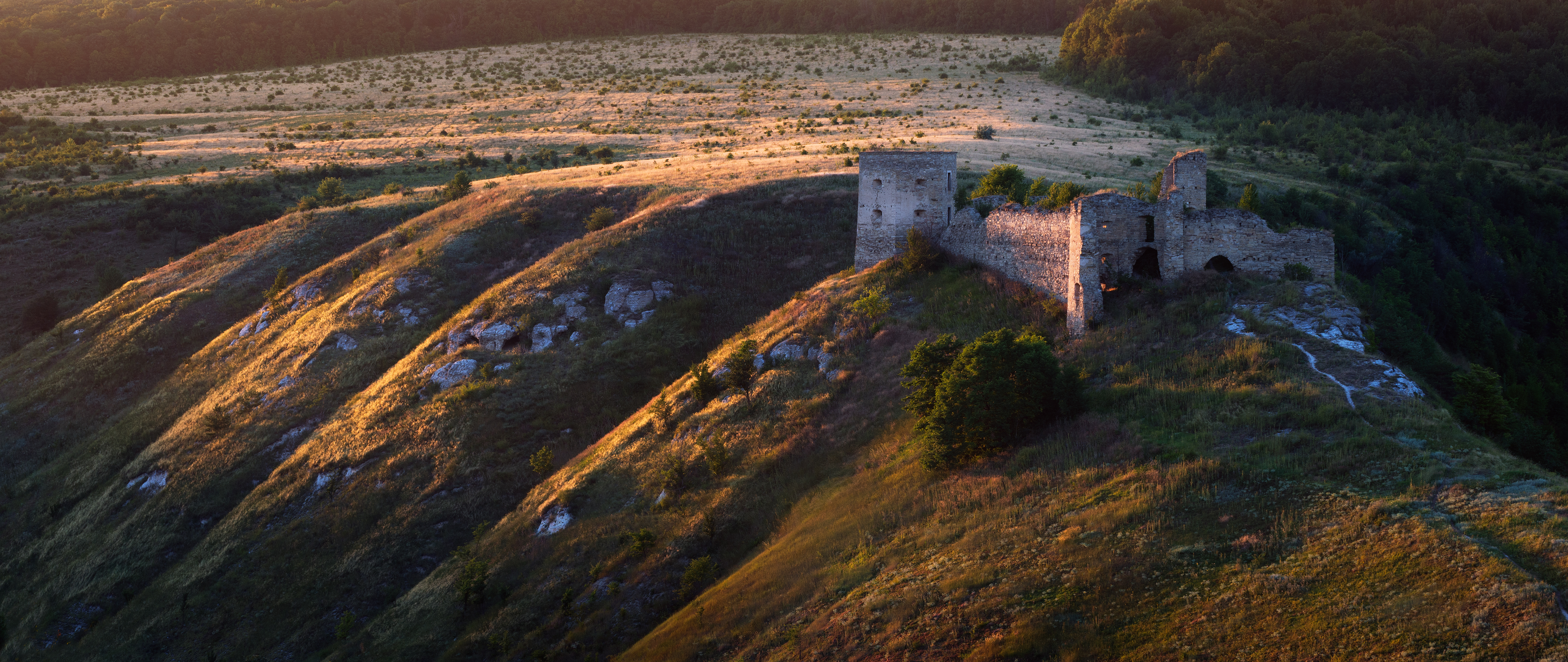
The ruins of Kudryntsi Castle.

The ruined Kudryntsi Castle (Ukrainian: Кудринецький замок, romanized: Kudrynets'kyi zamok, Polish: Zamek w Kudryńcach) is perched on a hilltop overlooking the Zbruch River in Chortkiv Raion, Ternopil Oblast, Ukraine, 25 km west of a larger fortress in Kamianets-Podilskyi. It was built in the early 17th century by Jan Szczęsny Herburt and throughout the ensuing century was subjected to repeated sieges by the Cossacks and the Turks. By the 19th century, some portions of the walls had crumbled away, and the structure was left to its fate.

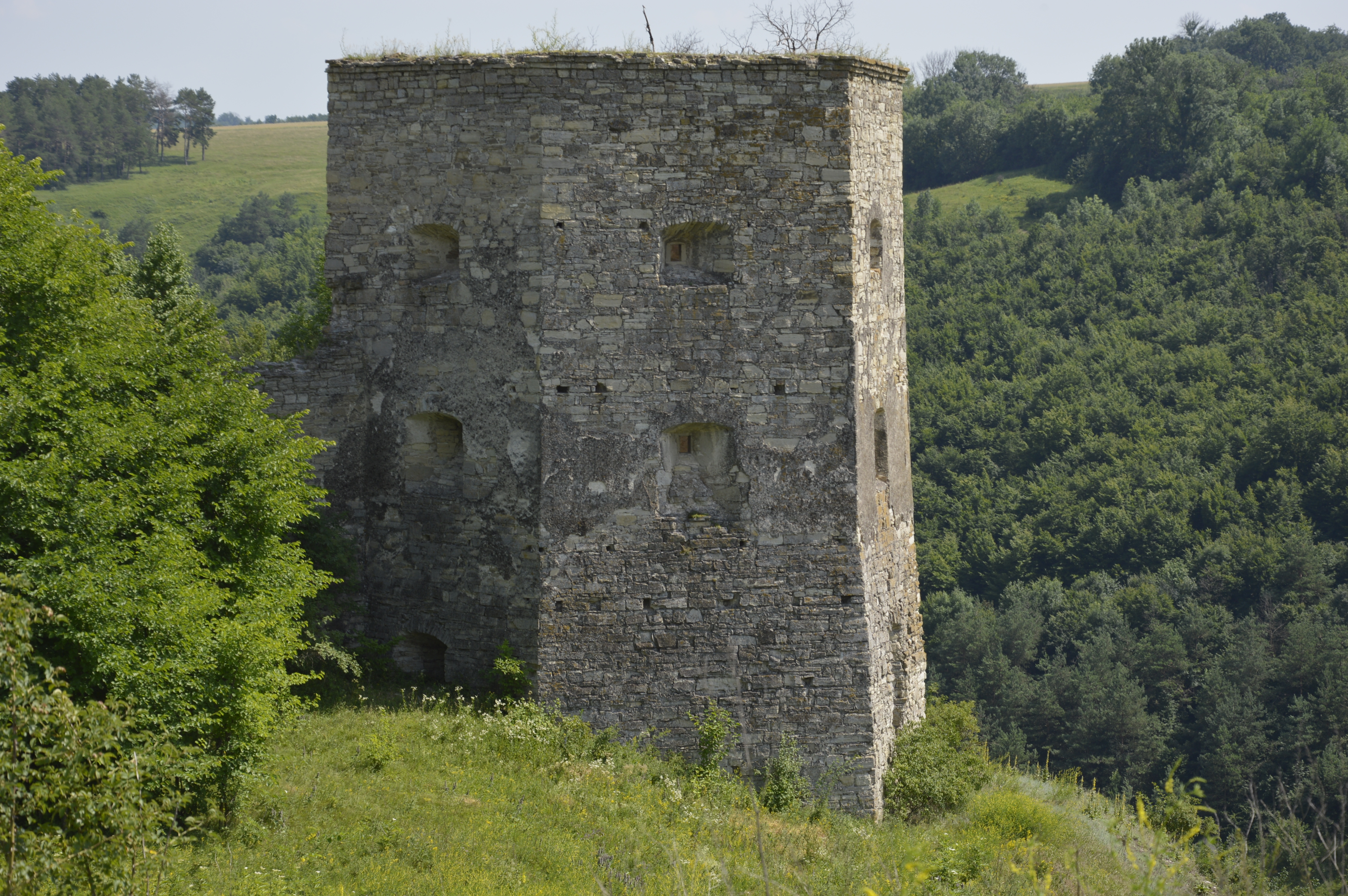

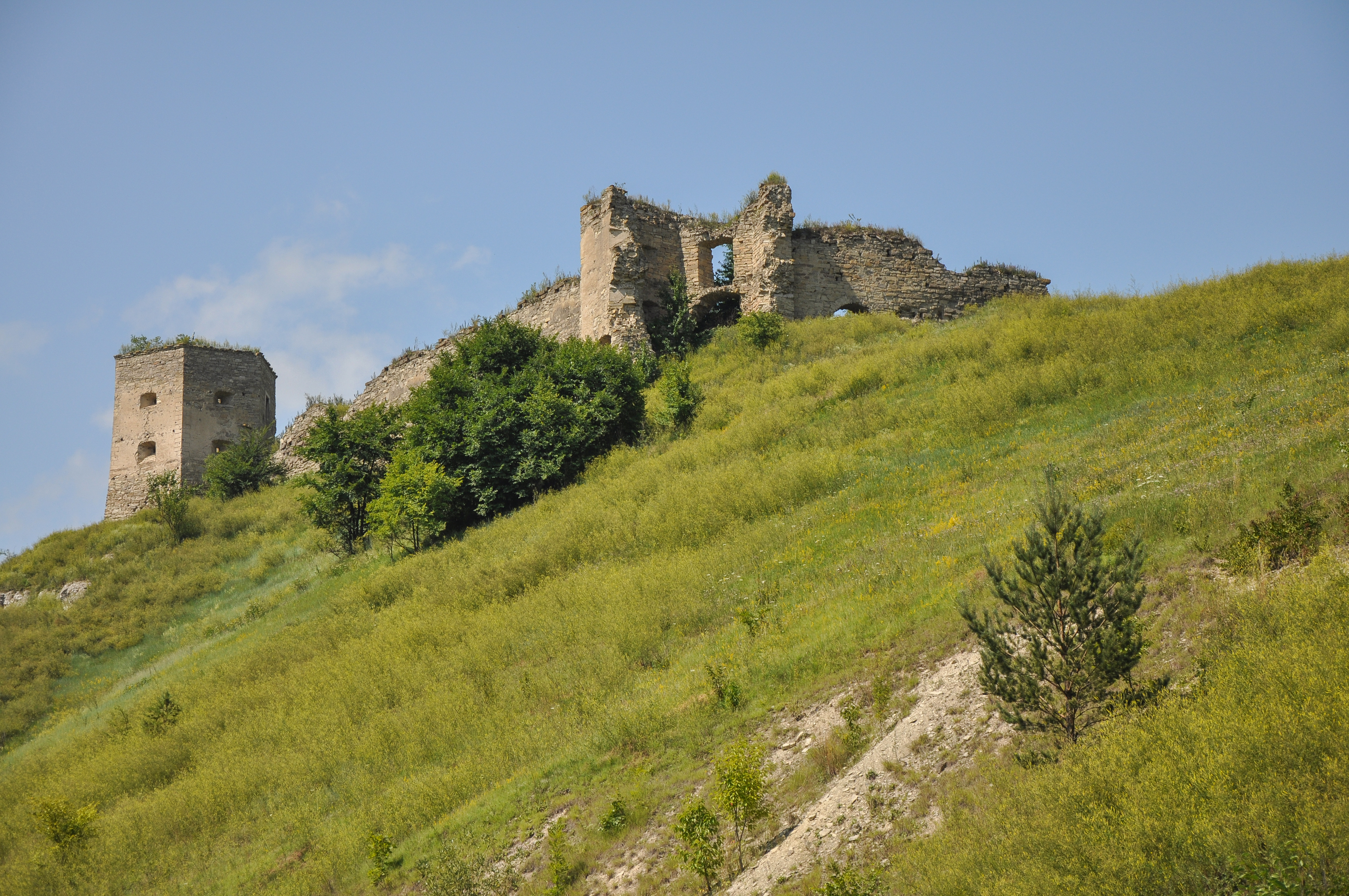

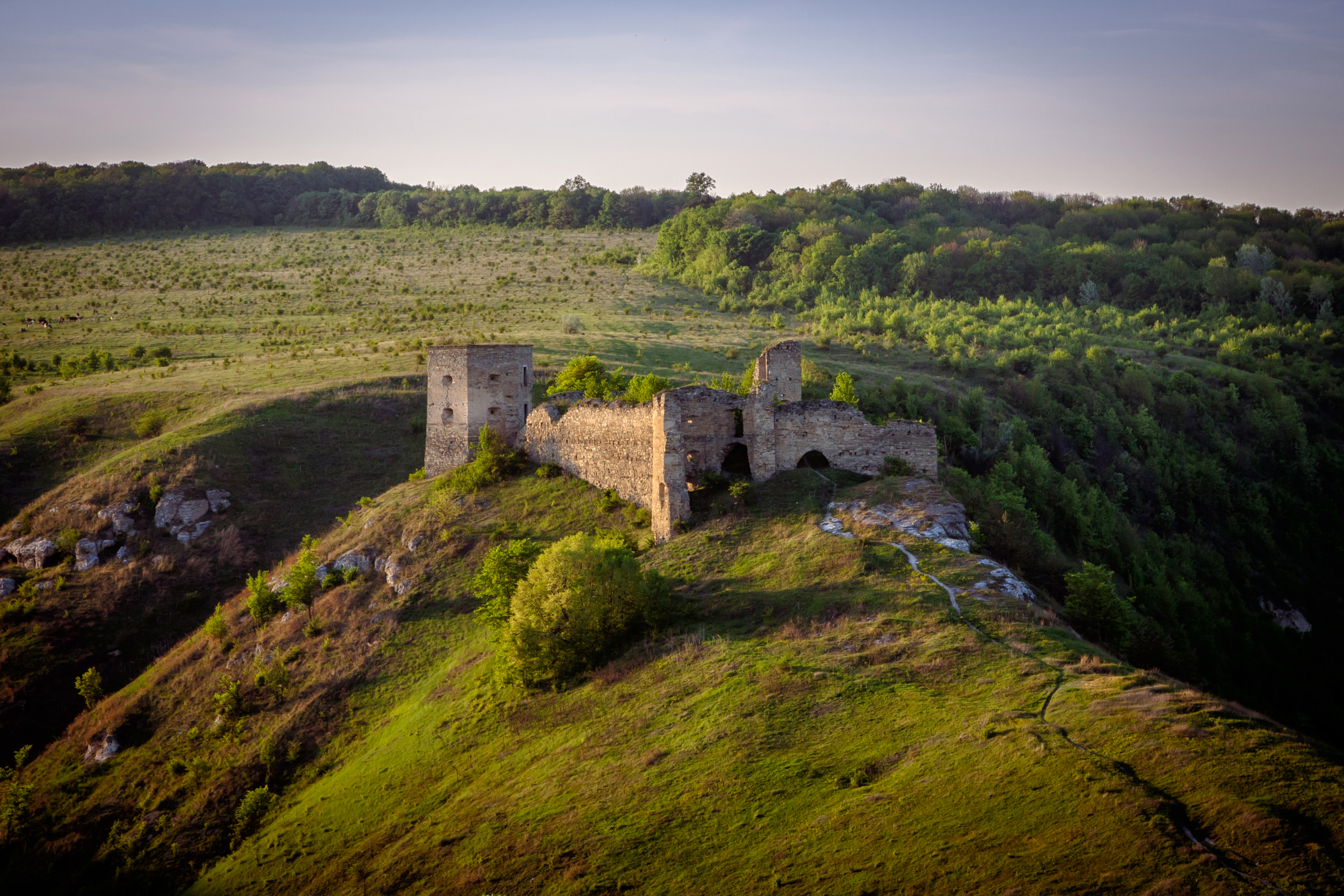
