= Dobromyl Monastery =

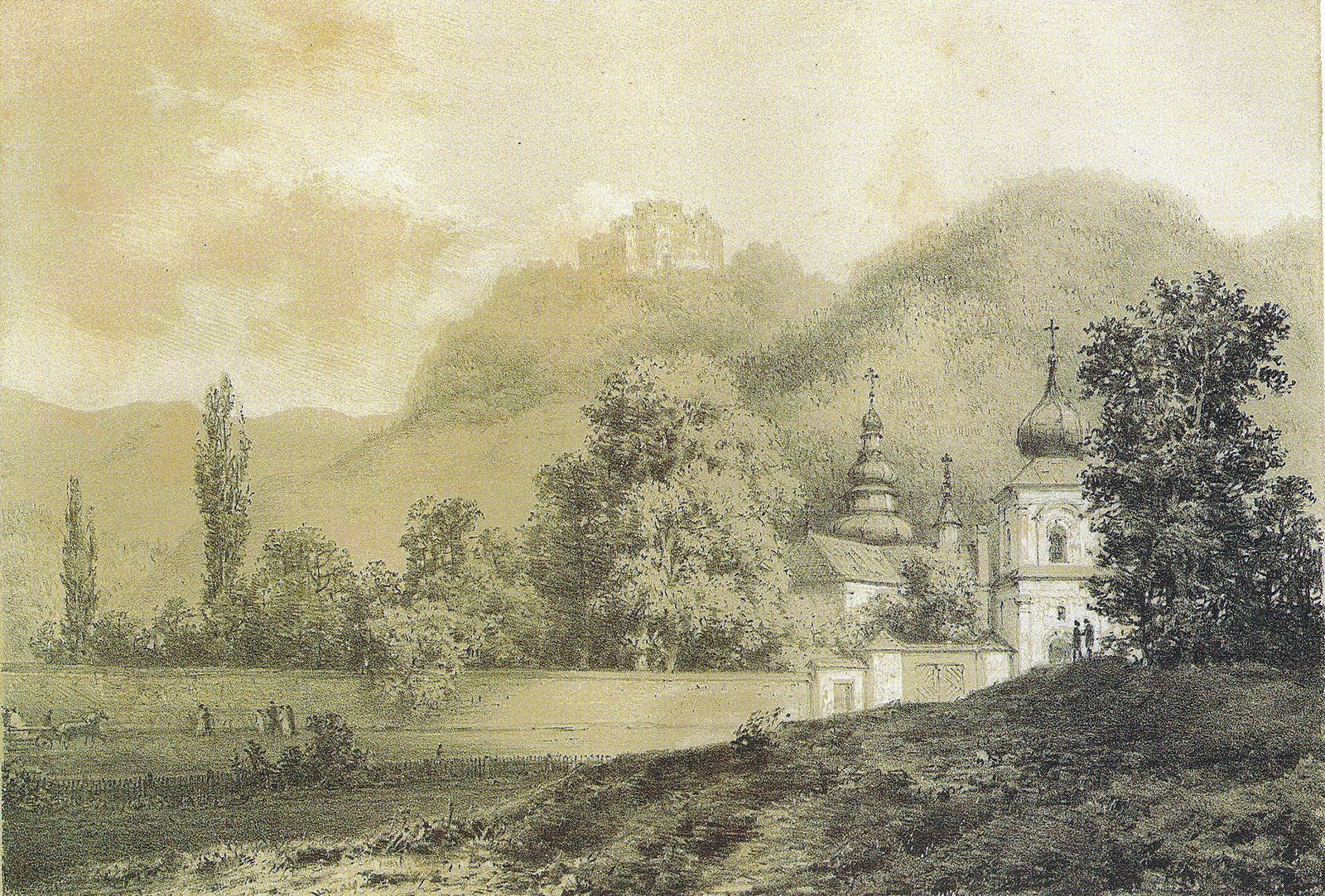
Napoleon Orda. Dobromyl

The Dobromyl Monastery of St. Onuphrius (Ukrainian: Добромильський монастир) of the Order of St. Basil the Great was founded in 1613 near the city of Dobromyl (now Lviv Oblast) in Ukraine.

== History ==
Its founders were Lviv monks Anastasius and Joel, who acted with the assistance of local patrons — the starosts of Mostyska and Sudova Vyshnia, Jan Szczęsny Herburt and his wife, Princess Yelyzaveta Zaslavska. Initially, wooden churches were built on the monastery grounds: St. Nicholas (demolished in 1818) and St. Elijah (sold to the village of Przekopana near Przemyśl in 1772).

Between 1705 and 1723, the brick St. Onuphrius Church was built, designed by architect J. Mamrowcew from Jarosław. Later, in 1731, the monastery building was constructed, followed by the bell tower in 1751. The monastery was an important educational center, where a novitiate operated from 1693 to 1781 and from 1793 to 1902, and a theological school functioned from 1758 to 1771. The monastery administered several smaller monasteries. In 1744, the monastery of St. John the Theologian in Przemyśl was annexed to it, and the miraculous image of St. Onuphrius was transferred from the village of Kolodentsi.

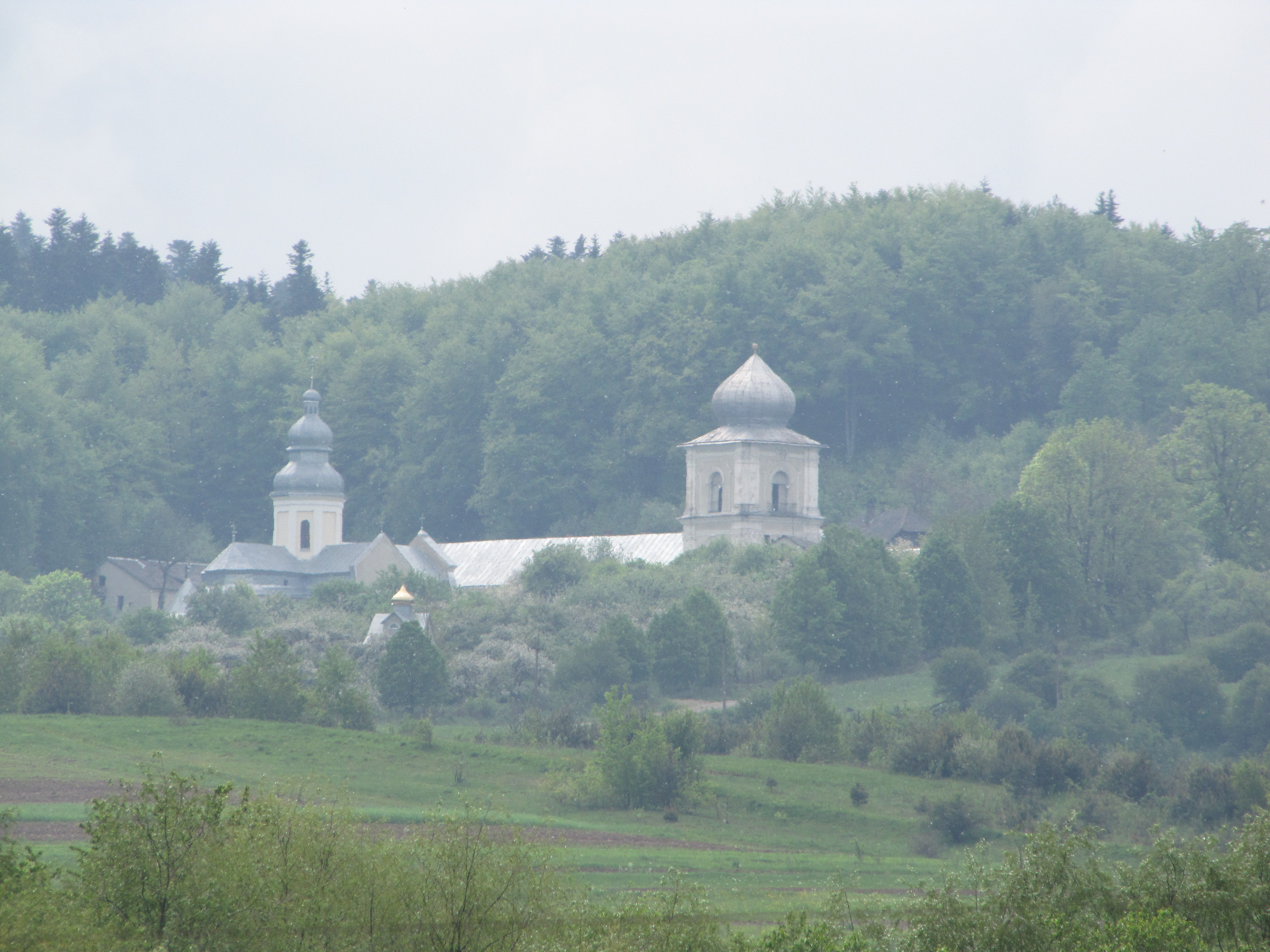
Modern view of the monastery

After the Dobromyl reform of the Order of St. Basil the Great in 1882, the Dobromyl Monastery acquired special significance, becoming the center of the Order's restoration. Many future prominent figures served as novices here, including D.-D. Tkachuk, P.-P. Fidias, A.-O. Kalysh, S.-S. Ortynskyi, E.-I. Lomnytskyi, M.-M. Lonchyna, and Andrey Sheptytsky. In 1886, Pope Leo XIII gave the monastery the relics of Saint Pasyv, the martyr, which, however, due to the significant dampness of the walls, were transferred to the Krekhiv Monastery in 1902.

After 1905, the Basilians left Dobromyl, and the monastery gradually fell into disrepair. It was only restored in 1928 under the leadership of Hegumen Y. Labaia. Philosophical studies were reopened here, followed by higher secondary school studies of the Basilian Order. In 1931, the monastery became the venue for the General Chapter of the Basilian Order, at which D.-D. Tkachuk was elected archimandrite.

In 1946, the monastery was finally closed by the Soviet authorities. From 1950, a women's psychoneurological boarding school operated on its territory. Monastery was returned to the Order of St. Basil the Great in 1992. From 2000, its current hegumen has been M. Fliachok.
