= Ukrainian Catholic Archeparchy of São João Batista em Curitiba =

Eastern Catholic archeparchy in Brazil

Archeparchy of São João Batista em Curitiba Sancti Ioannis Baptistae Curitibensis Ucrainorum Архиєпархія з Сан-Жуан-Батіста ем Куритиба
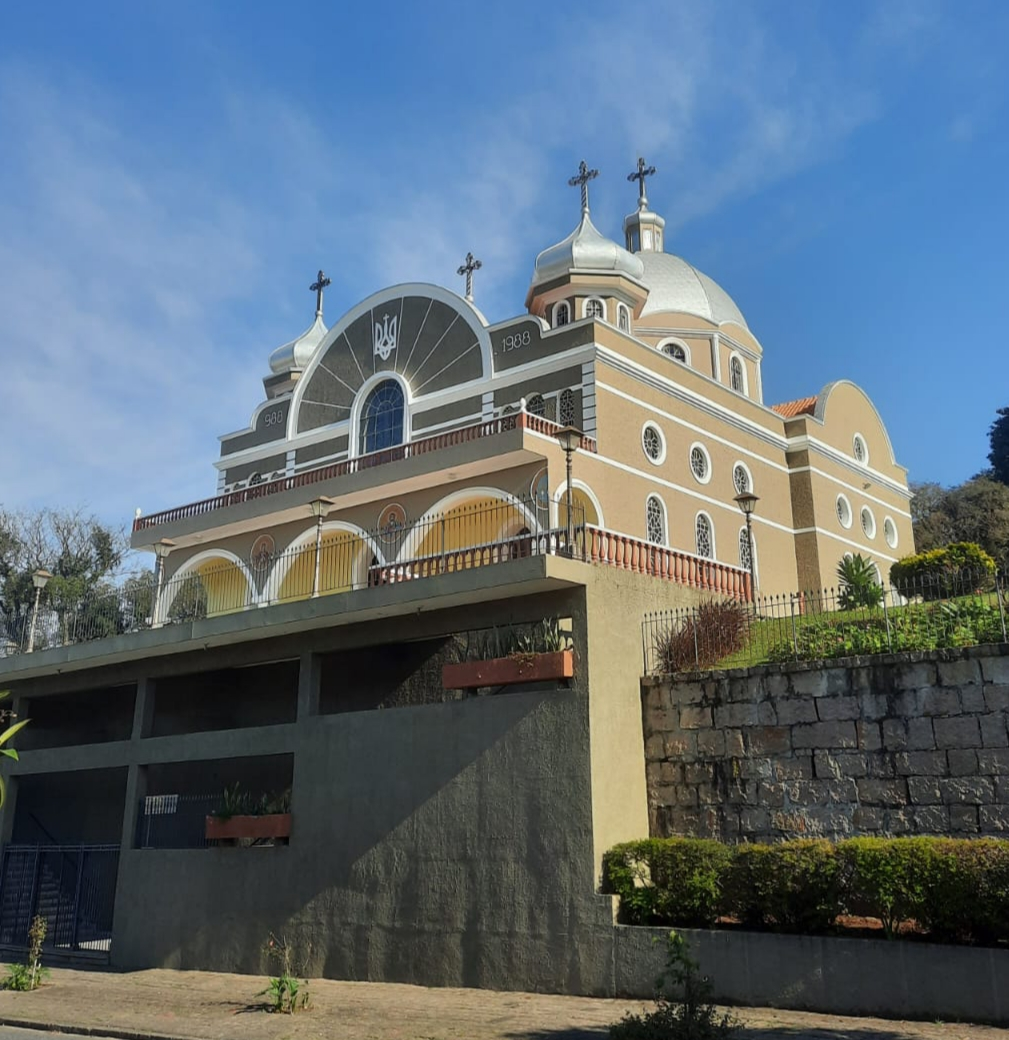
- Metropolitan cathedral in Curitiba

Location
- Country: Brazil
- Territory: Brazil
- Ecclesiastical province: São João Batista em Curitiba
- Headquarters: Curitiba, Brazil
- Population: 162,000

Information
- Sui iuris church: Ukrainian Greek Catholic
- Rite: Byzantine
- Established: November 29, 1971
- Cathedral: Cathedral of St John the Baptist in Curitiba

Current leadership
- Pope: Leo XIV
- Major Archbishop: Sviatoslav Shevchuk
- Archeparch: Valdomiro Koubetch, O.S.B.M.

Website
- Website of the Diocese

The Ukrainian Greek Catholic Archparchy or Archdiocese of (São João Batista em) Curitiba (Latin: Archparchia Sancti Ioannis Baptistae Curitibensis Ucrainorum) is a Ukrainian Greek Catholic archeparchy located in the city of Curitiba, which is also the Metropolitan see of a Ukrainian Greek Catholic Ecclesiastical province in Curitiba in Brazil. The ecclesiastical province has one suffragan, the Eparchy of Imaculada Conceição in Prudentópolis (Ukrainian).

== History ==
It was established on May 30, 1962, as Apostolic Exarchate (exempt, i;e. directly subject to the Holy See, not part of any ecclesiastical province) of Brazil. On November 29, 1971, the exarchate was promoted as the Eparchy (diocese) of São João Batista em Curitiba.

== Bishops ==
=== Episcopal ordinaries ===
So far, its exarchs and (arch)bishops -often monks in the Eastern tradition- always belonged to the Basilian order.

Apostolic Exarchs of Brazil (Ukrainian Catholic Rite)

- Bishop José Romão Martenetz (1962.05.30 – 1971.11.29; cfr. infra)

Eparchs (Bishops) of São João Batista em Curitiba (Ukrainian Catholic Rite)

- Bishop José Romão Martenetz (cfr. supra; 1971.11.29 – 1978.03.10)
- Bishop Efraím Basílio Krevey (1978.03.10 – 2006.12.13)
- Bishop Valdomiro Koubetch (2006.12.13 – 2014.05.12; cfr. infra)

Metropolitan Archeparch(s (Archbishops)

- Archeparch Valdomiro Koubetch (cfr. supra; 2014.05.12 – present)

=== Coadjutor bishops ===
- Efraím Basílio Krevey (Krevei) (1971–1978)
- Valdomiro Koubetch (2003–2006)

=== Auxiliary bishops ===
- Meron Mazur (2005–2014), appointed Bishop of Imaculada Conceição in Prudentópolis (Ukrainian)
- Daniel Kozelinski Netto (2007–2016), appointed Bishop of Santa María del Patrocinio en Buenos Aires (Ukrainian), Argentina

== References and External links ==
- GCatholic.org
- Catholic Hierarchy
