= Byzantine Catholic World =

The Byzantine Catholic World is the official newspaper of the Byzantine Catholic Metropolitan Church of Pittsburgh, Pennsylvania, United States.

The paper's mission is "to teach the Gospel message in the rich tradition of the Byzantine Catholic Church; to encourage people to reflect the image of Christ in everyday activities of life; to offer spiritual formation through changing times; and to celebrate community among Byzantine Catholics around the Archeparchy of Pittsburgh and across the Metropolia."

Established in 1956, the paper had a circulation of 35,000. In its early years it published some articles in the Rusyn language using the Latin script, not Cyrillic, but has exclusively used the English language since. Monsignor Basil Shereghy was one of the paper's longtime writers and editors along with Athanasius Pekar. Today its print circulation is 5,000, as well as an online readership at its website. It is a member of the Catholic Press Association.
