= Jan Szczęsny Herburt =

Polish writer and diplomat (1567–1616)

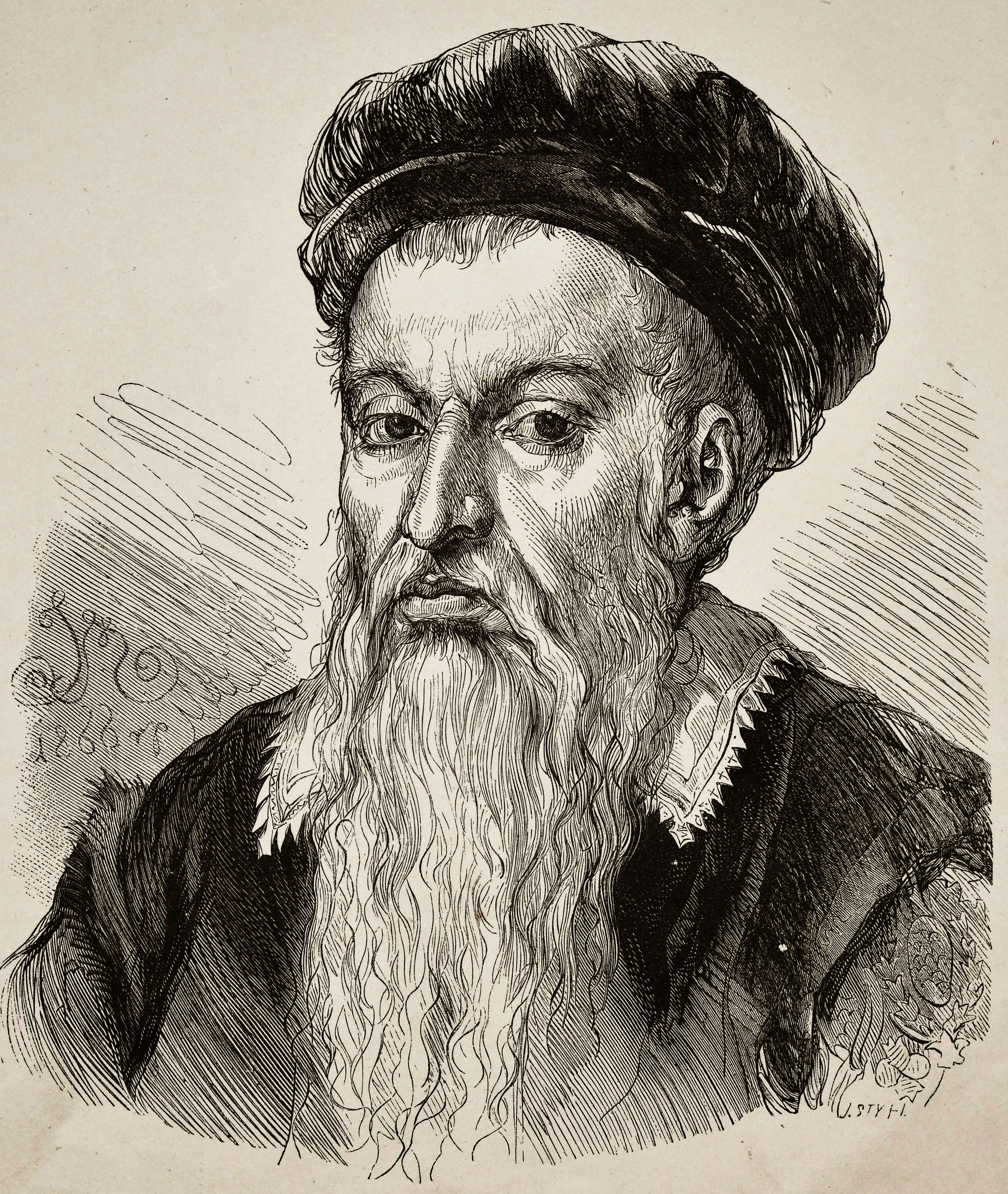
Sketch by Jan Matejko, 1867.

Jan Szczęsny Herburt (12 January 1567 – 31 December 1616) was a Polish political writer, diplomat and a member of the Polish Sejm parliament. An early supporter of Chancellor Jan Zamoyski, he took part in many diplomatic missions, most notably to Sweden, the United Kingdom, the Vatican and the Ottoman Empire. He supported the election of King Sigismund III of Poland to the throne, but then became his adversary and joined the leaders of the infamous Zebrzydowski Rebellion in 1607. As a rebel, he was imprisoned by royalists from 1607 to 1609. Herburt was the author of many rebellion-related and anti-magnate treaties. He was also a founder of the Kudryntsi Castle.

== Life ==
Jan Szczęsny Herburt hailed from a Polonized German-Ruthenian family. His mother Kateryna Drohojowska was Ruthenian. His father Jan Herburt was a historian and lawyer of Moravian origin, whose ancestors had allegedly moved to Ruthenia at the invitation of Leo I of Galicia during the early 14th century. His inheritance included the starostwo of Wisznia.

Herburt received education in Western Europe, and later served as a diplomat in service of his relative, crown chancellor Jan Zamoyski and took part in the suppression of Nalyvaiko Uprising. Himself a Roman Catholic, he opposed the Union of Brest and attempted to protect the Eastern Orthodox minority in the east from Polonization. In 1601 he married Volhynian princess Alżbieta Zasławska, heir of Zasławski and Sanguszko families. This marriage brought Herburt 300,000 złotys of dowry. They settled in Dobromyl, and in 1602 their son Jan Leon was born.

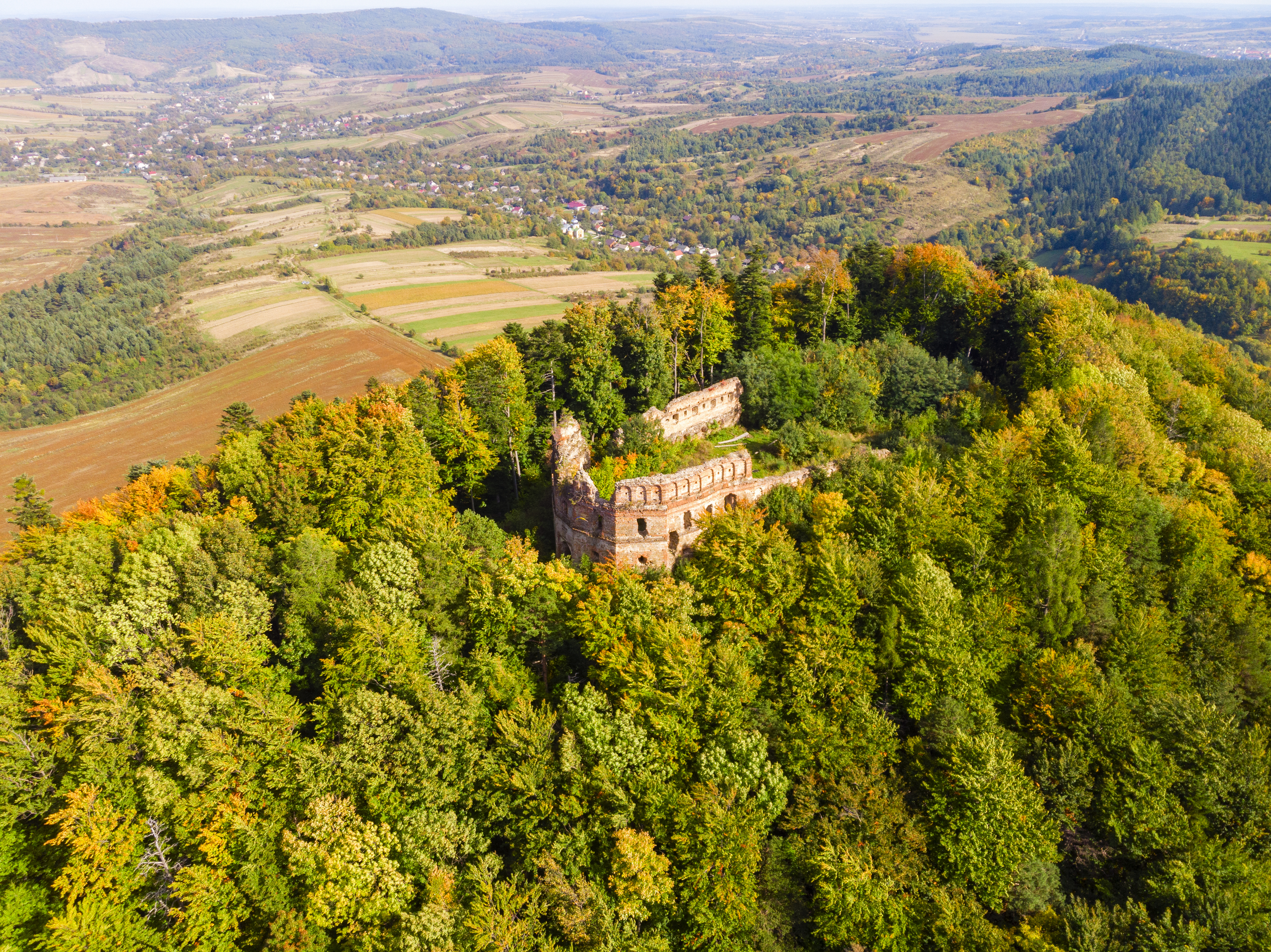
Ruins of Herburt's castle near Dobromyl

In 1607 Herburt became one of the leaders of the Rokosz of Sandomierz along with Mikołaj Zebrzydowski and Jan Radziwiłł. After the defeat at Guzów he was forced to seek refuge at the castle of his father-in-law in Taikury. There Herburt was arrested and imprisoned in Wawel Castle. Following his liberation, Herburt rejoined his wife, but was forced to spend two more years under house arrest. Following his liberation the couple engaged in patronage of the Orthodox Church, establishing the Dobromyl Monastery of Saint Onuphrius. Herburt also sponsored the construction of a church Mostyska, appointed Ruthenians to important positions in his lands and wrote verse in Old Ukrainian.

In his 1613 speech at the sejmik in Wisznia, Herburt publicly supported the rights of Ruthenians and condemned their discrimination in the Polish Kingdom. His anti-Jesuit stance, as well as his initiative of printing the Stanisław Orzechowski annals and Jan Dlugosz chronicles was criticized by Sigismund III who suspended the publication and confiscated his Dobromyl estates. Ruined financially, Herburt engaged in occultism. He died on New Year's Eve in 1616 at the age of 49, leaving his wife with three underage children. Zasławska married for a second time, but died two years later. Their son Jan Leon was forced to enter the monastery in Dobromyl and died in his twenties.

== Bibliography ==
- Bibliografia Literatury Polskiej – Nowy Korbut, t. 2 Piśmiennictwo Staropolskie, Państwowy Instytut Wydawniczy, Warsaw 1964, pages 259-263 (in Polish)
