= Dimitry Pospielovsky =

Canadian historian (1935–2014)

Dimitry Vladimirovich Pospielovsky (13 January 1935 – 12 September 2014) (Russian: Дмитрий Владимирович Поспеловский, transliterated academically as Dmítrij Vladímirovič Pospjélovskij) was a historian, a professor emeritus of history at the University of Western Ontario. He was a prominent researcher in the history of the Russian Orthodox Church.

Pospielovsky was born in 1935 in Ryasniki, a village then in Poland, now in Rivne Oblast, Ukraine.

He also published a number of articles, in English and Russian, on other issues of Russian history, in particular, on workers' movement at the times of Russian Revolutions and on Russian nationalism.

Pospielovsky died in London, Ontario, on 12 September 2014.

== Bibliography ==
- Pravoslavnaia tserkov’ v istorii Rusi, Rossii i SSSR. Moscow (1996) ISBN 5-87507-019-6
  - Orthodox Church in the History of Russia. St Vladimir's Seminary Press (1998), ISBN 0-88141-179-5
- The Russian Church Under the Soviet Regime, 1917-1982 (Volume 1). St. Vladimir's Seminary Press (June, 1984) ISBN 0-88141-015-2
- Soviet Antireligious Campaigns and Persecutions (History of Soviet Atheism in Theory and Practice and the Believers, Vol 2) Palgrave Macmillan (November, 1987), ISBN 0-312-00905-4
- Soviet Studies on the Church and the Believer's Response to Atheism: A History of Soviet Atheism in Theory and Practice and the Believers, Vol 3, Palgrave Macmillan (August, 1988) hardcover: ISBN 0-312-01291-8, paperback: ISBN 0-312-01292-6
- A History of Marxist-Leninist Atheism and Soviet Antireligious Policies, Palgrave Macmillan (December, 1987) ISBN 0-312-38132-8
- Russian police trade unionism: Experiment or provocation? (research monograph), Weidenfeld & Nicolson (1971) ISBN 0-297-00355-0
  - (Expanded and translated into Russian) На путях к рабочему праву. Профсоюзы в России ("On the Roads to the Workers' Right. Trade Unions in Russia"), Posev publishers, 1987
- (with Janis Sapiets and Keith Bosley) Russia's Underground Poets, Praeger (1968) ASIN B000AY6VNQ
- Тоталитаризм и вероисповедание ("Totalitarianism and Faith"). М.: Библейско-богословский институт святого апостола Андрея, (2003) ISBN 5-89647-074-6 (Need a good Russian source)

== Sources ==
- How Stalin Was Resurrecting the Church (Как Сталин церковь возрождал), in Russian, published in Nezavisimaya Gazeta on July 12, 2000
