= Ivaí =

- Municipality
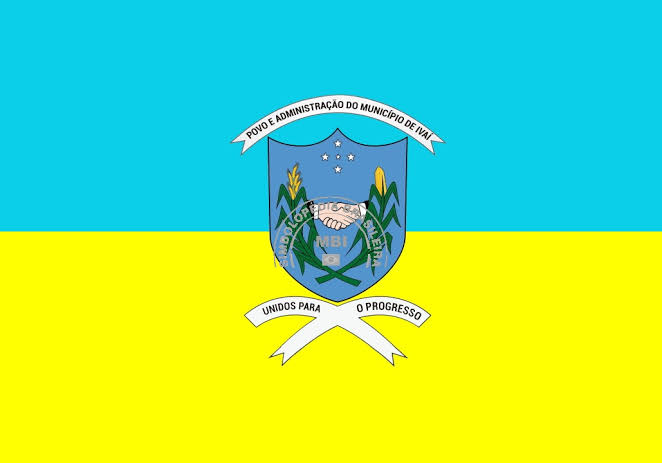
- Flag Coat of arms

- Location in Brazil
- Coordinates: 25°00′39″S 50°51′32″W
- Country: Brazil
- Region: Southern
- State: Paraná
- Mesoregion: Sudeste Paranaense

Population (2020)
  - Total: 13,965
- Time zone: UTC−3 (BRT)

Ivaí is a municipality in the state of Paraná in the Southern Region of Brazil.

The town was established in 1907-1910 and settled by around 2,000 Ukrainian and 1,000 Polish migrants. Later a Basilian monastery with a novitiate and studies of philosophy was established here.

== Climate ==
The climate is highland subtropical climate but always humid (Köppen: Cfb), with an average temperature of 21.6 °C, some lower areas can transit to a humid subtropical climate (Cfa), transition found in the Ivaí Valley.

Climate data for Ivaí, elevation 808 m (2,651 ft), (1981–2010 normals, 1961–present)
Month	Jan	Feb	Mar	Apr	May	Jun	Jul	Aug	Sep	Oct	Nov	Dec	Year
Record high °C (°F)	38.2 (100.8)	35.9 (96.6)	35.8 (96.4)	32.4 (90.3)	30.2 (86.4)	27.9 (82.2)	29.1 (84.4)	31.6 (88.9)	34.9 (94.8)	34.8 (94.6)	37.1 (98.8)	34.8 (94.6)	38.2 (100.8)
Mean daily maximum °C (°F)	28.3 (82.9)	28.2 (82.8)	28.1 (82.6)	25.7 (78.3)	21.9 (71.4)	20.7 (69.3)	21.1 (70.0)	22.9 (73.2)	23.7 (74.7)	25.6 (78.1)	27.2 (81.0)	28.1 (82.6)	25.1 (77.2)
Daily mean °C (°F)	22.0 (71.6)	21.8 (71.2)	21.0 (69.8)	18.9 (66.0)	15.3 (59.5)	13.9 (57.0)	13.8 (56.8)	15.2 (59.4)	16.7 (62.1)	18.8 (65.8)	20.4 (68.7)	21.5 (70.7)	18.3 (64.9)
Mean daily minimum °C (°F)	17.5 (63.5)	17.5 (63.5)	16.3 (61.3)	14.3 (57.7)	10.8 (51.4)	9.4 (48.9)	8.9 (48.0)	9.6 (49.3)	11.5 (52.7)	14.0 (57.2)	15.3 (59.5)	16.6 (61.9)	13.5 (56.3)
Record low °C (°F)	9.0 (48.2)	8.7 (47.7)	3.0 (37.4)	2.1 (35.8)	−4.6 (23.7)	−5.9 (21.4)	−4.4 (24.1)	−6.3 (20.7)	−3.0 (26.6)	2.4 (36.3)	4.6 (40.3)	6.9 (44.4)	−6.3 (20.7)
Average precipitation mm (inches)	202.0 (7.95)	128.7 (5.07)	133.1 (5.24)	114.1 (4.49)	154.8 (6.09)	96.5 (3.80)	118.3 (4.66)	85.8 (3.38)	152.1 (5.99)	176.3 (6.94)	126.6 (4.98)	151.3 (5.96)	1,639.6 (64.55)
Average precipitation days (≥ 1.0 mm)	13	11	9	9	8	6	7	6	9	11	10	12	111
Average relative humidity (%)	79.9	80.6	79.7	81.7	83.7	83.7	80.1	73.3	73.4	75.5	74.5	76.5	78.6
Mean monthly sunshine hours	179.6	169.1	192.4	165.8	164.4	140.4	159.5	197.4	160.6	166.2	191.6	178.1	2,065.1
Source: Instituto Nacional de Meteorologia

== See also ==
- List of municipalities in Paraná
