= Prudentópolis =

Ukrainian-majority municipality in Parana, Brazil

Prudentópolis Прудентополіс (Ukrainian)
- Municipality
- Municipality of Prudentópolis
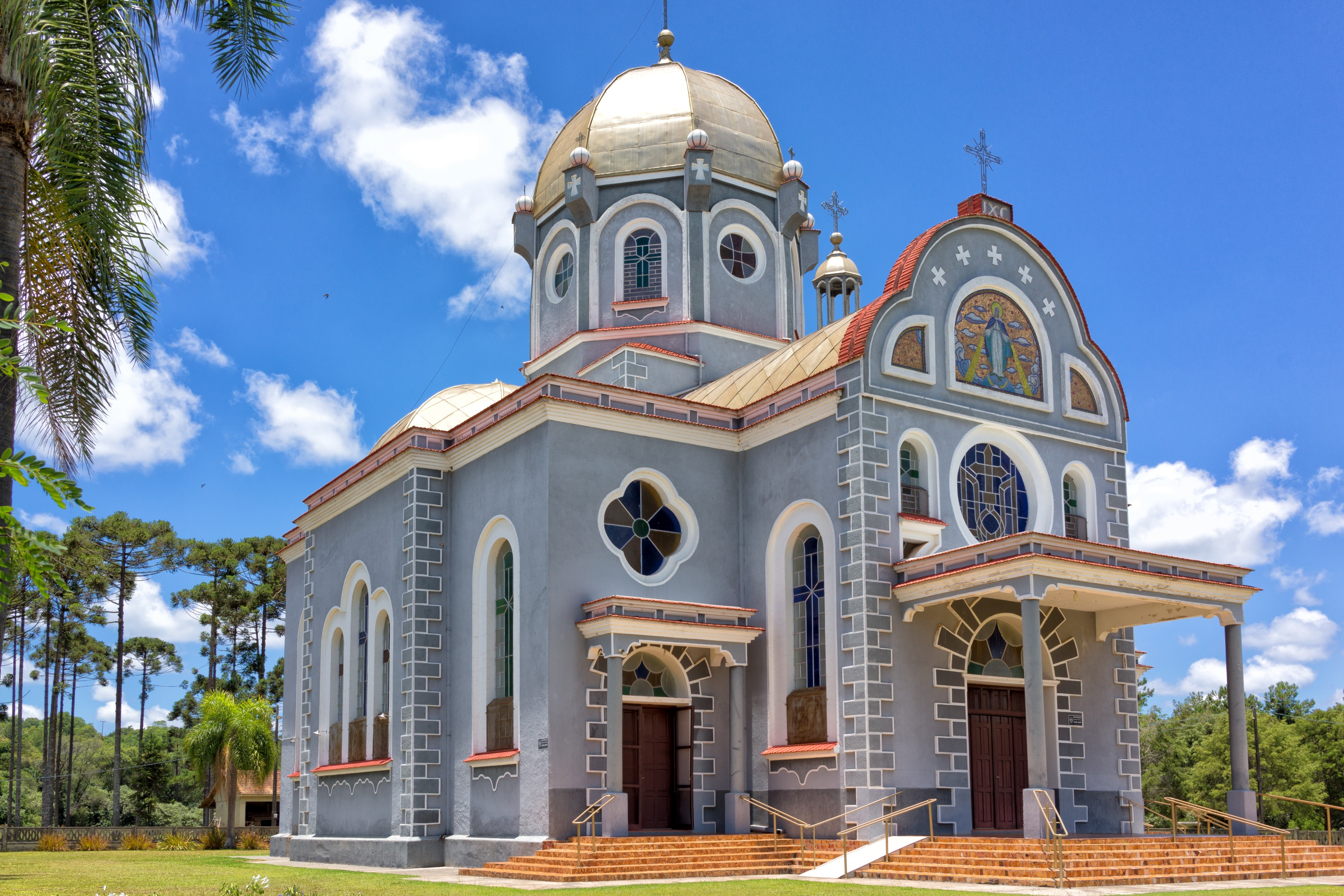
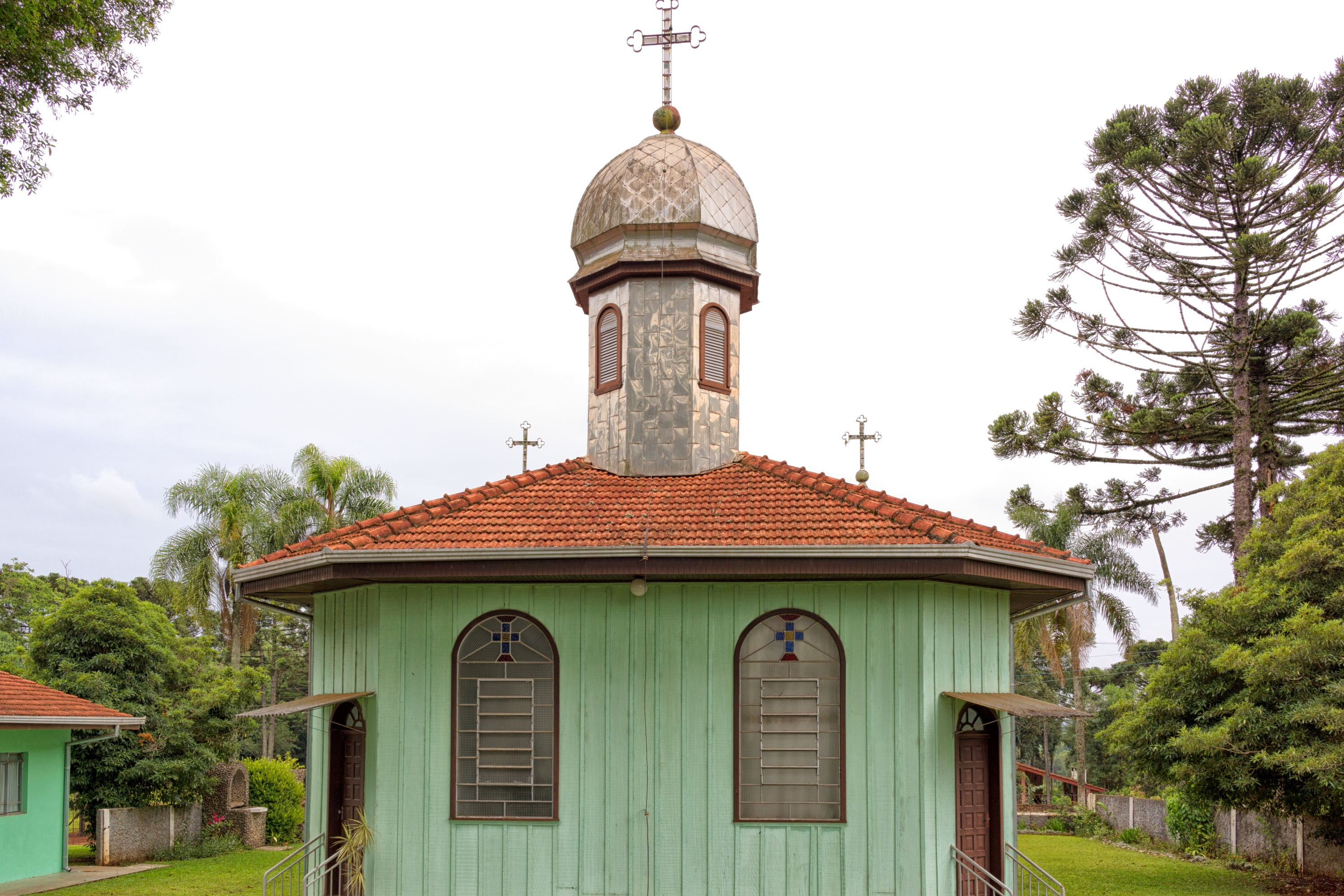
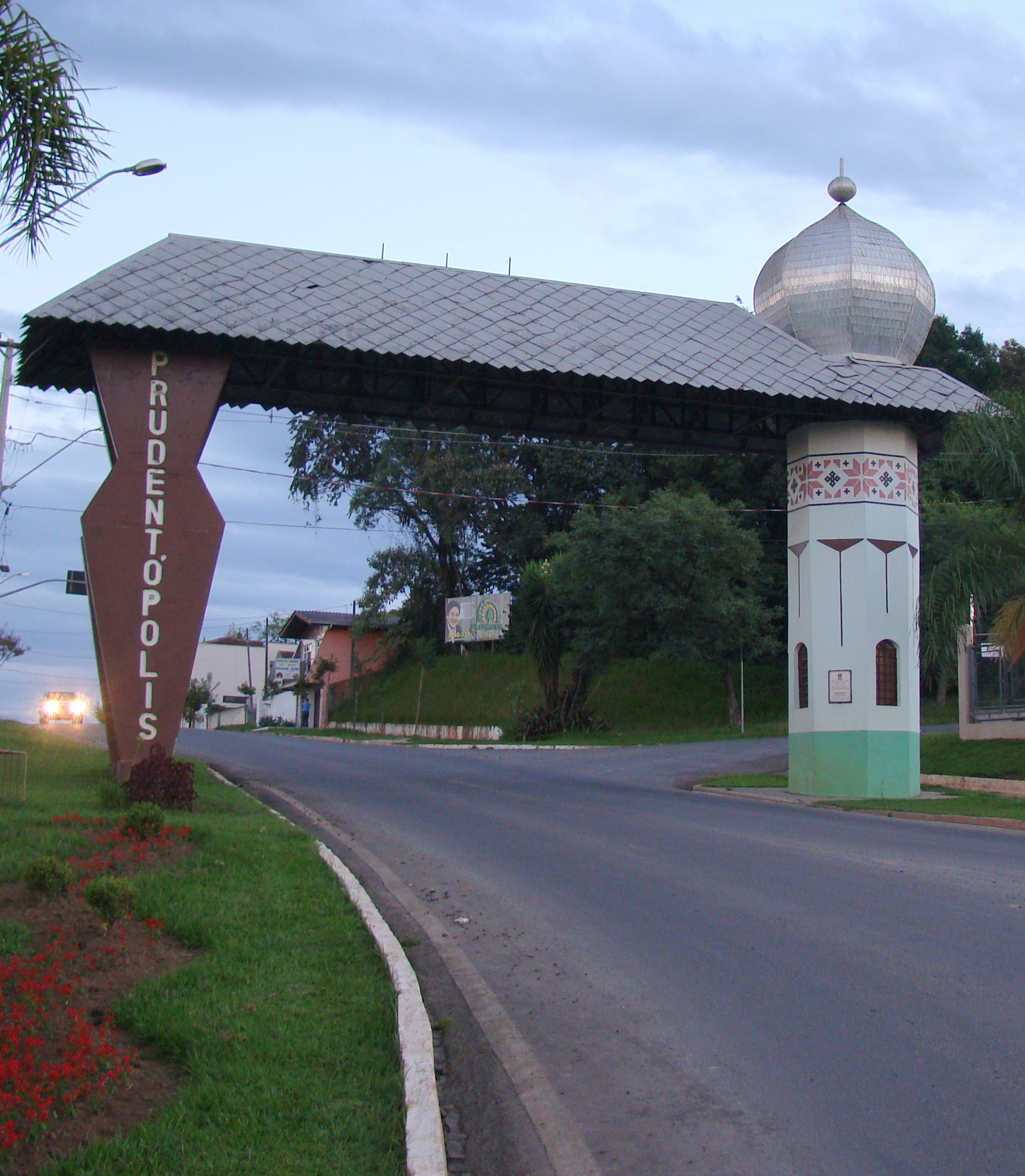
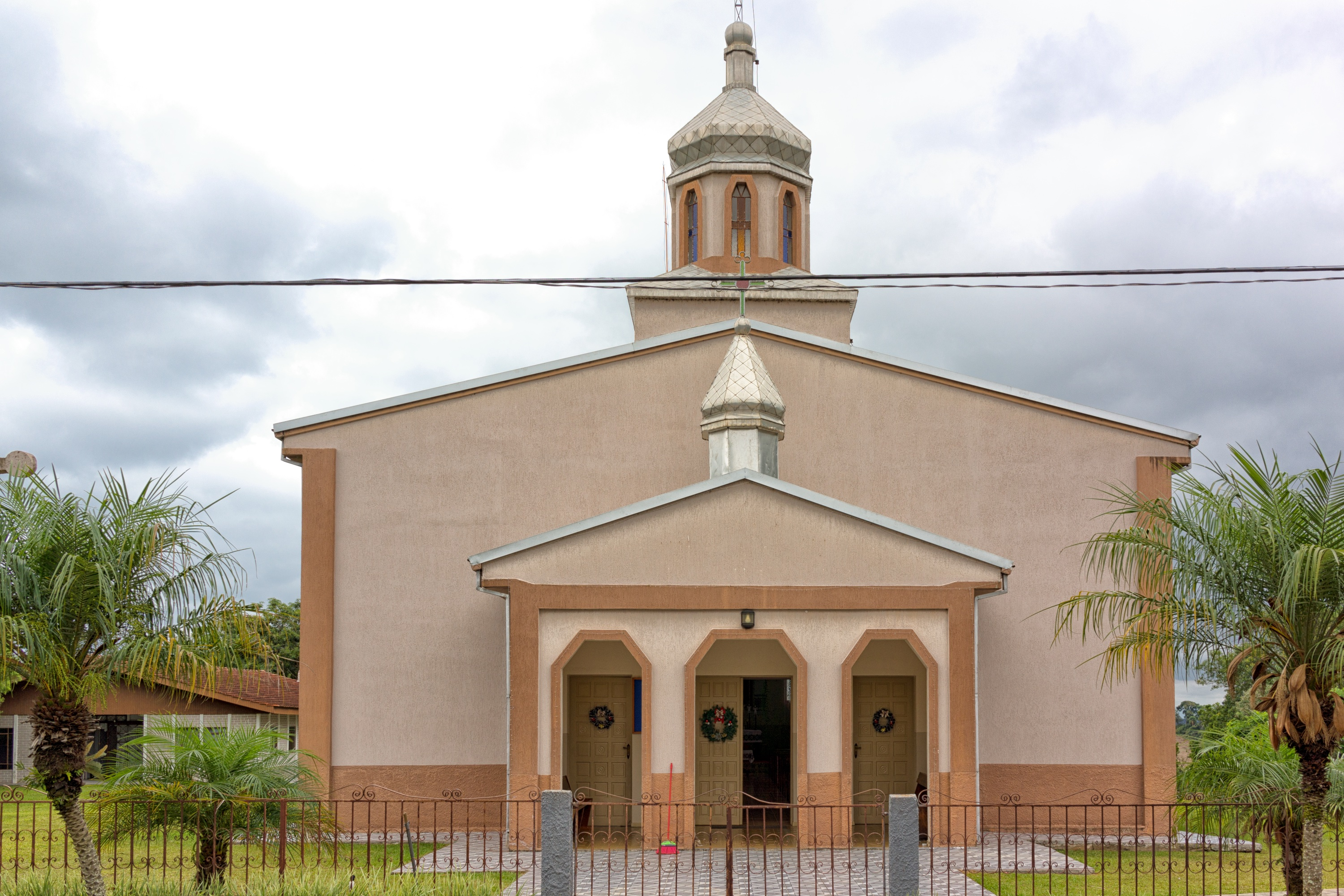
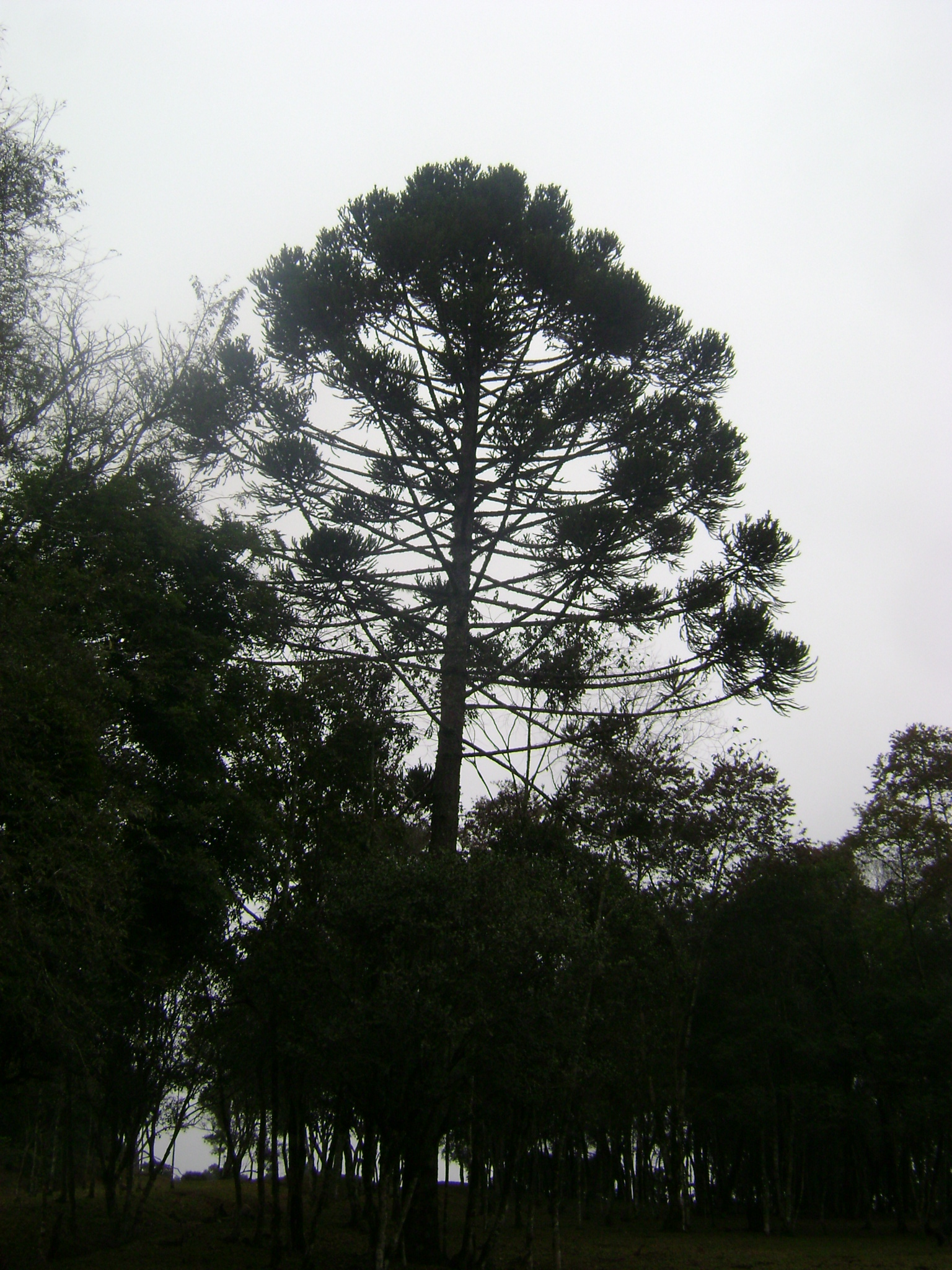
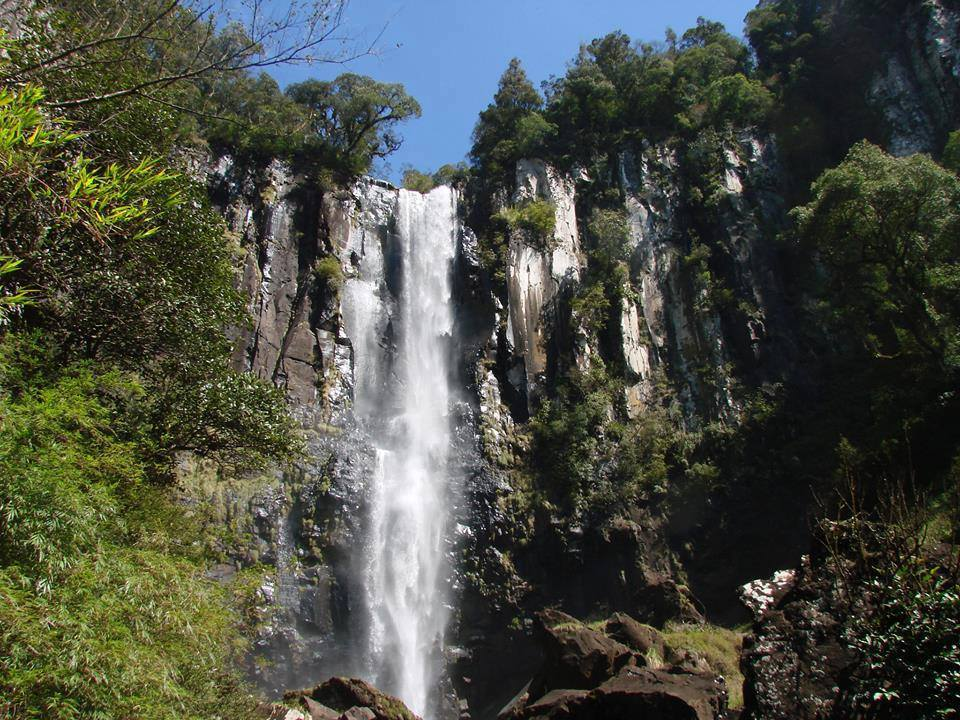

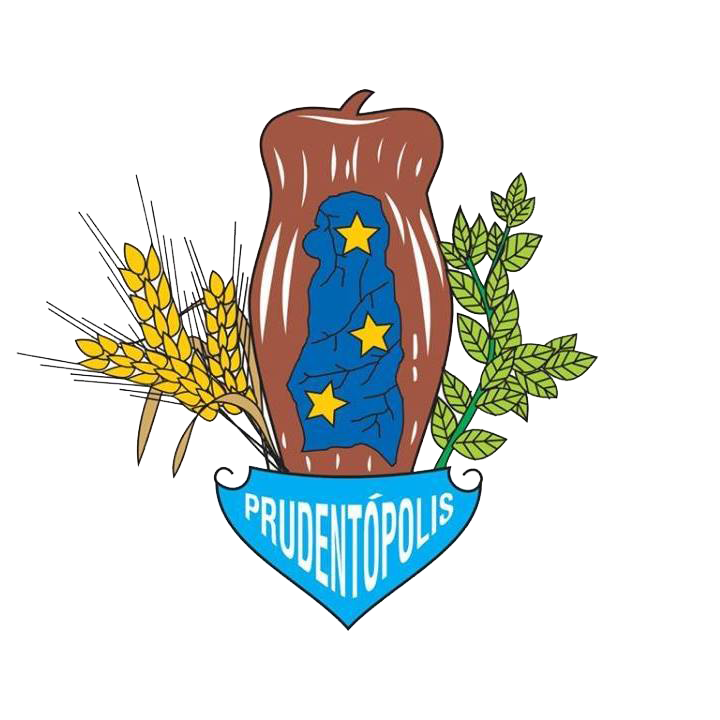
- Flag Coat of arms
- Nickname: Pequena Ucrânia (Little Ukraine)
- Location in Paraná

- Location in Brazil
- Coordinates: 25°12′46″S 50°58′40″W
- Country: Brazil
- Region: South
- State: Paraná
- Mesoregion: Sudeste Paranaense
- Founded: 12 August 1906

Government
  - Mayor: Osnei Stadler (UNIÃO)

Area
  - Total: 2,247.141 km^{2} (867.626 sq mi)
- Elevation: 744 m (2,441 ft)

Population (2022)
  - Total: 49,393
  - Density: 21.980/km^{2} (56.929/sq mi)
- Demonym: prudentopolitano
- Time zone: UTC−3 (BRT)
- Postal code: 84400-000
- HDI (2010): 0.676 – medium
- Website: Official website

Prudentópolis (Brazilian Portuguese: [pɾudẽˈtɔpolis]; Ukrainian: Прудентополіс, romanized: Prudentopolis) is a Brazilian municipality in the state of Paraná, in Southern Brazil. As of 2022, it had a population of 49,393 people.

It is the center of the Ukrainian community in Brazil. The Ukrainian city Ternopil is the sister city to Prudentópolis.

Moreover, the town is surrounded by 100 waterfalls, which also attracts many tourists.

== History ==
In 1882, the project of the construction of roads in central Paraná attracted the first families to the region. Firmo Mendes de Queiroz, descended from bandeirantes, settled there, living on agriculture. He built a chapel, giving birth to a place called "Vilinha" (Little Village) by its inhabitants. In 1894, the government decided to colonize the region of São João do Capanema. Cândido Ferreira de Abreu, the owner of this colony, decided to change its name to Prudentópolis, in honor to Brazilian president Prudente de Morais. In 1895, to settle this region, 1,500 Ukrainian families, about 8,000 people, came to Prudentópolis. This immigration continued until the 1920s.

Most of the immigrants were from the Ternopil Oblast of Ukraine, and today the Ukrainian city Ternopil is sister city of Prudentópolis.

== Population ==
Nowadays, Prudentópolis is home to the largest population of Ukrainian descent in Brazil (75% of the municipality's inhabitants). Other ethnic groups that make up its population are Italians, Poles and Germans.

The Ukrainian culture is still preserved by its inhabitants: the Ukrainian language is taught in local schools and used a liturgical language and there are typically Ukrainian constructions, it is also one of the two official languages alongside Portuguese.

=== Religion ===
The Ukrainian Catholic particular church, which used the Byzantine Rite in Ukrainian language, has there the Catedral Ucraniana Nossa Senhora da Imaculada Conceição, cathedral episcopal see of an eparchy (diocese), the Ukrainian Catholic Eparchy of Imaculada Conceição in Prudentópolis. It is (the sole) suffragan of the Metropolitan Ukrainian Catholic Archeparchy of São João Batista em Curitiba, who heads the only proper Eastern rite ecclesiastical province in Brazil.

== Sources ==
- GigaCatholic on the Ukrainian Catholic Eparchy
