= Order of Saint Basil the Great =

Monastic religious order of the Greek Catholic Churches

- Latin: Ordo Sancti Basilii Magni
- Abbreviation: OSBM
- Formation: 20 August 1631 (395 years ago)
- Founder: Saint Josaphat Kuntsevych
- Type: Monastic order of pontifical right (for men)
- Members: 484 (338 priests) (2025)
- Superior General: Robert Lysseiko, OSBM
- Parent organization: Greek Catholic Church

The Order of Saint Basil the Great (Ukrainian: Чин Святого Василія Великого, romanized: Chyn Sviatoho Vasyliia Velykoho; Latin: Ordo Sancti Basilii Magni, abbreviated OSBM), also known as the Basilian Order of Saint Josaphat, is a Greek Catholic monastic order of pontifical right that works actively among Ukrainian Catholics and other Greek Catholic churches in central and Eastern Europe. The order received approbation on 20 August 1631 and is based at the Monastery of the Holy Trinity, Vilnius.

== History ==
=== Orthodox traditions ===
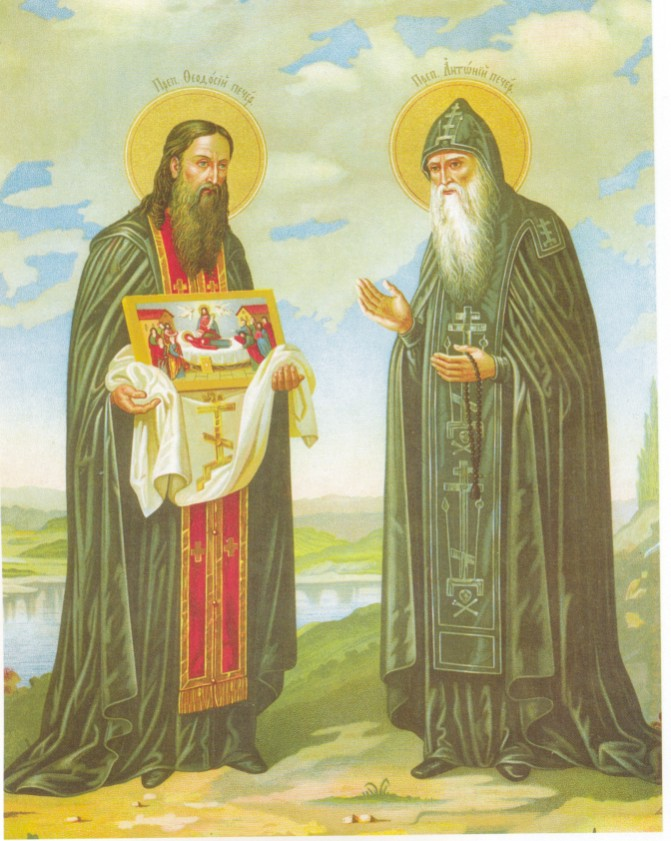
Sts. Anthony and Theodosius

The Basilian Order originates from the tradition of Orthodox monasticism in the Ruthenian lands of the Kingdom of Poland and the Grand Duchy of Lithuania. Its precursors were St. Anthony and his disciple St. Theodosius, founders of the monasteries in the Pechersk Lavra in the 10th century, which followed the rules of St. Basil the Great and St. Theodore the Studite. The lavra model was adopted by other monastic communities in Ruthenian lands, combining eremitic and cenobitic forms of life. Unlike monks of the Latin Rite, they did not form congregations but operated independently, subject only to local bishops.

They also generally did not engage in educational, charitable, or pastoral activities, and few among them were priests. The monasteries, however, had immense cultural significance and served as the intellectual and spiritual backbone of the Orthodox Church. Because of their black habits, the monks were called chernets ("black monks") of the Rule of St. Basil, or simply "Basilians" since the mid of the 14th century.

=== Union of Brest and monastic reform ===
In the second half of the 16th century, the Orthodox Church in the Polish-Lithuanian lands experienced a crisis, most evident in the decline of monastic life and the weakening of discipline. Many Orthodox clergy saw the solution to these problems in renewing union with the Latin Church. Representatives of three monasteries from Bratslav, Lavryshiv and Minsk took part in the Synod of Brest in 1596, which led to the union. However, delegates from ten other important monasteries participated in the anti-synod. The division within the Christian of Greek tradition had a profound impact on the state of the monasteries, which repeatedly changed their confessional affiliation.

=== Development ===
At the Synod of Novogrudok in 1617, the Congregation of the Holy Trinity was established, bringing together all Uniate monasteries. At that time, there were five monasteries in Vilnius, Novogrudok, Minsk, Zhyrovichy and Byten, with 60 monks in total. The order was approved in 1631 by Pope Urban VIII. As the Union expanded, the number of monasteries within the congregation also increased. Not all monasteries that accepted the Union, however, joined the congregation; this mainly concerned those located in the Crown, which differed from the Lithuanian ones in their greater poverty, simpler clothing, longer beards and generally lower intellectual level of the monks. In 1739, a new Congregation of the Protection of the Blessed Virgin Mary was founded for monasteries in the Kingdom of Poland. It was labelled the "Ruthenian", "Crown", or "Polish" congregation, to distinguish it from the older Lithuanian one.

Claims to precedence by the Lithuanian province led to the unification of both congregations into the Ruthenian Order of Saint Basil the Great (Ordo Sancti Basilii Magni Ruthenorum) by Pope Benedict XIV in 1744, with the former congregations becoming provinces. The archimandry of Supraśl, together with its residences in Warsaw and Kuźnica, remained outside the order. At the time of the union, the order comprised 195 monasteries and 1,145 monks.

The Order of Saint Basil the Great spread and flourished across modern-day Belarus and Ukraine, playing a key role in the education both of laity and clergy while helping preserve the distinctiveness of Ruthenian culture in the predominantly Polish and Roman Catholic Polish–Lithuanian Commonwealth, until the partitions of Poland at the end of the 18th century. In 1772, the Order had over 200 monasteries and over 1,000 monks, six seminaries, 20 schools and colleges, and four printing houses.

=== Suppression in Russia ===
In the last years of the 18th century, most of the Ruthenian lands came under the Russian Empire, where the Order along with the whole Ruthenian Church was persecuted. Eventually the monasteries were subjected to the Russian Orthodox Church. A small part of modern Ukraine came under Austrian rule where the Ruthenian Church fared much better. However, the Order suffered under the policies of Emperor Joseph II directed against all religious orders. In the second half of the 19th century, efforts were undertaken to renew the Order. By 1882, it was reduced to just 60 monks in 14 monasteries. With permission from Pope Leo XIII, the Basilian Constitution was updated with help from the Society of Jesus starting with the Dobromyl Monastery, by which it became less sedentary and more missionary, among other things allowing the monks to work with the Ukrainian diaspora overseas. The Basilians reached Brazil (1897), Canada (1902), the United States (1907), and Argentina (1934). New provinces were established covering Transcarpathia, Hungary, and Yugoslavia and Romania. By 1939, the number of monks rose to over 650 and in 1944, the Order purchased the John E. Aldred Estate at Lattingtown, New York, now known as St. Josaphat's Monastery.

Following the Second World War, the Soviet Union entered further into Europe and forced the Ukrainian Greek Catholic Church underground. In all Soviet-controlled territories, only a single Basilian monastery was left open, in the Polish capital of Warsaw. Nonetheless, the Order survived among the Ukrainian diaspora in the free world, in communist Yugoslavia where the regime was relatively benign, and in Ukraine itself where the monks secretly prayed and catechized.

=== Revival ===
After the collapse of the Soviet Union, the Order was reestablished in independent Ukraine and other Central and Eastern European countries such as Hungary, Romania, Slovakia and Portugal. Some old monasteries have since been restored and new ones established. In 2001,there were over 600 monks, 300 of whom were in Ukraine.

== Saints, Blesseds, and other holy people ==
Saints

- Josaphat Kuntsevych (c. 1580 – 12 November 1623), Archeparch of Polotsk, founder of the order, and martyr, canonized on 29 June 1867

Blesseds

- Severian Baranyk (18 July 1889 - c. June 1941), Priest and Martyr of Ukraine, beatified on 27 June 2001
- Yakym Senkivskyi (2 May 1896 – 29 June 1941), Priest and Martyr of Ukraine, beatified on 27 June 2001
- Vitaliy Bayrak (24 February 1907 – 21 April 1946), Priest and Martyr of Ukraine, beatified on 27 June 2001
- Josaphat Kotsylovsky (3 March 1876 - 17 November 1947), Eparch of Przemyśl and Martyr of Ukraine, beatified on 27 June 2001
- Pavel Peter Gojdič (17 July 1888 — 17 July 1960), Eparch of Prešov and Martyr, beatified on 4 November 2001

Venerables

- Andrey Sheptytsky (29 July 1865 – 1 November 1944) Archbishop of Lviv of the Ukrainians and Confessor of the Faith, declared Venerable on 16 July 2015

Servants of God

- Ivan (Eremiya) Lomnitskyi (8 February 1860 - 3 July 1916), priest and cofounder of the Sisters Servants of Mary Immaculate of the Ukrainian Greek Catholic Rite, declared Servant of God in 2008
- Gabriel (Cristóforo) Myskiw (21 May 1905 - 7 June 1973), priest and founder of the Secular Institute of the Catechists of the Sacred Heart of Jesus
- Semyon (Severian) Hnatyuk (28 December 1918 - 23 March 1994), priest
- Mihai Neamţu (13 October 1924 - 23 June 2000), Romanian professed religious

== Notable Basilians ==
- Emellia Prokopik, nun of the Catholic Church in Ukraine, and former Superior General
- Symeon of Polotsk, poet, dramatist, churchman, and enlightener
- Sebastian Sabol, poet, writer, recipient of All-Ukrainian Literary Prize
- Athanasius Pekar, church historian, pastor, seminary professor in the United States
- Josaphat Jean, french canadian priest, diplomat, translator

== See also ==
- Basilian monks
- Congregation of St. Basil

== Bibliography ==
- Lorens, Beata (2014). Bazylianie prowincji koronnej w latach 1743–1780. Rzeszów.
