= Maroun Ammar =

Lebanese bishop

- Eparch of Sidon
- Native name: مارون عمار
- Church: Maronite Church
- Diocese: Eparchy of Sidon
- Appointed: 17 June 2017
- Predecessor: Elias Nassar
- Previous posts: Apostolic Administrator of Sidon (2017); Titular Eparch of Canatha (2012-2017); Auxiliary Eparch of Joubbé, Sarba and Jounieh (2012-2017)

Orders
- Ordination: 17 September 1983
- Consecration: 28 July 2012 by Bechara Boutros al-Rahi

Personal details
- Born: 10 February 1956 (age 70) Hajjeh, South Governorate, Lebanon

Maroun Ammar (born 10 February 1956 in Hajjéh, Lebanon) is Bishop of the Maronite Catholic Eparchy of Sidon (Saida).

== Life ==
Ammar was born in southern Lebanon on 10 February 1956; he studied at the minor seminary of Ghazir and the “Saint Esprit” University of Kaslik.

He received his priestly ordination on 17 September 1983.

He served at Alma Chaab in Tiro and at the Saint Médard parish in Paris, before being appointed as president of the Maronite Tribunal of Haifa in Israel in 1996.

Pope Benedict XVI confirmed his appointment as auxiliary bishop of the Maronite Catholic Eparchy of Joubbé, Sarba and Jounieh to Joubbé and as Titular Bishop of Canatha on 16 June 2012. Maronite Patriarch of Antioch, Cardinal Bechara Boutros al-Rahi, OMM ordained him on 28 July of the same year to the episcopate. His co-consecrators were Samir Mazloum, retired Curial Bishop of Antioch, Guy-Paul Noujaim, Emeritus Curia Bishop in Joubbé, Sarba and Jounieh, Paul Youssef Matar, Archeparch of Beirut, Francis Némé Baïssari, Emeritus Auxiliary Bishop in Joubbé, Sarba and Jounieh, Paul Nabil El-Sayah, Curial Bishop of Antioch, Joseph Mohsen Béchara, Emeritus Archeparch of Antelias, Simon Atallah, OAM, Bishop of Baalbek-Deir El-Ahmar, François Eid, OMM, procurator of the Maronite Patriarch at the Holy See, Edgard Madi, Eparch of Nossa Senhora do Líbano em São Paulo, and Michel Aoun, Bishop of Byblos.

In June 2017, he was appointed as Bishop of Saida (Sidon). He was consecrated by Cardinal al-Rahi. His principal co-consecrators were Edgard Madi, Maronite Bishop of São Paulo and Chucrallah-Nabil El-Hage, Archeparch of Tyre, who is also from Hajjéh.

In December 2020, Ammar and the retired el-Hage were co-consecrators when Charbel Abdallah - who is also from Hajjéh - was consecrated by al-Rahi as el-Hage's successor in Tyre.
