= Sérgio de Deus Borges =

Brazilian priest

- Bishop of Roman Catholic Diocese of Foz do Iguaçu
- Church: Roman Catholic Church
- Appointed: 27 June 2012
- Successor: Incumbent
- Other post: Apostolic Administrator of Melkite Greek Catholic Eparchy of Nossa Senhora do Paraíso em São Paulo (2018–2019)

Orders
- Ordination: 6 February 1993 (Priest)
- Consecration: 18 August 2012 (Bishop) by Getúlio Teixeira Guimarães

Personal details
- Born: Sérgio de Deus Borges; 4 September 1966 (age 60) Alfredo Wagner, Brazil

Coat of arms of Sérgio de Deus Borges.

Bishop Sérgio de Deus Borges (born 4 September 1966) is a Brazilian Roman Catholic prelate and professor, who served as an Auxiliary bishop of the Roman Catholic Archdiocese of São Paulo and the Titular Bishop of Gergis since 27 June 2012.

He was also an Apostolic Administrator of the Melkite Greek Catholic Eparchy of Nossa Senhora do Paraíso em São Paulo from 23 May 2018 until 17 June 2019. He was then appointed Bishop of Foz do Iguaçu, Parana.

== Life ==
Bishop Borges was born in a Roman Catholic family in Alfredo Wagner, Santa Catarina. After graduation of the school education, he subsequently joined the Theological Institute Paul VI in Londrina. He was ordained as priest on February 6, 1993, for the Roman Catholic Diocese of Cornélio Procópio after completed his philosophical and theological study. Also, he graduated from the Universidade Luterana do Brasil with a licentiate degree in pedagogy, the Pontifical Lateran University in Rome, the Università Cattolica del Sacro Cuore in Rome and the Pontifical Catholic University of Argentina in Buenos Aires with a Doctor of Canon Law degree.

After his ordination he served as a parish priest in the different localities of his diocese and was a Rector of the Major Theological Seminary of São José (2000–2011). In the same time he was a professor of the Canon Law in the diffenet Catholic educational institutes and worked as a judicial vicar. From 2011 he also is a President of the Brazilian Society of Canonists. He taught Canon law at the Pontifical Catholic University of Paraná, where he also directed the course of theology.

On June 27, 2012, he was appointed by the Pope Benedict XVI as the Auxiliary Bishop of the Roman Catholic Archdiocese of São Paulo and Titular Bishop of Gergis. On August 18, 2012, he was consecrated as bishop by Bishop Getúlio Teixeira Guimarães and other prelates of the Roman Catholic Church. He had responsibility as a Vicar Episcopal for the Region of Santana.

On May 23, 2018, he was appointed by the Pope Francis as an Apostolic Administrator of the then vacant Eastern Catholic circumscription - Melkite Greek Catholic Eparchy of Nossa Senhora do Paraíso em São Paulo. This and his tenure as Auxiliary Bishop ended due to appointment, July 17, 2019 as Bishop of Foz do Iguaçu, Parana.

Catholic Church titles
Preceded by Jurij Bizjak	Titular Bishop of Gergis; 2012–present	Succeeded by Incumbent
Preceded by Joseph Gébara	Apostolic Administrator of Melkite Catholic Eparchy of Nossa Senhora do Paraíso em São Paulo; 2018–2019	Succeeded by Georges Khoury
