= Archeparchy of Tyre =

Archeparchy of Tyre may refer to:

- Melkite Greek Catholic Archeparchy of Tyre
- Maronite Catholic Archeparchy of Tyre
