= Hajjeh, Lebanon =

Hajjeh
- Municipality
- الحجة
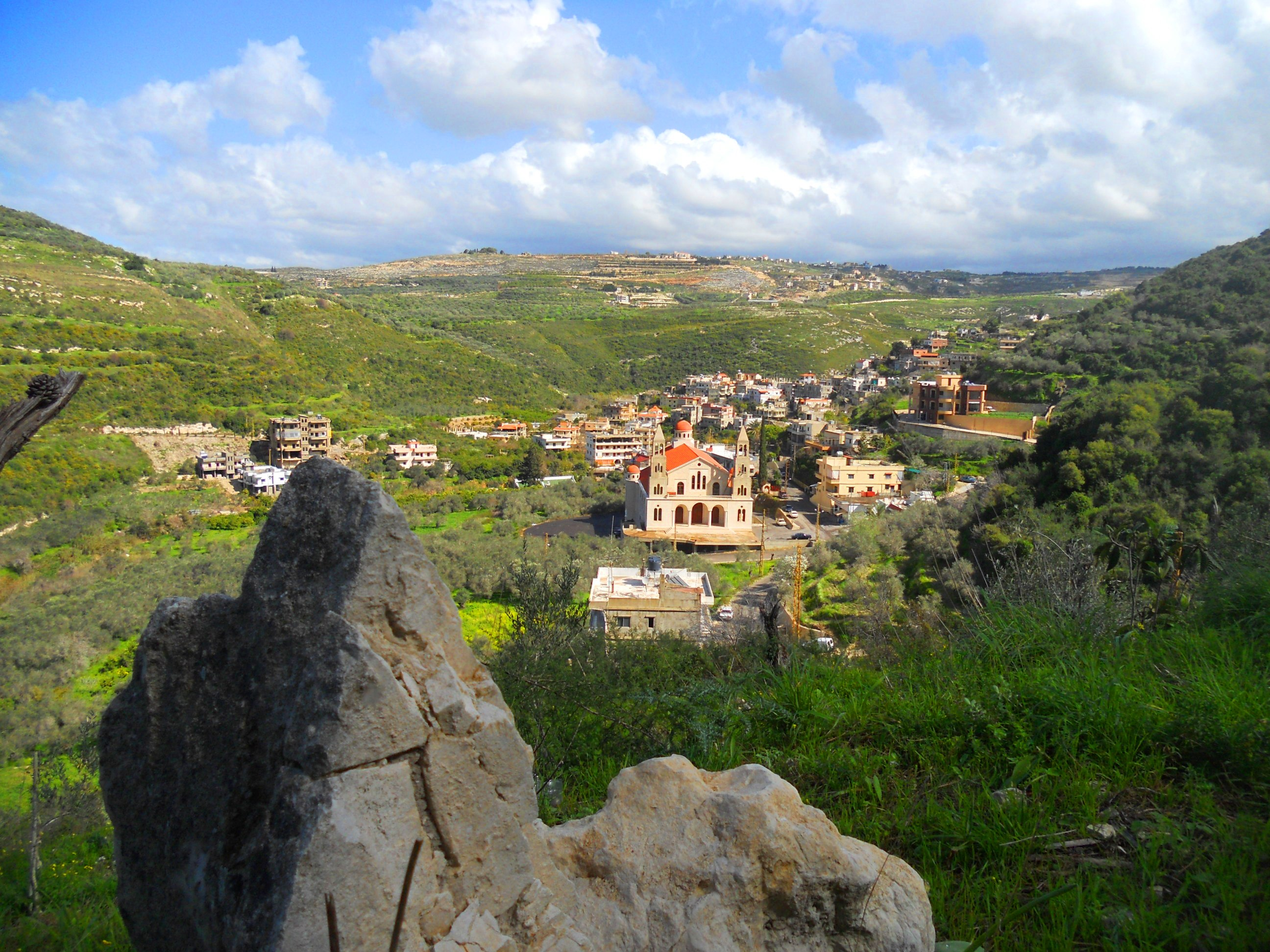

- Location in Lebanon
- Coordinates: 33°28′41.4″N 35°22′51.5″E
- Country: Lebanon
- Governorate: South Governorate
- District: Sidon

Area
  - Total: 270 ha (670 acres)
- Elevation: 90 m (300 ft)
  - Summer (DST): EET

Hajjeh (Levantine Arabic: الحجة, romanized: al-Ḥajjeh, also transliterated Hajje, Hajjeh, al-Hejjeh, al-Hijjeh, Alhaja, Hadja) is a municipality located at the Zahrani River in the Sidon District (Saida Caza) of the South Governorate in Lebanon, about 56 kilometers South of the national capital Beirut.

== History ==
In 1875 Victor Guérin found the village to be located on the southern part of a valley, and inhabited by 350 Maronites.

In June 2003, Chucrallah-Nabil El-Hage - who was born in Hajjeh in 1943 - was elected Archbishop of the Maronite Catholic Archeparchy of Tyre. In September of that year he was confirmed by the Holy See and his ordaination took place on 29 November 2003.

In the July 2006 Lebanon War between Israel and Hezbollah the town bridge was destroyed in bombardments by the Israeli Air Force (IAF).

In November 2020, the Synod of Bishops of the Maronite Catholic Patriarchate of Antioch announced that it accepted El-Hage's age-related resignation and that it had elected Charbel Abdallah as his successor. Abdallah was born in 1967 and hails from Hajjeh as well.

== Demographics ==
In 2014 Christians made up 96.26% of registered voters in Hajjeh. 89% of the voters were Maronite Catholics.

== Notable people ==
- Chucrallah-Nabil El-Hage (b. 1943)
- Maroun Ammar (b. 1956)
- Charbel Abdallah (b. 1967)

== Bibliography ==
- Guérin, V. (1880). Description Géographique Historique et Archéologique de la Palestine (in French). Vol. 3: Galilee, pt. 2. Paris: L'Imprimerie Nationale.
