= George Khoury (bishop) =

Melkite Greek Catholic bishops

Bishop George Khoury
- Melkite Greek Catholic Eparchy of Nossa Senhora do Paraíso em São Paulo
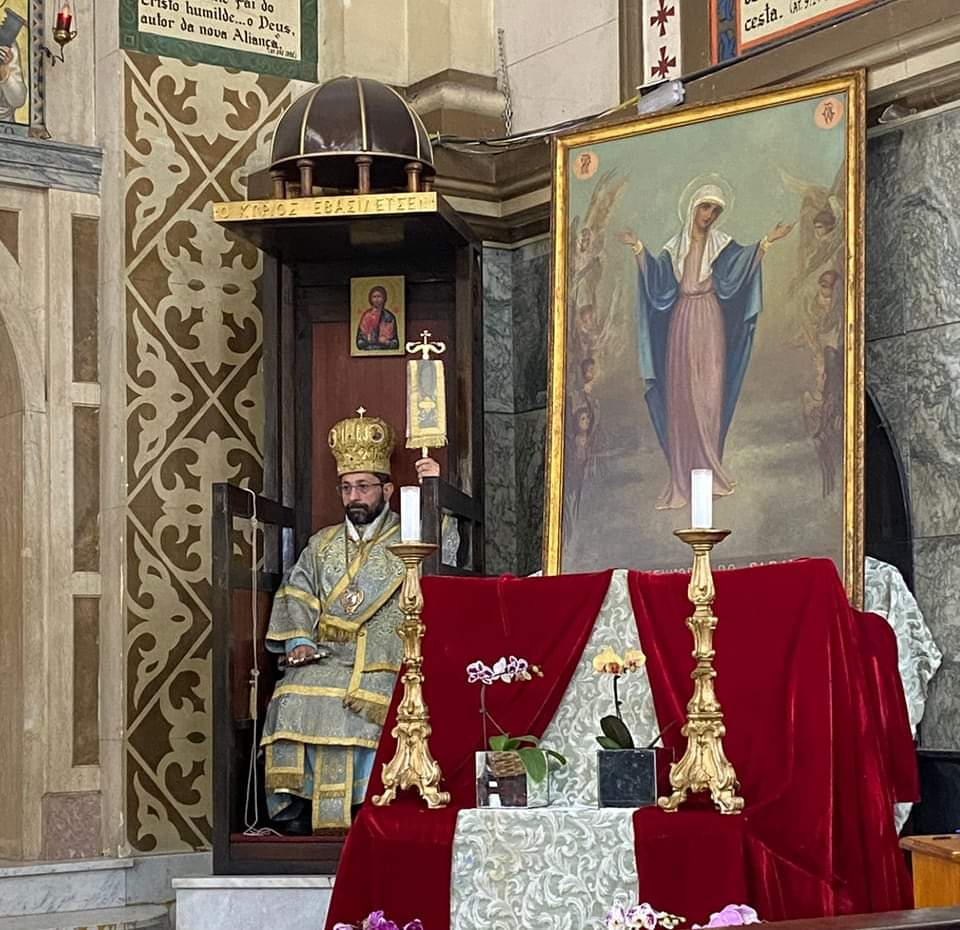
- Church: Melkite Greek Catholic Church
- See: Eparchate of Our Lady of the Paradise in São Paulo
- In office: 2019 - present
- Predecessor: Joseph Gébara

Orders
- Ordination: 14 April 1999 by Fares Maakaroun
- Consecration: 25 August 2019

Personal details
- Born: George Toufik Khoury; 14 February 1970 Safita, Tartus Governorate, Syria

George Khoury (born 14 February 1970) is the current eparch of the Eparchy of Our Lady of the Paradise in São Paulo of Greek Melkites.

== Biography ==
George Khoury was born in Tartus, Syria, on 14 February 1970.

He attended Al-Baath University-Homs; he graduated in 1992 and worked as an English language teacher in Safita for two years before joining the convent of São Paulo.

In 1998 he was ordained deacon and on 14 April 1999 he was ordained to the priesthood.

On 17 June 2019 he was named eparch to the Eparchy of Our Lady of the Paradise in São Paulo.
