= Elias Coueter =

Brazilian bishop (1896–1985)

- Eparch of Nossa Senhora do Paraíso em São Paulo
- Native name: الياس كويتر
- Church: Catholic Church
- Diocese: Eparchy of Nossa Senhora do Paraíso em São Paulo
- In office: 29 November 1971 – 22 June 1978
- Predecessor: Eparchy erected
- Successor: Spiridon Mattar
- Previous posts: Titular Bishop of Taua (1960-1971); Auxiliary Eparch of Brazil of the Eastern Rite (1960-1971)

Orders
- Ordination: 20 July 1925
- Consecration: 5 February 1961 by Elias Zoghby

Personal details
- Born: 15 August 1896 Damascus, Vilayet of Syria, Ottoman Empire
- Died: 16 June 1985 (aged 88) São Paulo, São Paulo, Brazil

Elias Coueter (15 August 1896, Damascus – 16 June 1985) was bishop of the Melkite Greek Catholic Church and first eparch of the Melkite Greek Catholic Eparchy of Nossa Senhora do Paraíso em São Paulo for all Melkites in Brazil. The bishop's seat is located in São Paulo.

== Early years ==
Elias Coueter was the son of Antoun Saada Coueter and his wife Wasilla and grew up in Damascus. At the age of eleven, he entered the seminary of Saint Anne in Jerusalem, which is run by the White Fathers. Between 1914 and 1918 all seminaries had to cease operations, and the seminarians returned to their hometowns. After World War I, Coueter continued his education in Damascus and studied philosophy and theology. On 20 July 1925, he was ordained a priest and knew then pastoral and pastoral activities in Beirut, Damascus and Cairo. For some time he worked at the sister school of the Sisters of Besançon ( Besançon Ecole) as chaplain and director of Arab Studies. In 1936 he was sent as an Archimandrite in the Melkite parish to Detroit (USA).

== Bishop of Brazil ==
In 1939, Elias Coueter was envoyed to Brazil, where he continued the development of the communities. First, he established a Melkite parish in the Roman Catholic Archdiocese of São Sebastião do Rio de Janeiro and received approval in a Roman Catholic church in Rio de Janeiro worship to celebrate in the Byzantine Rite. From this church he was also an office and accommodation. He organized the construction of its own parish church, the church of Saint Basil, that was first built in 1941 and in 1946 handed over by the Archbishop of the Melkite Church. By 1951 the community had from Melkites, Maronites, Ukrainian Catholics, Russian Greek Catholics, Romanian Greek Catholics and Syriac Catholics together set, significantly increased. In the same period, the municipality of Paraíso in São Paulo had also increased, according to her the eparchy was later to be named. The Archbishop Jaime de Barros Camara of Rio de Janeiro (1943-1971) appointed him in 1951 with the approval of the Holy See and the Melkite Patriarch of Antioch Maximos IV Sayegh Vicar General and entrusted him with the responsibility for all Melkite Christians in Brazil. On 25 November 1960, Coueter was appointed Titular Bishop of Taua and appointed Auxiliary Bishop of the Byzantine Catholics in Brazil. The episcopal ordination took place on 5 February 1961, by Archbishop Elias Zoghby of Baalbek (Lebanon). His co-consecrators were the Bishop Paulo Rolim Loureiro of Mogi das Cruzes and the Bishop José Romão Martenetz, OSBM. Shortly after his episcopal appointment Coueter participated in the last two sessions of the II Vatican Council.

Pope Paul VI by decree of 1972 gave the Melkite Greek Catholic Church its own bishopric in Brazil. Elias Coueter became the first Bishop for all Melkites of the Byzantine Rite in Brazil with the new Melkite Greek Catholic Eparchy of Nossa Senhora do Paraíso em São Paulo. He held the post for six years.

In 1977, he handed in his resignation due to age and became professor emeritus on 22 June 1978. He was retired bishop of the Melkites in Brazil until his death on 16 June 1985.

== See also ==
- Catholic Church in Brazil
