= Melkite Greek Catholic Eparchy of Nossa Senhora do Paraíso em São Paulo =

Eastern Catholic eparchy in Brazil

Eparchy of Nossa Senhora do Paraíso em São Paulo (Melkite Greek) Eparchia Dominae Nostrae Paradisi Sancti Pauli Graecorum Melkitarum

Catholic
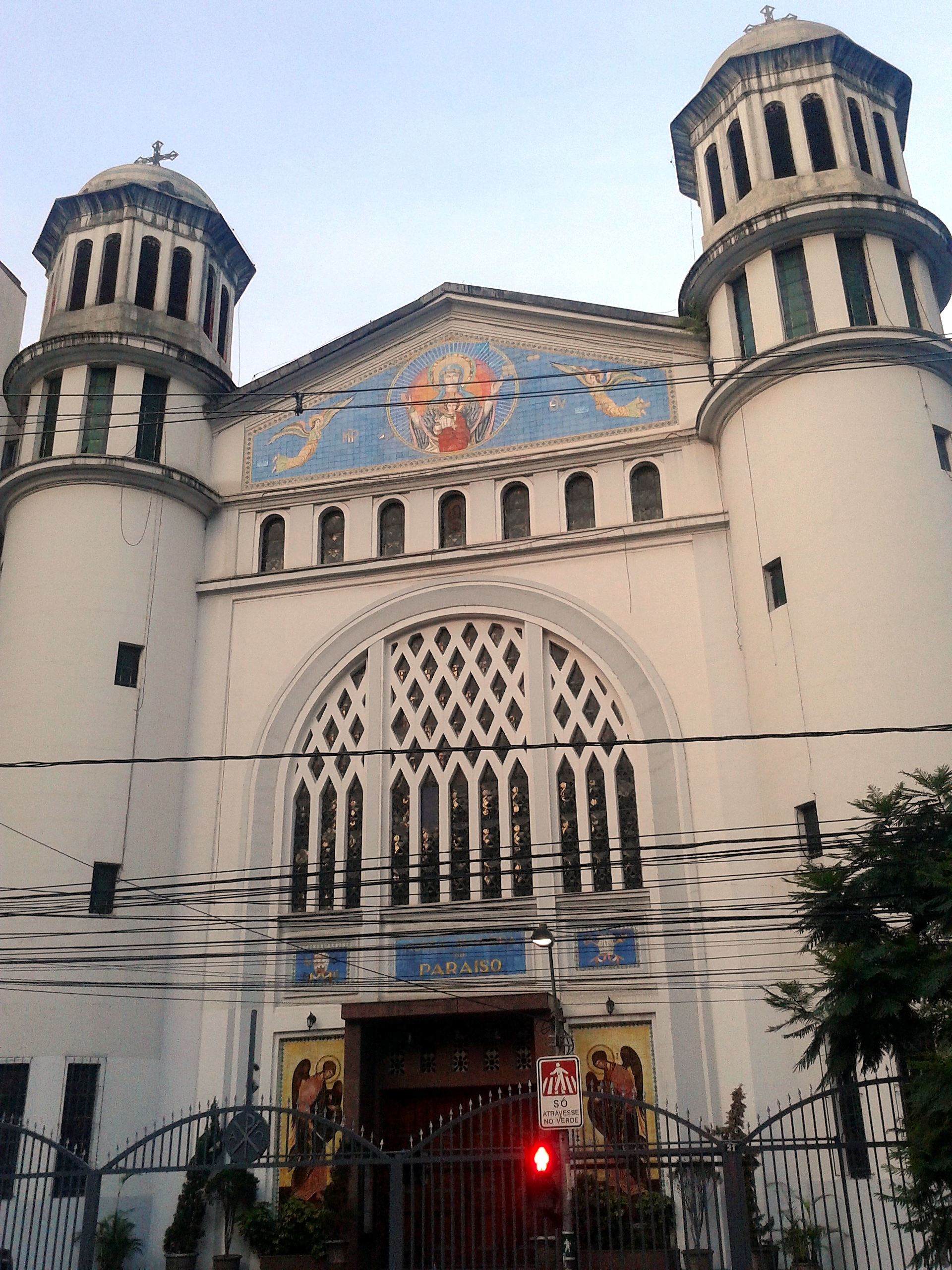
- Catedral de Nossa Senhora do Paraíso in 2015

Location
- Country: Brazil
- Ecclesiastical province: São Paulo

Statistics
- Population: (as of 2013); 436,000
- Parishes: 6

Information
- Denomination: Melkite Greek Catholic Church
- Rite: Byzantine Rite
- Established: 29 November 1971
- Cathedral: Catedral de Nossa Senhora do Paraíso

Current leadership
- Pope: Leo XIV
- Patriarch: Youssef Absi
- Eparch: George Khoury
- Bishops emeritus: Fares Maakaroun

Eparchy of Nossa Senhora do Paraíso em São Paulo (Latin: Eparchia Dominae Nostrae Paradisi Sancti Pauli Graecorum Melkitarum) is an eparchy located in the city of São Paulo in the ecclesiastical province of São Paulo in Brazil.

== Territory and statistics ==
The eparchy includes all Melkite Catholic faithful of the Melkite Greek Catholic Church in Brazil. Its eparchial seat is the city of São Paulo, where is located the Nossa Senhora do Paraíso Cathedral.

The territory is divided into five parishes. In 2013 there were 436,000 Catholics.

== History ==
On 14 November 1951 was erected the Ordinariate of Brazil to the Eastern Rite Catholics whom all Melkite Catholics belonged till November 29, 1971 when by Papal bull Haec Romana of Paul VI was established the Melkite Greek Catholic Eparchy of Nossa Senhora do Paraíso em São Paulo.

== Leadership ==
- Bishops of Nossa Senhora do Paraíso em São Paulo (Greek-Melkite Rite) and Coadjutor
  - Bishop Elias Coueter (November 29, 1971 – June 22, 1978)
  - Bishop Spiridon Mattar (June 22, 1978 – April 20, 1990)
  - Bishop Boutros Mouallem, S.M.S.P. (April 20, 1990 – July 29, 1998), appointed Archbishop of Akka [San Giovanni d’Acri; Tolemaide] (Melkite Greek), Israel
  - Archbishop (personal title) Fares Maakaroun (December 18, 1999 – July 21, 2014)
    - Bishop Joseph Gébara (October 31, 2013 – July 21, 2014), Coadjutor Bishop
  - Bishop Joseph Gébara (later Archbishop) (July 21, 2014 – February 20, 2018), appointed Archbishop of Petra e Filadelfia (Melkite Greek), Jordan
    - Bishop Sérgio de Deus Borges (May 23, 2018 – June 17, 2019), Apostolic Administrator
  - Bishop George Khoury (since June 17, 2019)
