= Ordinariate for the Faithful of Eastern Rites in Brazil =

Eastern Catholic jurisdiction in Brazil

Ordinariate for Eastern Catholics in Brazil

Location
- Country: Brazil
- Ecclesiastical province: Immediately exempt to the Holy See

Statistics
- Population: (as of 1998); 10,000
- Parishes: 4

Information
- Rite: Several
- Established: 14 November 1951

Current leadership
- Pope: Leo XIV
- Bishop: Walmor Oliveira de Azevedo

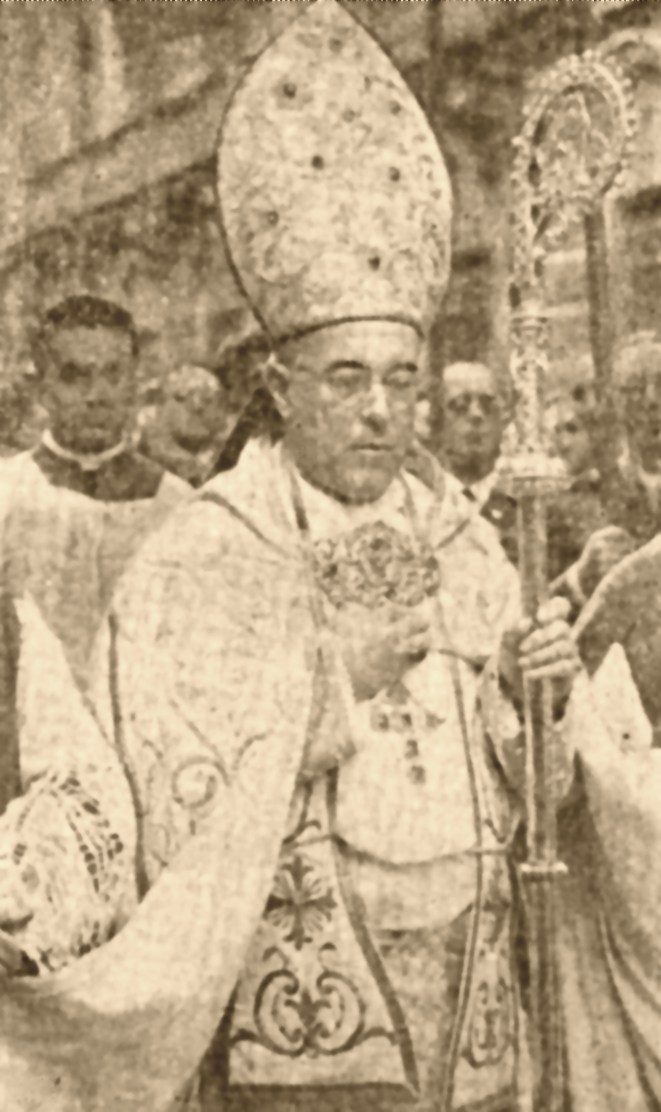
Cardenal Jaime de Barros Câmara, first ordinary of Brasil.

The Ordinariate of Brazil for the faithful of the Eastern rite or Brazil of the Eastern Rite (Portuguese: Ordinariato para os Fiéis de Ritos Orientais no Brasil) is an ordinariate (diocese-like structure of the Catholic Church) for the Eastern Catholics in Brazil without proper jurisdiction of their own particular churches sui iuris.

It is immediately exempt to the Holy See and its Roman Congregation for the Oriental Churches, not part of any ecclesiastical province. The ordinariate is headquartered Rua Cosme Velho 470, 20241-090 Rio de Janeiro, Rio de Janeiro state, Brazil and currently governed by Walmor Oliveira de Azevedo, (Latin) Metropolitan Archbishop of Belo Horizonte, but not vested in a particular see.

== History ==
The Ordinariate was erected on 14 November 1951 with the papal decree Cum fidelium of the Congregation for the Oriental Churches, which gave effect to a decision ex audientia of Pope Pius XII took on 26 October 1950, as Ordinariato para os Fiéis de Ritos Orientais no Brasil.

The same decree appointed the archbishop of Rio de Janeiro, Jaime de Barros Câmara, as its first ordinary.

On April 13, 1952 Barros Câmara inaugurated the ordinariate, appointed Francisco Nogueira Bessa as General Secretary of the same and created a system of general vicariates for the 3 major communities, each with its general guard: Elias Gorayeb for the Maronites, Archimandrite Elias Coueter for the Greek Melkites and Clemente Preima for the Uklirainians.

Since the establishment of the ordinariate, several Eastern Catholic churches have erected proper ecclesiastical jurisdictions within Brazil, with members now falling under these new jurisdictions:

- On 30 May 1962 for the faithful of the Ukrainian Greek Catholic Church was erected an Apostolic Exarchate (today Ukrainian Catholic Archeparchy of São João Batista em Curitiba),
  - which also got a suffragan, the Ukrainian Catholic Eparchy of Imaculada Conceição in Prudentópolis
- On 29 November 1971 were erected
  - the Maronite Catholic Eparchy of Our Lady of Lebanon of São Paulo for the faithful of the Maronite Church (Antiochene Rite)
  - the Melkite Greek Catholic Eparchy of Nossa Senhora do Paraíso em São Paulo for the Melkite Greek Catholic Church (a Byzantine Rite).
- On 3 July 1981 was erected
  - the Armenian Catholic Apostolic Exarchate of Latin America and Mexico, with cathedral see in São Paulo; also covering Mexico and Uruguay (with co-cathedral in Montevideo).

== Territory and statistics ==
The ordinariate includes all the faithful of the eastern rite of Brazil without their own jurisdiction. Its seat was the city of Rio de Janeiro, but its current headquarters is the city of Belo Horizonte, because since 2010 its ordinary is the metropolitan archbishop of Belo Horizonte Walmor Oliveira de Azevedo. Previously, the previous 3 ordinary were archbishops of Rio de Janeiro and the headquarters was in this city.

As per 1998 it pastorally served 10,000 baptized Eastern Catholic Brazilians in 4 parishes with 5 priests (2 diocesan, 3 religious) and 3 lay religious brothers.

=== Parishes ===
At present it only attends Syriac Catholic faithful, who have a parish, but the small communities of Italian-Albanian and Russian faithful dispersed and the faithful of other rites are insignificant in number and dispersed.

Although the 2016 Pontifical Yearbook mentions the existence of 4 parishes in the Ordinariate, but there is only one Eastern Catholic parish in Belo Horizonte, known as Igreja do Sagrado Coração de Jesus dos Siríacos Católicos, whose parish priest, George Rateb Massis, is the Syriac Catholic vicar of the ordinariate. The Capela Nossa Senhora da Anunciação of Ipiranga in São Paulo belonged since 1954 to the Ordinariate as a Russian Catholic mission, but after the death in 2005 of its parish priest, João Stoisser, its few remnant faithful become part of the Moscow Patriarchate of the Russian Orthodox Church together with the chapel. A small community of Italo-Albanian Byzantine rite used the Igreja de Nossa Senhora Aparecida in Riachuelo neighbourd in Rio de Janeiro until the death in 2002 of the parish priest Atanasio Accursi. Since then the mission has dispersed.

== Ordinaries ==
(all Roman Rite)

Ordinaries of Brazil of the Eastern Rite

- Jaime de Barros Câmara (November 14, 1951 – February 18, 1971 deceased), while Metropolitan Archbishop of São Sebastião do Rio de Janeiro (Brazil) (1943.07.03 – 1971.02.18), created Cardinal-Priest of Ss. Bonifacio ed Alessio (1946.02.22 – 1971.02.18), Military Vicar of Brazil (1950.11.06 – 1963.11.09), President of National Conference of Bishops of Brazil (1958–1964)
  - Auxiliary Bishop Elias Coueter (1960.11.25 – 1971.11.29)
  - Auxiliary Bishop José Romão Martenetz, O.S.B.M. (1958.05.10 – 1962.05.30)
  - Auxiliary Bishop João Chedid, O.M.M. (1956.05.04 – 1971.11.29) (later Archbishop)
- Eugênio Sales (July 22, 1972 – October 3, 2001 withdrawn), while Cardinal-Priest of S. Gregorio VII (1969.04.30 – death 2012.07.09), Metropolitan Archbishop of above São Sebastião do Rio de Janeiro (1971.03.13 – 2001.07.25), became Protopriest of College of Cardinals (2009.02.16 – 2012.07.09)
- Eusébio Scheid, SCI (October 3, 2001 – July 28, 2010 resigned), while Metropolitan Archbishop of above São Sebastião do Rio de Janeiro (2001.07.25 – retired 2009.02.27), created Cardinal-Priest of Ss. Bonifacio ed Alessio (2003.10.21 [2004.06.14] – ...)
- Walmor Oliveira de Azevedo, (28 July 2010 – ...), . while Metropolitan Archbishop of Belo Horizonte (Brazil) (2004.01.28 – ...).

== Auxiliary bishops ==
- José Romão Martenetz, O.S.B.M. (1958-1962), appointed Apostolic Exarch of Brazil
- Elias Coueter (1960-1971), appointed Bishop of Nossa Senhora do Paraíso em São Paulo (Melkite Greek), Sao Paulo
- Francis Mansour Zayek (1962-1966), appointed Bishop of United States of America (Maronite)
- João Chedid, O.M.M. (1968-1971), appointed Bishop of Nossa Senhora do Líbano em São Paulo (Maronite), Sao Paulo

== See also ==
- List of Catholic dioceses in Brazil
