= Joseph Khoury (bishop of Tyre) =

- Archeparch of Tyre
- Native name: چوزيف خورى
- Church: Maronite Church
- Archdiocese: Archeparchy of Tyre
- In office: 11 December 1959 – 5 February 1992
- Predecessor: Michael Doumith
- Successor: Maroun Khoury Sader
- Previous post: Titular Eparch of Ptolemais in Phoenicia dei Maroniti (1956-1959)Patriartchal Vicar of Antioch (1956-1959)

Orders
- Ordination: 20 December 1942
- Consecration: 29 June 1956 by Paul Peter Meouchi

Personal details
- Born: 24 October 1919 Bkassine, OETA West, Occupied Enemy Territory Administration
- Died: 5 February 1992 (aged 72)

Joseph Khoury (24 October 1919, in Bekassine, Lebanon – 5 February 1992) was a former Archeparch of the Maronite Catholic Archeparchy of Tyre.

== Life ==
Joseph Khoury was on December 20, 1942, ordained to the priesthood. On April 21, 1956, he was simultaneously appointed Titular bishop of Ptolemais in Phoenicia dei Maroniti, Patriarchal Vicar and Auxiliary bishop in the Maronite Patriarchate of Antioch. His confirmation by the Holy See occurred on 4 May 1956 and Khoury on 29 June 1956 was consecrated bishop by Maronite Patriarch of Antioch Paul Peter Meouchi and his co-consecrators were Pietro Dib, Eparch of Cairo and Anthony Peter Khoraish, Titular bishop of Tarsus dei Maroniti. His appointment as bishop of Tyre was announced on December 11, 1959. As eparchy Tyre was raised in 1965 to the rank to Archeparchy and Khoury was also chosen Archbishop.

During his tenure, he participated in the four sessions of the Second Vatican Council and acted as co-consecrator in the episcopal ordinations of Chucrallah Harb, Eparch of Baalbek (Lebanon), Joseph Salamé, Archeparch of Aleppo (Syria) and Curiacos Moussess, Chaldean Catholic Bishop of Amadiya (Iraq).

Khoury died on February 5, 1992, at the age of 72.

== See also ==
- Maronite church
