= João Chedid =

Lebanese Bishop in Brazil

João Chedid OMM
- (Arch)Eparch of Our Lady of Lebanon of São Paulo
- Native name: يوحنا شديد
- Church: Maronite Church
- Diocese: Eparchy of Our Lady of Lebanon of São Paulo
- In office: 27 February 1988 – 9 June 1990
- Predecessor: Himself (as Eparch)
- Successor: Joseph Mahfouz
- Previous posts: Eparch of Our Lady of Lebanon of São Paulo (1971-1988); Auxiliary Bishop of the Ordinariate for the Faithful of Eastern Rites in Brazil (1968-1971); Titular Bishop of Arca in Phoenicia dei Maroniti (1956-1971)

Orders
- Ordination: 20 December 1941
- Consecration: 29 June 1956 by Paul Peter Meouchi

Personal details
- Born: 18 February 1914 Kherbet Qanafar (near Joub Jannine), Vilayet of Syria, Ottoman Empire
- Died: 31 July 1991 (aged 77)

João Chedid, OMM (18 February 1914 – 31 July 1991) was the first Maronite Bishop of the Maronite Catholic Eparchy of Our Lady of Lebanon of São Paulo in Brazil.

== Life ==
Chedid was born in Kherbet-Kanafar, Lebanon. On 20 December 1941 he was ordained a priest in the OMM. On April 21, 1956, he was appointed auxiliary bishop to the Ordinariate for Eastern Catholics in Brazil, at the same time he was also appointed titular bishop of Arca in Phoenicia dei Maroniti.

The Maronite Patriarch of Antioch and all the East Paul Peter Meouchi ordained him bishop on June 29, 1956, assisted by the co-consecrators Pietro Dib (Eparch of Cairo) and Anthony Peter Khoraish (then Eparch of Sidon).

From 1968 to 1971 Chedid was also Patriarchal Vicar of the Maronites in Brazil.

On November 29, 1971, he was appointed Bishop to São Paulo, in this office, he was on 27 February 1988 named Archbishop Pro hac vice to São Paulo. He was a Council Father during the second session of the II Vatican Council. In 1961 he was co-consecrator of Nasrallah Boutros Sfeir, who later became Patriarch of Antioch. Chedid resigned on June 9, 1990, as Bishop and became an Emeritus bishop until his death on 31 July 1991.
