= Maroun Khoury Sader =

- Archeparch of Tyre
- Native name: مارون خورى صادر
- Church: Maronite Church
- Archdiocese: Archeparchy of Tyre
- In office: 1 June 1992 – 25 September 2003
- Predecessor: Joseph Khoury
- Successor: Chucrallah-Nabil El-Hage

Orders
- Ordination: 11 May 1952
- Consecration: 18 July 1992 by Nasrallah Boutros Sfeir

Personal details
- Born: 25 December 1926 Ain Ebel, Mandatory Lebanese Republic, French Empire
- Died: 26 August 2015 (aged 88)

Maroun Khoury Sader (Arabic: مارون خوري صادر, romanized: Mārūn Khūrī Ṣāder), (born on December 25, 1926, Ain Ebel, Lebanon – died on August 26, 2015) was a Maronite Archeparch of the Maronite Catholic Archeparchy of Tyre.

== Life ==
Ordained to the priesthood on May 11, 1952, Khoury Sader was named Archbishop of Tyre, Lebanon, on June 1, 1992, by Pope John Paul II. Maronite Patriarch of Antioch Nasrallah Boutros Sfeir ordained Sader to the episcopate on July 18, 1992, and his co-consecrators were Roland Aboujaoudé, Auxiliary bishop of Antioch, and Joseph Merhi, MLM, Eparch of Cairo. Sader retired on September 25, 2003, of his duties as Archeparch.

Sader died on August 26, 2015, at the age of 88.
