= Our Lady of Lebanon Cathedral, São Paulo =

Our Lady of Lebanon Cathedral
- Catedral Nossa Senhora do Líbano
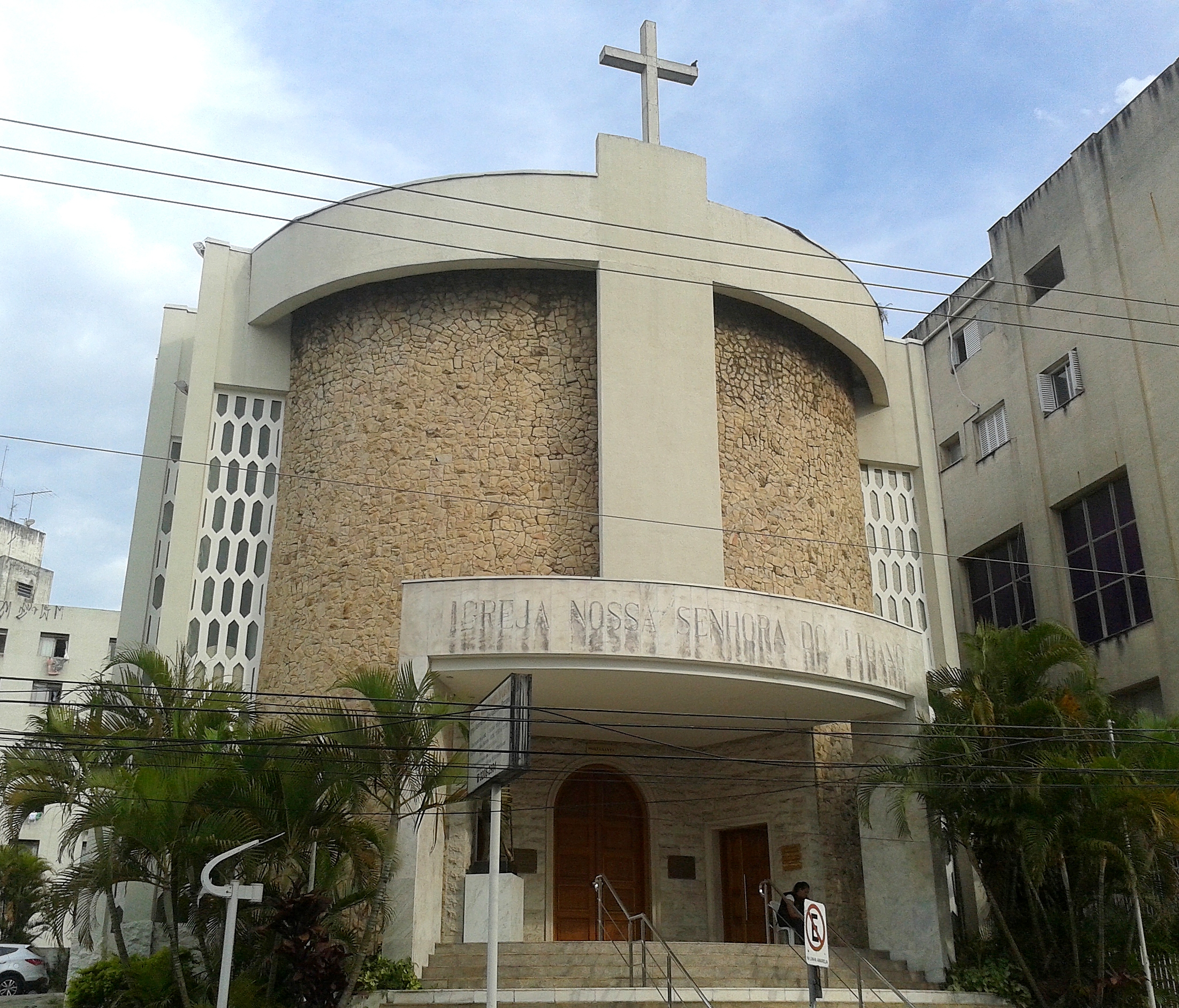
- Our Lady of Lebanon Cathedral
- Location: São Paulo
- Country: Brazil
- Denomination: Catholic church (Maronite rite)

Administration
- Archdiocese: São Paulo
- Diocese: Eparchy of Our Lady of Lebanon of São Paulo

The Our Lady of Lebanon Cathedral (Portuguese: Catedral Nossa Senhora do Líbano ) also called Maronite Cathedral of São Paulo Is the name that receives a religious building affiliated to the Catholic Church of Maronite rite that is located in the city of São Paulo in the state of the same name in the southeastern region of Brazil. It should not be confused with the other Catholic cathedrals of the city that include 4 of Latin rite (the Cathedral of Santo Amaro, Metropolitan Cathedral of Our Lady of the Assumption, Cathedral of St. Michael and Cathedral of the Holy Family) and the other 2 of Catholic oriental rites (Melkite Cathedral Our Lady of Paradise and the Armenian Cathedral of St. Gregory the Illuminator).

The temple follows the Antiochian liturgical tradition and functions as the seat of the Maronite Catholic Eparchy of Our Lady of Lebanon of São Paulo (Eparchia Dominae Nostrae Libanensis Sancti Pauli Maronitarum) which began as an apostolic exarchate under the pontificate of Pope John XXIII and was elevated To his present status by Pope Paul VI in 1971.

It is under the pastoral responsibility of Bishop Edgar Amine Madi.

== See also ==
- Roman Catholicism in Brazil
