= Fares Maakaroun =

Lebanese-born Melkite Greek Catholic archbishop (born 1940)

Most Reverend Fares Maakaroun S.M.S.P.
- Archbishop-Bishop Emeritus of Nossa Senhora do Paraíso em São Paulo
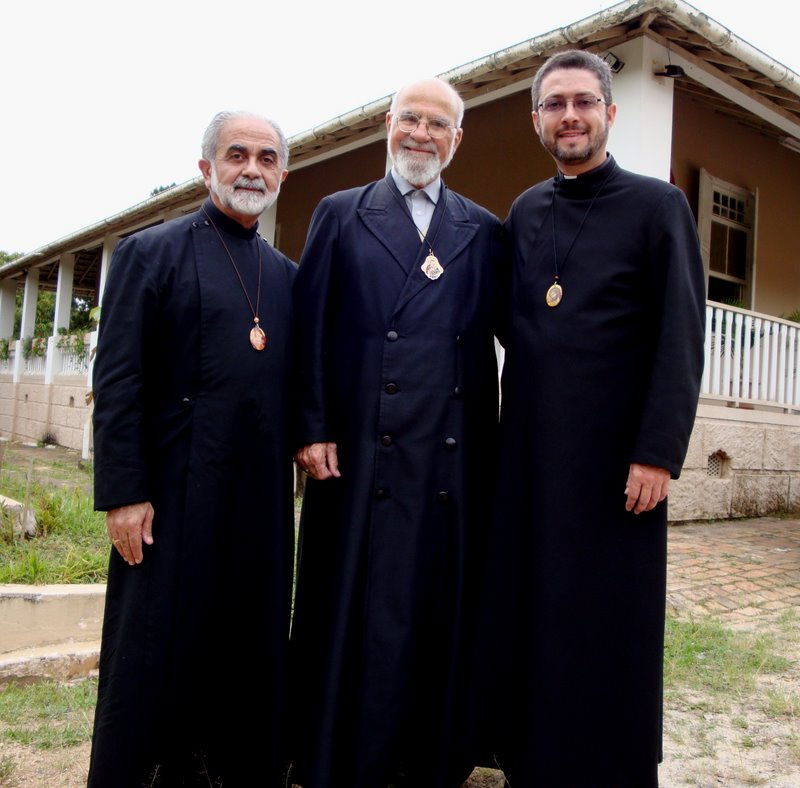
- Fares Maakaroun (left) alongside Bishop Spiridon Mattar
- Church: Melkite Greek Catholic Church
- Diocese: Nossa Senhora do Paraíso em São Paulo
- See: São Paulo, Brazil
- Appointed: 18 December 1999
- Installed: 12 March 2000
- Term ended: 21 July 2014
- Predecessor: Boutros Mouallem
- Successor: Joseph Gébara
- Other post: Archbishop of Latakia (1995–1999)

Orders
- Ordination: 18 December 1966 by Philippe Nabaa
- Consecration: 17 December 1995 by Maximos V Hakim, Michel Yatim and Jean Mansour

Personal details
- Born: Fares Maakaroun; 12 November 1940 (age 85) Rayaq, Lebanon
- Education: Seminary of the White Fathers (Jerusalem)

Fares Maakaroun, S.M.S.P. (born 12 October 1940) is a Lebanese-born Melkite Catholic hierarch, who was an archbishop of the Melkite Greek Catholic Eparchy of Nossa Senhora do Paraíso em São Paulo in Brazil from 1999 to 2014. Previously he served as archbishop of the Melkite Greek Catholic Archeparchy of Latakia, in Syria, from 1995 to 1999.

== Career ==
Maakaroun was born in Rayak (Riyaq), Lebanon. He attended the primary school of his native town and then moved on to secondary school in Harissa. After the school, Maakaroun went as a novice to the White Fathers in Gap (France). He studied from 1960 philosophy and theology at the seminary of the White Fathers in Jerusalem and received a licentiate in theology. Maakaroun received his priestly ordination on 18 December 1966 for the Missionary Society of St Paul. Prior to his appointment as bishop in 1995, he was a professor at the seminary in Harissa, director of the Seminary of Damascus, Secretary General of Caritas Lebanon and finally Vicar General in Latakia in Syria.

== Bishop Offices ==
On 31 July 1995 Maakaroun received the appointment as Archbishop of Latakia in Syria and on 17 December 1995 by Patriarch Maximos V Hakim was consecrated Archbishop. His co-consecrators were Archbishop (emeritus) Michel Yatim of Latakia and Archbishop Jean Mansour, SMSP, Titular Archbishop of Apamea of Greek Melkites and Auxiliary Bishop of Antioch.

On 31 December 1999, Maakaroun received the appointment as archbishop "Pro hac vice", as bishop of the Melkite Greek Catholic Church in Brazil. In this role he was co-consecrator of Archbishop Nikolaki Sawaf of Latakia. In October 2010, he participated in the Special Assembly of the Synod of Bishops on the Middle East in Rome. His objections to the final protocol was the call to engage in love for peace - but, he argued that "... there is no true love without true holiness. Let us be holy as our heavenly Father is holy. Holiness is the solution. Yes, sacred love, this is the solution." On 21 July 2014 Fares Maakaroun presented his apostolic resignation and was succeeded by his assistant, Joseph Gébara.
