= Our Lady of Paradise Cathedral, São Paulo =

Catedral de Nossa Senhora do Paraíso
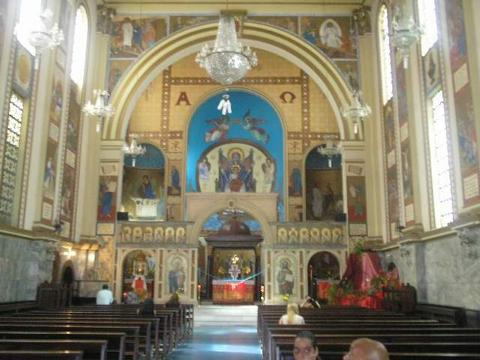
- Catedral de Nossa Senhora do Paraíso
- 23°34′21″S 46°38′33″W
- Location: Rua do Paraíso, 25; São Paulo
- Country: Brazil
- Denomination: Melkite Greek Catholic Church

Administration
- Archdiocese: São Paulo
- Diocese: Eparchy of Nossa Senhora do Paraíso em São Paulo

Catedral de Nossa Senhora do Paraíso is a church located in São Paulo, Brazil and is the seat of the Melkite Greek Catholic Eparchy of Nossa Senhora do Paraíso em São Paulo. The cathedral is located in the neighborhood of Paraíso in the city of São Paulo and was constructed in 1952.

This church became bishop's see on November 29, 1971, after being transferred from Saint Basil Church (Rio de Janeiro).
