= Joseph Mahfouz =

Joseph Mahfouz OLM
- Eparch of Our Lady of Lebanon of São Paulo
- Native name: جوزيف محفوظ
- Church: Maronite Church
- Diocese: Maronite Catholic Eparchy of Our Lady of Lebanon of São Paulo
- In office: 9 June 1990 – 14 October 2006
- Predecessor: João Chedid
- Successor: Edgard Madi

Orders
- Ordination: 29 June 1960
- Consecration: 12 August 1990 by Nasrallah Boutros Sfeir

Personal details
- Born: 20 February 1932 Ghadir, Jounieh, Mandatory Lebanon
- Died: 25 August 2010 (aged 78) Ghadir, Jounieh, Mount Lebanon Governorate, Lebanon

Joseph Mahfouz, OLM (born 20 February 1932 in Ghadir, Lebanon - died 25 August 2010, Ghadir, Lebanon) was a clergyman of the Maronite rite and eparch of the Maronite Catholic Eparchy of Our Lady of Lebanon of São Paulo. He was the third eparch of the Maronite Church in Brazil.

== Biography ==
Joseph Mahfouz joined the Congregation of the OLM and received on 29 June, 1960, the ordination to the priesthood. Pope John Paul II appointed him on June 9, 1990, Archbishop of the Eparchy of the Our Lady of Lebanon in São Paulo. Maronite Patriarch of Antioch, Nasrallah Boutros Sfeir gave him on 12 August of the same year the episcopal ordination. His co-consecrators were Bishops Roland Aboujaoudé, Maronite auxiliary bishop of Antioch and Bechara Boutros al-Rahi, OMM, future Maronite Patriarch of Antioch.

Mahfouz resigned as Bishop of Our Lady of Lebanon in São Paulo on 14 October, 2006. He was succeeded by Bishop Edgard Madi.

He died of cancer and was buried in the cemetery Nisbei Ghosta in Lebanon.

== Works ==
- Saint Charbel Makhlouf: monk and hermit of the Lebanese Maronite Order. 1976.
- La Servante de Dieu La Soeur Rafqa de Himalaya. Rome, 1980.
- Short history of the Maronite Church. Imprimerie St. Paul, 1986.
- The blessed Nimatullah Kassab Al-Hardini. In: Volume 26 by Third Centennial Lebanese Maronite Order Publications, Monastery of Saints Cyprian and Justine, 1998.
- The blessed Nimatullah Kassab Al-Hardini: His life, words and spiritualities. Lebanese Maronite Order.
