= Charbel Abdallah =

Catholic archbishop (born 1967)

Charbel Yusef Abdallah
- Archeparch of Tyre
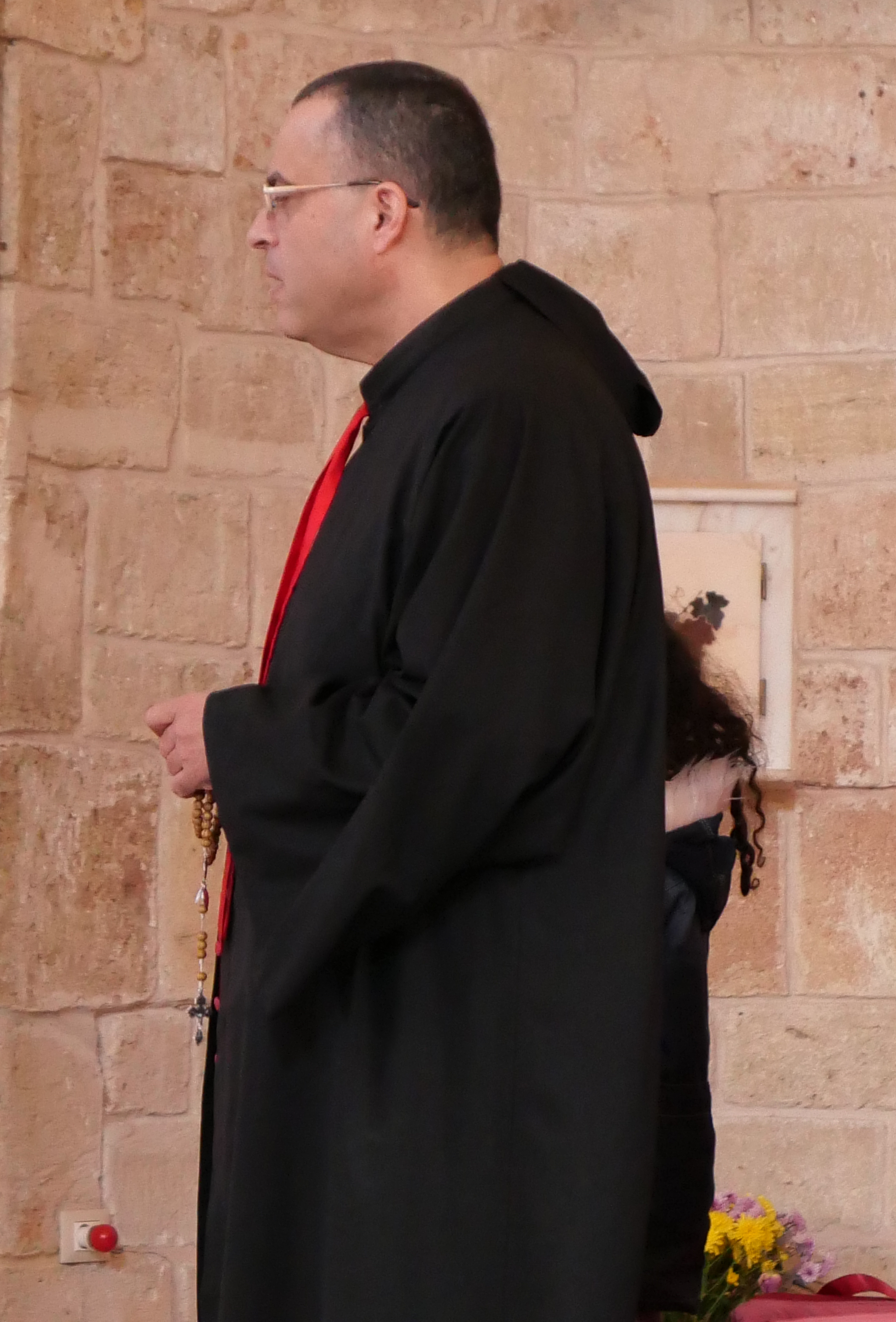
- Abdallah in 2021
- Native name: شربل عبد الله
- Church: Maronite Church
- Archdiocese: Archeparchy of Tyre
- Installed: 1 November 2020
- Predecessor: Chucrallah-Nabil El-Hage

Orders
- Ordination: 24 October 1992
- Consecration: 5 December 2020 by Bechara Boutros al-Rahi

Personal details
- Born: 17 February 1967 (age 59) Hajjeh, South Governorate, Lebanon

Charbel Yusef Abdallah (Levantine Arabic: شربل عبد الله, romanized: Sharbel ʿAbd Allāh, born 17 February 1967 in Hajjeh, Lebanon) is the Archeparch of the Maronite Catholic Archeparchy of Tyre.

== Life ==
Abdallah was born in the village of Hajjéh in the district of Sidon (Saida), which is part of the South Governorate in Southern Lebanon and belongs to the Maronite Archeparchy of Tyre. He was named after Charbel Makhlouf (1828-1898), a Maronite monk and priest who was canonized in 1977.

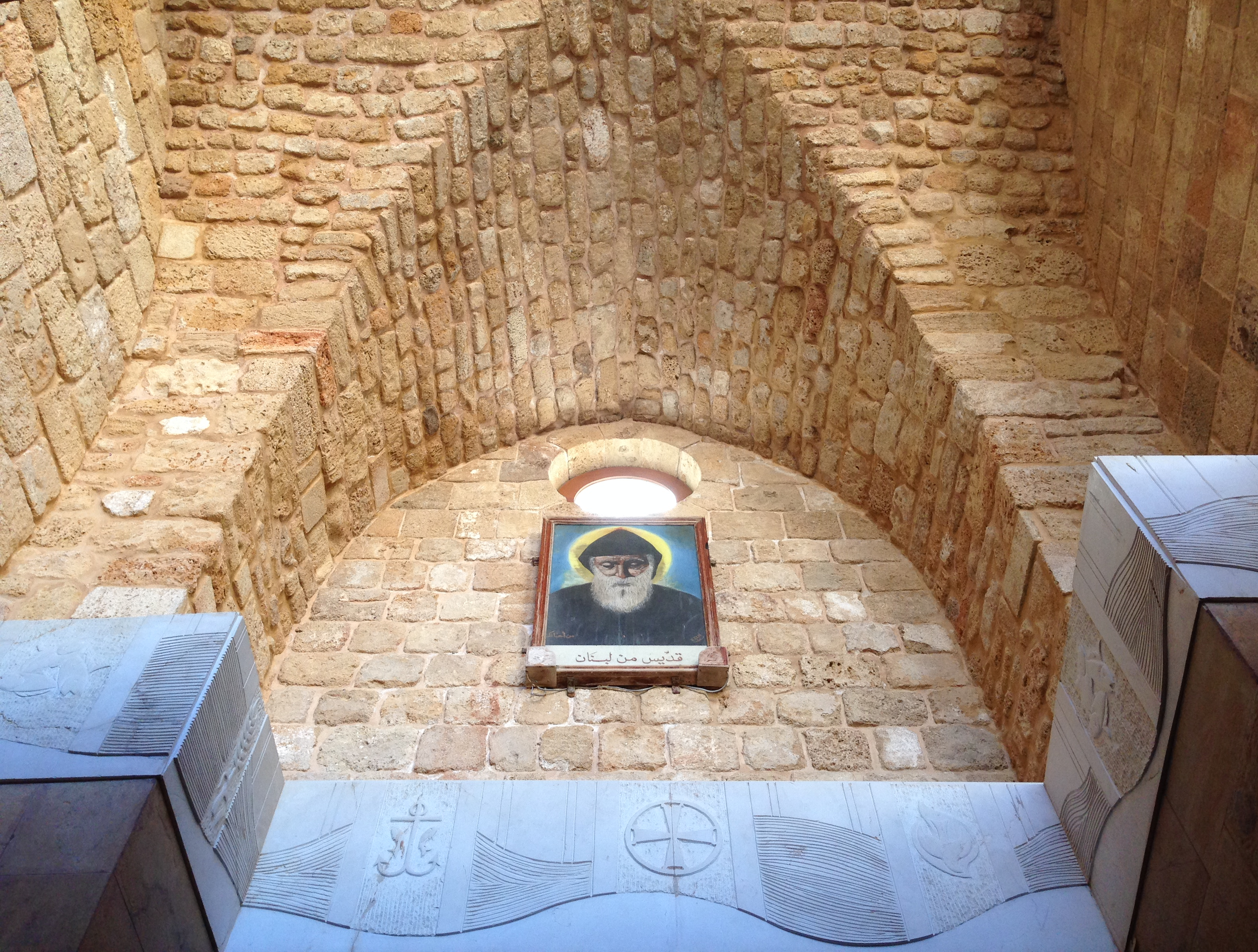
A portrait of Saint Charbel seen from the "Sanctuary of Holy Martyrs" underneath the cathedral of "Our Lady of the Seas"

Abdallah entered the seminary and studied at the private Holy Spirit University of Kaslik in Mount Lebanon. In 1992 he obtained a licentiate of Theology there and on October 24 of that year received his priestly ordination. Abdallah incardinated himself in the Archeparchy of Tyre and was appointed parish priest of Saint Joseph of Hajjeh and of Saint Joseph of Kfarwa, still in 1992.

Starting from 1994, he was for two years also in charge of the General Secretariat of the Archeparchy and until 1998 the head of the local Caritas. Between 1997 and 1999 he was also the Spiritual Director at the Patriarchal Seminary of Ghazir in Mount Lebanon.

After he had received another licentiate - in philosophy from the public Lebanese University (LU) in Beirut - he moved to Strasbourg in 1999 where he received a doctorate in theology with liturgical orientation in 2003 from the Marc Bloch University. During his stay in France he was also assistant parish priest at Notre-Dame du Liban and then at Notre-Dame d'Auteuil in Paris.

On his return to Lebanon in 2003, he was appointed Episcopal Vicar for the pastoral and parish priest of Our Lady of the Seas in Tyre.

Following the July 2006 Lebanon War between Israel and Hezbollah, Abdallah was appointed by Archeparch Chucrallah-Nabil El-Hage to organise aid work for the Catholic Near East Welfare Association in South Lebanon's Christian villages together with representatives of the Melkite Greek Catholic Archeparchy of Tyre and the Melkite Greek Catholic Archeparchy of Baniyas.

In 2010, Abdallah became Protosyncellus in Tyre.

In October 2020, when Archeparch El-Hage submitted his resignation, the Synod of the Maronite Catholic Patriarchate of Antioch elected Abdallah to be his successor. Following the assent by the Holy Father his election was announced on November 1. On December 5, he was consecrated by Patriarch Bechara Boutros al-Rahi. His consecrators were his predecessor El-Hage and the bishop of Sidon, Maroun Ammar, who is also from Hajjéh.

== Works ==
- «Le traite du Patriarche Douaihy sure l'amenagment des eglises Maronites». L'amenagement et l'architecture de l'epace sacre des eglises Maronites au Liban d'apres le «Traite des Eglises» et le «Traite de l'Autel» du Patriarche Stephane Douaihy. (PhD-thesis)
- L'architecture d'une église Maronite selonle Patriarche Douaïhy (1630-1704), in: Parole de l'Orient 29 (2004), pp. 61–81
