= Ammatour =

Ammatour عمّاطور
- Municipality
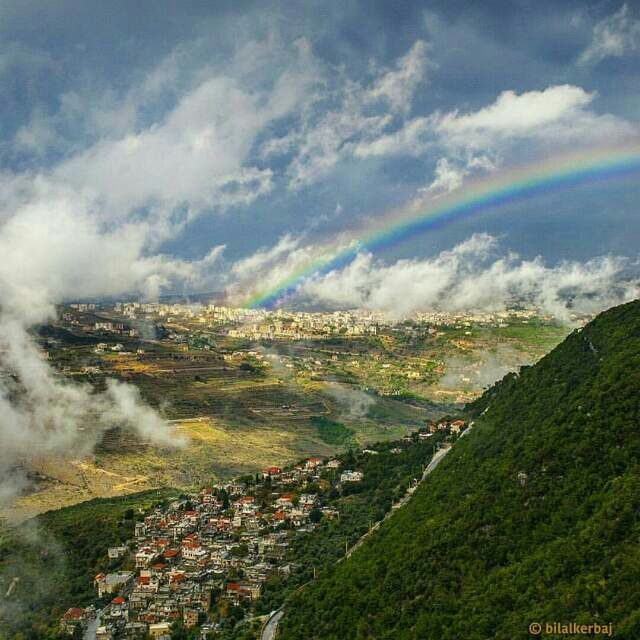
- Ammatour

- Location within Lebanon
- Coordinates: 33°38′33″N 35°36′31″E
- Country: Lebanon
- Governorate: Mount Lebanon
- District: Chouf
- Highest elevation: 1,050 m (3,440 ft)
- Lowest elevation: 800 m (2,600 ft)
- Time zone: +2
  - Summer (DST): +3

Ammatour (Arabic: عمّاطور, romanized: ʿAmmāṭūr) is a town and municipality in the Shouf (Al-Shouf) District in Mount Lebanon Governorate of Lebanon. It lies 57 km southeast of Beirut, at an elevation of between 800 and 1,050 meters above sea level. The name "Ammatour" is derived from the words 'Ain Maa Tour' or Arabic: عين ماء طور, romanized: ʿAyn Māʾ Ṭūr, meaning the spring of the mountain. Ammatour is one of Lebanon's richest villages in sources of water with more than 365 springs, fountains, and a river located within its jurisdiction.

== History ==
Politically and administratively, Ammatour was declared one of the five "Special status" villages in Mount Lebanon in 1711, which were outside the control of any "iqta'" (feudal lordship). Instead, its inhabitants paid their land tax directly to the treasury of the office of the Ottoman governor of Mount Lebanon.

Ammatour occupies a significant religious position as the birthplace of five shuyukh uqqal (sing. sheikh aql), who serve as the religious leaders of the Druze community. Furthermore, the first Patriarch of the Melkite Greek Catholic Church in the Middle East was anointed and appointed in Ammatour in 1724. (Note: See the letter sent by Sheikh Mohammad Abu Shakra, The Sheikh Al-Aql of the Druze to Pope John Paul II in January 1983, published in the following:.) A son of a Melkite family from the town, Archbishop Joseph Gebara served until 2024 as Melkite Catholic Archbishop of Jordan. In 1927, the municipality of Ammatour was founded, and documented records indicate that the town had mayors since 1870.

== Demographics ==
Ammatour has about 4000 registered residents made up of a Druze majority and a Christian minority consisting of Melkite Catholics and Maronites. Its communities have lived together in harmony for centuries. The largest and best known of its Druze families are Abou Chakra (also written as "Abu/Bou Shakra/Chakra") and Abdel Samad (also written "Abdul Samad"), both of which have played major political, economic and religious roles in Lebanon's history, particularly during the 19th century. The largest Christian families are Salem, Jebara (also written as "Gebara"), Lutaif and Bou Raad.

== Culture ==
Ammatour enjoys one of the highest literacy and higher education rates in Lebanon; many of its inhabitants hold prominent political, educational, cultural, financial and military jobs in Lebanon and abroad. Its public school, founded in 1926, is one of the oldest public schools in Lebanon, and the second to have its students sit for the intermediate certificate examinations. In 1936 a group of young, educated people from Ammatour founded one of Lebanon's first public libraries, and named it "Ghurfat Al-Mutala'a Ad-Dimuqratiyya" (The Democratic Reading Room). Within a few years, in 1943, they published their own magazine “Beit Ath-Thaqaafa” (The Home of Culture), which was one of the first of its kind in the country.

The town's cultural activities are undertaken by its social and sporting clubs and associations, including: The Social Sporting Club of Ammatour - Amigos Ammatour sports association, The Ammatour Women's Association, and The Cultural Meeting Association (Jami'yyat Al-Liqaa Al-Thaqafi). The Amigos are one of the best sport clubs in the region, and has had a great era during the 1970s and 1980s, winning a lot of trophies in several sports, including: volleyball, basketball, swimming, chess, table tennis.

In mid-September Ammatour celebrates its annual festival “Eid Az-Zaitoun” (The Olives Festival), with musical and singing programmes for the end of summer and the approaching olive harvest season.

Ammatour also has a tree nursery.
