= Chucrallah-Nabil El-Hage =

- Archeparch Emeritus of Tyre
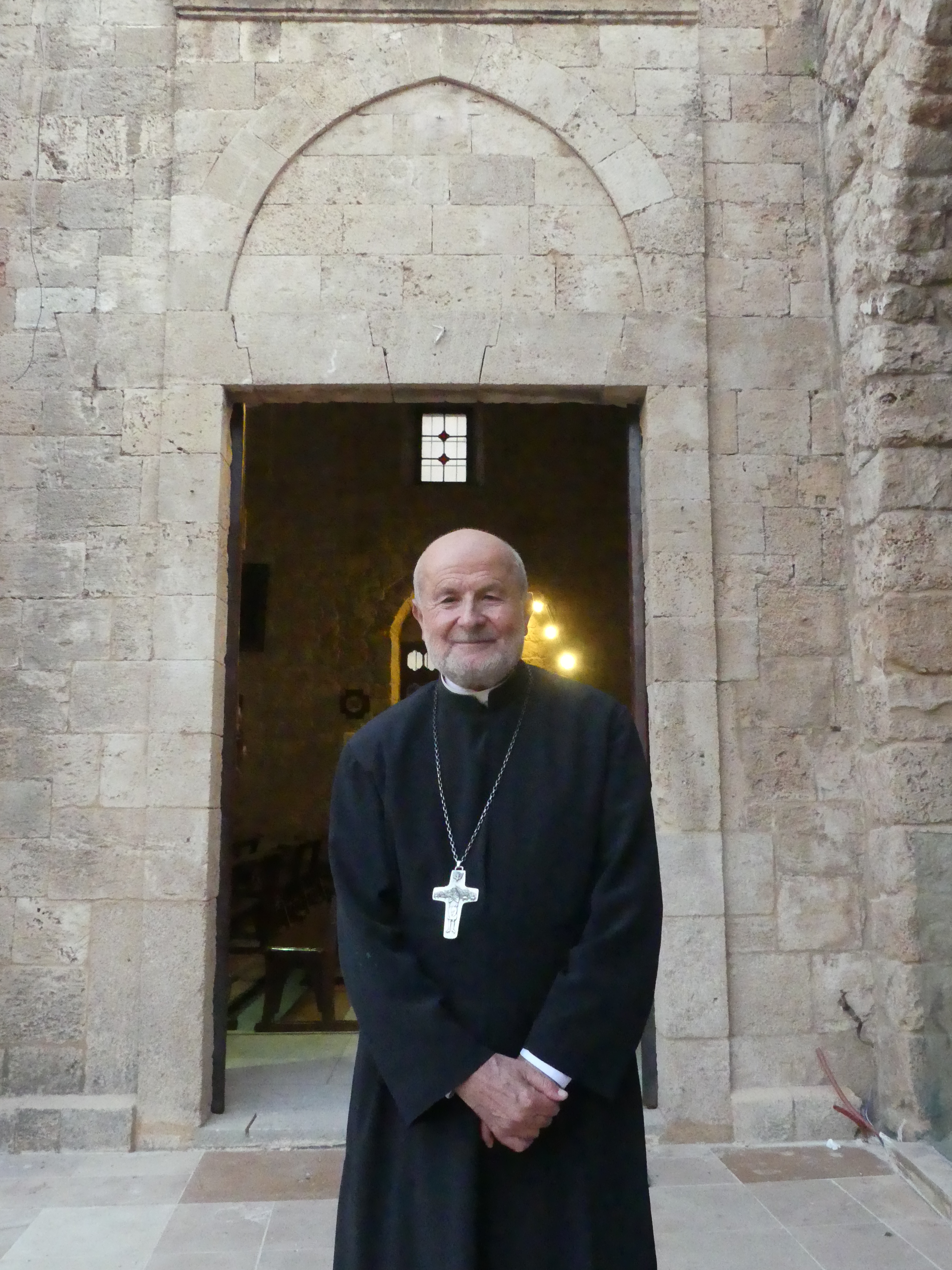
- El Hajj in front of the Cathedral "Notre Dame Des Mers" in Tyre, 2019
- Native name: شكرالله نبيل الحاج
- Church: Maronite Church
- Archdiocese: Archeparchy of Tyre
- In office: 25 September 2003 – 1 November 2020
- Predecessor: Maroun Khoury Sader
- Successor: Charbel Abdallah

Orders
- Ordination: 13 June 1970
- Consecration: 29 November 2003 by Nasrallah Boutros Sfeir

Personal details
- Born: 26 February 1943 (age 83) Hajjeh, Mandatory Lebanese Republic, French Empire

Chucrallah-Nabil El-Hage (in Arabic: شكرالله نبيل الحاج, romanized: Shukrallah Nabīl al-Ḥājj), also transliterated Shukrallah Nabil El Hajj (born 26 February 1943 in Hajjeh, Lebanon), is a Maronite Catholic prelate who served as the Archeparch of the Maronite Catholic Archeparchy of Tyre from 2003 until his retirement in 2020.

== Life and education ==
El-Hage was born in Hajjé, a village in the district of Sidon (Saida), which is part of the South Governorate in Southern Lebanon.

He entered into the seminary of the Maronite Patriarchate in Ghazir in 1957. He completed his secondary education in 1962 after attending the Supplementary at Marist Brothers in Sidon as well. In 1963 El-Hage entered in the Saint Joseph University in Beirut, where he studied philosophy and theology. On 13 June 1970 El-Hage was ordained to the priesthood. In subsequent years he worked as a teacher and librarian at the clerical school of Ghazir, which he had attended as a pupil himself.

In 1977, he obtained a degree in French language by the Lebanese University and received a grant from the government to study in France, where he obtained a Diploma of Advanced Studies (DEA) from the Provence University, and later obtained a doctorate in 1981 in the French language.

== Work ==
On his return to Lebanon, El-Hage taught at the Saint Joseph University and the Lebanese University. In 1988, El-Hage represented Lebanon at an international conference about Muslim-Christian relations.

In 1992, he was appointed Vicar General to Tyre's newly ordained Archbishop Maroun Khoury Sader and was tasked with guiding Caritas humanitarian activities in Tyre and Bint Jbeil.

In June 2003, El-Hage was elected as successor to the Sader who had retired. After the confirmation by the Holy See on September 25, 2003, El-Hage was ordained by Maronite Patriarch of Antioch, Cardinal Nasrallah Boutros Sfeir, and his co-consecrators were Roland Aboujaoudé, Auxiliary bishop of Antioch and Maroun Khoury Sader, emeritus Archeparch of Tyre on 29 November 2003.

On the Special Assembly of the Synod for the Middle East, the Archbishop took the view that the Christians should not lead lonely battle, but in solidarity should live with all citizens. As an example for the coexistence of Christians and Muslims, he cited the ADYAN Foundation. In many sermons and contributions he previously urged the Lebanese Christians not to leave the country.

On 1 November 2020, the Synod of Bishops of the Patriarchal Church of Antioch of the Maronites announced that it accepted Hajj's age-related resignation and elected his Protosyncellus Charbel Abdallah, who hails from Hajjeh as well, as his successor.
