= Maronite Catholic Eparchy of Our Lady of Lebanon of São Paulo =

Eastern Catholic diocese in Brazil

Eparchy of Our Lady of Lebanon of São Paulo Eparchia Dominae Nostrae Libanensis Sancti Pauli Maronitarum

Catholic
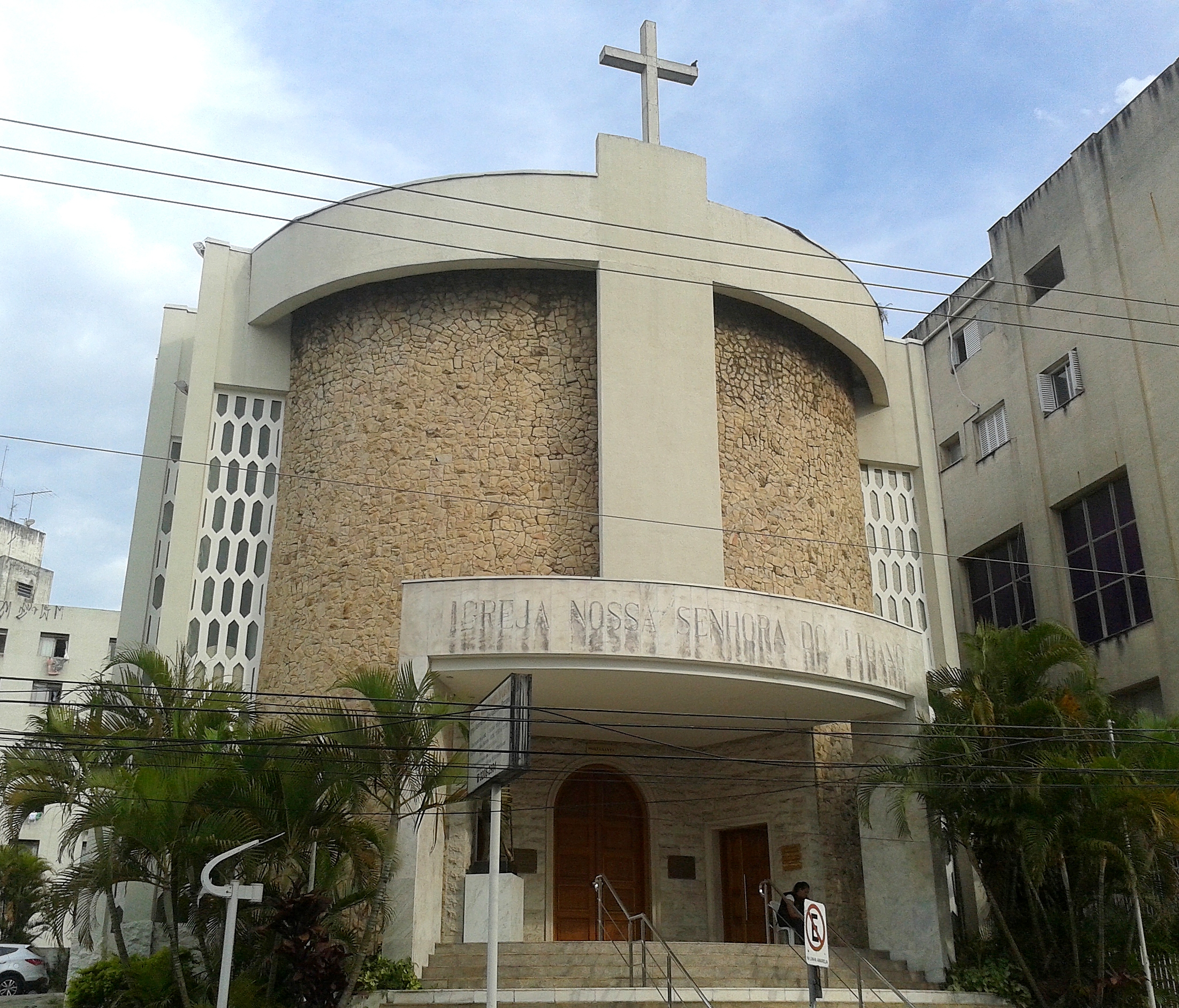
- Our Lady of Lebanon Cathedral, São Paulo

Location
- Country: Brazil
- Ecclesiastical province: São Paulo

Statistics
- Population: (as of 2013); 489,000
- Parishes: 11

Information
- Denomination: Catholic Church
- Sui iuris church: Maronite Church
- Rite: West Syro-Antiochene Rite
- Established: 29 November 1971 (54 years ago)
- Cathedral: Our Lady of Lebanon Cathedral
- Patron saint: Our Lady of Lebanon

Current leadership
- Pope: Leo XIV
- Patriarch: Bechara Boutros al-Rahi
- Eparch: Edgard Madi
- Metropolitan Archbishop: Odilo Scherer

Website
- www.igrejamaronita.org.br

The Eparchy of Our Lady of Lebanon of São Paulo (Portuguese: Eparquia Nossa Senhora do Líbano em São Paulo; Latin: Eparchia Dominae Nostrae Libanensis Sancti Pauli Maronitarum) is a Maronite Church ecclesiastical territory or eparchy of the Catholic Church in Brazil. Its episcopal see is São Paulo. The current bishop is Edgard Madi. The Eparchy of Our Lady of Lebanon of São Paulo is a suffragan eparchy in the ecclesiastical province of the metropolitan Archdiocese of São Paulo, a Latin Church archdiocese.

== Territory and statistics ==
Maronite Catholic Eparchy of Our Lady of Lebanon in São Paulo includes all Maronite Catholic believers living in Brazil. Its eparchial seat is São Paulo, where the cathedra is found in the Our Lady of Lebanon Cathedral. The eparchy includes Maronite parishes in Brazil, which are situated mainly in the southeastern part of the country: São Paulo, Bauru, Belo Horizonte, Porto Alegre, Sao Jose do Rio Preto, Rio de Janeiro, Campinas, Guarulhos and Piracicaba.

The territory of the eparchy is divided into 10 parishes and in 2013 there were 489,000 Maronite Catholics.

== History ==
On 30 May 1962, Pope John XXIII established the Maronite Apostolic Exarchate (the equivalent in the Eastern Churches of a Vicariate Apostolic) for Maronite Catholics in Brazil and appointed Bishop Francis Mansour Zayek to head it. He was the first bishop appointed to operate outside the historical areas of the Maronite Patriarchate of Antioch and all the East to serve in the Maronite diaspora. He was officially ordained bishop on 5 August 1962 as an auxiliary bishop of the Roman Catholic Archdiocese of Rio de Janeiro, and titular bishop of Callinicum dei Maroniti.

Zayek served as bishop for the Maronite Catholics of that country until 1966, when he was transferred by the Holy See to the United States. Monsignor Anthony Joubeir was appointed vicar-general to Maronite faithful until 1968. He was succeeded on March 1, 1968, by Bishop João Chedid. who was already bishop and Vicar General of the Maronite Patriarch in Lebanon and since 1956 was auxiliary bishop and held the Vicar General of the Maronite Patriarch in Lebanon and Ordinary for Eastern Catholic faithful in Brazil.

These two Maronite bishops, Zayek and Chedid, were exarchs and auxiliary bishops of the Ordinary Catholics of the East in Brazil, which at that time was the archbishop of Rio de Janeiro.

On 29 November 1971, Pope Paul VI raised the exarchate to the rank of an eparchy canonically elected by the apostolic constitution Quod provident, of November 29, 1971, became then an ecclesiastical circumscription of the Maronite Church, one of the sui juris Churches of the Catholic Church, separating itself from the Ordinariate for Eastern Catholics in Brazil, erected on November 14, 1951. Under these conditions the bishop or eparch is the ordinary of the diocese.

Bishop João Chedid resigned in 1990 by reason of advanced age and poor health and died in Lebanon on 30 July 1991.

The third bishop of the Maronite Church was Joseph Mahfouz who was elected on June 9, 1990, and consecrated on August 12, 1990, in Lebanon. He arrived in Brazil on October 6, 1990, taking possession on the 21st of that month and remained in front of the Maronite Archbishopric of Brazil, retiring after completing 75 years old in December 2006.

The fourth Maronite bishop of Brazil is Dom Edgard Madi who officially assumed the duties of the highest Maronite post in Brazil, on December 10, 2006.

== Status ==
At present, in addition to the cathedral in São Paulo, there are 10 Maronite parishes throughout the country.

== Leadership ==
- João Chedid, O.M.M. (29 November 1971 – 27 February 1988), Archbishop (personal title) (27 February 1988 – 9 June 1990 retired)
- Joseph Mahfouz, O.L.M. (9 June 1990 – 14 October 2006 resigned)
- Edgard Madi (since 14 October 2006)
