= Edgard Madi =

Brazilian Maronite bishop

- Eparch of Our Lady of Lebanon of São Paulo
- Native name: إدغار مادي
- Church: Maronite Church
- Diocese: Eparchy of Our Lady of Lebanon of São Paulo
- Appointed: 14 October 2006
- Predecessor: Joseph Mahfouz

Orders
- Ordination: 14 August 1983
- Consecration: 26 November 2006 by Nasrallah Boutros Sfeir

Personal details
- Born: 23 March 1956 (age 70) Beit Mery, Mount Lebanon Governorate, Lebanon

Edgard Madi or Edgard Amine Madi (born 23 March 1956 in Beit Mery, Lebanon) is the bishop of the Maronite Catholic Eparchy of Our Lady of Lebanon of São Paulo in Brazil.

== Biography ==
Edgard Madi ended his high school and began his studies at Collège Sagesse in Beirut and ecclesiastical studies at Holy Spirit University of Kaslik, Lebanon, between 1977 and 1981. Ordained a priest on August 14, 1983, Madi moved to Boston in the United States where he majored in Education between 1988 and 1991. During his priesthood Madi held the following positions: 1983 to 1984 he was General secretary of the Maronite Synod of Bishops in Beirut; parish priest in Santa Tereza in Mansurieh in Lebanon from 1984 to 1988; priest in the Mar Mikhael Parish in Beirut and Latin Church in Boston from 1988 to 1991.

Between 1991 and 2001, he spent several weeks in Brazil. He speaks Arabic, Portuguese, French and English.

Returning to Holy Spirit University of Kaslik, he obtained a Ph.D. in Philosophy of Education in 2001. Madi was also director in High School for five years and Supervisor of Studies for 10 years; he is also student of Dialogue among Religions, especially among Christian and Islamic religions.

Edgard Madi was appointed bishop to the Maronite Eparchy of São Paulo in November 2006. He succeeded the third bishop Joseph Mahfouz. He was ordained Bishop on November 26, 2006, in Bkerki, the seat of the Maronite Patriarchate in Lebanon by Maronite Patriarch of Antioch, Cardinal Nasrallah Boutros Sfeir, being his co-consecrators Paul Youssef Matar, Maronite Archbishop of Beirut, and Joseph Mahfouz, OLM, former bishop of the Maronite Catholic Eparchy of Our Lady of Lebanon of São Paulo. The possession of the See of the Maronite Bishopric in São Paulo took place on December 10, 2006, with the presence of Bishop Boulos Mattar - Maronite bishop of Beirut and Bishop Emilio Saade - Maronite Bishop of Batroun.

In February 2018, he received the Grand Cross of the Order of Ipiranga, from the State of São Paulo.

Edgar Madi is an honorary citizen of São Paulo (city).
