= Spiridon Mattar =

Egyptian-born Brazilian Melkite Greek Catholic hierarch

- Bishop of Eparchy of Nossa Senhora do Paraíso em São Paulo
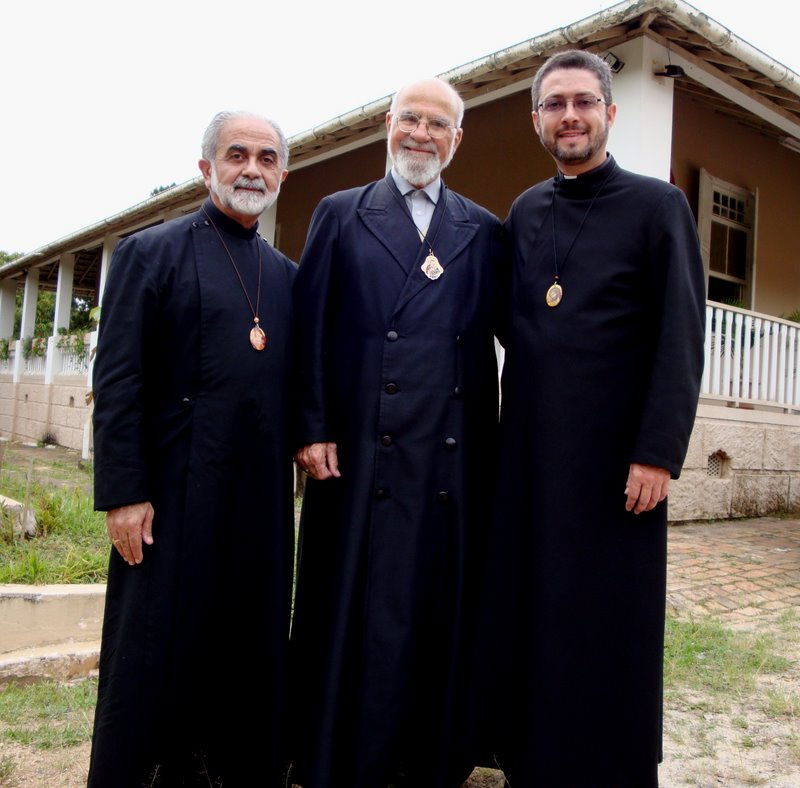
- Bishop Mattar (pictured center)
- Church: Melkite Greek Catholic Church
- See: Eparchy of Nossa Senhora do Paraíso em São Paulo
- In office: 1978–1990
- Predecessor: Elias Coueter
- Successor: Boutros Mouallem

Orders
- Ordination: July 20, 1946 by Maximos IV Sayegh
- Consecration: July 20, 1978 by Maximos V Hakim

Personal details
- Born: March 1, 1921 Alexandria, Egypt
- Died: July 26, 2014 (aged 93) Boa Esperança, Minas Gerais, Brazil

Spiridon Mattar (March 1, 1921 – July 26, 2014) was an Egyptian-born Brazilian Melkite Greek Catholic hierarch of the Melkite Greek Catholic Eparchy of Nossa Senhora do Paraíso em São Paulo.

== Biography ==
Mattar was born in Alexandria, Egypt from Lebanese parents, but grew up in Beirut and was ordained here as a priest on July 20, 1946. He studied theology and philosophy at the Seminary Saint Anne in Jerusalem. He was secretary in the Melkite bishopric in Beirut, Lebanon; Pastor of Our Lady of Providence; Superior of the Saint Basil School; Vicar General in Beirut; President of the Ecclesiastical Court - Patriarchal; Parish priest of Saint John Chrysostom (Chaplain).

Mattar was appointed bishop of the Eparchy of Nossa Senhora do Paraíso em São Paulo on June 22, 1978 and ordained bishop on July 20, 1978; he resigned from the diocese on April 20, 1990.

At the time of his death in 2014 he operated in the Sanctuary of Bom Jesus, in Boa Esperança, Minas Gerais.
