= Joseph Gébara =

- Archeparch of Petra and Philadelphia in Amman
- Native name: چوزيف جباره
- Church: Melkite Greek Catholic Church
- Archdiocese: Archeparchy of Petra and Philadelphia in Amman
- Installed: 20 February 2018
- Term ended: 21 March 2024
- Predecessor: Yasser Ayyash
- Previous posts: Eparch of Nossa Senhora do Paraíso em São Paulo (2014-2018); Coadjutor Eparch of Nossa Senhora do Paraíso em São Paulo (2013-2014)

Orders
- Ordination: 10 July 1993 by Habib Bacha
- Consecration: 21 December 2013 by Gregory III Laham

Personal details
- Born: 10 June 1965 (age 61) Ammatour, Mount Lebanon Governorate, Lebanon

Joseph Gébara (born 10 June 1965 in Amatour, Lebanon) is a Lebanese Catholic archeparch of the Byzantine Rite, and current Archeparch of the Melkite Greek Catholic Archeparchy of Petra and Philadelphia in Amman.

== Biography ==
After his institutional studies, Joseph Gébara obtained a degree in philosophy at the Theological Institute of São Paulo, in Harissa (1995) and a master's degree in theology at the Catholic Institute of Paris (1998) and an Advanced Studies Diploma (DEA) in patristic (2000) and a PhD in history of religions and religious anthropology (2003) from the University of Sorbonne in Paris.

He was ordained a priest for the Melkite Greek Catholic Archeparchy of Beirut and Byblos on 10 July 1993. Gébara performed the pastoral ministry in the Church of Saint Elias in Dekwaneh (1993-1995); during his post-graduate studies in Paris he worked in parishes Saint-Julien-le-Pauvre (1996-1998) and Notre-Dame des Champs in Montparnasse (1998-2003). He returned to Lebanon in 2003, and was appointed parish priest of Notre-Dame Church Hadath Liberation. Gébara was Dean of the third district of Beirut (2006-2011).

Gébara was named coadjutor bishop of the Melkite Greek Catholic Eparchy of Nossa Senhora do Paraíso on 31 October 2013, being consecrated on 21 December by the Greek Melkite Patriarch of Antioch and All the East, Alexandria and Jerusalem Gregory III Laham. He succeeded eparch Fares Maakaroun after his renounce on 21 July 2014.

On 20 February 2018 Pope Francis accepted his election by the Melkite Synod as Archeparch of the Melkite Greek Catholic Archeparchy of Petra and Philadelphia in Amman.

On 21 March 2024, Patriarch Youssef Absi and the Melkite Synod accepted his resignation due to health reasons.

He speaks Arabic and French and knows the classical languages.
