= Maronite Catholic Archeparchy of Tyre =

Eastern Catholic archeparchy in Lebanon

Coordinates: 33.2689°N 35.2164°E

Archeparchy of Tyre (Maronite) Archeparchia Tyrensis Maronitarum
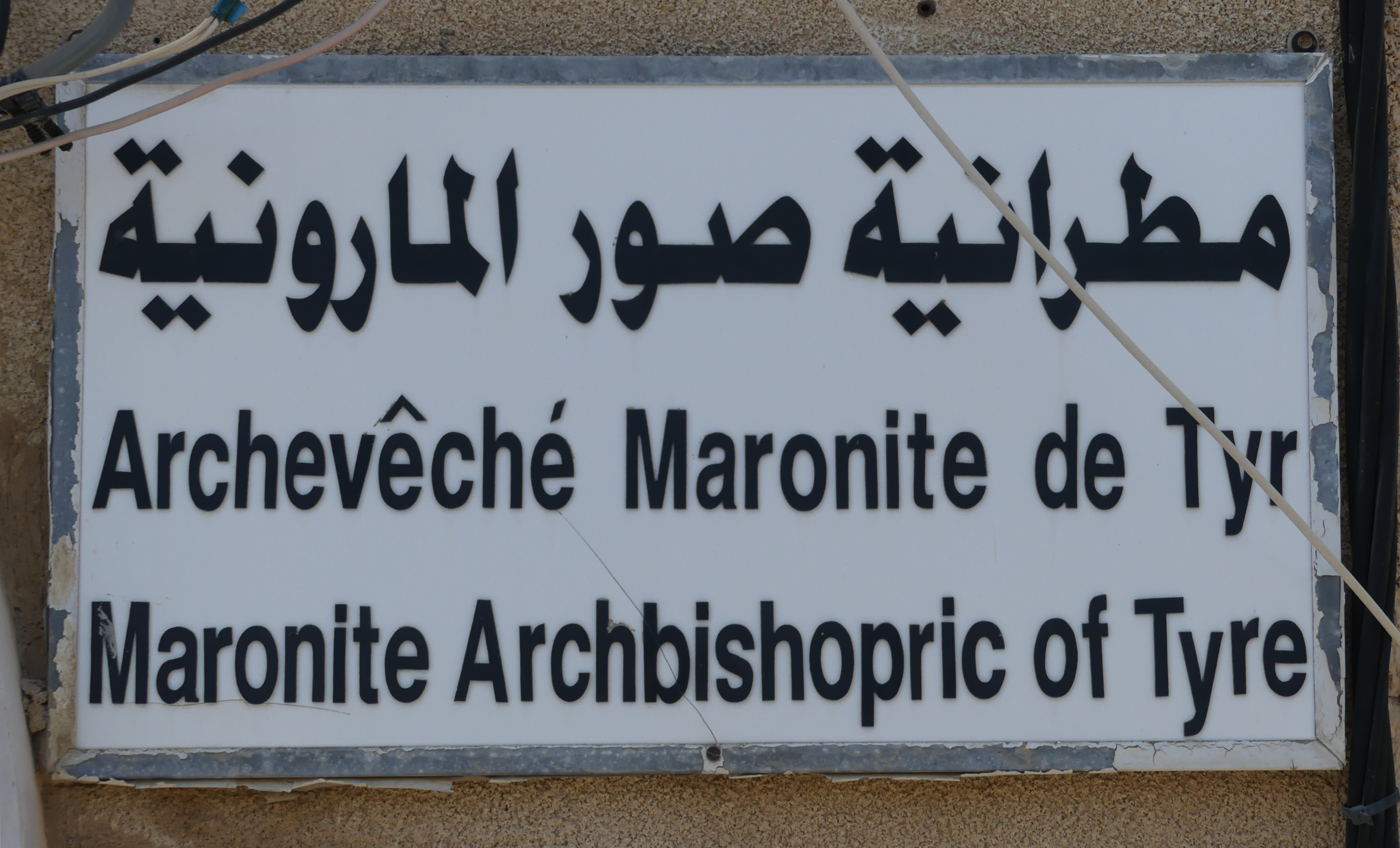

Location
- Country: Lebanon
- Metropolitan: Immediately subject to the Maronite Patriarchate of Antioch

Statistics
- Population: (as of 2014); 42,500 (n/a%)
- Parishes: 22

Information
- Sui iuris church: Maronite
- Rite: West Syro-Antiochene Rite
- Established: 1965

Current leadership
- Pope: Leo XIV
- Patriarch: Bechara Boutros al-Rahi
- Archeparch: Charbel Abdallah

Maronite Catholic Archeparchy of Tyre (in Latin: Archeparchia Tyrensis Maronitarum) is an Archeparchy of the Maronite Church immediately subject to the Maronite Patriarch of Antioch. In 2014 there were 42,500 baptized. It is currently ruled by Archeparch Charbel Abdallah.

== Territory and statistics ==
The archeparchy extends its jurisdiction over the Maronite faithful of Southern Lebanon. Its archeparchial seat is the city of Tyre. The territory of the archeparchy is divided into 22 parishes and in 2014 there were 42,500 Maronite Catholics.

== History ==
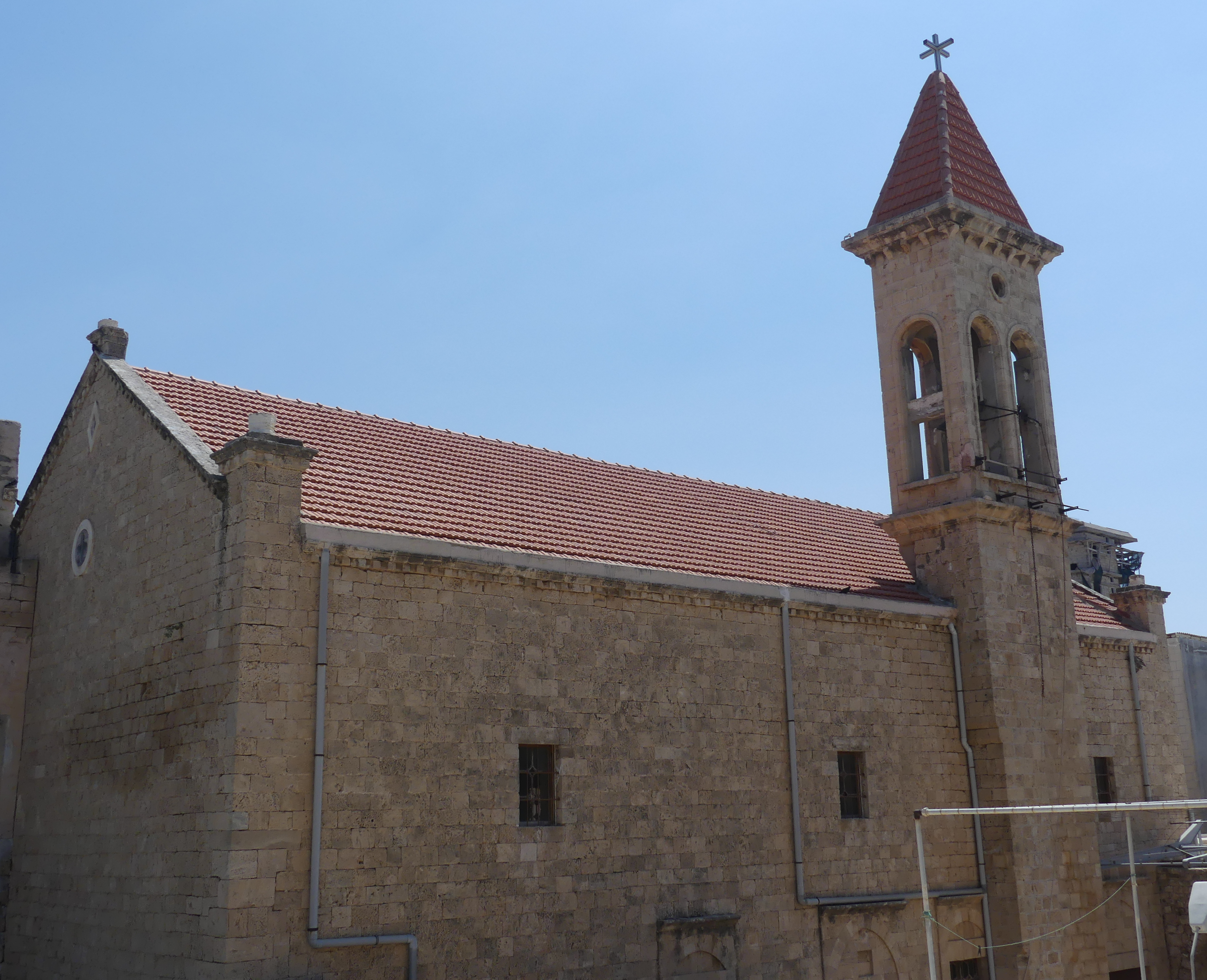
"Our Lady of the Seas", 2019

The eparchy of Tyre, together with that of Sidon, dating back to the dawn of the Maronite Church (5th century). The Synod of Mount Lebanon of 1736 canonically established the Eparchy of Tyre and Sidon, which was the seat of their patriarch from 1819 to 1837. In 1838 Tyre became a separated Eparchy.

In the second half of the 19th century, the Maronite cathedral of "Notre Dame Des Mers" ("Our Lady of the Seas") was constructed near the modern harbour on the foundations of an ancient church. It features a pink marble tabernacle whose foot is encrusted with a black marble anchor.

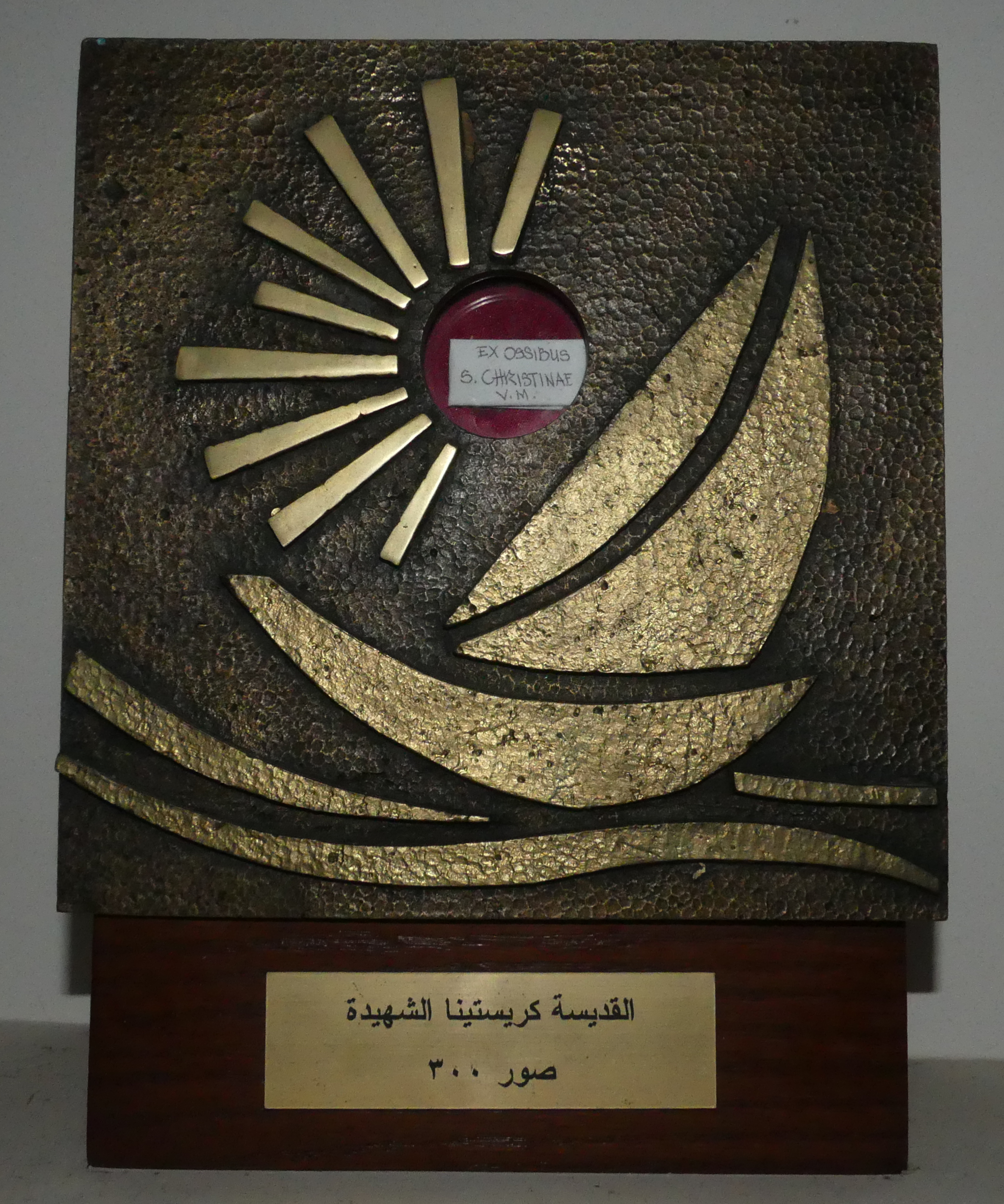
"EX OSSIBUS S. CHRISTINAE"

Pierre Bostani became Archbishop of Tyre on October 5, 1866. Bostani was born in Debbié in November 1819 and ordained a Maronite priest on 12 October 1842. He was quickly called upon by the Archbishop of Tyre who named him as his private secretary. In 1845, Bostani was asked by the Maronite Patriarch to act as his private secretary and Vicar General of the Maronite Patriarchy. On 28 July 1856, Maronite Patriarch Massad named him Coadjutor Archbishop of Tyre and Bishop of Saint-John-Acre. Bostani travelled to Rome in June 1867 where he was named Assistant to the Pontifical Throne by Pope Pius IX on June 17, 1867. He personally headed the Maronite delegation that attended the First Vatican Council in Rome in 1869.

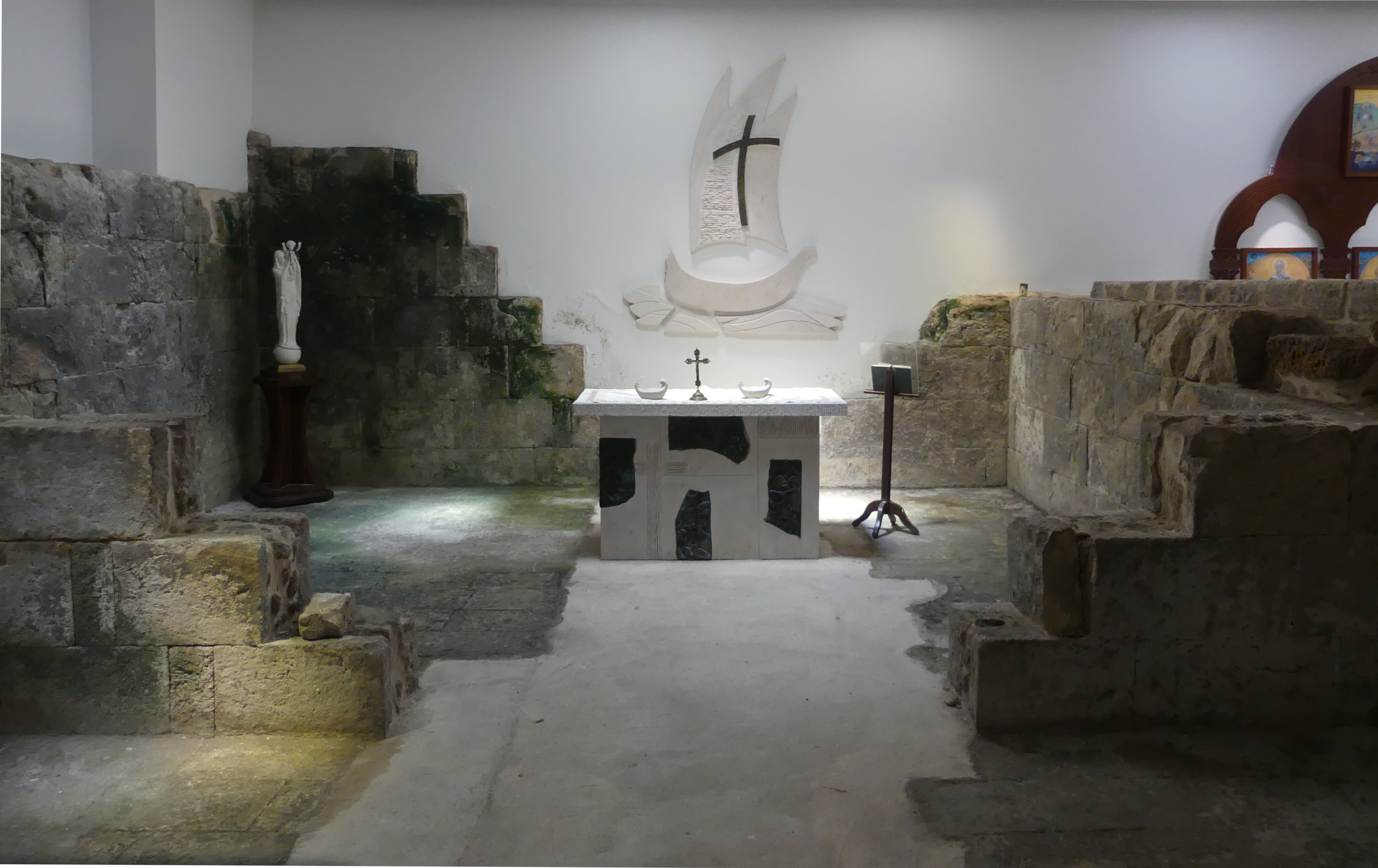
The archaeological site in the basement of the cathedral

In 1965 the eparchy of Tyre was elevated to the rank of Archeparchy.

After the kidnapping of Kevin Joyce, an Irish soldier of the United Nations Interim Force in Lebanon (UNIFIL), by Palestinian militants in April 1981, Archbishop Maroun Khoury Sader worked with the Irish UNIFIL battalion in efforts to recover his remains.

On 8 June 1996, the Archeparchy lost a portion of its territory for the creation of the Maronite Catholic Archeparchy of Haifa and the Holy Land.

In 2005, ancient remains - stone walls as well as terracotta, ivory objects, and paintings - were discovered during excavations underneath the cathedral. According to the Directorate General of Antiquities, it was a Roman-era food store which had been built on the site of a building from the Hellenistic period. It was apparently destroyed in the 6th century by an earthquake.

Next to the archaeological site in the basement is the Sanctuary of the Holy Martyrs of Tyre, which has a number of relics on display, amongst them pieces of bones from Saint Christina of Tyre.

== Eparchs ==
Archbishop Pierre Bostani (1819–1899)

- Ignatius, (before 1736 - after 1746)
- Michael Fadel, (1762 - in 1786 confirmed Archeparch of Beirut)
- Simon Zevain (referred on 25 May 1823), (patriarchal vicar with the title of Tyre)
- Abdallah Bostani (Elbostari), (15 August 1819 - 1837 or 1838) (Patriarchal Vicar with the title of Sidon)
- Abdallah Bostani (Elbostari), (1837 or 1838 - 1866 deceased)
- Pierre Bostani, (October 5, 1866 - November 15, 1899 deceased)
- Paul Basbous, (25 September 1900 consecrated -?)
- Chucrallah Khoury, MLM (31 January 1906 - 11 February 1934 deceased)
- Paul Peter Meouchi, (April 19, 1934 - May 25, 1955 elected patriarch of Antioch)
- Michael Doumith, (April 21, 1956 - December 11, 1959 appointed Bishop of Sarba)
- Joseph Khoury, (11 December 1959–1965)

== Archeparchs ==
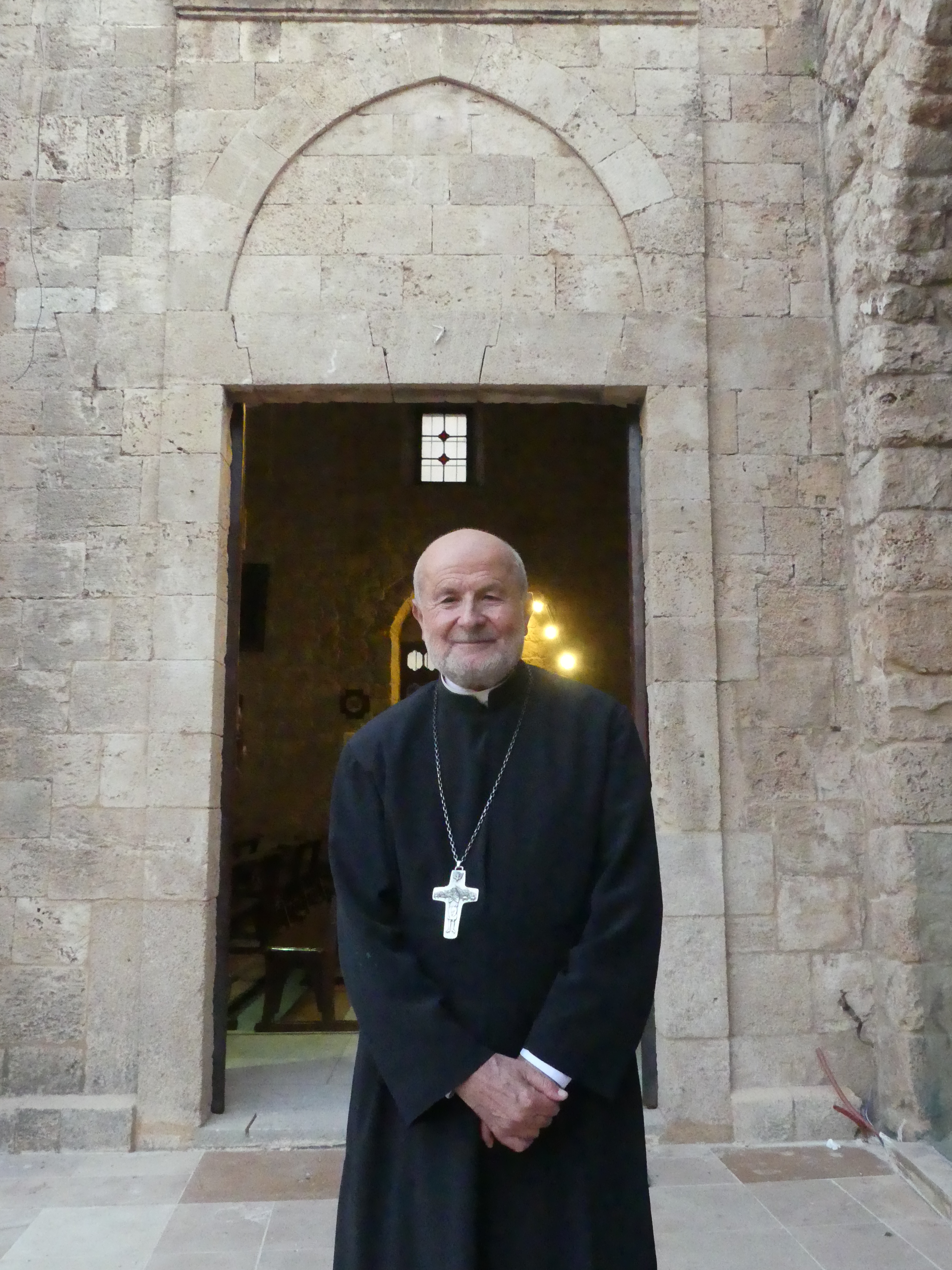
- Archbishop El Hajj in front of the cathedral, 2019
  Joseph Khoury, (1965 - February 5, 1992 deceased)
- Maroun Khoury Sader, (1 June 1992 - 25 September 2003 withdrawn)
- Chucrallah-Nabil El-Hage, (25 September 2003 - 1 November 2020, retired)
- Charbel Abdallah (since 1 November 2020)

== See also ==
- Christianity in Lebanon
