= Tobias El Khazen =

Head of the Maronite Church from 1756 to 1766

Tobias El Khazen; طوبيا الخازن
- Patriarch of Antioch
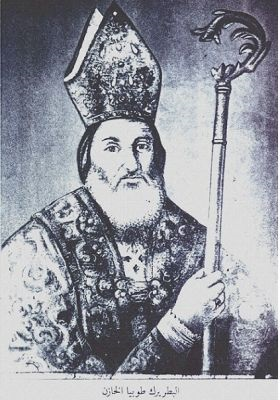
- Church: Maronite Church
- See: Patriarch of Antioch
- Elected: February 28, 1756
- Term ended: May 19, 1766
- Predecessor: Simon Awad
- Successor: Joseph Estephan

Personal details
- Died: May 19, 1766 Ghosta, Lebanon

Ordination history
History
Episcopal consecration
- Consecrated by: Jacob Awad Bishop
Episcopal succession
Bishops consecrated by Tobias El Khazen as principal consecrator
- Choukri Aroutin: 1762
- Michael Fadel: 1762
- Grégoire Sciukrallah Jaroue: 1762

Tobias El Khazen (or Tubiya al-Khazin, Arabic: طوبيا الخازن, Latin: Tobias Alchasen, died 1766) was a former Eparch of the Maronite Catholic Archeparchy of Cyprus, Maronite Catholic Archeparchy of Tripoli and the 62nd Maronite Patriarch of Antioch from 1756 to his death in 1766.

== Life ==
Tobias El Khazen was a member of the Abu Nawfal branch of the Khazen family, which ruled the Keserwan District, and he was a nephew of Patriarch Joseph Dergham El Khazen. He entered in the Lebanese Maronite Order. In 1733, when his uncle became patriarch, Tobias was appointed administrator of the Patriarchal residence of Qannubin Monastery, in the Kadisha Valley, and appointed titular bishop of Naplouse. On February 12, 1733, El Khazen was ordained bishop by Maronite Patriarch of Antioch Jacob Awad. In 1736 he was appointed bishop of the Maronite Catholic Archeparchy of Cyprus, and with this title he participated in the 1736 Maronite Synod of Mount Lebanon.

In 1743 at the death of his uncle Patriarch Joseph Dergham Khazen, after the initial refusal of Simon Awad, Tobias in competition with Elias Mohasseb tried to be elected patriarch, but the case came to the Pope who chose Simon Awad in place of the two pretenders. In 1750 Tobias was appointed bishop of Tyre and Vice-Patriarch. In 1755 he was appointed Eparch of Tripoli and at the death of Simon Awad, Tobias succeeded at being elected patriarch on February 28, 1756. He was confirmed by Pope Benedict XIV on March 28, 1757.

The new patriarch placed his residence in Kisrawan, particularly in the monastery of Mar Rouhana.

As patriarch, Tobias had three main issues to manage: the implementation of the 1736 Maronite Synod, the Hindiyya case and the problems in the Lebanese Maronite Order. To implement the 1736 Synod he summoned a new synod on August 25, 1756, without great results, and again another synod in 1762 which reduced the dioceses only to fifteen, not eight as requested in 1736. About Hindiyya he took a neutral position, which allowed Hindiyya to grow her influence during his patriarchate. The dispute over the Lebanese Maronite Order could be solved only under his successor, Joseph Estephan, when in 1770 it was divided into two branches, giving rise to OMM. Tobias El Khazen died on May 19, 1766.

== See also ==
- List of Maronite Patriarchs
- Maronite Church

== Sources ==
- Pierre Dib, v. Maronite (Eglise), https://archive.org/stream/dictionnairedet10pt1vaca#page/n53/mode/2up , Tome Dixième, première partie, Paris 1928, col. 91.
- Giuseppe Simone Assemani, https://archive.org/stream/serieschronologi00asseuoft#page/40/mode/2up , Rome 1881, p. 40.
- Konrad Eubel, Hierarchia Catholica Medii Aevi, https://archive.org/stream/hierarchiacathol06eubeuoft#page/87/mode/1up, p. 87.
- K. Rizk, Khazen Thobie, in Dictionnaire d'histoire et de géographie ecclésiastiques, 28 (2003), pp. 1425-1426.
