= Simon Awad =

Head of the Maronite Church from 1743 to 1756

Simon VII Awad (سمعان السابع عوّاد)
- Patriarch of Antioch
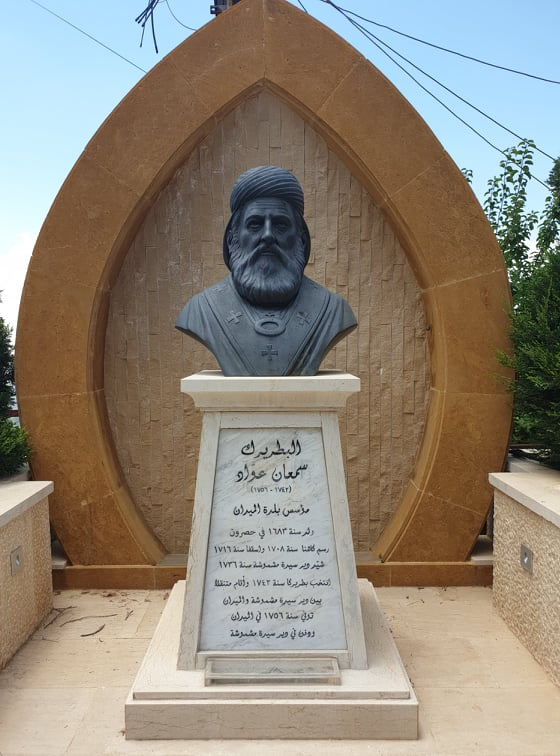
- Bust of Simon Awad in El Midane Jezzine Lebanon
- Church: Maronite Church
- See: Patriarch of Antioch
- Appointed: March 16, 1743
- Installed: October 11, 1743
- Term ended: February 12, 1756
- Predecessor: Joseph Dergham El Khazen
- Successor: Tobias El Khazen

Orders
- Ordination: June 10, 1708 (Priest)
- Consecration: January 27, 1716 (Bishop) by Jacob Awad

Personal details
- Born: 1683 Hasroun, Lebanon
- Died: February 12, 1756 (aged 72–73) El Midane, Lebanon

Simon VII Awad (or Sim'an Awwad, Auwad, Aouad, Arabic: سمعان السابع عوّاد, Latin: Simeon Evodius, born in 1683 in Hasroun, Lebanon – died on February 12, 1756, in El Midane, Lebanon), was the 61st Maronite Patriarch of Antioch from 1743 to his death in 1756.

== Life ==
Simon Awad was born in 1683 in Hasroun, Lebanon. From 1696 to 1707 he studied in Rome and at his return in Lebanon, on June 10, 1708, he was ordained as a priest by his uncle Jacob Awad, Maronite Patriarch of Antioch, who reigned from 1705 to 1733, and whom he served as secretary. On January 27, 1716, he was consecrated bishop of Damascus, always by his uncle. Simon Awad played a leading role in the 1736 Maronite Synod of Mount Lebanon.

At the death of Patriarch Joseph Khazen, who died on May 13, 1742, the bishops who attended the funeral met and elected Simon Awad as Patriarch, but Simon refused out of humility. So the bishops elected the bishop of Arka, Elias Mohasseb. Bishops Tobias El Khazen and Ignace Chrabai were absent from the meeting, perhaps not invited, and opposed the election of Elias. These two bishops ordained two new bishops and held a new election among themselves, electing Tobias El Khazen as Patriarch and splitting the Church.

Pope Benedict XIV took the task to study the deal to a special commission of cardinals, which reached its findings on February 15, 1743. Based on this, the pope took his decisions, expressed in brief Quod not humana of 13 March 1743 The next day the pope addressed to the Maronite episcopate his brief Magna non minus to reassure that this extraordinary decision did not affect in any case the future, prerogatives and the independence of the Maronite Church. Finally, on March 16, 1743, to keep the Church united, the Papal brief Nuper nos, Benedict XIV named the archeparch of Damascus, Simon Awad, new Maronite patriarch in place of the two pretenders.

The Franciscan Giacomo of Lucca, was charged with the brief Nuper to sedendas, to give effect to the Roman decisions. On October 7, 1743, the Maronite episcopate met in the convent of Harissa and accepted unanimously Benedict XIV's choices; and on October 11 of the same year, the new Patriarch was solemnly enthroned. Giuseppe Simone Assemani was instructed to ask the Pope to give the pallium to the patriarch and he received the pallium from the Pope on July 3, 1744.

The new patriarch left the habitual residence in the monastery of Santa Maria of Qannubin to reside permanently in the village of El-Midane (Jezzine District), near the monastery of Our Lady of Machmoucheh, which he helped to build in 1730.

In the years immediately following his appointment, Simon Awad faced an attempted revolt by some bishops, who did not accept the way of the papal decisions. Benedict XIV designated the Franciscan Desire Casabasciana, of the Custody of the Holy Land, to restore order and peace in the Maronite Church. Simon Awad summoned a Maronite synod on November 28–30, 1755 at Qannubin Monastery, in obedience to the pope's letter, held a synod for the implementation of the decisions of the Maronite Synod of Mount-Lebanon of 1736, which had fifteen canons and legally organized the Maronite Church dividing it in dioceses and had introduced important new disciplines but it did not implement its decrees. This new synod did not satisfy the expectations of Rome.

During the patriarchate of Simon Awad, he began to examine the case of religious, mystical and visionary Hindiyya al-'Ujaimi, whose reputation for holiness had spread throughout Lebanon and the Maronite Church. Educated by the Jesuits, who initially supported her, she had the support of many bishops and even the patriarch, after an inquiry ordered by him. Simon ordered initially an internal investigation, and based on its results he sided with Hindiyya. The complaints against the nun went on anyway, and on 1752 Pope Benedict XIV ordered an inspection, carried out by a Franciscan, Desiderio da Casabasciana, who, initially hostile, became himself a supporter of Hindiyya. The case was brought by the Jesuits in Rome: with brief Ad supremam(4 January 1742), the Pope disapproved of the attitude of the patriarch in favor of Hindiyya, suppressed her religious congregation that she founded and ordered his transfer to another monastery. Subsequently, ordered an investigation into the visions and writings of this religious, according to declaration promulgated in January 1755 by Propaganda Fide condemned as "overt illusions" the visions, ecstasies and revelations of Hindiyya. The problem was revisited years later, with the following two patriarchs.

Simon Awad also distinguished himself as a writer in Arabic. Among his works are mentioned in particular: a compendium of theology (1706), a manual of moral theology (1707), a pastoral instruction in three chapters, a biblical commentary of Old and the New Testament, the first biography of the Patriarch Estephan El Douaihy and a history of the Patriarchs of the East-written with Giuseppe Simone Assemani.

Simon Awad died on February 12, 1756, in El-Midane (Jezzine District) where he lived most of his life and where he founded the monastery of the Our Lady of Machmoucheh, in which he was buried.

== Works ==
Simon Awad is remembered as an Arabic writer. His main works are:

- a Theological Compendium published on October 6, 1706
- a Handbook of Moral Theology published in 1707
- a Pastoral instruction in three parts
- an Explanation of the Old and New Testament
- the first biography of Patriarch Estephan El Douaihy
- a History of the Patriarchs of the Orient written together with Giuseppe Simone Assemani

== See also ==
- List of Maronite Patriarchs
- Maronite Church
