= Philip Gemayel =

Head of the Maronite Church from 1795 to 1796

Philip Gemayel فيليبس الجميّل
- Patriarch of Antioch
- Church: Maronite Church
- See: Patriarch of Antioch
- Elected: June 14, 1795
- Term ended: April 12, 1796
- Predecessor: Michael Fadel
- Successor: Joseph Tyan

Orders
- Consecration: (Bishop) December 1767 by Joseph Estephan

Personal details
- Born: 1740 Bikfaya, Lebanon
- Died: 12 April 1796 (aged 55–56) Bkerké, Lebanon

Philip Gemayel (born in 1740 in Bikfaya, Lebanon – died on April 12, 1796, in Bkerké, Lebanon) (or Filibus Al-Jumayyil, Philibos Gemaiel, Arabic: فيليبس الجميّل) was the 65th Maronite Patriarch of Antioch for a few months in 1795–1796.

== Life ==
Philip Gemayel was born in Bikfaya, Lebanon about 1740. He was consecrated coadjutor bishop, titular of Listra, in December 1767 by Patriarch Joseph Estephan for the Maronite diocese of Cyprus ruled by his old uncle Elias Gemayel, to whom he succeeded as bishop in 1786. He, as his predecessors, used to reside in Lebanon.

Philip Gemayel was elected Patriarch on June 14, 1795. His election was opposed by some bishops; the ones nearer to the previous Patriarch Joseph Estephan died in 1793, i.e. Joseph Tyan, John Helou and Joseph Najm (or Nujaym). Philip Gemayel asked the Vatican for confirmation, writing a request with twelve propositions. But he died a few months later, on April 12, 1796, before getting his answer. Pope Pius VI, unaware of Gemayel's death, confirmed his election on June 27, 1796.

== See also ==
- List of Maronite Patriarchs
- Maronite Church

== Sources ==
- Pierre Dib, v. Maronite (Eglise), https://archive.org/stream/dictionnairedet10pt1vaca#page/n57/mode/2up, Tome Dixième, première partie, Paris 1928, col. 101.
- Giuseppe Simone Assemani, https://archive.org/stream/serieschronologi00asseuoft#page/40/mode/2up, Roma 1881, p. 41.
- Konrad Eubel, Hierarchia Catholica Medii Aevi, https://archive.org/stream/hierarchiacathol06eubeuoft#page/87/mode/1up, p. 87.
