= Abdallah Qara'ali =

The Most Reverend Abdallah Qara'ali, OLM
- Archeparch of Beirut
- Church: Syriac Maronite Church of Antioch
- Installed: 17 September 1716
- Term ended: 6 January 1742
- Predecessor: Georges Khairallah Istifan
- Successor: Youhanna Estephan

Orders
- Ordination: 1696
- Consecration: 17 September 1716 by Patriarch Jacob IV Awad

Personal details
- Born: 8 September 1672 Mount Lebanon Emirate, Ottoman Empire
- Died: 6 January 1742 (aged 69)
- Buried: Monastery of Our Lady of Luwayza
- Occupation: Jurist, religious founder, eparch

Abdallah Qara'ali, OLM (8 September 1672 – 6 January 1742) was a Lebanese renowned jurist and prelate of the Syriac Maronite Church of Antioch, better known as the Maronite Catholic Church. He served as Archeparch of Beirut from 1716 until his death in 1742, but is also known as a cofounder of the Lebanese Maronite Order.

== Biography ==
=== Early life and priesthood ===
Qara'ali was born on 8 September 1672 in the Mount Lebanon Emirate, an autonomous subdivision of the Ottoman Empire covering roughly what is now the modern state of Lebanon. He was ordained a priest in 1696.

In 1694, he, along with two other men, established the Lebanese Maronite Order. He served as the order's Superior General from 1699 to 1716.

=== Episcopacy ===
On 17 September 1716, Qara'ali was consecrated Archeparch of Beirut, making him the first member of the Lebanese Maronites to ascend to the prelature. Patriarch Jacob IV Awad, Patriarch of Antioch served as the principal consecrator.

As archeparch, he played an important role in the Lebanese Council of 1736. This synod canonically established the Maronite episcopal sees, including that of Beirut.

Qara'ali was a renowned jurist in his time, and is noted in legal circles for his significant work Mukhtasar al-shari'a, a nomocanon in the Maronite Catholic tradition. While its contents are not radical for its time period, and in fact were in line with common Middle Eastern legal practices, it is noted for its unique combination of Roman, Islamic, and Christian influences.

Qara'ali died in 1742 and was buried at the Luwayzah Monastery, the location where the Lebanese Council had taken place.

== Episcopal lineage ==
- Patriarch Youhanna Bawwab el-Safrawi
- Patriarch George Rizqallah Beseb’ely (1656)
- Patriarch Estephan El Douaihy (1668)
- Patriarch Jacob IV Awad (1698)
- Archeparch Abdallah Qara'ali (1716)

== Writings ==
- Mukhtasar al-shari'a (in Arabic). Beirut, Lebanon. 1720.

Written in 1720, Qara'ali's Mukhtasar is a Maronite Catholic nomocanon, or collection of ecclesiastical laws. While modeled after a Syro-Roman nomocanon compounded by Ibn al-'Assal, it was also highly influenced by Sunni Islamic sharia law and did not stray far from the general legal patterns of the Middle East at that time.
