= List of Maronite patriarchs of Antioch =

This is a list of the Maronite patriarchs of Antioch and all the East, the primate of the Maronite Church, one of the Eastern Catholic Churches. Starting with Youssef Dergham before 1736, after becoming patriarch of the Maronite Catholic Patriarchate of Antioch, they assume the name "Peter" (Boutros in Arabic, بطرس), after the traditional first bishop of Antioch, St. Peter, who was also the head of the Apostles. The official title that the Maronite patriarch assumes is "Patriarch of Antioch and All the East". To this date 15 patriarchs have been canonized by the Catholic Church, with an extra two being beatified but not yet canonized.

For the patriarchs of Antioch before John Maron, see List of Patriarchs of Antioch.

== List of patriarchs of Antioch and all the Levant of the Maronite Church ==
A famous list of Maronite patriarchs of Antioch was written and published by Giuseppe Simone Assemani, and Simon Awad, which follows the Series of Maronite Patriachs written by Patriarch Estephan El Douaihy in the 17th century, but it is incomplete for the first centuries. Besides the Assemani's list, another more detailed list was written in Bejjeh in 1766 by Georges Saad.

In the list here below the names shifted on the right are not included in the incomplete Assemani's list and derive from the Bejjeh list.

=== Patriarchs of Antioch before the Maronite-Greek schism, 1st century–686 ===
Order	Name of Patriarch	Period	Notes
1	St. Peter	(c. 44–c. 53)	
2	St. Evodius	(c. 53–c. 69)	
3	St. Ignatius	(c. 70–c. 108)	Who was martyred in the reign of Trajan. His seven epistles are unique sources for the early Church.
4	St. Heron	(107–127)	
5	Cornelius	(127–154)	
6	Eros	(154–169)	
7	St. Theophilus	(c. 169–c. 182)	
8	Maximus I of Antioch	(182–191)	
9	St. Serapion	(191–211)	
10	St. Asclepiades the Confessor	(211–220)	
11	Philetus	(220–231)	
12	Zebinnus	(231–237)	
13	St. Babylas the Martyr	(237–c. 250)	Who, according to Nicephorus, was martyred in the reign of Decius.
14	Fabius	(253–256)	
15	Demetrius	(256–260)	Who was taken captive by the Persians under Shapur
16	Paul of Samosata	(260–268)	Was supported by Zenobia, deposed by Emperor Aurelian; in Paul's time Lucian of Antioch was head of the Antiochene catechetical school.
17	Domnus I	(268/9–273/4)	Was supported by Emperor Aurelian.
18	Timaeus	(273/4–282)	
19	Cyril	(283–303)	
20	Tyrannion	(304–314)	
21	Vitalius	(314–320)	
22	Philogonius	(320–323)	
23	St. Eustathius	(324–330)	
24	Paulinus I	(330, six months)	Formerly bishop of Tyre, Semi-Arian and friend of Eusebius of Caesarea.
25	Eulalius	(331–332)	
26	Euphronius	(332–333)	
27	Flacillus or Facellius	(333–342)	In whose time renovations were made to the great church of Antioch, according to Nicephorus.
28	Stephen I	(342–344)	Arian and opponent of Athanasius of Alexandria, deposed in 344.
29	Leontius the Eunuch	(344–358)	Arian.
30	Eudoxius	(358–359)	Formerly bishop of Germanicia, later (360–370) bishop of Constantinople, Homoian.
31	Anianus	(359)	Immediately deposed.
32	St. Meletius	(360/1–362)	Semi-Arian, deposed in the reign of Valens for Homoiousian leanings.
33	Paulinus II	(362–388)	
34	Evagrius	(388–393)	
35	St. Flavian I	(399–404)	
36	Porphyrus	(404–412)	
37	Alexander	(412–417)	He ended the schism with the Eustathians in 415.
38	Theodotus	(417–428)	(alternately 420–429)
39	John I	(428–442)	Condemned the First Council of Ephesus in the Nestorian controversy.
40	Domnus II	(442–449)	Deposed by the Second Council of Ephesus.
41	Maximus II	(449–455)	Appointed by Emperor Theodosius II, accepted the Council of Chalcedon, deposed under unclear circumstances.
42	Basil of Antioch	(456–458)	Chalcedonian.
43	Acacius of Antioch	(458–461)	Chalcedonian.
44	Martyrius	(461–470)	Chalcedonian, deposed by general Zeno.
45	Julian	(471–476)	Chalcedonian, exiled by Peter the Fuller.
46	Stephen II	(477–479)	Chalcedonian.
47	Calendion	(479–before 488)	Chalcedonian, opposed the Henoticon, exiled by Zeno, replaced by Peter the Fuller.
48	Palladius	(488–498)	Chalcedonian, accepted the Henoticon.
49	St. Flavian II	(498–518)	Chalcedonian, accepted the Henoticon, deposed by Emperor Anastasius I.
50	Paul II the Jew	(518–521)	
51	Euphrasius	(521–528)	
52	St. Ephrem of Amid	(528–546)	
53	Domnus III	(546–561)	
54	Anastasius I	(561–571/594)	
55	Gregory I	(571–594/599)	Brief interruption by Anastasius I of Antioch in 594.
56	St. Anastasius II	(599–610)	
57	Gregory II	(610–620)	
58	Anastasius III	(620–628)	
59	Macedonius	(639–662)	
60	George I	(662–669)	
61	Macarius	(669–681)	
62	Theophanes	(681–684)	
	Sede Vacante	(684–686)	

=== Patriarchs during the Marada states, 686–1099 ===
Order	Name of Patriarch		Notes
Order	English	Arabic	Notes
63	St. John Maron I	مار يوحنا مارون الأول	63rd after Saint Peter. First of the Maronite patriarchs (b. 628, consecrated 686, d. 707)
64	Cyrus	قوروش	Son of Saint John Maron's sister
65	Gabriel I	جبرائيل الأول	Last patriarch to reside in Kfarhi monastery
66	John Maron II	يوحنا مارون الثاني	Also known as John Maron II. At this point the Patriarchate moved to Yanou', Byblos
67	John II	يوحنا الثاني	Originating from Byblos, also known as John I (or John III considering John Maron I and John Maron II)
68	Gregory II	غريغوريوس الثاني	-
69	Stephen III	اسطفانوس الثالث	-
70	Mark	مرقس	-
71	Eusebius	أوسابيوس	Also known as Hoaushab (حوشب)
72	John III	يوحنا الثالث	Also known as John II of Hama (or John IV considering Youhanna Maron, Youhanna Maron II and Youhanna I). During his reign, the Fourth Council of Constantinople convened in the year 869
73	Joshua I	يشوع الأول	
74	David I	داوود الأول	-
75	Gregory III	غريغوريوس الثالث	-
76	Theophylact	ثاوفيلكتوس	Also known as Habib or John V Habib
77	Joshua II	يشوع الثاني	Yeshu II of Damascus
78	Domitius	ضوميطيوس	Domitius of Beirut
79	Isaac	اسحق	-
80	John IV	يوحنا الرابع	Also known as John III (John VI)
81	Simeon I	شمعون الأول	Also known as Semaan (سمعان)
82	Jeremiah I	إرميا الأول	Also known as Jeremiah I
83	John V	يوحنا الخامس	Also known as John IV (John VII)
84	Simeon II	شمعون الثاني	-
85	Simeon III	شمعون الثالث	-

=== Patriarchs during the Crusades, 1099–1305 ===
Order	Name of Patriarch		Birthplace	Period	Position	Notes
Order	English	Arabic	Birthplace	Period	Position	Notes
86	Joseph I Al-Jirjissi	يوسف الأول الجرجسي	-	1100–1120	-	First contact with the Crusaders
87	Peter II	بطرس الأول	-	1120–1130	-	Patriarchate moves to Mayfuq, Byblos
88	Gregory IV	غريغوريوس الرابع	Halat, Byblos	1130–1141	-	-
89	Jacob I	يعقوب الأول	Ramat, Batroun	1141–1151	-	-
90	John VI	يوحنا السادس	Lehfed, Byblos	1151–1154	-	Also known as John V (John VIII)
91	Peter III	بطرس الثالث	-	1154–1173	-	-
92	Peter IV	بطرس الرابع	-	1173–1189	-	-
93	Peter VI	بطرس الخامي	-	1189–1199	-	-
94	Jeremiah II Amsheeti	إرميا الثاني العمشيتي	Amsheet, Byblos	1199–1230	-	Also known as Jeremiah II. Took part in the Fourth Lateran Council in Rome
95	Daniel I	دانيال الأول	Shamat, Byblos	1230–1239	-	-
96	John VII	يوحنا السابع	Jaj, Byblos	1239–1245	-	Also known as John VI (John IX)
97	Simeon IV	سمعان الرابع	Bilaouza Jibbet	1245–1277	-	-
98	Jacob II	يعقوب الثاني	-	1277–1278	-	Also known as Jacob II
99	Daniel II	دانيال الثاني	Hadchit, Bsharri	1278–1282	-	-
100	Luke	لوقا	Benahran, Koura	1282–????	-	Schism and two rival patriarchs
101	Jeremiah III	إرميا الثالث	Demalsa, Byblos	1283–1297	-	Also known as Jeremiah III

=== Patriarchs during the Mamluk rule, 1305–1516 ===
Order	Name of Patriarch		Birthplace	Period	Position	Notes
Order	English	Arabic	Birthplace	Period	Position	Notes
102	Simeon V	شمعون الخامس	-	1297–1339	Bishop of Cyprus	-
103	John VIII	يوحنا الثامن	Aqura, Byblos	1339–1357	-	Also known as John VII
104	Gabriel II	جبرائيل الثاني	Hjoula, Byblos	1357–1367	-	Martyred at the hand of the Mamluks
105	David II	داوود الثاني	-	1367–1404	-	-
106	John IX El-Jaji	يوحنا الثامن الجاجي	Jaj, Byblos	1404–1445	Patriarchal emissary (نائب بطريركي)	Also known as John VIII. At this time the Patriarchate moved to Qannoubine
107	Jacob III El-Hadathi	يعقوب الثالث الحدثي	Hadath El Jebbeh, Besharri	1445–1468	Bishop of Mar. Yohanna, Besharri	Also known as Jacob of Hadath
108	Joseph II El-Hadathi	يوسف الثاني الحدثي	Hadath El Jebbeh, Besharri	1468–1492	Patriarchal emissary (نائب بطريركي)	Known as Joseph of Hadath and Ibn Hassan

=== Patriarchs during the Ottomans, 1516–1918 ===
Order	Name of Patriarch			Birthplace	Period	Position	Notes
Order	Portrait	English	Arabic	Birthplace	Period	Position	Notes
109		Simeon VI El-Hadathi	سمعان السادس الحدثي	Hadath El Jebbeh, Besharri	1492–1524	Patriarchal emissary (نائب بطريركي)	-
110		Moses Saade	موسى سعادة	Kafroun, Akkar	1524–1567	Bishop of Sayyde and Houqa	-
111		Michael I Rizzi	ميخائيل الأول الرزي	Bkoufa, Ehden	1567–1581	Bishop of Mar; Antonios Kozhaya	-
112		Sergius Rizzi	سركيس الرزي	Bkoufa, Ehden	1581–1597	Patriarchal emissary	-
113		Joseph III El-Rizzi	يوسف الثالث الرزي	Bkoufa, Ehden	1597–1608	Patriarchal emissary	-
114		John X Makhlouf	يوحنا العاشر مخلوف	Ehden, Zghorta	1608–1633	Patriarchal emissary	Also known as John IX
115		George II Omaira	جرجس (جورج) الثاني عميرة	Ehden, Zghorta	1633–1644	Bishop of Ehden	-
116		Joseph IV Halib El Akoury	يوسف الرابع حليب	Aqoura, Byblos	1644–1648	Bishop of Saida and Sour	-
117		John XI El-Bawwab	يوحنا الحادي عشر البواب	Safra, Keserwan	1648–1656	Patriarchal emissary	Also known as John X
118		George III Beseb'ely	جرجس (جورج) الثالث البسبعلي	Sebaal, Zghorta	1656–1670	Patriarchal emissary	-
119		Bl. Stephen IV El-Douaihy	اسطفانوس الرابع الدويهي	Ehden, Zghorta	1670–1704	Bishop of Cyprus	
120		Gabriel III	جبرائيل الثالث	Blouzan, Keserwan	1704–1705	Bishop of Aleppo	Also known as Gabriel II of Blaouza
121		Jacob IV Awad	يعقوب الرابع عوّاد	Hasroun, Bsharri	1705–1733	Bishop of Tripoli	-
122		Joseph V El-Khazen	يوسف الخامس الخازن	Jounieh, Keserwan	1733–1742	Bishop of Ghosta	
123		Simeon VII Awad	سمعان السابع عوّاد	Hasroun, Bsharri	1742–1756	Bishop of Damascus	-
124		Tobias El Khazen	طوبيا الخازن	Beqaata, Keserwan	1756–1766	Bishop of Cyprus	-
125		Joseph VI Estephan	يوسف السادس اسطفان	Ghosta, Keserwan	1766–1793	Bishop of Beirut	-
126		Michael II Fadel	ميخائيل الثاني فاضل	Beirut	1793–1795	Bishop of Beirut	-
127		Philip Gemayel	فيليبس الجميّل	Bikfaya, Metn	1795–1796	Bishop of Cyprus	-
128		Joseph VII Tyan	يوسف السابع تيّان	Beirut	1796–1809	Bishop of Damascus; ونائب بطريركي	-
129		John XII Helou	يوحنا الثاني عشر الحلو	Ghosta, Keserwan	1809–1823	Bishop of Haifa; ونائب بطريركي	-
130		Joseph VIII Hobaish	يوسف الثامن حبيش	Sahel Alma, Keserwan	1823–1845	Bishop of Tripoli	Patriarchate moved to Bkerke
131		Joseph IX El Khazen	يوسف التاسع الخازن	Ajaltoun, Keserwan	1845–1854	Bishop of Tripoli	1845 events
132		Paul III Peter Massad	بولس الثالث بطرس مسعد	Ashqout, Keserwan	1854–1890	Patriarchal emissary (نائب بطريركي)	1860 events, since his election "Peter" was added to the patriarcal nouns.
133		John XIII Peter El Hajj	يوحنا الثالث عشر بطرس الحاج	Dlebya, Batroun	1890–1898	Bishop of Baalbek	-

=== Patriarch during modern Lebanon, 1918–present ===
Order	Name of Patriarch			Birthplace	Period	Position	Notes
Order	Portrait	English	Arabic	Birthplace	Period	Position	Notes
134		Bl. Elias Peter Hoayek	الياس بطرس الحويّك	Halta, Batroun	1898–1931	Bishop of Haifa; نائب بطريركي	Birth of Greater Lebanon
135		Anthony I Peter Arida	أنطونيوس الأول بطرس عريضة	Becharri	1931–1955	Bishop of Tripoli	-
136		Paul IV Peter Meouchi	بولس الرابع بطرس المعوشي	Jezzine	1955–1975	Bishop of Sour (Tyre)	Cardinal of the Catholic Church
137		Anthony II Peter Khoraish	أنطونيوس الثاني بطرس خريش	Ain Ebel, Bint Jbeil	1975–1986	نائب بطريركي	Abdicated, Cardinal of the Catholic Church
138		Nasrallah Peter Sfeir	نصرالله بطرس صفير	Rayfoun, Kesrwan	1986–2011	Bishop of Sarba and Damascus	Abdicated Patriarch Emeritus, Cardinal of the Catholic Church
139		Bechara Peter Al-Rahi	بشارة بطرس الراعي	Hemlaya, Metn	2011–present	Bishop of Byblos	Incumbent Patriarch, Cardinal of the Catholic Church

== Gallery ==
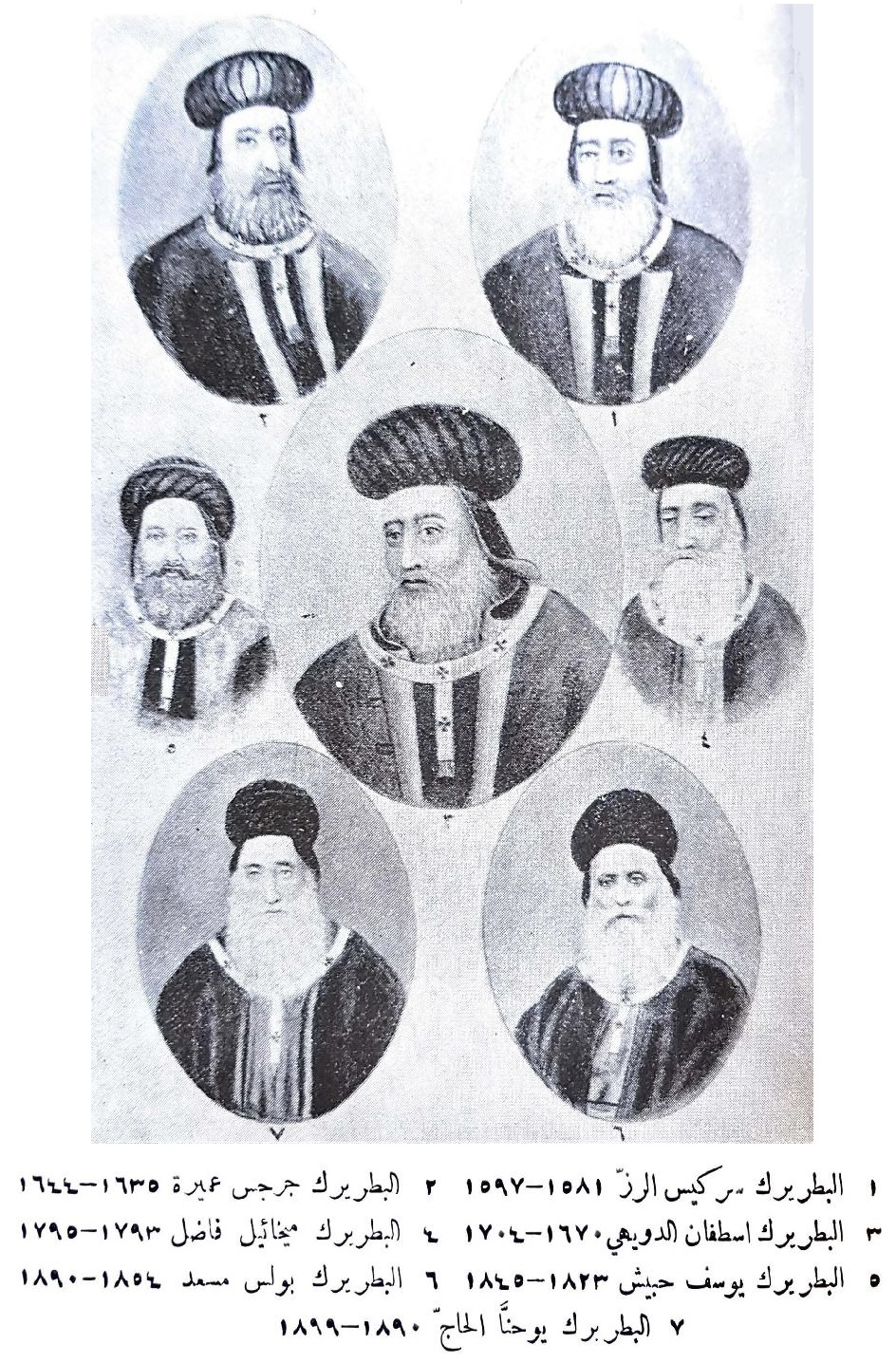
Maronite Patriarchs

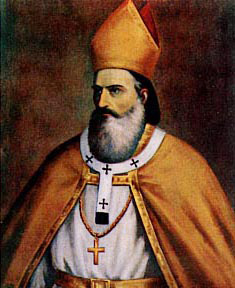
Estephanus II El Douaihy (1670–1704)

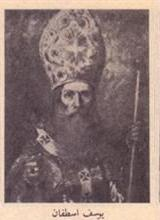
Youssef VI Estephan (1766–1793)

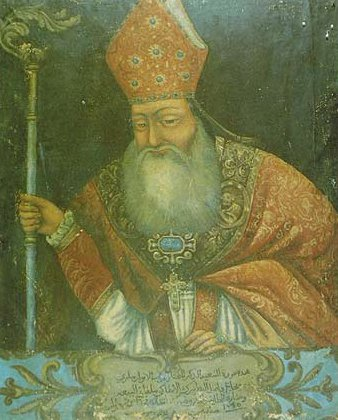
Mikhail II Fadel (1793–1795)

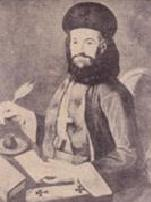
Youssef VII Tyan (1796–1809)

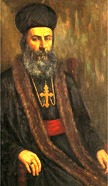
Youhanna XI Helou (1809–1823)

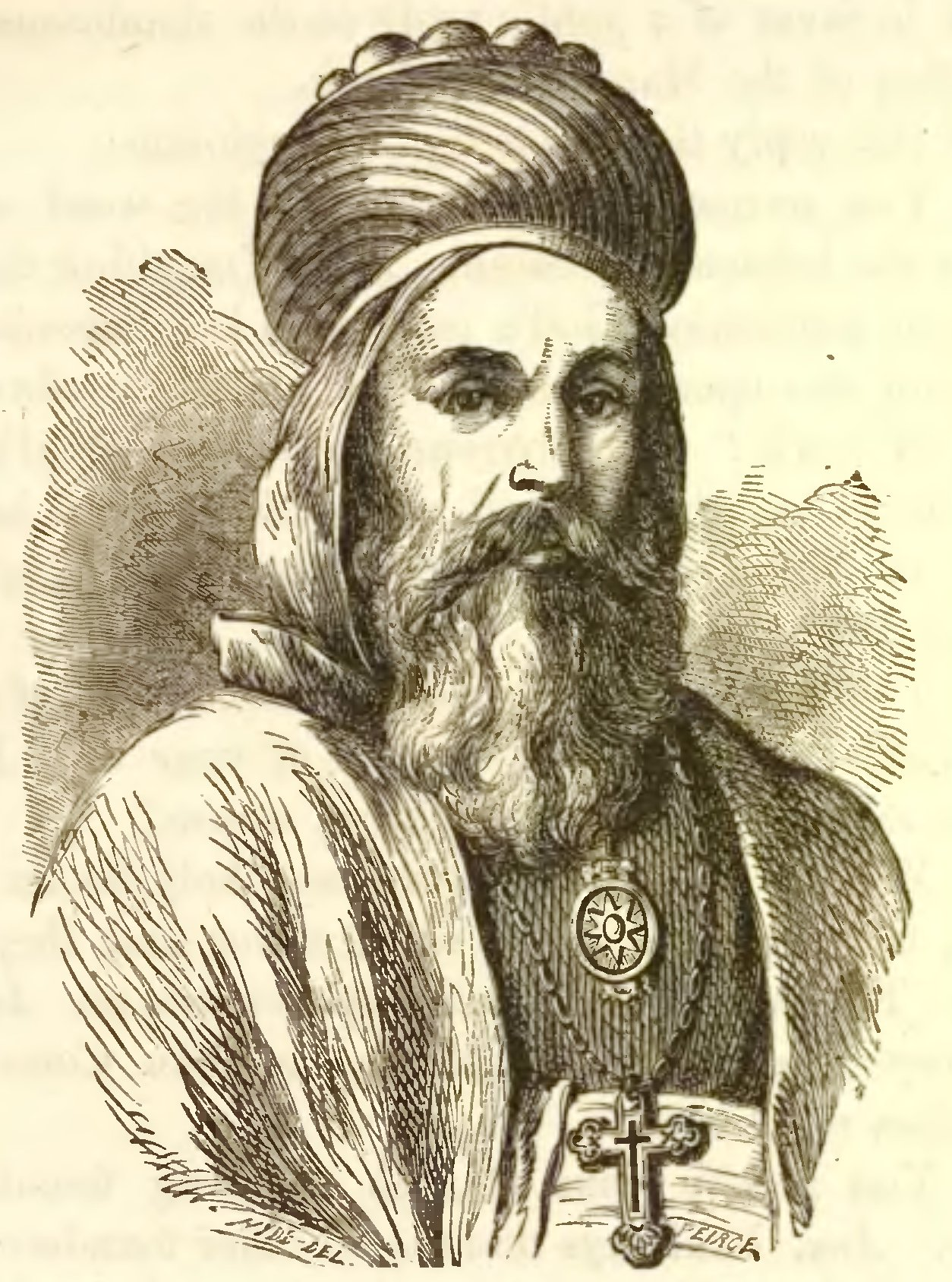
Youssef VIII Hobaish (1823–1845)

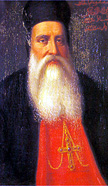
Youssef IX El Khazen (1845–1854)

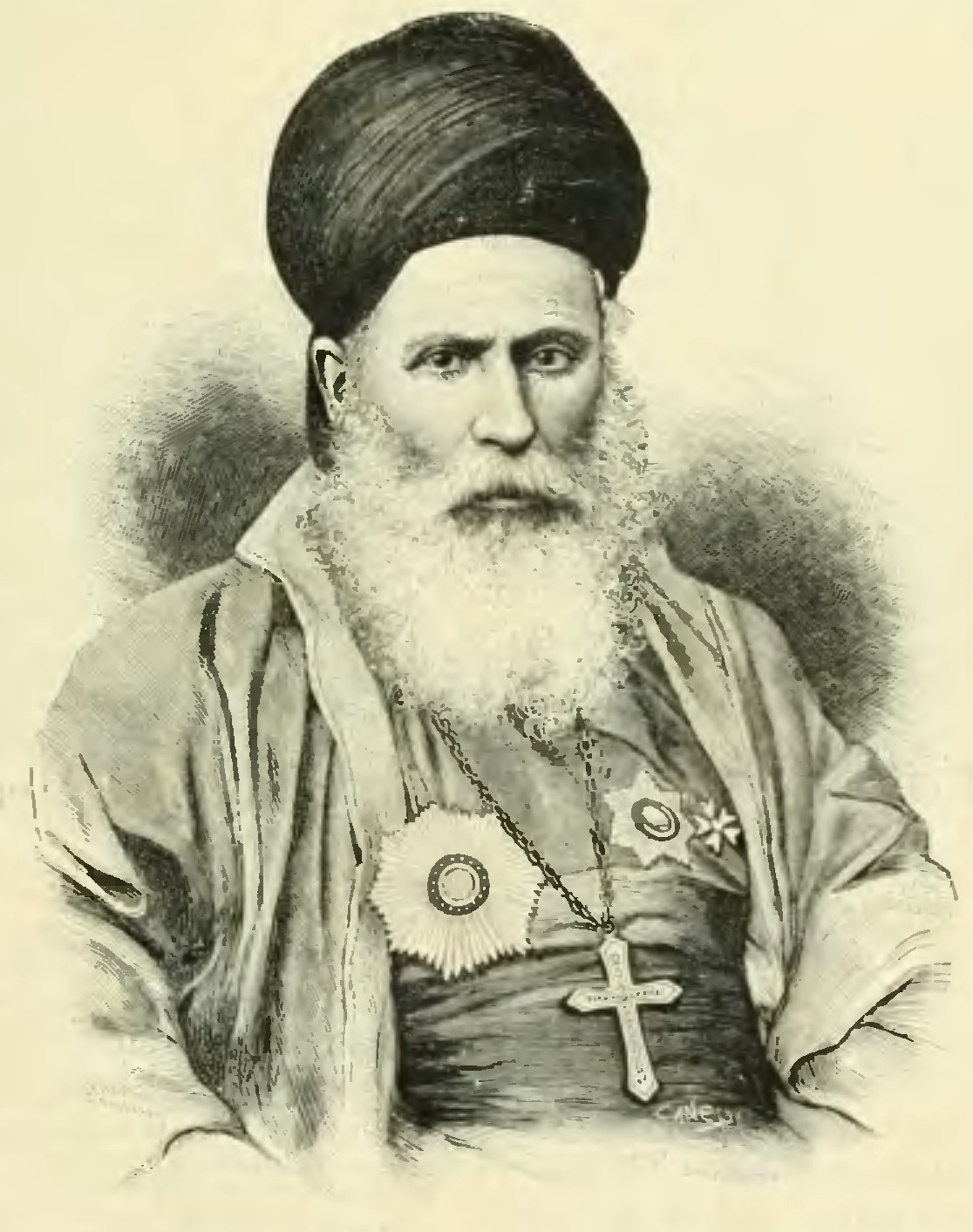
Boulos I Massad (1854–1890)

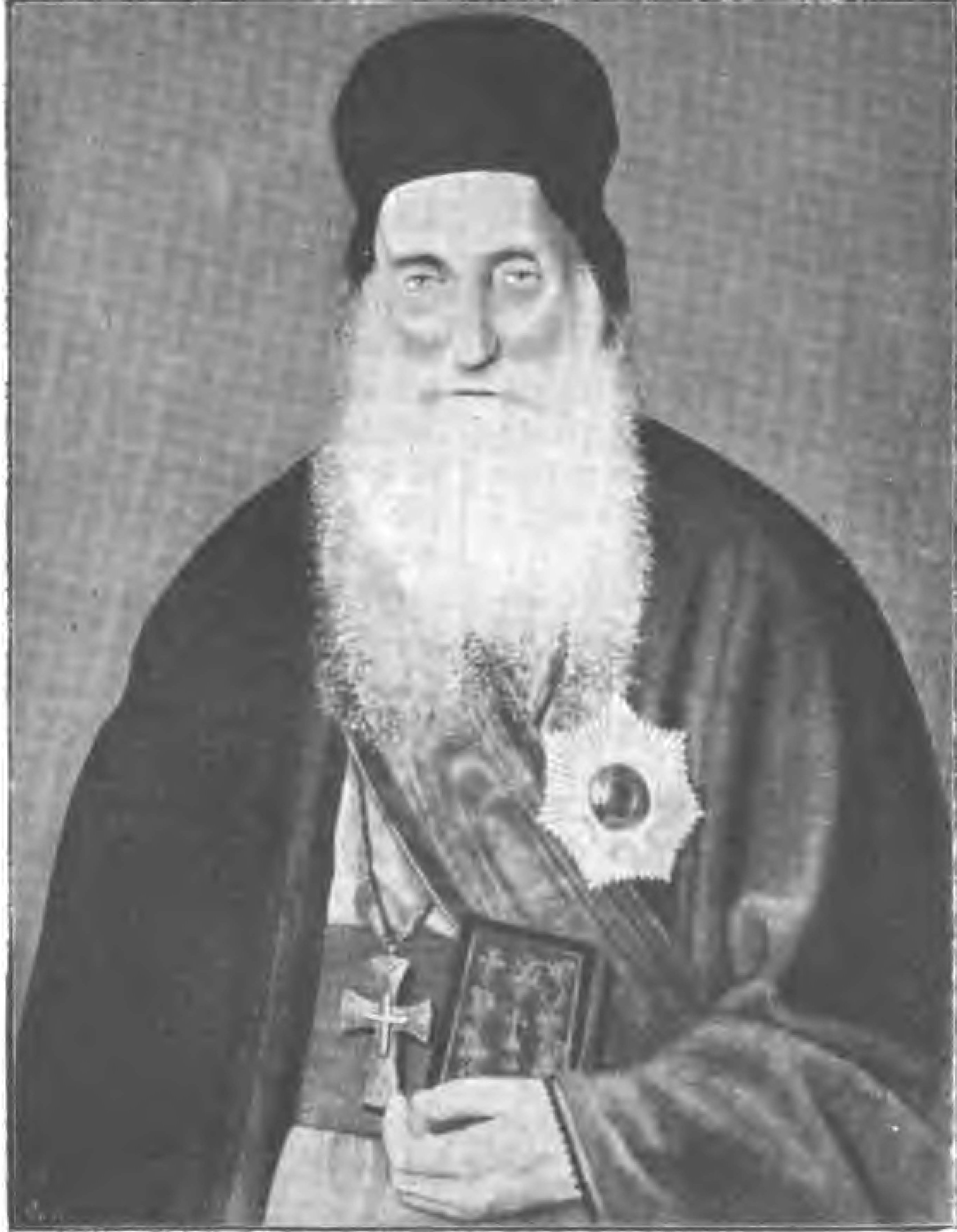
Youhanna XII El Hajj (1890–1898)

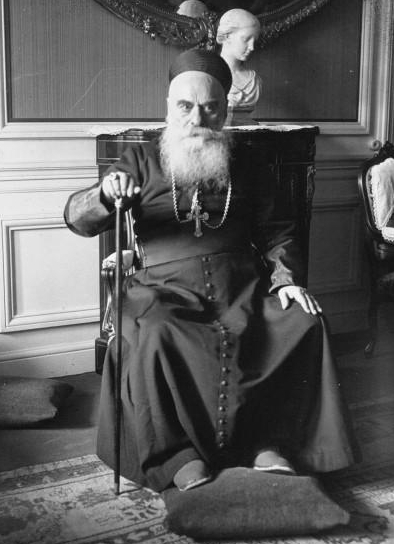
Elias Peter Hoayek (1898–1931)

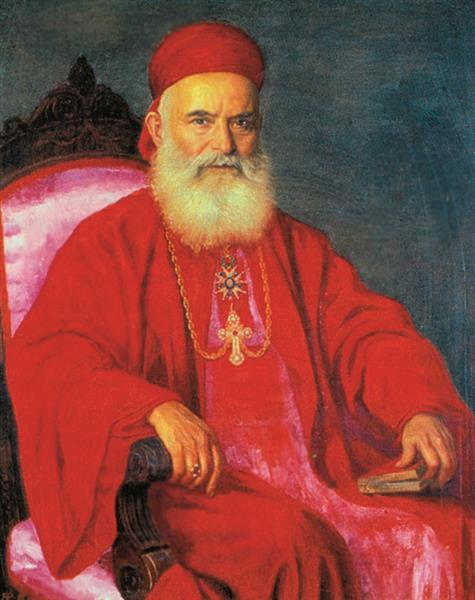
Anthony Peter Arida (1931–1955)

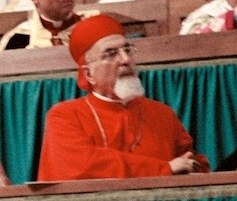
Paul IV Peter Meouchi (1955–1975)

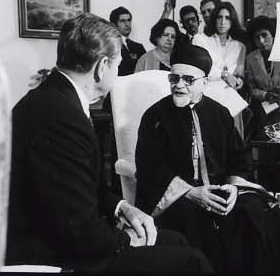
Anthony Peter Khoraish (1975–1986)

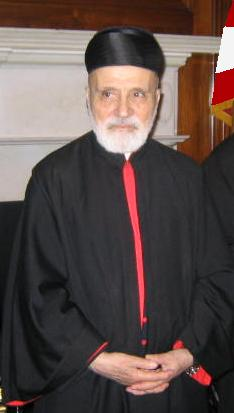
Nasrallah Boutros Sfeir (1986–2011)

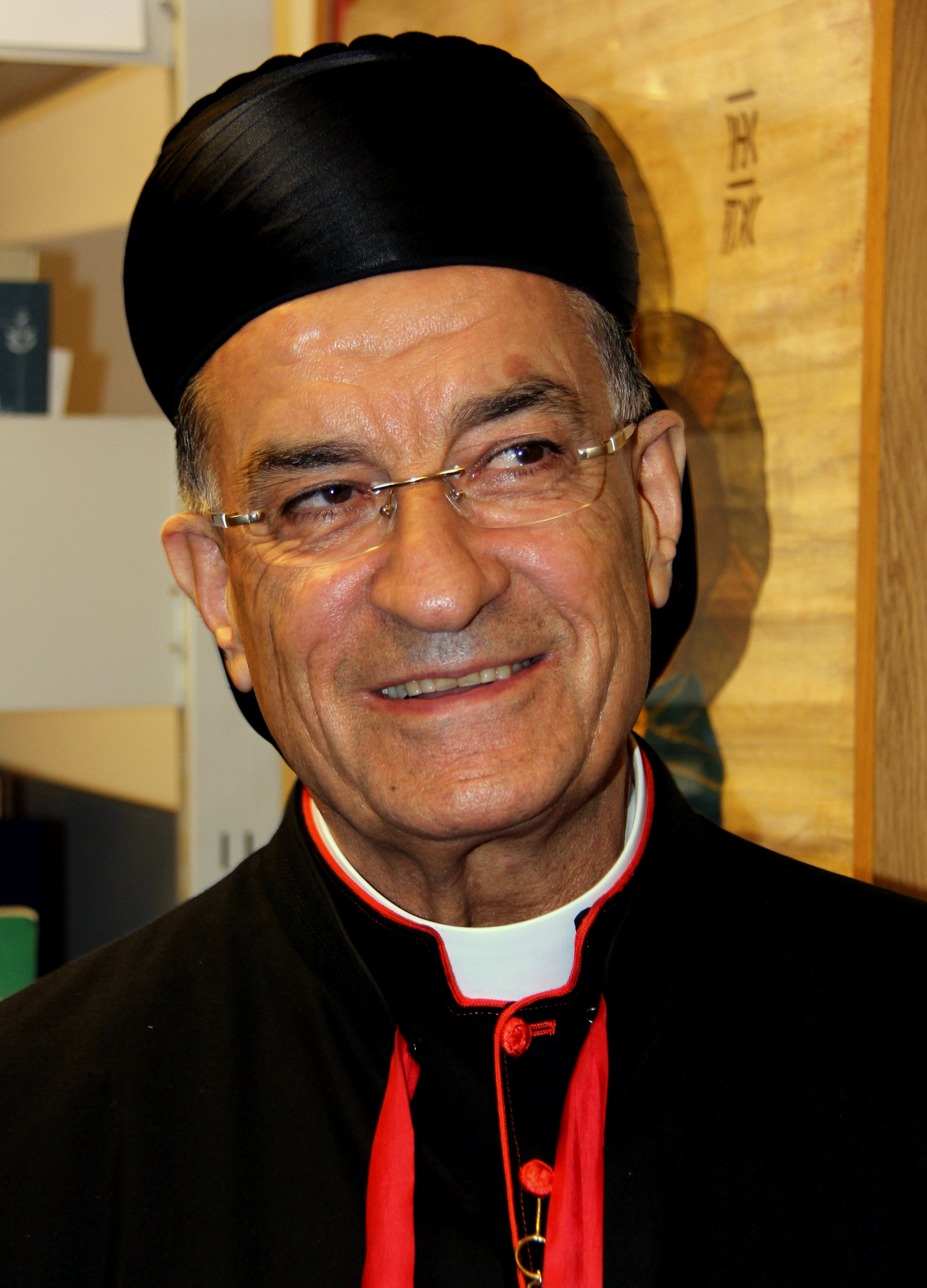
Bechara Boutros al-Rahi (2011–present)

== See also ==
- List of Latin Patriarchs of Antioch
- List of Melkite Greek Catholic Patriarchs of Antioch
- List of Orthodox Patriarchs of Antioch – 518 to present day
- List of Patriarchs of Antioch – beginning to 518
- Yusuf al-Asir
