= Joseph El Khazen =

Joseph El Khazen may refer to:

- Joseph Dergham El Khazen (died 1742), Maronite Patriarch, 1733–1742
- Joseph Ragi El Khazen (1791–1854), Maronite Patriarch, 1845–1854
