= Patriarch Joseph V =

Patriarch Joseph V may refer to:

- Joseph Dergham El Khazen, Maronite Patriarch of Antioch in 1733–1742
- Joseph V Augustine Hindi, Patriarch of the Chaldeans for the Chaldean Catholic Church in 1780–1827
