= Patriarch John XI =

Patriarch John XI may refer to:

- John XI Yeshu, Syriac Orthodox Patriarch of Antioch in 1208–1220
- John XI of Constantinople, Ecumenical Patriarch in 1275–1282
- Pope John XI of Alexandria, Pope of Alexandria & Patriarch of the See of St. Mark in 1427–1452
- John XI Helou, Maronite Patriarch of Antioch in 1809–1823
