= John XI =

John XI may refer to:

- Pope John XI, ruled in 931–935
- John XI Yeshu, Syriac Orthodox Patriarch of Antioch in 1208–1220
- John XI of Constantinople, Ecumenical Patriarch in 1275–1282
- Pope John XI of Alexandria, ruled in 1427–1452
- John XI Helou, Maronite Patriarch of Antioch in 1809–1823

== See also ==
- John 11, the eleventh chapter of the Gospel of John
