= Patriarch Joseph VII =

Patriarch Joseph VII may refer to:

- Joseph Tyan, Maronite Patriarch of Antioch in 1796–1809
- Yousef VII Ghanima, Patriarch of the Chaldean Catholic Church in 1947–1958
