= Patriarch Joseph VI =

Patriarch Joseph VI may refer to:

- Joseph Estephan, Maronite Patriarch of Antioch in 1766–1793
- Joseph VI Audo, Patriarch of the Chaldean Catholic Church in 1847–1878
