= Bernard Heyberger =

French historian (born 1954)

Bernard Heyberger (born 1954) is a French historian. He specializes in the history of Middle Eastern Christianity from the sixteenth century to the present; modern Catholicism and Catholic missions; and the Arab provinces of the late Ottoman Empire, especially Syria. He is a Director of Studies at the École des Hautes Études en Sciences Sociales (EHESS) in Paris, and simultaneously holds a chair as Director of Studies in the Religious Sciences section at the École Pratique des Hautes Études (EPHE), also in Paris. He is retired since 2020.

== Early life and family ==
Heyberger was born in Saint-Hippolyte, a village in the Haut-Rhin department in Alsace (northeastern France), to a family of small farmers and winemakers. His parents were Antoine Heyberger and Jeanne Bogner. Bernard Heyberger grew up speaking Alsatian Alemannisch, a Germanic language, as his native tongue. He is married to Colette Thommeret and has two sons.

== Education ==
After graduating from the lycée of Ribeauvillé in 1972, Bernard Heyberger studied history at the University of Strasbourg. He received the CAPES (Certificat d'Aptitude au Professorat de l'Enseignement du Second Degré) in History and Geography in 1979, and achieved the rank of agrégation in history in 1980. From 1979 to 1989, he taught in various secondary schools. He spent the 1989–1990 year in Damascus, studying Arabic with a grant from the Institut français d’études arabes. From 1990 to 1993, he was a research associate in the École Française de Rome. He completed his PhD dissertation, entitled, “Les Chrétiens du Proche-Orient au temps de la Réforme catholique”, under the supervision of the late Louis Châtellier in Nancy in 1993.

== Career and publications ==
Heyberger published his PhD dissertation as a book in 1994; a second edition appeared in 2014. Entitled Les Chrétiens du Proche-Orient au temps de la Réforme Catholique (Syrie, Liban, Palestine, XVIIe–XVIIIe siècle) (Christians of the Near East in the Era of Catholic Reform (Syria, Lebanon, Palestine, 17th–18th Centuries)), this book appeared from the press of the École Française de Rome. Focusing especially on the Syrian city of Aleppo, and drawing heavily upon records from the Propaganda Fide (the Roman Catholic church’s missionary agency), the book considers the historical anthropology of Middle Eastern Christian communities in a period when Jesuit and other Catholic missionaries were active among them. The book considers how Middle Eastern Christians’ material, social, and religious lives changed, and also how they interacted with Ottoman state authorities and with Muslim communities around them. Les Chrétiens du Proche-Orient au temps de la Réforme Catholique makes an important contribution to the study of confessionalization and sectarianism in the Ottoman Empire. It pays particular attention to the impact of Catholic missionaries on gender dynamics within Arab Christian societies, while pointing to what Heyberger has called the “feminization” of Middle Eastern Christianity through the assertion of female devotion.

Heyberger published a second book, entitled, Hindiyya (1720–1798): mystique et criminelle, in 2001. This book is a biographical study of the eighteenth-century Maronite Christian mystic and memoirist, Hindiyya ‘Ujaymi, who claimed to experience visitations from Christ. Trained by the Jesuits in Aleppo, Syria, where she grew up, Hindiyya founded a convent in Mount Lebanon but became mired in controversy following the deaths of two nuns, from torture, which occurred in her convent. Heyberger’s book appeared in English translation as Hindiyya, Mystic and Criminal (1720–1798): A Political and Religious Crisis in Lebanon, in 2013; an Arabic edition also appeared in 2010. To write this story of the woman who had an “iron will” for her times, Heyberger drew deeply upon archives in the Propaganda Fide in Rome – including records of inquisitions sent to investigate her – along with Maronite sources from the patriarchate in Bkiriki, Lebanon.

Heyberger also wrote two books responding to the major challenges that have faced Middle Eastern Christian communities in the post-9/11 era, especially in light of social upheavals caused by the U.S. invasion of Iraq in 2003, and, from 2011, the Syrian Civil War. These books are Les Chrétiens au Proche-Orient: De la compassion à la compréhension (2013); and Les Chrétiens d’Orient (2017). The latter considers the long and ambiguous impact of European – and especially French, British, and Russian – intervention in the region relative to Middle Eastern Christian communities. This book takes the story of Middle Eastern Christians into the early twenty-first century while commenting on the Islamist militant movement known as ISIS or Da’esh.

Heyberger has also edited or co-edited more than a dozen edited volumes on Christians and Muslims in the Ottoman world. He has appeared frequently as a media commentator in France and has given many public lectures.

With Paul Fahmé-Thiéry and Jérôme Lentin, Bernard Heyberger published in 2015 a French translation of the Arabic travelogue of Hanna Diyab of Aleppo, who visited Paris in 1708–1709. In Paris, Hanna Diyab met the French Orientalist, Antoine Galland, who was collecting the tales that he later published as the One Thousand and One Nights. Hanna Diyab told Galland some of stories in that collection which have since become most famous: he was the sole source of "Aladdin and the Lamp" and "Alibaba and the Forty Thieves". Heyberger wrote the introduction to this volume, in which he suggested that Hanna Diyab may have modeled the character of Aladdin on himself, or vice versa – an idea which, in the words of a reviewer, "will no doubt keep a generation of scholars very busy."

Heyberger has taught or supervised students at several institutions over the course of his career. These institutions include the Université de Haute-Alsace in Mulhouse, CNRS Strasbourg, Université François-Rabelais in Tours, and, in Paris, the École des Hautes Études en Sciences Sociales (EHESS), and the École Pratique des Hautes Études (EPHE). He held the distinction award of Senior Fellow of the Institut Universitaire de France (2005-2010), and served as Director of the Institut d’études de l’Islam et des Sociétés du Monde Musulman (IISMM) at EHESS from 2010 to 2014.

2023, his friends and followers Aurélien Girard, Cesare Santus, Vassa Kontouma and Karène Sanchez Summerer published Middle Eastern and European Christianity, 16th–20th Century, Edinburgh University Press (Edinburgh Studies in Middle Eastern Christianity), a collection of Heyberger's essays in English, with an introduction (pp. 10–46 : "An Introduction: A New History of Middle Eastern Christians" ) which is a biographical essay on Heyberger's life and academic achievements, with an assessment of Heyberger's work by Heather J. Sharkey, u. of Pennsylvania (pp. 1–9: "Foreword") and by John-Paul Ghobrial, U. of Oxford (pp. 264–270: "Epilogue"), and a complete bibliography of Heyberger (pp. 271–291).
