= George Omaira =

Head of the Maronite Church from 1634 to 1644

- Patriarch of Antioch
- Native name: جورج عميره
- Church: Maronite Church
- See: Patriarchate of Antioch
- In office: 26 December 1634 – July 1644
- Predecessor: Yuhanna Makhluf
- Successor: Youssef Habib Akouri
- Previous posts: Archeparchy of Ehden (1608-1634); Auxiliary Eparch of Antioch (1600-1608)

Orders
- Consecration: 1600 by Joseph el-Ruzzi

Personal details
- Born: c. 1570 Ehden, Emirate of Mount Lebanon, Ottoman Empire
- Died: July 1644

George Omaira (born in 1570?, Ehden, Lebanon - died in 1644) was the 53rd Patriarch of Antioch of the Maronite Church (1634-1644).

== Life ==
Georges Omaira was born in Ehden. He was sent to Rome in 1583 to study at the Pontifical Maronite College. He returned to Lebanon in 1595 under Pope Clement VIII.

In 1596, he published a Syriac and Chaldean grammar in Latin, one of the first in Europe, and also a translation of the New Testament into Syriac.

Omaira was consecrated auxiliary bishop in 1600 by Maronite Patriarch Youssef Rizzi el-Bkoufani. In 1608, became bishop of Ehden. Omaira returned to Europe when Patriarch Makhlouf sent him on a diplomatic mission to Rome and Tuscany to seek an alliance against the Ottoman government. He further encouraged Latin missionaries to come to Lebanon.

On 26 December 1634, with the death of Patriarch Makhlouf, he was elected Maronite Patriarch of Antioch. Omaira was the first student of the Maronite College to be chosen for this position, and the first patriarch to not be from a monastic order.

Patriarch Omaira died in July 1644.

== See also ==
- List of Maronite Patriarchs
- Maronite Church

== Bibliography ==
- Moosa, Matti (2005). The Maronites in History. New York: Gorgias Press. ISBN 1-59333-182-7.
