= Hindiyya al-'Ujaimi =

Maronite Nun (1720–1798)

Hindiyya (1720–1798; also Hindiyé or Hendiye, "the Indian"), born Hannah al-ʿUjaimi (other spellings: Anna ʿAdjaymi, ʿAjjeymi, or ʿAjami) was a Maronite mystic nun who claimed to have many visions of Jesus and Mary. She was a central figure in the history of the Maronite Church in the 18th century. Hindiyya founded in 1750 the controversial religious order of the Sacred Heart of Jesus, which was dissolved by order of pope Pius VI in 1779.

== Life ==
Hindiyya was born on August 6, 1720, in Aleppo to Shukrallah Ujaimi and mother Helene Hawwa, both devout Maronite Christians. Similar to other Maronite Christians of the time, the Ujaimis were merchants who were getting increasingly wealthy due to commercial treaties signed between European powers and the Ottomans' in 1675. Hindiyya had a brother named Nicholas and sisters, although the exact number of siblings is unclear.

Hindiyya studied under the Jesuits, which encouraged her in developing her spirituality and exposed her to the stories of other young women who had chosen a religious life over the secular path. Hindiyya in turn embraced many Roman Catholic devotions, as the frequent auricular Confession. The support from the Jesuits lasted until 1748.

She moved from Aleppo to Bkerke, Lebanon, where on March 25, 1750, she founded her own religious order called the Sacred Heart of Jesus, a Western devotion she imported among the Maronites and that made forthwith success. She claimed to have visions of Christ, to make miracles, to speak with Christ in mystical unions and to be united with the Trinity in a unique way. She soon became considered as a living saint and almost an object of veneration.

The majority of the Maronite clergy, as well as the Patriarchs Simon Awad, Tobias El Khazen, and Joseph Estephan firmly supported Hindiyya, while on the contrary the Jesuits, as well as some Maronites, became more and more mistrustful of her doctrine and personal cult. In 1752 Pope Benedict XIV ordered the first investigation of her practices. It was carried out by the Franciscan Desiderio da Casabasciana, who, initially hostile, became himself a supporter of Hindiyya.

The case of Hindiyya made a comeback under the patriarchate of Joseph Estephan, also because the Patriarch was so fond of the devotion imported by Hindiyya that he made the Sacred Heart a holy day of obligation for the Maronites. New inspections were carried out by Valeriano di Prato, Custodian of the Holy Land, in 1773 and finally by Pietro Craveri of Moretta, who took a stand against the doctrines of Hindiyya in 1775. The affair of Hindiyya combined with the opposition to Joseph Estephan by the Khazen Sheikhes and by the bishops Michael El Khazen and Michael Fadel. Finally in 1779 Pope Pius VI issued a decree stating that Hindiyya was delusional and her revelations and doctrines false. Moreover, the Pope abolished her Order of Sacred Heart and he suspended the Patriarch Joseph Estephan from all functions of office, appointing Michael El Khazen as Vicar.

Patriarch Joseph Estephan was restored to power only in 1784, while Hindiyya lived the rest of her life confined to various convents and her works were proscribed. She died on February 13, 1798, in the convent of Our Lady of the Fields.

== Personality ==
Hindiyya was different from young women her age and was often ridiculed for her decision to abstain from acts she deemed “materialistic” but were considered social norms. She believed she was created to dedicate her life to Christ and spoke to religious figures of visions she had of Christ in which he instructed her to establish a confraternity: “at the age of four or five I would feel in the heart a clear voice telling me that I will establish a confraternity of men and women and that I will be its president, that is its founder…”. As a young woman Hindiyya was sought out by young men and women who admired her devotion, this turned into ridicule once she became of marriageable age and refused to marry. Her decision to remain single and devote her life to Christ was an explicit rejection of social boundaries adhered to by young women her age and displayed how dedicated she was to her goals.

=== Role of Women ===
The measures she took in an effort to worship Christ and strengthen her relationship were often ridiculed by her mother, siblings, and neighbors who felt she was depriving herself. Her behavior was antisocial and viewed as extreme; she refrained from speaking to her father on a particular instance claiming, “Our Lord Jesus Christ said that whosoever does not leave his father and mother…will not deserve my love.” Her decision to avoid socializing and participating in social rituals expected of young women her age was seen as rebellious and she was the victim of tremendous ridicule. Determined to act on the visions she had as a young girl, she sought to establish a confraternity and was determined to surpass the gender roles assigned to women by religious figures.

=== Doctrine ===
During the inspections to her Congregation held in the 1770s, Hindiyya was charged with many heterodox doctrines in comparison with the Maronite historical doctrine, for example her claims that she was united with Christ in a hypostatic, real and not accidental union, that her knowledge was more perfect than that of the angels, that it was by her that Jesus would judge souls in death, that she was infallible, that many verses of the Bible referred to her, that she was greater than Mary, and that because of her union with Christ she was to be worshipped. Hindiyya was also charged with many illicit liturgical behaviors, such as taking the Communion whenever she wanted, refusing to fast, claiming spiritual jurisdiction, and even administering confession.

== Influence ==
Hindiyya's figure and spirituality had a significant influence on a similar Aleppo-based sect, the Worshippers of the Sacred Heart, which was founded a few years later by Margaret Baptist and supported by the French priest, Nicholas Gaudez. This sect was opposed by the Melkite Patriarch Maximos III Mazloum, was censored by Propaganda Fide in 1838, and suppressed in 1849.

Bernard Heyberger, author of a major biographical study of Hindiyya and her place in Maronite history, argued that her career exemplified the "feminization" of Middle Eastern Christianity under the influence of Catholic missionaries, who encouraged new cultures of female devotion.

== Sources ==
- Frazee, Charles A. (2006) [1983]. Catholics and Sultans: The Church and the Ottoman Empire 1453-1923. Cambridge: Cambridge University Press. ISBN 978-0-521-02700-7.
