= Michael Fadel =

Head of the Maronite Church from 1793 to 1795

His Beatitude Michael II Fadel (ميخائيل الثاني فاضل)
- Patriarch of Antioch
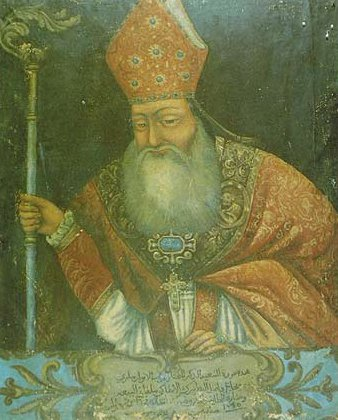
- Church: Maronite Church
- See: Patriarch of Antioch
- Elected: September 10, 1793
- Term ended: May 17, 1795
- Predecessor: Joseph Estephan
- Successor: Philip Gemayel

Orders
- Consecration: 1762 (Bishop) by Tobias El Khazen

Personal details
- Born: 1710 Beirut, Lebanon
- Died: May 17, 1795 (aged 84–85) Dayr Harrash, Lebanon

Michael II Fadel (1710 in Beirut, Lebanon – May 17, 1795, in Dayr Harrash, Lebanon) (or Mikhail Fadil, Arabic: ميخائيل الثاني فاضل) was the 64th Patriarch of Antioch from 1793 to his death in 1795.

== Life ==
Michael Fadel was born in Beirut, Lebanon in 1710. Ordained priest at 21 years, from 1741 to 1753 he served the community of Acre where he erected a church. In 1754 he converted to Christianity the first member of the governing Shihab family. In 1762 Michael Fadel was appointed and consecrated bishop of Tyre and Patriarchal Vicar by Patriarch Tobias El Khazen, who later appointed him also bishop of Beirut in place of Joseph Estephan.

After 1766, under the patriarchate of Joseph Estephan, Michael Fadel sided with the opponents to the Patriarch led by the Khazen Sheikhes, and he was one of supporters of the suspension of the Patriarch from 1779 to 1784, due to the Hindiyé's issue. Patriarch Estephan, in turn, appointed in 1768 Athanase Scenai and later in 1779 Joseph Najm (or Nujaym) in his place as bishop of Beirut. The solution of the dispute about the see of Beirut occurred only in the synod of 1786 where an agreement was found and Michael Fadel was confirmed as bishop of Beirut.

Patriarch Joseph Estephan died on April 22, 1793, reconciled with Rome, but because of a pestilence the bishops could meet only in September. On September 10, 1793 Michael Fadel was elected patriarch and choose to reside in the monastery of Dayr Harrash (in Keserwan District). Fadel send to Rome the priest George Ghanem, to obtain confirmation of the pope of his election. However, when Ghanem arrived in Rome, Fadel had already died on May 17, 1795, at Dayr Harrash, where he was buried, before the Vatican could confirm him.

However in the consistory of 27 June 1796, which confirmed the election of his successor Philip Gemayel, Pope Pius VI mentioned the name of Fadel on the list of the Maronite Patriarchs.

== See also ==
- Maronite Church
- Joseph Estephan
- List of Maronite Patriarchs
