= Joseph el-Ruzzi =

Head of the Maronite Church from 1597 to 1608

Emirate of Mount Lebanon
- Patriarch of Antioch
- Church: Maronite Church
- See: Patriarchate of Antioch
- In office: 16 October 1596 – March 1608
- Predecessor: Sarkis Rizzi el-Bkoufani
- Successor: Yuhanna Makhluf

Orders
- Consecration: 25 December 1595 by Sarkis Rizzi el-Bkoufani

Personal details
- Born: Bkoufa (near Ehden), Emirate of Mount Lebanon, Ottoman Empire
- Died: March 1608

Joseph el-Ruzzi, in Arabic Yusuf al-Ruzzi, was the Patriarch of the Maronite Church in 1597–1608. He promulgated several measures bringing the Maronite Church in concert with Rome. Among the changes was the Church's switch from the Julian calendar to the Gregorian calendar, making the Maronites the first Eastern Church to make the move.

== Origins ==
Ruzzi was from Bkoufa near Ehden in northern Mount Lebanon. He belonged to the Ruzzi family. His uncle Mikha'il served as patriarch of the Maronite Church from 1567 until his death in 1597.

== Patriarchate ==
Ruzzi succeeded his uncle as patriarch after being elected in 1597. His election occurred during the visit of the papal emissary Girolamo Dandini who was sent to keep tabs on the Maronite Church's implementation of Roman Catholic reforms after reports that Mikha'il had Jacobite tendencies. According to the historian William Harris, Ruzzi ardently pursued papal practices, and the historian Pierre Dib considers him "a daring and resourceful man ... an inconsiderate Latinizer". In a council he held in the village of Moussa in 1598, he set out measures toward the Latinization of the Maronite Church. The following year Pope Clement VIII instructed Ruzzi to promulgate Latin marital rules in the Maronite Church; the marital rules relating to consanguinity, affinity, public honesty and spiritual relationship, did not take into effect until the late 19th century. Among the Latinization measures he implemented, Ruzzi revised fasting periods in accordance with Rome and removed a degree of Syriac from Maronite liturgy and ritual.

Despite opposition from a significant proportion of the Maronites, he implemented the church's switch to the Gregorian calendar in 1606. The change was implemented successfully in Syria, but the Cypriot Maronites continued using the Julian calendar. Ruzzi's act made the Maronites the first Eastern Church to adopt the Gregorian calendar; the Syriacs and Chaldeans followed in 1836, the Melkites in 1857 and the Armenians in 1911. Not long after Ruzzi's act, in the 1600s, the Maronites discontinued counting the years from the Seleucid era in favor of the Christian era.

Ruzzi died in March 1608. According to Dib, the measures implemented by Ruzzi were "harsh vexations" for the Maronites which prevented the election of a new patriarch until 16 October. Ruzzi's successor John Makhlouf criticized Ruzzi's reforms and expressed to Pope Paul V his desire to reestablish the ancient practices of the Maronite Church which were changed by Ruzzi to placate his religious subjects. Despite initial opposition, Ruzzi's changes became a permanent aspect of the Church.

Ruzzi was influential with the Ottoman governor of Tripoli and Sunni Muslim local chieftain Yusuf Sayfa Pasha (intermittent r. 1579–1625), whose jurisdiction spanned the predominantly Maronite districts of Byblos, Bsharri and Batroun in northern Mount Lebanon. The Patriarch frequently obtained orders of safe conduct from the Governor, who strove to win the support of his distrusting Maronite peasant subjects.

== Bibliography ==
- Abu-Husayn, Abdul-Rahim (1985). Provincial Leaderships in Syria, 1575–1650. Beirut: American University of Beirut. ISBN 9780815660729.
- Dib, Pierre (1971). History of the Maronite Church. Detroit: Maronite Apostolic Exarchate.
- Harris, William (2012). Lebanon: A History, 600–2011. New York: Oxford University Press. ISBN 978-0-19-518-111-1.
- Salibi, Kamal S. (February 1973). "The Sayfās and the Eyalet of Tripoli 1579–1640". Arabica. 20 (1): 25–52. doi:10.1163/15700585-02001004. JSTOR 4056003. S2CID 247635304.
