= John Helou =

Head of the Maronite Church from 1809 to 1823

John XI Helou (يوحنا الحادي عشر الحلو)
- Patriarch of Antioch
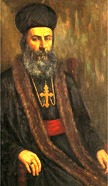
- Church: Maronite Church
- See: Patriarch of Antioch
- Elected: June 8, 1809
- Term ended: May 12, 1823
- Predecessor: Joseph Tyan
- Successor: Joseph Peter Hobaish

Orders
- Consecration: 1786 (Bishop) by Joseph Estephan

Personal details
- Born: Ghosta, Lebanon
- Died: May 12, 1823 Qannubin, Lebanon

John XI Helou (or Youhanna Helou, Al-Hilu; Arabic: يوحنا الحادي عشر الحلو, French: Jean el-Hélou, Latin: Iohannes Dolce; died May 12, 1823) was the 67th Maronite Patriarch of Antioch from 1809 until his death in 1823.

== Life ==
John Helou was born in the village of Ghosta, in the Keserwan District, Lebanon. He was known in Europe as John Dolce, because Dolce is the Latin translation of his surname. John Helou was consecrated titular bishop of Acre on August 6, 1786, by Patriarch Joseph Estephan, and he remained near the Patriarch as auxiliary bishop.

Patriarch Joseph Tyan communicated his resignation to the Maronite bishops on September 24, 1808, which was accepted by the Holy See on November 19 of the same year, and consequently Aloisio Gandolfi, who was appointed Apostolic visitor in the Maronite Patriarchate since 1807, summoned a meeting of all the bishops in Harissa. A short time later, on June 8, 1809, John Helou was elected Patriarch. The formal approval of Pope Pius VII didn't arrive until 19 December 1814, because Pope Pius VII was actually kept in confinement from 1809 till May 1814 by Napoleon.

After the turbulent years in which the previous Patriarch Joseph Tyan supported Napoleon in the Siege of Acre (1799) and came in conflict with the emir Bashir II, Patriarch John Helou chose a low and neutral course of action, and from 1811 he retreated in the Qannubin Monastery, the ancient and abandoned patriarchal residence, located in the deep gorge of Kadisha Valley, which he restored.

John Helou converted the former monasteries of Saint Maron of Kfarhaye (Batroun District) and of Saint Maron of Roumieh into seminaries and colleges.

As demanded by Pope Pius VII with the brief of November 18, 1816, Patriarch John Helou tried to implement two of the more controversial decrees of the Lebanese Council of 1736: the separation of monasteries where both men and women lived, and the definition of a fixed episcopal residence into each Maronite diocese. Pius VII then commanded the patriarch to convene a synod, to resolve these outstanding issues. With this intent he summoned a synod in the church of Our Lady of Louiaze in Zouk Mosbeh, near Harissa, which was held on April 13 and 14, 1818. The acts of the synod were subjected to Propaganda Fide for its approval. This synod made some changes with the decree Cum for litteras of 15 March 1819; the document was finally approved by Pius VII with the papal brief Quod de constants of May 25, 1819, but they were implemented only by Helou's successor, Patriarch Joseph Peter Hobaish. John Helou died on May 12, 1823, in the Monastery of Qannubin.

== See also ==
- List of Maronite Patriarchs
- Maronite Church

== Sources ==
- Pierre Dib, v. Maronite (Eglise), in Dictionnaire de Théologie Catholique, Tome Dixième, première partie, Paris 1928, coll. 101-103.
- K. Rizk, Helou Jean El-, in Dictionnaire d'histoire et de géographie ecclésiastiques, 23 (1990), pp. 958–959.
