= Joseph Estephan =

Head of the Maronite Church from 1766 to 1793

Joseph VI Estephan (يوسف السادس اسطفان)
- Patriarch of Antioch
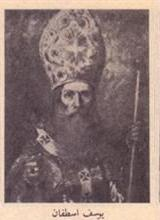
- Church: Maronite Church
- See: Patriarch of Antioch
- Elected: June 9, 1766
- Term ended: April 22, 1793
- Predecessor: Tobias El Khazen
- Successor: Michael Fadel

Orders
- Consecration: August 1754 (Bishop) by Simon Awad

Personal details
- Born: 1729 Ghosta, Lebanon
- Died: April 22, 1793 (aged 63–64) Ghosta, Lebanon

Joseph VI Estephan (or Yusuf Istifan, Stephan, Arabic: يوسف السادس اسطفان; 1729, Ghosta, Lebanon – 22 April 1793, Ghosta, Lebanon) was the 63rd Maronite Catholic Patriarch of Antioch from 1766 until his death in 1793.

== Life ==
Joseph Estephan was born in the village of Ghosta, in the Keserwan District, Lebanon in 1729. He studied in Rome in the College of the Propaganda where he remained from 1739 to 1751. Returning to Lebanon on May 21, 1752 he was ordained as a priest by his uncle, bishop John Estephan, and in August 1754 he was consecrated bishop of Beirut by Patriarch Simon Awad.

His uncle, John Estephan, participated in the Lebanese Council of 1736 and in 1742 became bishop of Beirut. In 1754 John Estephan retired in order to let his nephew, Joseph, be appointed bishop of the same town. Joseph Estephan became bishop in 1754 and remained bishop of Beirut till 1762, when he quarreled with Patriarch Tobias El Khazen, because he refused to support the uncanonical arrangement of dioceses decided by Tobias, and also because he was accused of being ordained bishop at 23 years, not 25 years as Joseph Estephan always claimed.

After Tobias' death, Joseph Estephan was elected patriarch on June 9, 1766, and confirmed by Pope Clement XIII on April 6, 1767.

The new patriarch placed his residence in the monastery of St. Joseph al-Hosn of Ghosta. Among his first acts, there was a celebration of a synod of the Maronite Church, in order to apply the reform of the discipline of the church established by the Maronite Synod of 1736. He shared his plans with the pope, who replied on August 2, 1767 by approving his initiative. Estephan prepared the synod which was held between 16 and 21 September 1768 in the presence of the Apostolic Delegate, the Franciscan Luigi from Bastia, Custody of the Holy Land and was concerning to the distribution of tithes, an issue on which he collided with many bishops who complained against Propaganda Fide. Propaganda Fide approved the acts of the synod, but with some modifications.

At the same time Estephan appointed a patriarchal vicar in the person of Michel El Khazen as Vicar.

In addition to better defend the interests of the Maronite nation, Estephan appointed an official representative at the court of the king of France; and he demanded and obtained an appointment of a notable Maronite by French king, Louis XVI, Sheikh Sa'd El Ghandour Khoury, consul in Beirut.

These initiatives of the Youssef Estephan and his desire to reform church discipline rose up against him a vigorous opposition, particularly among the Jesuits, bishops and monks, who began against him a smear campaign and discredit. In 1771 seven Maronite bishops and some family members El Khazen wrote to the pope complaining about the attitudes of the patriarch. In particular the patriarch was criticized for entertaining suspicious relationships with religious, mystical and visionaries as Hindiyya al-'Ujaimi, a nun founder of the Sacred Heart Congregation: devotee of the Sacred Heart, Estephan, like its predecessor, the congregation approved of Hindiyya. But slander against religious ended up falling back also on the patriarch. Jesuits, bishops and monks became more and more mistrustful of her doctrine and personal cult, and finally obtained from Rome an inspection entrusted to the Franciscan Valeriano of Prato in 1773, which followed another in 1775, entrusted to the Franciscan Pietro Craveri of Moretta (1726–1801). Following the advice of two papal legates, on July 17, 1779 Pope Pius VI issued a decree stating that Hindiyya was deluded and her revelations and doctrines false. Also he decreed the suppression of the Congregation of the Sacred Heart; and Hindiyya al-'Ujaimi, accused of imaginary visions, was forced to retire to a convent retracting all his alleged revelations. Moreover, the Pope suspended Joseph Estephan from all functions (apart from episcopal appointments and consecrations) and ordering him to go to Rome to explain his attitudes.

Joseph Estephan, hearing the news, tried to travel to Rome, but his health forced him to stop at Carmelite convent of Mount Carmel. In the meantime Michel Khazen summoned a synod, on July 21, 1780 in which he did not even invite Estephan and in the presence of the apostolic delegate Moretta, celebrated a synod to restore peace in the Maronite country. This situation lasted till the young secretary of Pietro Craveri of Moretta, Joseph Tyan, took it upon himself to travel to Rome, against the will of Craveri, to plead Estephan's case. On September 28, 1784 Propaganda Fide restored Joseph Estephan in all his functions.

Restored as Patriarch, Joseph Estephan summoned other two synods, the first on September 6–11, 1786 at 'Ain-Caqiq, which was not approved by Rome, and the second, approved, at Bkerke from December 3–18, 1790 under the presidency of Germanos Adam. On January 14, 1789 Joseph Estephan converted the convent of 'Ain-Warqa into a seminary. He died on April 22, 1793, in the monastery of Ghosta, where he was buried.

== See also ==
- List of Maronite Patriarchs
- Maronite Church
