= Jacob Awad =

Head of the Maronite Church from 1705 to 1733

Jacob IV Awad (يعقوب الرابع عوّاد)
- Patriarch of Antioch
- Church: Maronite Church
- See: Patriarch of Antioch
- Elected: November 6, 1705
- Term ended: February 12, 1733
- Predecessor: Gabriel of Blaouza
- Successor: Joseph Dergham El Khazen

Orders
- Consecration: 1698 (Bishop) by Estephan El Douaihy

Personal details
- Born: Hasroun, Lebanon
- Died: February 12, 1733

Jacob IV Aouad (or Ya'qub Awwad, Auwad, Aouad, Arabic: يعقوب الرابع عوّاد, Latin: Iacobus Evodius Hasruensis born in Hasroun, Lebanon - died on 12 February 1733) was a former Eparch of the Maronite Catholic Archeparchy of Tripoli and the 59th Maronite Patriarch of Antioch from 1705 to his death in 1733. In Latin he is called Iacobus Petrus Evodius Hasruensis.

== Life ==
Jacob Awad was born in Hasroun, Lebanon. He studied in Rome for thirteen years, and at his return in Lebanon he served as secretary of Patriarch Estephan El Douaihy, who consecrated him bishop of Tripoli in 1698. Jacob Awad was elected patriarch on November 6, 1705 by the bishops met in the patriarchal residence of the Qannubin Monastery in Kadisha Valley. His election was confirmed by Pope Clement XI on February 21, 1706 by Papal bull Romans pontificis and Clement XI with the papal brief Cum nos nuper, granted him the pallium on February 8, 1708.

The election of Jacob Awad as patriarch was opposed by a number of bishops, who in the next years built a fierce opposition to him, spreading rumors about inadmissible behavior of the Patriarch in his residence of the Qannubin Monastery. These rumors turned into a large scandal, and finally the bishops, advised by some Latin missionaries, in particular by the Carmelite Elias Giacinto, sent for Jacob Awad and summoned a brief trial in the church of Saint Serge and Bacchus in Rayfoun. Here, in May 1710, Jacob Awad was declared guilty and deposed. In his place the bishop of Saida, Youssef Moubarak Al Rayfouni, was elected patriarch, and Awad was confined in the monastery of Our Lady of Louiaze. However, to fully enforce the decisions taken, it was necessary to obtain the approval of Pope; with this aim the opponents of Awad sent Georges Benjamin bishop of Ehden to Rome. On December 16, 1710 in Rome, contrary to Benjamin's hopes, the Congregation for the Propagation of the Faith ruled in favor of Awad.

The Holy See, surprised with the serious accusations made against the patriarch and unprecedented procedure used by the synod of the Maronite Church ordered that the Custodian of the Holy Land Fra Laurent de Saint-Laurent was sent to Rayfoun, where Youssef Moubarak lived, to restore Awad to the patriarchal see. On August 13, 1711 Jacob Awad was formally reinstated as Patriarch, but during the ceremony he presented his resignation, probably a way to conciliate the decree of Rome with his opponents' will. Youssef Moubarak was so elected Patriarch for the second time. With this maneuver, he tried to hide the forced deposition of the patriarch with a spontaneous discharge, and all with the approval of the Apostolic Delegate. However Jacob Awad had an unexpected support in the French consul in Lebanon, Poullard, that he transferred the patriarch resigned to Sidon under the protection of the French consulate; and from a young Maronite priest stationed in Rome, Giuseppe Simone Assemani. The resignation was examined in Rome by the Congregation for the Propagation of the Faith on February 15, 1712, and they decided to start a trial which lasted till May 8, 1713. The final verdict was to reject Awad's resignation, to reinstall him as Patriarch and to condemn the Carmelite Elias Giacinto who was considered the origin of the false rumors. These decisions were confirmed by Pope Clement XI with papal brief Nationem vestram of 30 June 1713 and easily implemented in Lebanon also because the work of Poullard, who had personally enthrone Awad in the patriarchal residence of Qannubin and the death, on September 8, 1713, of the anti-patriarch Youssef Moubarak; thus in January 1714, Jacob Awad returned to the patriarchal residence in the Qannubin Monastery. The submission and loyalty to the Maronite Church of Rome won him praise directed by Clement XI to entire Maronite nation on 18 August 1714.

Jacob Awad during his patriarchate helped many Catholic Melkites during the persecutions by the Orthodox party after the schism of 1724. After a long pontificate, Yaaqoub Awwad died in the monastery of Mar Challita in Kisrawan on February 12, 1733.

== See also ==
- List of Maronite Patriarchs
- Maronite Church

== Sources ==
- Pierre Dib, v. Maronite (Eglise), https://archive.org/stream/dictionnairedet10pt1vaca#page/n43/mode/2up, Tome Dixième, première partie, Paris 1928, coll. 73–79.
- Giuseppe Simone Assemani, https://archive.org/stream/serieschronologi00asseuoft#page/40/mode/2up, Rome 1881, p. 40.
- Konrad Eubel, Hierarchia Catholica Medii Aevi, https://archive.org/stream/hierarchiacathol05eubeuoft#page/89/mode/1up, vol. 5, p. 89.
- Rouhana, Paul (24 November 2010). "Histoire du Synode libanais de 1736 : du patriarcat de Jacques Aouad 1705 - 1733 jusqu'à la célébration solennelle du Synode 30 sept. - 2 oct. 1736". Parole de l'Orient. hdl:2042/35154.
