= Jeremias II al-Amshitti =

Head of the Maronite Church from 1199 to 1230

Jeremiah II al-Amshitti (Arabic: ارميا العمشيتي; died 1230), born Abdallah Khairallah Obeid (عبدالله خيرالله عبيد), was the 32nd Maronite Patriarch of Antioch from 1199. He was known for the miracle of the levitation of the host during a Mass he celebrated in Rome on the occasion of his participation in the Fourth Council of the Lateran.

He was born in Amsheet, a village near Byblos, the ancient Phoenician city. Very pious since his young age, he lived in a hermitage in his village, in a cell near the Saint-Zakhia church (then known as "the Holy Zakhia churches" because they were three small churches, very old, dating to the fifth century). His brothers helped in the development of these hermitages. After a period in the hermitage in his hometown, he went to another hermitage, Mayfouk, to the convent of Our Lady Of Ilige. The Maronite tradition has a custom of choosing patriarchs from among hermits.

He was elected patriarch of the Maronite Church, following the death of Patriarch Peter IV (بطرس الرابع). Amshitti chose for the first patriarchal seat, Yanouh (يانوح). Known for his devotion, he was invited to Rome by Pope Innocent III to participate in the IV Council of the Lateran. The Patriarch Jeremiah Amshitti was working to consolidate the Maronite faith in union with the Catholic Church. He spent five years in Rome, from the Pope he received the pallium, a sign of unity with Rome, and he participated in the Fourth Council of the Lateran on 11 November 1215. Al-Amshitti was Maronite Patriarch until 1230, when he died at Mayfouk.

During his stay in Rome and during a celebration of the Eucharist in the presence of Pope Innocent III, at St. Peter's Basilica, a light came out of the host and the host remained elevated after the patriarch had dropped his hands. Estephan El Douaihy, great historian and Maronite Patriarch, writes about this event in his history of the Maronite patriarchs (سلسلة البطاركة الموارنة) and says that the Pope ordered that this scene be represented on the walls of St. Peter's Basilica.

== Bibliography ==
- Lahoud, Adib; Al Dawha al Amchitiya, 1954, Dar El Tibaa wal Nasher, Rue des Cèdres, Saifi, Beyrouth.
