= Yuhanna Makhluf =

Head of the Maronite Church from 1608 to 1633

- Patriarch of Antioch
- Church: Maronite Church
- See: Patriarchate of Antioch
- In office: 16 November 1608 – 1633
- Predecessor: Joseph el-Ruzzi
- Successor: George Omaira
- Previous post: Eparch of Ehden (1603-1608)

Orders
- Consecration: 1603 by Joseph el-Ruzzi

Personal details
- Died: 1633

Yuhanna Makhlouf, or John Makhlouf, was the Maronite Patriarch in 1608–1633.

== Life ==
Makhlouf was a graduate of the Maronite college in Rome. That college had been founded in 1585 by Pope Gregory XIII to train Maronite clergy.

Makhlouf was elected patriarch on 16 October 1608 or June 1609, succeeding Joseph el-Ruzzi, who had died in March 1608. The delay was due to the instability in the Church's home region of Bsharri in northern Mount Lebanon. The Ottoman government had mandated the quartering of imperial troops in the Tripoli Eyalet, a practice detested by the inhabitants, for the year 1607. The mandate was enforced by the Maronite muqaddams (rural chiefs) of Bsharri on behalf of the provincial governor Yusuf Sayfa. The unfavorable or chaotic circumstances of the forced quartering was blamed for the delay in the election.

The historian Pierre Dib describes Makhlouf as "a man of good and stable sense, of a character which was both gentle and firm at the same time, of a deep and active piety". He was the first graduate of the Rome college to be elected patriarch and many other graduates followed him, including the prominent Istifan al-Duwayhi.

Makhlouf was not on good terms with Yusuf al-Khatir, the muqaddam of Bsharri, due to the troops quartering and other unspecified actions by Yusuf against Makhlouf. As a result, soon after his election, he left the patriarchal seat at Qannubin in Bsharri and took refuge in the Chouf area of southern Mount Lebanon with the powerful Druze emir and governor of the Sidon-Beirut district, Fakhr al-Din II. The latter had been developing ties with the Medici, who at the time wielded significant influence in the Papacy. The Druze emir donated land to the Maronite Church, namely the village of Majd al-Maush, which the patriarchs could use as a residence. In 1610 Pope Paul V instructed Makhlouf in a letter to forge ties with Fakhr al-Din, who was seeking Maronite support against his rival, Yusuf Sayfa.

Makhlouf had the church of St. Mura rebuilt in Kfarzeina in 1632. He died in the following year.

== Bibliography ==
- Abu-Husayn, Abdul-Rahim (1985). Provincial Leaderships in Syria, 1575–1650. Beirut: American University of Beirut. ISBN 9780815660729.
- Dau, Boutros (1984). History of the Maronites: Religious, Cultural, and Political.
- Dib, Pierre (1971). History of the Maronite Church. Detroit: Maronite Apostolic Exarchate.
- Harris, William (2012). Lebanon: A History, 600–2011. New York: Oxford University Press. ISBN 978-0-19-518-111-1.
- Salibi, Kamal S. (February 1973). "The Sayfās and the Eyalet of Tripoli 1579–1640". Arabica. 20 (1): 25–52. doi:10.1163/15700585-02001004. JSTOR 4056003. S2CID 247635304.
- Salibi, K. (February 1968). "The Muqaddams of Bšarrī: Maronite Chieftains of the Northern Lebanon 1382–1621". Arabica. 15 (1): 63–86. doi:10.1163/157005868X00280. JSTOR 4056124.
- Salibi, K. (2005). A House of Many Mansions: The History of Lebanon Reconsidered. London: I.B. Tauris. ISBN 978-1-86064-912-7.
