= Lebanese Council of 1736 =

Maronite Synod in 1736

- Date: September 30–2 October 1736
- Accepted by: Catholic Church
- Convoked by: Yusuf ibn Siman as-Simani
- President: Yusuf ibn Siman as-Simani
- Topics: Reform, Latinisation of liturgy, church discipline
- Documents and statements: Twelve decrees, definition of dioceses

The Lebanese Council of 1736 (Arabic: al-Majma al-Lubnanī, also Council of Mount Lebanon or Council of Luwayza) was a synod of the Maronite Church held from 30 September to 2 October that year at the monastery of Our Lady of Luwayza near Zouk Mosbeh, Lebanon. The council dealt with the need of the Maronite church to reform, its dependency on the aristocracy and the rights of the patriarchs. Though the implementation of its decrees took several decades, the synod is considered a major event in Maronite history due to its importance and magnitude.

== Background ==
At the beginning of the eighteenth century, the Maronite church came to be dominated by various tensions and conflicts, of which three issues stood particularly out: the patriarchal authority towards the bishops, the dependency of the church on the Maronite nobility and a tension towards two differing visions of the Maronite church.

In the Maronite Church, the patriarch exercised centralised authority and absolute control over the fiscal affairs of the church. As such, he alone held the monopoly over the consecration of oil and its distribution and required all clergy to obtain the oil in person in exchange for "gifts". There was no clear and set method to nominating and selecting bishops, which resulted in the sale of church offices by some patriarchs, corruption and the interference of secular and religious authorities. Further, the number of bishops was not fixed and varied between nine and fourteen, of which some were appointed as honorary bishops without a diocese or residing with their flock. The latter meant that bishops would exert nominal control over their diocese from which they derived revenue without while delegating the duties of a bishop to subordinate clerics.

The Maronite Church had depended largely on Maronite nobility for protection and means of subsistence up to the eighteenth century. The weak resources of the Church meant that it had to rely on noble families for the building of churches and monasteries but also that it was dependent on these families for security and protection of its communities. However, this resulted in frequent interference of the nobles in the internal affairs of the Church and limited its ability to meet the spiritual needs of its community. These constraints became apparent after the significant growth and subsequent gradual spread of the Maronites throughout the Lebanon after the sixteenth century and seventeenth century. The interference was noted especially in the election of clergy: as such, in the eighteen century, six of the eight patriarchs and fifteen of its twenty bishops belonged to the notable Maronite families, mostly the Khazen family.

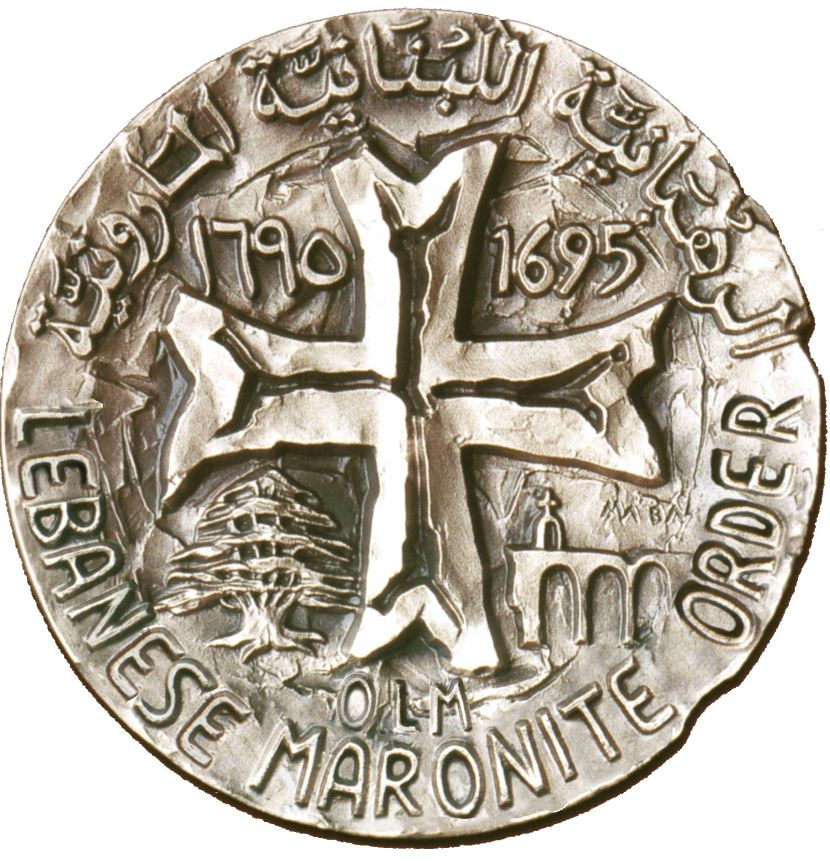
Logo of the Lebanese Maronite Order, whose members advocated for reform of the Maronite Church

Finally, there was a conflict between a faction of the Maronite clergy who wanted to reform the Church and those who sought to keep the existing structure in place. To a certain extent, this came out of a generational split between a generation of younger clerics who had for the most part attained a higher degree of education in Aleppo or Rome and older clergy who had been born in the middle of the seventeenth century. The first group counted among its proponents many members of the Lebanese Maronite Order, such as Abdallah Qara'ali, as well as Latin missionaries, who hoped to bring the Maronite Church into closer compliance with the reforms issued by the Council of Trent between 1545 and 1563.

The Maronite Church had entered into formal union with the Latin Church in the twelfth century and started to introduce Latin practices (Latinisation) under pope Innocent III. However, contacts broke down after the fall of the Crusader states and only increased again in the fifteen and sixteenth century. The Ottomans, who occupied the Lebanon from 1516 onwards, viewed the adherence of the Maronite Church to Rome suspiciously, especially during the sixteenth and seventeenth century. Due to the intervention of France, who was both an ally to the Ottomans and patron of the Maronites, the Maronite patriarchs were able to maintain some independence from the Ottoman government.

At the same time, Jesuit and Franciscan missions were established among the Maronites which led to the subsequent education of the Maronite elite in the spirit of European Christianity. This also resulted in more systematic Latinisation: whereas previously the Maronite Church had only taken over some practices over from the Latin Church such as wearing Latin vestments by the Maronite clergy, a new romanised missal was adopted in 1592. Latinisation was increased especially through Maronite clergy returning home from being educated at the Pontifical Maronite College, such as the patriarch George Omaira, whose policy enraged more conservative bishops. In 1733, the reformers sent a letter to Rome enumerating the various reforms required for the Maronite Church from their perspective.

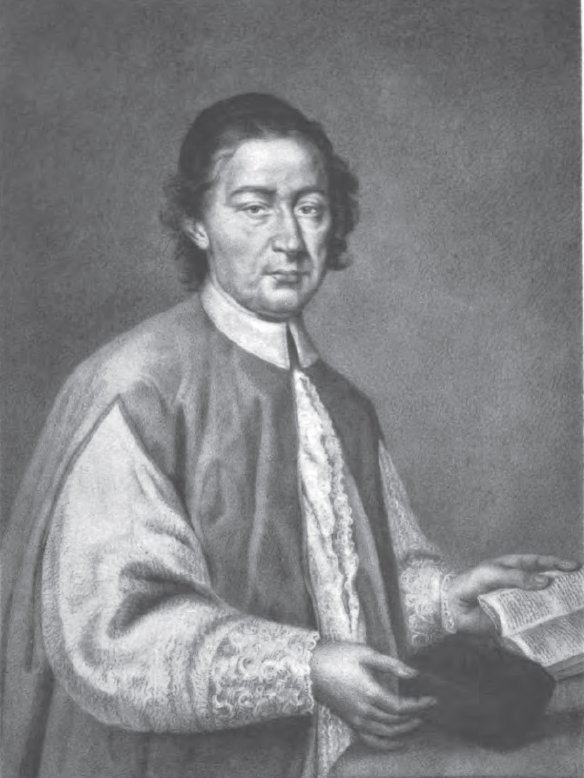
Yusuf ibn Siman as-Simani, a Maronite himself, presided over the Council of Lebanon

All of these issues resulted in the common desire of the Maronite clergy and laity for a council as they wanted to remedy these problems in their church. As such, the Maronite Church and prominent layment appealed to Pope Clement XII to send Yusuf ibn Siman as-Simani (known in the West as Joseph Assemani), an alumnus of the Maronite College and famous scholar, as his legate to convene a council. Joseph Assemani arrived in Beirut with instructions by the Congregatio de Propaganda Fide on 17 June 1736 and read the instructions of the pope and the Congregation to patriarch Yusuf Dirham al-Khazin and the clergy on 1 July. This led to full-blown arguments pitting Patriarch Yusuf and his party against Joseph Assemani, several bishops belonging to the Lebanese Order and the Latin missionaries, especially on the topics of the consecrated oil, the number and boundaries of the dioceses, the assignation of a bishop to oversee them and the separation of monks and nuns into different houses. When the reformers did not yield, the patriarch asked his nephew Shayk Nawfal al-Khazin to come. Shayk Nawfal then arrived with others and began to threaten the bishops to force them to sign whatever the Patriarch asked of them. This resulted in the end of the first council and only after Joseph Assemani got the support of the French consul to put pressure on the Khazen family to not interfere in the affairs of the councils, a new council was called.

== The Council ==
The Council convened on 30 September at the monastery of Our Lady of Luwayza and continued for three days. The council was attended by all Maronite religious elite as well as key Latin missionaries in Mount Lebanon and Syria. Among the participants were thirteen Maronite bishops and the famous scholar Mikhael Ghaziri (known in the West as Miguel Casiri), who represented the bishop of Tripoli. In order to gain popular and civic support, the council was also attended by delegations of the Lebanese feudal families, turning the council into something of general or national assembly. After three deliberations, twelve decrees were issued, though later arguments about its legality and even about its text continued into the nineteenth century.

The council established for the first time definitive diocesan boundaries, created eight dioceses in the process: six in Lebanon, one for Cyprus and one for Aleppo. The discussions on the fixed residences of the bishops in their diocese, though one of the most discussed ones, resulted in the creation of several clauses that aimed to prevent absenteeism. The council further forbade the practice of allowing the nobility to participate in the election of the patriarch and the selection of the bishops.

The council also affirmed previous Pro-Roman synods, accepted the Roman catechism and inserted the name of the pope into Syriac litugries. Among the affirmed practises were those that pope Innocent III had already recommended to patriarch Jeremias II al-Amshitti in the early thirteenth century; the council declared it the duty of every Maronite to obey them. This included among other things the separation of baptism and confirmation, performing baptism by pouring water over the head instead of full immersion, allowing mothers who had given birth to attend church before forty days had passed and the use of unleavened bread in the eucharistic service.

The council also ordered that Arabic, which had been the dominant language of the Maronites since the second millennium, be the official language of the Maronites and be taught next to Syriac, the Maronite liturgical language. Finally, the Council urged the Maronite clergy to create schools in every village in order to teach all men and women in Arabic, not in Turkish which the Ottomans were trying to impose. Moreover, the council made a resolution to revise and codify the law for personal status, which was taken up by Abdallah Qara'ali.

== Implementation ==
The decisions of the council received formal papal approval by Pope Benedict XIV on 1 September 1741 and thus acquired the force of pontifical law. Nevertheless, the implementation of all decrees of the synod took significant time, especially with respect to the observance of regulations about the residence of bishops and on the abolition of mixed monasteries. Nine councils were held by the Maronite Church between 1744 and 1856 to fully implement the decrees of the Lebanese council, with another council at the monastery of Luwayza forbidding definitely the practice of mixed monasteries in 1818. Apart from the resistance of certain Maronite clergy, the reasons lay in the difference between the Arabic and Latin version of the decrees. It was patriarch Joseph Peter Hobaish, a strong defender of the 1736 council, that finally accepted the Latin text of the synod and started implementing it in 1835. However, it was only during the long, stabilising patriarchate of Paul Peter Massad that the Maronite Church was firmly established within the Roman Catholic framework while retaining many of its distinctive features.

From the twentieth century onwards, the Catholic Church under the popes Pius XI and Pius XII started appreciating the quality and worth of the Eastern rites and the approach to Latinisation changed. The Second Vatican Council, which emphasised ecumenism, decreed that the Eastern rites should be held in high esteem because of their venerable antiquity. In this light, some ancient traditions (such as Syriac vestments for the clergy) were reintroduced and in 1972, the Sacred Congregation for the Eastern Churches proposed a reform of the Maronite liturgy to restore some of the Maronite ancient liturgy.

== Legacy ==
The council was possibly the most important event in Maronite Church history as no council of the magnitude and importance had taken place before it. Though the implementation of the decrees of the council was slow and difficult, it led to a thorough reform of the Church and the gradual emancipation of the Maronite Church from the tutelage of the Maronite aristocratic families. This led also to tension between the two parties as the notables resented their loss of power over the Church as well as the loss of lands to the Church. The increased independence also led to an increase performance among the Church's flock, with its supervision of various schools and foundation of religious societies for lay people.

Further, the Maronite educational system, which later educated both Christians and Muslims alike and still has some surviving schools today, produced several important thinkers and writers such as such as Boutros al-Boustani, Gibran Khalil Gibran, Maroun Abboud, Said Akl, and others. The focus on Arabic as language, at a time when other ethnicities, including Muslims, started to adopt Turkish as their language, resulted in the Maronites to be among the first pioneers of Modern Arab culture and literature.

== Bibliography ==
- Abouzayd, Shafiq (2019). "The Maronite Church". In King, Daniel (ed.). The Syriac world. London: Routledge. ISBN 978-1-138-89901-8.
- Atiya, ʿAzīz Sūryāl (1968). "Part VI: The Maronite Church". A history of Eastern Christianity. London: Methuen & Co Ltd. ISBN 978-1-032-50561-9.
- Hakim, Carol (19 January 2013). The Origins of the Lebanese National Idea: 1840–1920. University of California Press. ISBN 978-0-520-95471-7.
- Khater, Akram Fouad (28 November 2011). Embracing the Divine: Passion and Politics in Christian Middle East. Syracuse University Press. ISBN 978-0-8156-5057-7.
- Moosa, Matti (2005). The Maronites in History. New York: Gorgias Press. ISBN 1-59333-182-7.
- O’Mahony, Anthony (2008). "Syriac Christianity in the modern Middle East". In Angold, Michael (ed.). The Cambridge History of Christianity - Volume 5: Eastern Christianity. Cambridge University Press. ISBN 978-0-521-81113-2.
- Van Leeuwen, Richard (1994). Notables and Clergy in Mount Lebanon: The Khāzin Sheikhs and the Maronite Church, 1736-1840. Brill. ISBN 978-90-04-09978-4.
