= Joseph Tyan =

Head of the Maronite Church from 1796 to 1809

Joseph VII Tyan (يوسف السابع تيّان)
- Patriarch of Antioch
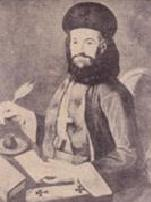
- Church: Maronite Church
- See: Patriarch of Antioch
- Elected: April 28, 1796
- Term ended: 1809
- Predecessor: Philip Gemayel
- Successor: John Helou

Orders
- Ordination: (Priest) 1784
- Consecration: (Bishop) August 6, 1786 by Joseph Estephan

Personal details
- Born: March 15, 1760 Beirut
- Died: February 20, 1820 (aged 59) Qannubin Monastery, Kadisha Valley

Joseph VII Peter Tyan (born on March 15, 1760, in Beirut, Lebanon – died on February 20, 1820, in Qannubin, Lebanon) (or Youssef Tyan, Youssef Tiyen, Thian, Tian, Tyen, Al-Tiyyan, Arabic: يوسف السابع تيّان) was the 66th Maronite Patriarch of Antioch from 1796 until his resignation in 1809.

== Life ==
Joseph Tyan was born in Beirut, Lebanon, on March 15, 1760. He studied in Rome in the College of the Propaganda where he remained from 1773 to 1782. In 1783 and 1784 he played an important role in supporting Patriarch Joseph Estephan's reconciliation with the Roman authorities. Joseph Tyan was ordained as a priest in 1784, and he was appointed Maronite bishop of the Maronite Catholic Archeparchy of Damascus and consecrated on August 6, 1786, by Patriarch Joseph Estephan. Even if Rome judged his episcopal ordination as not in line with the current rules, Tyan was appointed Patriarchal Vicar in 1788.

After the death of Patriarch Joseph Estephan in 1793, two short-reigning Patriarchs followed, and finally on April 28, 1796, Joseph Tyan was elected patriarch, though opposed by the Khazen Sheikhes. His election was confirmed by Pope Pius VI on July 24, 1797.

In March 1801 Joseph Tyan wrote an encyclical to his faithful against the Jansenistic doctrine of Germanos Adam, thus defending papal primacy.

Patriarch Joseph Tyan took a stand against the Ottoman government, and during the French Campaign in Egypt and Syria he supported Napoleon in the siege of Acre (1799), urging Maronites to volunteer and asking Emir Bashir II to ally himself with Napoleon. Despite Tyan's hopes, Emir Bashir remained neutral and the British-Ottoman alliance defeated Napoleon at Akko.

The difficulties of the Patriarchate of Joseph Tyan increased; he came in conflict with Emir Bashir II not only for his support of Napoleon, but also for the excessive taxes the Emir imposed on the Maronite peasants. He also had to face the discontent of some of his bishops, led by the Khazen Sheikhes, who in 1800 wrote to Rome complaining that Tyan illegally took church properties and instigated discord. Actually the real reason for the Khazen Sheikhes' opposition to him seems to have been his attempt to implement reform of the administration of the monasteries, which in great measure were owned by the Sheikhes. Only Tyan's successor, John Helou, could start such reform with the 1818 synod.

Due to the above difficulties, in 1805 the Vatican appointed an Apostolic visitor in the Maronite Patriarchate, Germanos El Khazen bishop of Damascus, followed on March 7, 1807, by Aloisio Gandolfi, who took a stand against Joseph Tyan, and advised him to retire. On October 3, 1807, Patriarch Joseph Tyan wrote a letter to Rome with his resignation, that was communicated to the Maronite bishops on November 19, 1808. Consequently, Aloisio Gandolfi summoned a meeting of all the bishops in Harissa in April 1809. A short time later, on June 8, 1809, John Helou was elected Patriarch.

Joseph Tyan retired in a hermitage and later moved to Kfarhaye (Batroun District) to teach theology in the newly erected seminary of Saint Maron. He died in odour of sanctity on February 20, 1820, in the patriarchal residence of the Qannubin Monastery, in the Kadisha Valley.

== See also ==
- List of Maronite Patriarchs
- Maronite Church
