= Hasroun =

City in North Governorate of Lebanon

Hasroun حصرون
- City
- Location within Lebanon
- Coordinates: 34°14′31″N 35°58′46″E
- Country: Lebanon
- Governorate: North Governorate
- District: Bsharri District
- Elevation: 1,600 m (5,200 ft)
- Highest elevation: 1,600 m (5,200 ft)
- Lowest elevation: 1,450 m (4,760 ft)

Population
  - Total: 12,000
- Time zone: UTC+2 (EET)
  - Summer (DST): UTC+3 (EEST)
- Dialing code: +961

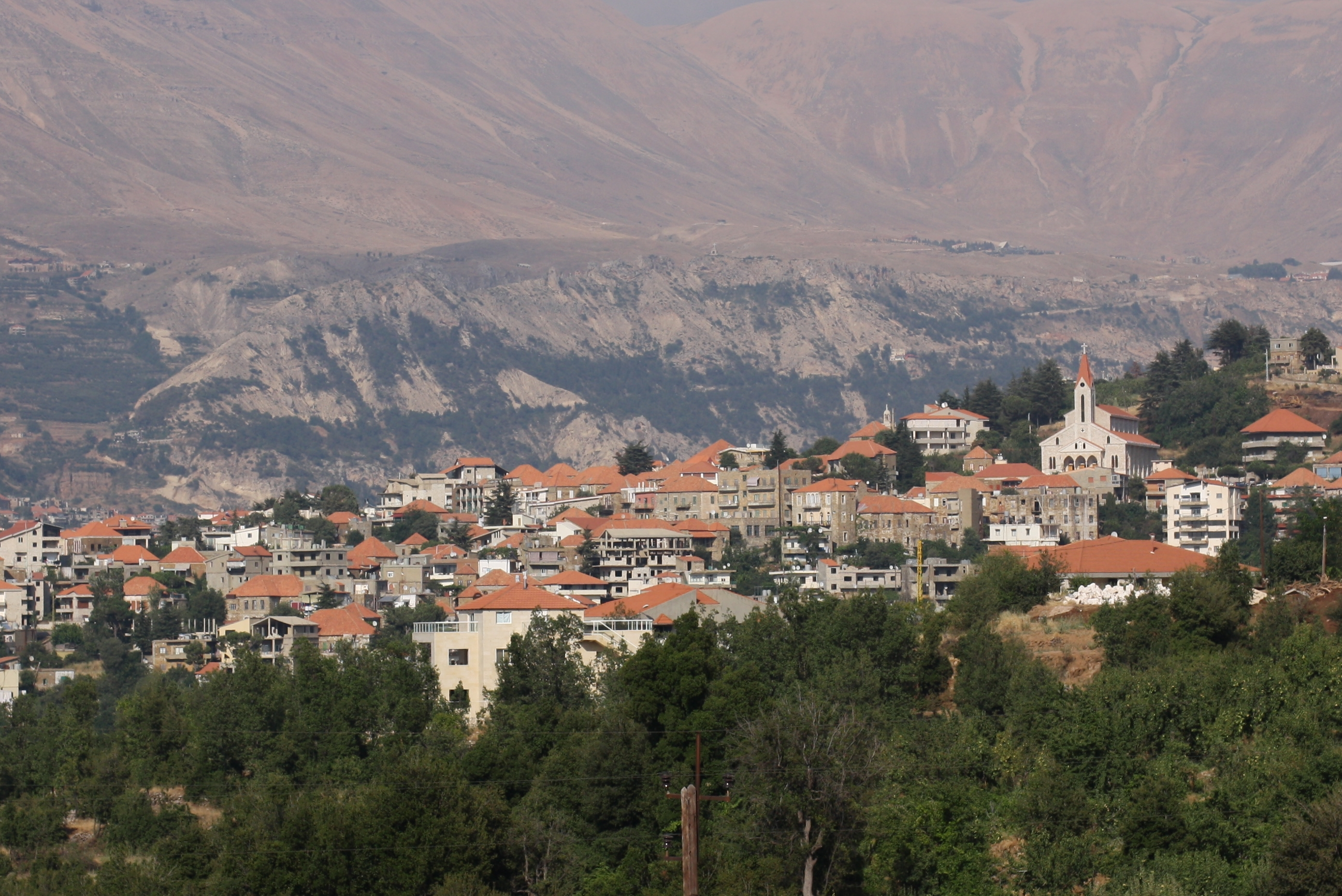

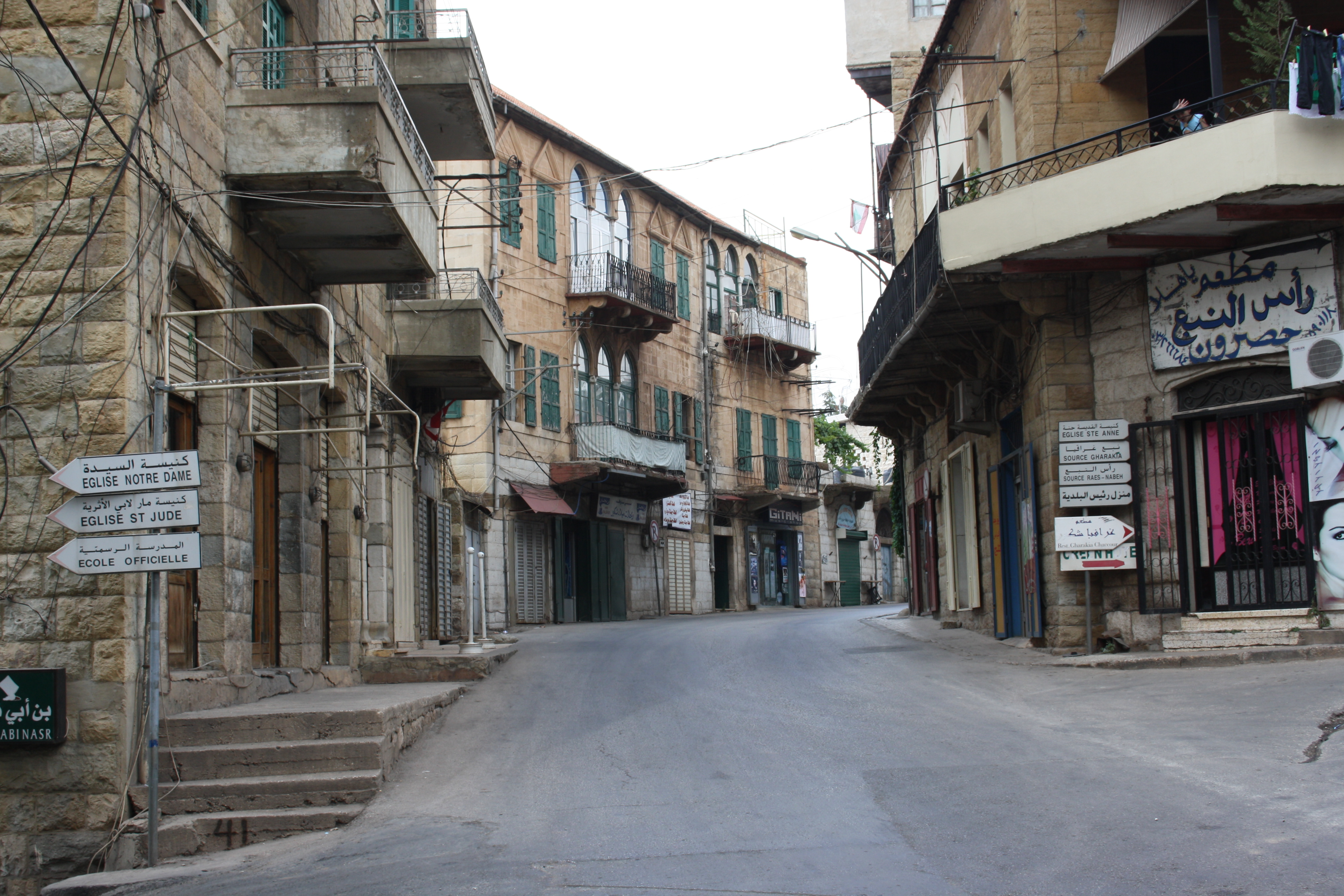
Hasroun, center of the village

Hasroun (also Hasrun or Hasroon, Arabic: حصرون ) is a village located in the Bsharri District in the North Governorate of Lebanon. It is situated in the Valley of Qadisha, overlooking the southern branch of this valley, the Qannoubine Valley.

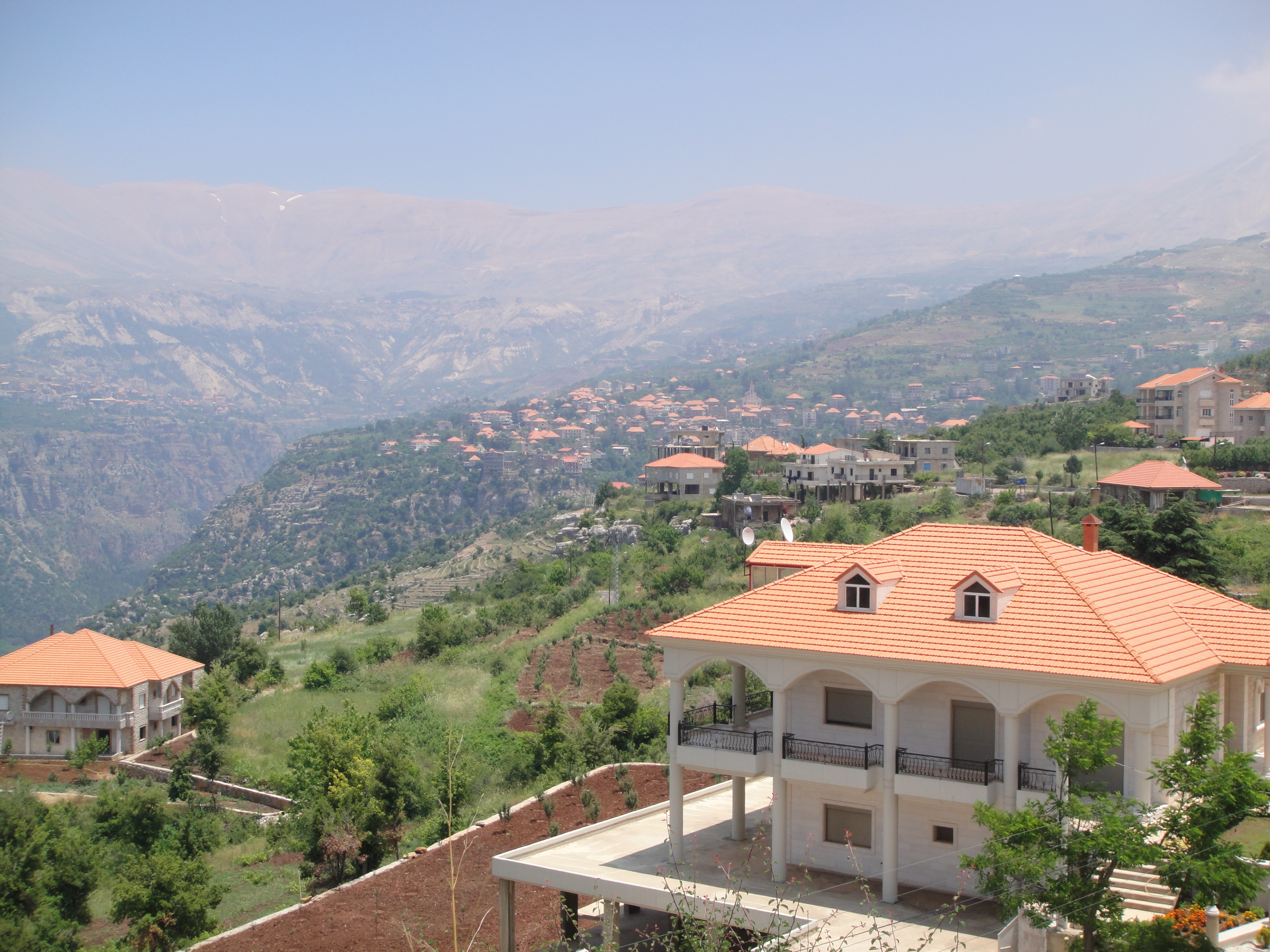
View of Hasroun

It owes its nickname of the Rose of Mount Lebanon to its predominantly red-tiled roof houses. The population is Maronite Catholic.

Hasroun gave the Maronite Church two Patriarchs, Patriarch Jacob Aouad (1705-1733) and Patriarch Simon Aouad (1743-1756). From Hasroun came also the noted family of orientalists, the Assemani, among them the famous Giuseppe Simone Assemani, author of Bibliotheca Orientalis and Ephraemi Syri opera omnia quae extant.

== Demographics ==
In 2014 Christians made up 99.05% of registered voters in Hasroun. 93.89% of the voters were Maronite Catholics.

== Twin Towns ==
- Marmaris, Turkey
