= Joseph Dergham El Khazen =

Head of the Maronite Church from 1733 to 1742

Joseph V (Dergham) El Khazen (يوسف الخامس ضرغام الخازن)
- Patriarch of Antioch
- Church: Maronite Church
- See: Patriarch of Antioch
- Elected: February 25, 1733
- Term ended: May 13, 1742
- Predecessor: Jacob Awad
- Successor: Simon Awad

Orders
- Consecration: 1728 (Bishop) by Jacob Awad

Personal details
- Born: Ghosta, Lebanon
- Died: May 13, 1742

Joseph V Dergham El Khazen (or Yusuf Dargham al-Khazin, Arabic: يوسف الخامس ضرغام الخازن, Latin: Ioseph Dargam Alchasen, born in Ghosta, Lebanon - died on May 13, 1742), was the 60th Maronite Patriarch of Antioch from 1733 to his death in 1742.

== Life ==
=== Early life ===
Joseph Dergham El Khazen was a member of the Khazen family and he was born in the village of Ghosta, in the Keserwan District, Lebanon. He married, and after the death of his wife he became priest. He was consecrated titular bishop of Ghosta in 1728 by the hands of patriarch Jacob Awad. At the death of Jacob Awad, the electoral synod couldn't decide between two pretenders, so finally on February 25, 1733, he was elected for acclamation because of his influential family. The confirmation of his election by Pope Clement XII arrived on December 18, 1733, with the brief Cum nos a vinculo and El Khazen received the pallium.

=== Lebanese Council of 1736 ===
The need for reform of the Maronite Church, the ecclesiastical discipline of the religious establishments and the need to establish canonically dioceses, pushed the bishops, the clergy and the notables of the country to write to Rome to request the intervention of the Holy See with the sending Giuseppe Simone Assemani as apostolic delegate to Rome. During the works, Joseph Dergham clashed often with Giuseppe Simone Assemani, who presided it, due to the fact that the synod was going to limit the faculties of the Patriarch Assemani arrived in Lebanon, with full powers and instructions of Propaganda Fide, on June 17, 1736. After three months of preparation, the synod was announced on 30 September and on 1 and 2 October. Among the main points discussed by the assembly: the separation of mixed monasteries, the division of patriarchy in eparchies, the training of clergy, the discipline of the sacraments, and economic issues. The documents, written in Arabic, were signed by all present on October 2, 1736. Assemani, before returning to Rome, proceeded, on behalf of the same patriarch, to immediately running some decisions of the Synod, but he found some pockets of resistance especially in the issue of the separation of mixed monasteries, where religious men and women were living under the same roof, although separated from the enclosure.

About the serious problem of the canonical erection of the Maronite diocese, it must be remembered that until the eighteenth century the Maronite Patriarchate had only formally divided into eparchies: all bishops were regarded as auxiliary of the Maronite Patriarch, the only real guide of the Maronite nation. On some occasions Propaganda Fide had intervened earlier to order the canonical subdivision of patriarchy, but his decrees had remained a dead letter. The Synod of 1736 instituted canonically eight eparchies, over the patriarchal seat, defining its territorial jurisdictions: Aleppo, Beirut, Byblos coupled with Batroun (Botrys), Cyprus, Damascus, Baalbek (Heliopolis), Tripoli and Tyre-Sidon.

=== After the council ===
Only in 1738 Assemani left Lebanon, where he had expressed strong resistance to certain decisions of the Synod; but due to other assignments received, he reached Rome only in 1741. Some years after the Synod, Joseph Dergham sent a petition to the Pope to support his views and to make void the decrees of the synod, however Pope Clement XII established a special commission of cardinals to investigate the acts of the Synod, this committee was confirmed by the next Pope Benedict XIV. Their acts were approved definitively, in their Latin translation, on 1 September 1741 with the papal bull Singularis Romanorum, while the Apostolic praedecessorum of 14 February 1742, confirmed the decisions of the Maronite Synod on the division of patriarchy in eparchies, their number and their spatial extent and discarded El Khazen's petition.

Joseph Dergham El Khazen died on May 13, 1742.

== See also ==
- List of Maronite Patriarchs
- Maronite Church

== Additional References ==
- Patriarch Joseph V Dergham El-Khazen (Catholic-Hierarchy)

== Sources ==
- Pierre Dib, v. Maronite (Eglise), https://archive.org/stream/dictionnairedet10pt1vaca#page/n47/mode/2up, Tome Dixième, première partie, Paris 1928, coll. 79–85.
- Giuseppe Simone Assemani, https://archive.org/stream/serieschronologi00asseuoft#page/40/mode/2up, Rome 1881, p. 40.
- Konrad Eubel, Hierarchia Catholica Medii Aevi, https://archive.org/stream/hierarchiacathol06eubeuoft#page/87/mode/1up, p. 87.
- https://books.google.com/books?id=iUVJAAAAYAAJ Romae MDCCCXX.
- Rouhana, Paul (24 November 2010). "Histoire du Synode libanais de 1736 : du patriarcat de Jacques Aouad 1705 - 1733 jusqu'à la célébration solennelle du Synode 30 sept. - 2 oct. 1736". Parole de l'Orient. hdl:2042/35154.
