= Giuseppe Simone Assemani =

Lebanese Maronite, librarian, and Catholic bishop (1687–1768)

- Titular Archbishop of Tyre
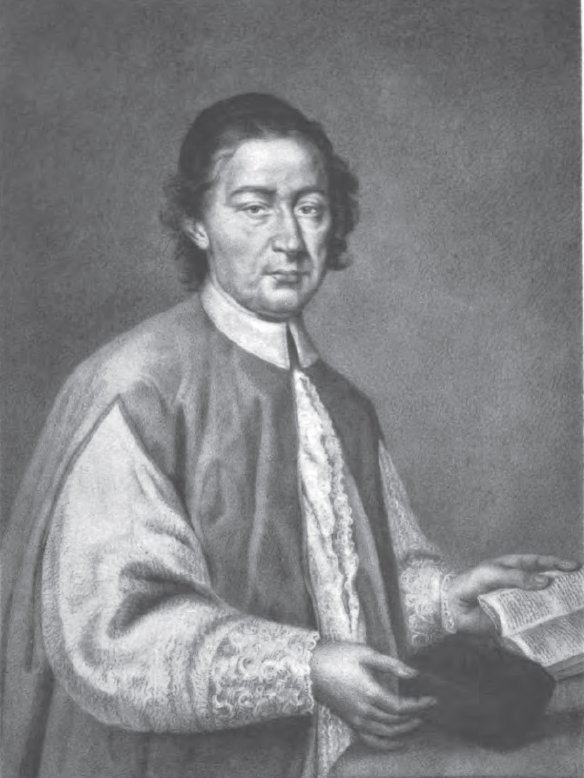
- Church: Maronite Church (to 1711); Latin Church (from 1711)

Orders
- Consecration: 7 December 1766

Personal details
- Born: 27 July 1687 Hasroun, North Lebanon, Lebanon
- Died: January 13, 1768 (aged 80) Rome, Italy

Giuseppe Simone Assemani (Classical Syriac : ܝܵܘܣܸܦ ܒܲܪ ܫܸܡܥܘܿܢ, Arabic: يوسف بن سمعان السمعاني Yusuf ibn Siman as-Simani, English: Joseph Simon Assemani, Latin: Iosephus Simonius Assemanus; July 27, 1687 – January 13, 1768) was a librarian, Lebanese Maronite orientalist, and Catholic bishop. For his efforts, and his encyclopedic knowledge, he earned the nickname "The Great Assemani".

== Life ==
Giuseppe Simone Assemani was born on 27 July 1687 in Hasroun, North Lebanon into the Assemani family. His surname is related to several distinguished Orientalists and clergy. "Assemani" is an Arabic patronymic which means son of Simeon, but this did not prevent him from being called Simon. When very young, in 1703, he was sent to the Maronite College in Rome, and was transferred thence to the Vatican Library. Assemani graduated in 1709. A talented graduate (at that time he had written three essays on the Syriac grammar and theology), he was spotted by Pope Clement XI, who kept him in Rome and ordered him to catalogue early Christian manuscripts that were brought in 1707 from Egypt by his brother Elias. In 1710, Giuseppe worked as scribe of Oriental manuscripts (scriptor Orientalis), translator from Arabic and Syriac languages, and advisor to the Congregation for the review and reform of the liturgical books of the Eastern rites. He was ordained priest on 21 September 1710.

In 1711 Assemani received papal authorization to pass from the Maronite Church to the Latin Church. From 1715 to 1717 he was sent to Wadi El Natrun, Cairo, Damascus and Lebanon to search for valuable manuscripts, and returned with about 150, which formed a collection in the Vatican Library. In 1735 Pope Clement XII sent him again to the East where he presided the Lebanese Council of 1736, which laid the foundations for the modern Maronite Church. He returned with a still more valuable collection, because he found the opportunity to collect even more ancient works. This time he brought about 2,000 works, and the most important of them was the Codex Assemanius, an evangeliary which he had brought from Jerusalem in 1736. He later played a significant role in mediating several crises in the Maronite Church hierarchy, by virtue of his influence in Rome and his knowledge of the Maronite Church.

In 1738, Assemani was back in Lebanon, and a year later was made First Librarian of the Vatican Library. He was also appointed by Carlo di Borbone as an official chronicler of the Kingdom of Naples.

In Rome he began elaborating plans to publish the most valuable of his collected works. His translation of Ephrem the Syrian's writings, his bibliography of Syriac writers from the Clementino-Vaticana Library, and his classification of Byzantine writings, are all worthy of mention.

In recognition of his achievements, he was appointed bishop on December 1, 1766 and consecrated titular archbishop of Tyre on December 7, 1766 by Cardinal Henry Benedict Stuart Duke of York and Titular bishop of Frascati; his co-consecrators were his nephew Stefano Evodio Assemani, Titular bishop of Apamea in Bithynia, and Nicholas-Xavier Santamarie, Titular bishop of Cyrene. He died in Rome on 13 January 1768. Part of his work was lost in his apartment during a fire on August 30, 1768.

His brother and nephew were also notable orientalists.

== Works ==
When appointed librarian of the Vatican Library, he instantly began to carry into execution most extensive plans for editing and publishing the most valuable manuscript treasures of the Vatican. His main work was Bibliotheca Orientalis Clementino-Vaticana in qua manuscriptos codices Syriacos, Arabicos, Persicos, Turcicos, Hebraicos, Samaritanos, Armenicos, Aethiopicos, Graecos, Aegyptiacos, Ibericos, et Malabaricos, jussu et munificentia Clementis XI Pontificis Maximi ex Oriente conquisitos, comparatos, et Bibliotecae Vaticanae addictos Recensuit, digessit, et genuina scripta a spuriis secrevit, addita singulorum auctorum vita, Joseph Simonius Assemanus, Syrus Maronita (Rome, 1719–1728), 9 vols folio.

Of the Bibliotheca the first three vols only were completed. The work was to have been in four parts:

1. Syrian and allied manuscripts: Orthodox, Church of the East, and Syriac Orthodox Church
2. Arabian manuscripts, Christian and Islam
3. Coptic, Aethiopic, Persian and Turkish manuscripts
4. Syrian and Arabian manuscripts not distinctively theological

Only the first part was completed, but extensive preparations were made for the others. There is a German abridgment by August Friedrich Pfeiffer (Erlangen 1770-77) and a Reprint (Hildesheim, New York: Olms o.J. ca. 1990).

Other works are:

- Ephraemi Syri opera omnia quae extant, Gr., Syr., et Lat., 6 vols. folio (Rome, 1737–1746). He edited the first three volumes. Volumes 4 and 5 were edited by the Maronite Jesuit Mubarak/Benedictus, and the 6th by his nephew Stefano Evodio Assemani.
- Italicae historiae scriptores ex bibliothecae Vaticanae aliarumque insignium Bibliothecarum manuscriptis codicibus collegit, e praefationibus, notisque illustravit Joseph Simonius Assemanus. Romae, ex typographia Komarek apud Angelum Rotilium, 1751.
- Codex canonum Ecclesiae graecae. Romae, ex typographia Komarek, 1762.
- De scriptoribus Syris orthodoxis. Romae, typis Sacrae Congregationis de Propaganda Fide, 1719.
- Bibliotheca juris orientalis canonici et civilis auctore Josepho Simonio Assemano. (5 voll.) Romae, ex typographia Komarek, 1762-1766.
- Italicae historiae scriptores ex Bibliothecae Vaticanae, aliarumque insignium bibliothecarum manuscriptis codicibus collegit & praefationibus, notisque illustravit Joseph Simonius Assemanus ... De rebus Neapolitanis et Siculis, ab anno Christi quingentesimo ad annum millesimum ducentesimum. (4 voll.) Romae, ex typographia Komarek, apud Angelum Rotilium, Linguarum Orientalium Typographum, 1751-1753.
- Josephi Simoni Assemani De Syris monophysitis dissertatio. Romae, ex typographia Sacrae Congregationis de propaganda fide, 1730.
- Josephi Simonii Assemani Quae hactenus typis prodierunt opera omnia. Romae, ex typographia Angeli Rotilii, & Philippi Bacchelli, e regione domus PP. Theatinorum S. Andreae de Valle, 1751.
- De sacris imaginibus et reliquiis, prévu en 5 volumes. Une partie des manuscrits fut sauvée et des extraits publiés par Bottarius (Rome, 1776).
- Kalendaria Ecclesiae universae, in quibus tum ex vetustis marmoribus, tum ex codicibus, tabulis, parietinis, pictis, scriptis, scalptisve, sanctorum nomina, imaagines, et festi per annum dies Ecclesiarum Orientis, et Occidentis praemissis uniuscujusque Ecclesiae originibus recensentur, describuntur, notisque illustrantur]. (6 vol.) Roma, sumptibus Fausti Amidei ..., 1755. Volumes 1 2 3 4 5 6
- Rudimenta linguae Arabicae cum catechesi christiana.... Romae, typis Sacrae Congregationis de Propaganda Fide, 1732.
- Nuova grammatica per apprendere agevolmente la lingua greca composta da monsignor Giuseppe Simonio Assemani. (2 voll.) In Urbino, nella stamperia della Ven. Cap. del SS. Sagramento per lo stampator Camerale, 1737.
- Oratio de eligendo summo Pontifice ad E. mos & R. mos Principes S.R.E. Cardinales habita in SS. Basilica Vaticana a Josepho Simonio Assemano, die 18 Februarii 1740. Romae, ex tipographia Apostolica Vaticana, apud Joannem Mariam Salvioni, 1740.
- Oratio habita in Basilica principis apostolorum de vrbe sie 22. februarii 1733. A Josepho Simonio Assemano ... dum a capitulo, et canonicis Benedicto XIII pontifici maximo solenne exequiae celebrarentur, antequam ejus corpus inde ad ecclesiam Santae Mariae supra Mineruam efferretur. Romae, & Ferrariae, Typis Bernardini Pomatelli impressoris episcopalis, 1733.
- Abraham Ecchellensis; Chronicon Orientale," publié dans "Scriptores Historiae Byzantinae," vol. XVII.
- Scriptorum Veterum Nova Collectio (Rome, 1831). Plusieurs dissertations, sur les Églises Orientales, publiées par le cardinal Angelo Mai.
- Bibliothecae apostolicae vaticanae codicum manuscriptorum catalogus in tres partes distributus in quarum prima orientales in altera graeci in tertia latini italici aliorumque europaeorum idiomatum codices Stephanus Evodius Assemanus archiepiscopus apamensis et Joseph Simonius Assemanus. Paris, Maisonneuve, 1926.

== Unpublished works ==
- "The ancient and the new Syria" (9 volumes);
- "The history of the East" (9 volumes);
- "Cathedrals of the Eastern Church" (6 volumes);
- "Euchologia Eastern Church" (7 volumes).

== Sources ==
- Vaccolini, D. (1834). "Assemani (Giuseppe Simone)". In de Tipaldo, Emilio (ed.). Biografia degli Italiani illustri nelle scienze: lettere ed arti del secolo XVIII. e de'contemporanei compilata da letterati Italiani di ogni provincia (in Italian). Vol. 1. Venice: Alvisopoli. pp. 328–330.
- Graf, Georg. 104. Joseph Simonius Assemani. [S.l.: s.n.], 1960.
- Bouillet, Marie-Nicolas; Chassang, Alexis (1878). "Giuseppe Simone Assemani". Universal Dictionary history and geography.
