= Stephen of Antioch =

Stephen of Antioch may refer to:

- Stephen I of Antioch, patriarch in 341–345 or in 342–344
- Stephen II of Antioch, patriarch in 477–479
- Stephen of Antioch, another name for Stephen of Pisa (fl. 12th century), Arabic translator
