= Babylas of Antioch =

Patriarch of Antioch from 237 to 253

Saint Babylas of Antioch
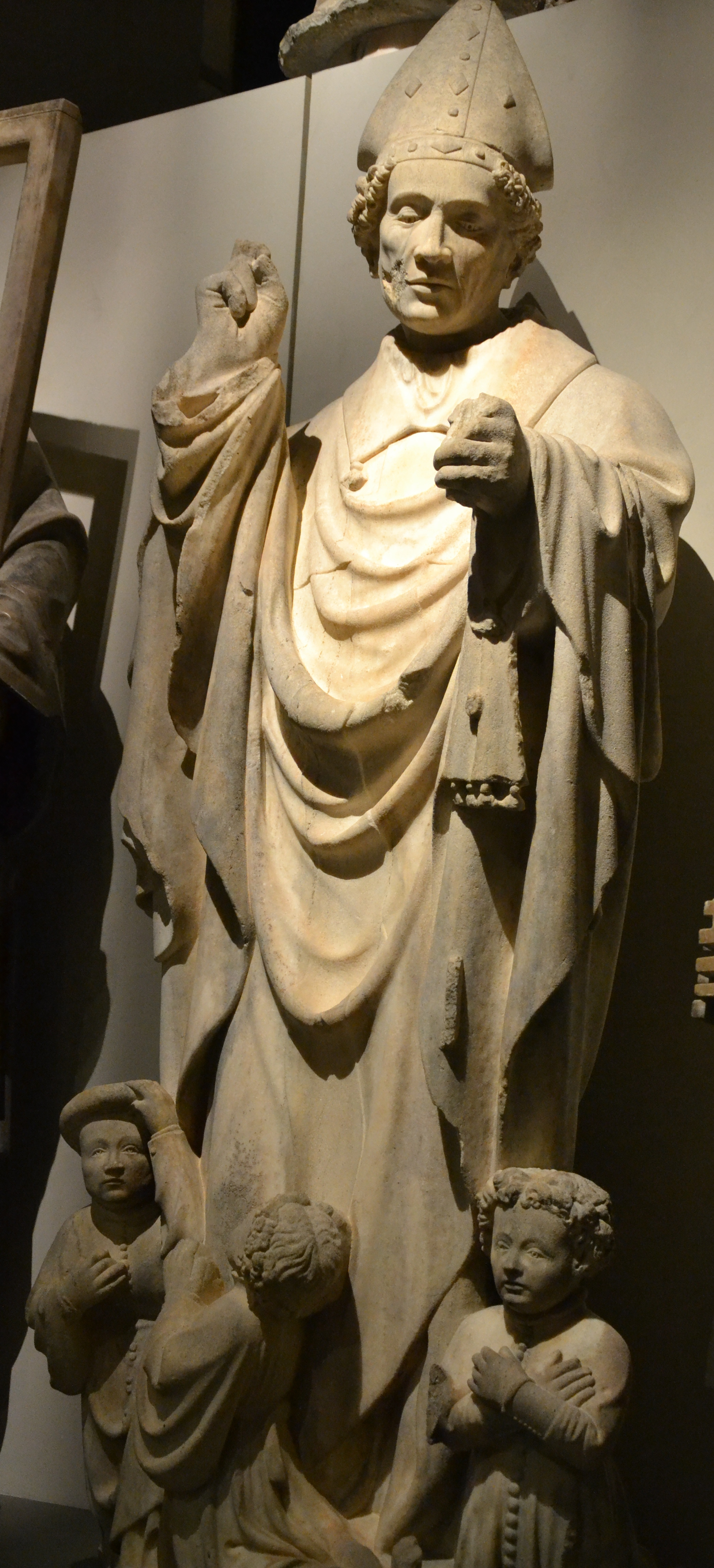
- "San Babila and the three little martyrs", Museo del Duomo di Milano

Patriarch of Antioch
- Died: 253
- Venerated in: Eastern Orthodox Church; Catholic Church
- Major shrine: Cremona, Italy
- Feast: Eastern Orthodox Church and Armenian Apostolic Church - 4 September; Catholic Church - 24 January

Babylas of Antioch (Koine Greek: Βαβυλᾶς, from Syriac: ܒܐܒܘܠܐ, romanized: Babūla; Arabic: بابل; died 253) was a Syrian patriarch of Antioch (237–253), who died in prison during the Decian persecution. In the Eastern Orthodox Church and Eastern Catholic Churches of the Byzantine rite his feast day is 4 September, in the Roman Rite, 24 January. He has the distinction of being the first saint recorded as having had his remains translated (moved) for religious purposes; a practice that was to become extremely common in later centuries.

== Life ==
Babylas was the successor of Zebinnus as Bishop of Antioch in the reign of the Emperor Gordian III (238–244), being the twelfth bishop of the see. During the Decian persecution (250) he made an unwavering confession of faith and was thrown into prison where he died from his sufferings. He was, therefore, venerated as a martyr.

John Chrysostom's homily upon Babylas and the Acts of the Martyrs report the following story, that Babylas once refused the visiting pagan emperor, on account of his sinful ways, permission to enter the church and had ordered him to take his place among the penitents. John does not give the name of the emperor; the Acts mention Numerian. It is more likely the contemporary Philip the Arab of whom Eusebius (Historia ecclesiastica, VI, 34) reports that a bishop would not let him enter the gathering of Christians at the Easter vigil. Later legend elaborates on this, stating that Babylas demanded that he do penance for his part in the murder of the young Gordian III before he would allow Philip to celebrate Easter.

== Veneration ==
In 351 the Caesar Constantius Gallus built a new church in honor of Babylas at Daphne, a suburb of Antioch, and had the remains of the bishop transferred to it. The intention of Gallus in translating the remains of Babylas to Daphne was to neutralize the pagan effects of the temple of Apollo located there, or, as Chrysostom expresses it, to "bring a physician to the sick".

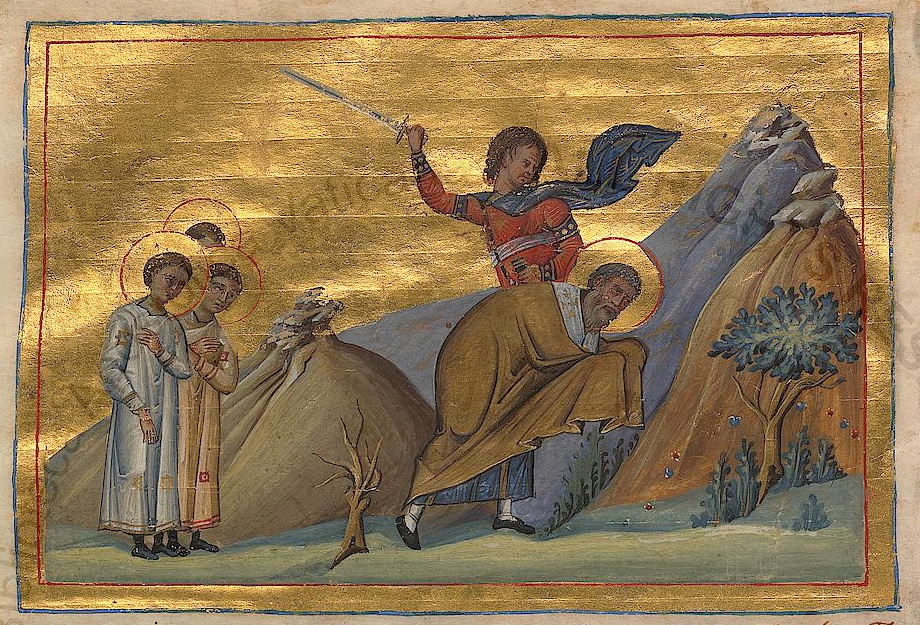
Miniature of the martyrdom of Saints Babylas, Urban, Prilidian, and Epolonius from the Menologion of Basil II

According to Chrysostom, when Emperor Julian consulted the oracle of Apollo at the temple in Daphne (362), he received no answer and was told that it was because of the proximity of Babylas. He therefore, had the sarcophagus of the martyr exhumed and taken back to his original place of burial. A few days later, on October 22, a mysterious fire broke out in the temple of Apollo, consuming the roof of the building, and the statue of the god, copied from Phidias's statue of Zeus at Olympia. Julian, suspecting angry Christians were responsible, ordered the cathedral of Antioch closed, and an investigation into the cause of the fire: Ammianus Marcellinus reports "a frivolous rumor" laid the blame to some candles lit by a worshipper late the previous night (XXII, 13). John Chrysostom claimed a bolt of lightning set the temple on fire. The remains of Babylas were reinterred in a church dedicated to him on the other side of the Orontes River. Near the close of his discourse, John Chrysostom refers to the erection of the church dedicated to Babylas, and to the zeal of the Bishop Meletius in promoting it, who actually took part in the work with his own hands.

This was the first recorded translation of the buried remains of a saint, something that was to become routine in the Middle Ages.

The columns and walls of the ruined temple were still pointed out twenty years later. In the Middle Ages, the remains of Babylas are said to have been moved to Cremona.

== Bibliography ==
- Frendo, David (2007). "Dangerous Ideas: Julian's Persian Campaign, Its Historical Background, Motivation, and Objectives". Bulletin of the Asia Institute. 21.

Titles of the Great Christian Church
Preceded by Zebinnus	Patriarch of Antioch; 237 – 253	Succeeded by Fabius
