= Evagrius of Antioch =

Evagrius of Antioch was a claimant to the See of Antioch from 388 to 392. He succeeded Paulinus and had the support of the Eustathian party, and was a rival to Flavian during the so-called Meletian schism. He is best known for his translation of Athanasius of Alexandria's Vita Antonii, which supplanted the earlier Latin translation and went on to enjoy great popularity in the Middle Ages.

== History ==
After Paulinus' death in 388, the Eustathians still resented Flavian for his relation to the hated Meletius, accused of being consecrated by Arians. So they elected Evagrius. According to Sozomen, he didn't last long.

According to Theodoret, the consecration of Evagrius by Paulinus was against canon law, because he did it alone, in his death bed. Nonetheless, he was accepted by the emperor and thus the schism persisted.

== Legacy ==
Paulinus and Evagrius, of Eusthatian party, were recognized in the West as the true bishops, while in the East the Meletian bishops, including Flavian, were regarded as legitimate.

He also translated the work Life of the Blessed Anthony, of Athanasius, from Greek into Latin.

== Notes ==
Preceded by Paulinus	Patriarch of Antioch; 388–392 with Flavian I (381–404)	Succeeded by Porphyrus
