= Philetus of Antioch =

Patriarch of Antioch, c. 218 – 231

- Patriarch of Antioch
- Church: Church of Antioch

Philetus of Antioch was the eleventh Patriarch of Antioch, between 218 or 220 and 231 AD, successor of Asclepiades in the Church of Antioch and predecessor of Zebinnus, according to Eusebius of Caesarea. His bishopric took place while Elagabalus and Severus Alexander were emperors.

== Notes and references ==
Titles of the Great Christian Church
Preceded by Asclepiades	Patriarch of Antioch; 218/220 – 231	Succeeded by Zebinnus
