= Patriarch Stephen =

Patriarch Stephen may refer to:

- Patriarch Stephen I of Antioch, ruled in 341–345 or in 342–344
- Patriarch Stephen II of Antioch, ruled in 477–479
- Stephen I of Constantinople, Ecumenical Patriarch of Constantinople in 886–893
- Stephen II of Constantinople, Ecumenical Patriarch of Constantinople in 925–928
