= John I of Antioch =

Patriarch of Antioch from 429 to 441

- Patriarch of Antioch
- Installed: 429
- Term ended: 441
- Predecessor: Theodotus of Antioch
- Successor: Domnus II of Antioch

Personal details
- Died: 441
- Denomination: Early Christianity

John I of Antioch was Patriarch of Antioch (429 – 441). He led a group of moderate Eastern bishops during the Nestorian controversy. He is sometimes confused with John Chrysostom, who is occasionally also referred to as John of Antioch. John I gave active support to his friend Nestorius in the latter's dispute with Cyril of Alexandria. In the year 431, he arrived too late for the opening meeting of the First Council of Ephesus. Cyril, suspecting John I of using procrastinating tactics to support Nestorius, decided not to wait and convened the council without John I and his supporters, condemning Nestorius. When John I reached Ephesus a few days after the council had begun, he convened a counter-council that condemned Cyril and vindicated Nestorius.

In this controversy, according to Cyril, partisans of John I arrived at the Council before the Patriarch, and informed Cyril that John would be significantly late in arriving, and that Cyril should proceed with the Council in his absence, telling him, "our lord, the bishop John, commanded us to say to your reverence 'if I am late, do what you are doing.'" Cyril relates how he waited for John I for all of 16 days before finally beginning the Council in John's absence. Cyril's account of these events can be found in Chapter 3 of his Letter to Komarius and Others.

Two years later, in 433 John I reconciled with Cyril based on the Formula of Reunion, a theological formula devised as a compromise. In the process, John I lost many of his own supporters within his patriarchate. Some of his letters are extant.

== Bibliography ==
- Grillmeier, Aloys (1975) [1965]. Christ in Christian Tradition - From the Apostolic Age to Chalcedon (451) (2nd revised ed.). Louisville: Westminster John Knox Press.
- McEnerney, John (2007). St. Cyril of Alexandria: Letters 1-50. Washington D.C.: Catholic University of America Press.
- McLeod, Frederick (2009). Theodore of Mopsuestia. London: Routledge.
- Loon, Hans van (2009). The Dyophysite Christology of Cyril of Alexandria. Leiden-Boston: Brill Publishers.
- Meyendorff, John (1989). Imperial Unity and Christian Divisions - The Church 450–680 A.D. Crestwood, NY: St. Vladimir's Seminary Press.
- Norris, Richard A., ed. (1980). The Christological Controversy. Minneapolis: Fortess Press.
- Pásztori-Kupán, István (2006). Theodoret of Cyrus. London and New York: Routledge.
- Perhai, Richard J. (2015). Antiochene Theoria in the Writings of Theodore of Mopsuestia and Theodoret of Cyrus. Minneapolis: Fortress Press.

Titles of the Great Christian Church
Preceded by Theodotus	Patriarch of Antioch; 429 – 441	Succeeded by Domnus II
