= Herodion of Antioch =

Bishop of Antioch from 107 to 127

Saint Herodion of Antioch

Bishop of Antioch
- Died: 136
- Venerated in: Catholic Church; Oriental Orthodoxy; Eastern Orthodoxy
- Canonized: Pre-Congregation

Herodion of Antioch or Heron (died 136 AD) was a 2nd-century Christian martyr and Bishop of Antioch, successor of Ignatius at Antioch, a title he held for two decades.

== Notes and references ==
Titles of the Great Christian Church
Preceded by Ignatius	Patriarch of Antioch; 107–127	Succeeded by Cornelius
