= Maximus of Antioch =

Patriarch of Antioch from 182 to 191

Maximus I of Antioch
- Patriarch of Antioch
- Installed: 182
- Term ended: 191
- Predecessor: Theophilus of Antioch
- Successor: Serapion of Antioch

Maximus I of Antioch was Patriarch of Antioch between 182 and 191. He is considered the eighth patriarch of Antioch, being the successor of Theophilus and predecessor of Serapion.

== Notes and references ==
Titles of the Great Christian Church
Preceded by Theophilus	Patriarch of Antioch; 182–191	Succeeded by Serapion
