= Martyrius of Antioch =

Patriarch of Antioch from 459 to 471

- Patriarch of Antioch
- Church: Church of Antioch
- Installed: 459
- Term ended: 471
- Predecessor: Acacius of Antioch
- Successor: Julian of Antioch

Personal details
- Denomination: Chalcedonian Christianity

Martyrius of Antioch was Patriarch of Antioch from 459 to 471. A Chalcedonian, his patriarchate was dominated by strife between the Chalcedonians and Non-Chalcedonians.

Martyrius was deposed by prominent Non-Chalcedonian Peter the Fuller in 470, the latter supported by Zeno, a general and son-in-law of Byzantine Emperor Leo I. Martyrius fled to Constantinople, where he was supported by Patriarch Gennadius of Constantinople, whose influence with Leo I secured Martyrius's brief restoration. However, Peter the Fuller soon forced out Martyrius again, himself occupying the patriarchate once more. Martyrius again appealed to Leo I, who again deposed Peter the Fuller, this time in favor of a new Chalcedonian successor, Julian of Antioch.

== Bibliography ==
- Meyendorff, John (1989). Imperial unity and Christian divisions - The Church 450-680 A.D. The Church in history. Vol. 2. Crestwood, NY: St. Vladimir's Seminary Press. ISBN 9780881410563.

Titles of Chalcedonian Christianity
Preceded by Acacius	Patriarch of Antioch; 459 – 471	Succeeded by Julian
