= Asclepiades of Antioch =

Patriarch of Antioch from 211 to 218

Saint Asclepiades of Antioch

Patriarch of Antioch
- Died: c. 218
- Venerated in: Eastern Orthodox Church; Roman Catholic Church
- Canonized: Pre-congregation
- Feast: 18 October

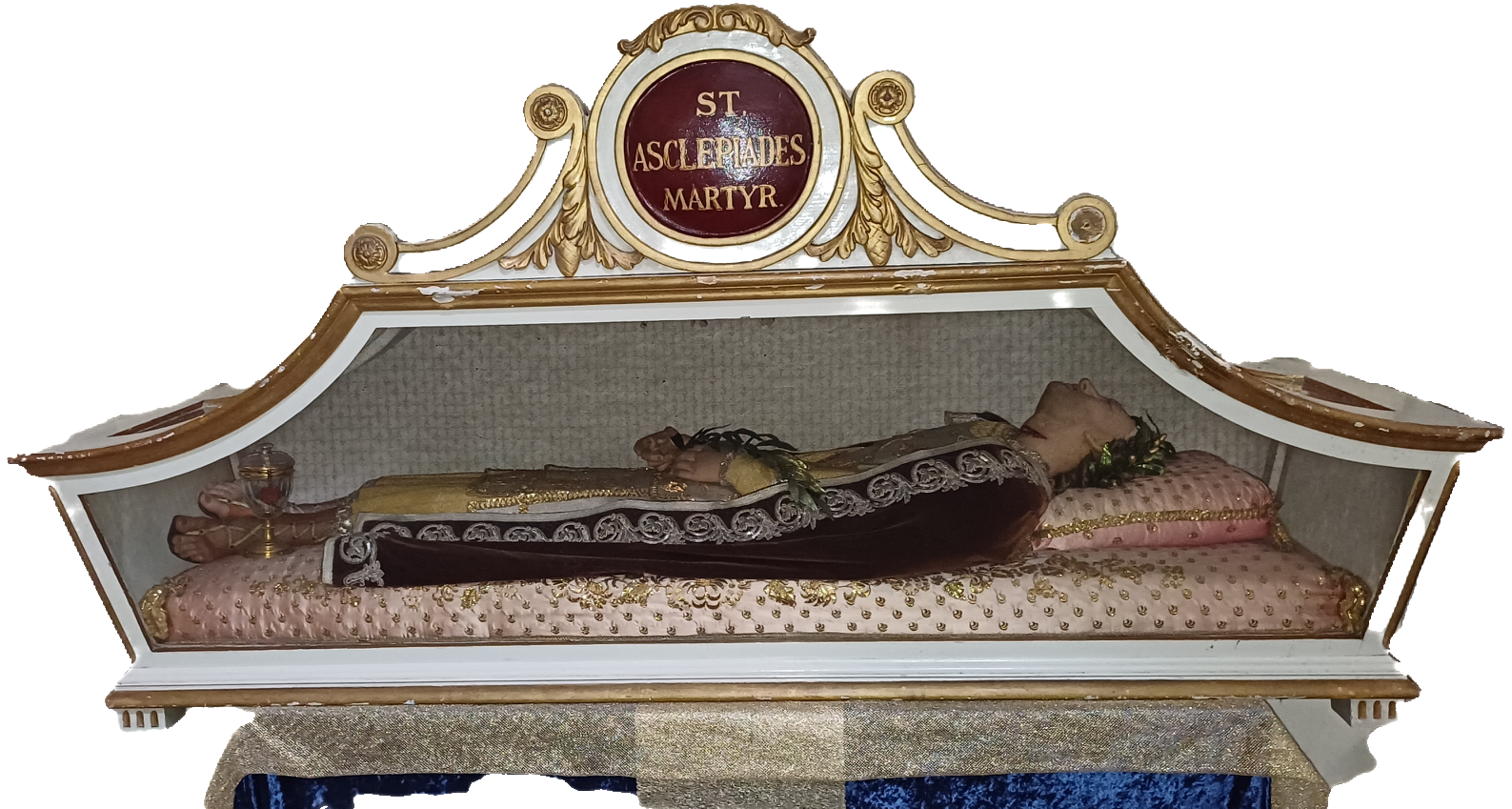
Full-Body Relic in Vienna

Asclepiades of Antioch (Greek: Ἀσκληπιάδης, also: Aslipiades or Askelpiades - † c. 218) called the Confessor, was Patriarch of Antioch from 211 until his death. He succeeded Serapion as Patriarch of Antioch in 211. He was given the title of martyr, due to the trials he endured during Roman persecution.

Eusebius of Caesarea states that his term of office began in the first year of Roman emperor Caracalla's reign so that 212 is usually given as the year in which Asclepiades took office. Harnack, referring to another source, suspects a somewhat earlier start. In addition to the year 218, the year of his death is also given as 220. Asclepiades took office from his predecessor Serapion. His successor was Philetus.

A full-body relic of Asclepiades is kept in Austria, in the Church of the Redemeer, Vienna

His memorial day in the Roman Catholic Church is kept on 18 October.

== See also ==
- Paul of Samosata

== Notes and references ==
Titles of the Great Christian Church
Preceded by Serapion	Patriarch of Antioch; 211 – 218	Succeeded by Philetus
