= Theodotus of Antioch =

Patriarch of Antioch from 417 to 428

- Patriarch of Antioch
- Installed: 417
- Term ended: 428
- Predecessor: Alexander of Antioch
- Successor: John I of Antioch

Personal details
- Died: 429
- Denomination: Early Christianity

Theodotus of Antioch, patriarch of Antioch (died 429), in 417 succeeded Alexander of Antioch, under whom the long-standing schism of Meletius at Antioch had been healed, and followed his lead in replacing the honoured name of John Chrysostom on the diptychs of the church.

He is described by Theodoret, at one time one of his presbyters, as "the pearl of temperance", "adorned with a splendid life and a knowledge of the divine dogmas". John Moschus relates anecdotes illustrative of his meekness when treated rudely by his clergy, and his kindness on a journey in insisting on one of his presbyters exchanging his horse for the patriarch's litter. By his gentleness he brought back the Apollinarians to the church without rigidly insisting on their formal renouncement of their errors. On the real character of Pelagius's teaching becoming known in the East and the consequent withdrawal of the testimony previously given by the synods of Jerusalem and Caesarea to his orthodoxy, Theodotus presided at the final synod held at Antioch (mentioned only by Marius Mercator and Photius I of Constantinople, in whose text Theophilus I of Alexandria has by an evident error taken Theodotus' place) at which Pelagius was condemned and expelled from Jerusalem and the other holy sites, and he joined with Praulius of Jerusalem in the synodical letters to Rome, stating what had been done. The most probable date of this synod is that given by Karl Josef von Hefele: 424.

When in 424 Alexander, founder of the order of the Acoemetae, visited Antioch, Theodotus refused to receive him as being suspected of heretical views. His feeling was not shared by the Antiochenes, who, ever eager after novelty, deserted their own churches and crowded to listen to Alexander's fervid eloquence. Theodotus took part in the ordination of Sisinnius I of Constantinople as patriarch of Constantinople, in February 426, and united in the synodical letter addressed by the bishops then assembled to the bishops of Pamphylia against the Massalian heresy. He died in 429.

== Notes and references ==
=== Attribution ===
- This article contains text from Henry Wace and William C. Piercy's Dictionary of Christian Biography and Literature to the End of the Sixth Century A.D., with an Account of the Principal Sects and Heresies. This work (published in 1911) is now in the public domain.

Titles of the Meletian group of Early Christianity
Preceded by Alexander	Patriarch of Antioch; 417 – 428	Succeeded by John I
