= Stephen I =

Stephen I may refer to:

- Pope Stephen I, Bishop of Rome from 254 to 257
- Stephen I of Antioch, Patriarch of Antioch from 342 to 344
- Stephen I of Iberia (died 627), of the Guaramid Dynasty, presiding prince of Iberia from c. 590 to 627
- Ecumenical Patriarch Stephen I of Constantinople (867–893), Patriarch of Constantinople
- Stephen I, Count of Troyes (died 1020), seventh Count of Meaux
- Stephen I of Hungary (967/969/975 – 1038), Grand Prince of the Hungarians and first King of Hungary
- Stephen I of Croatia (ruled 1030–1058)
- Stephan I, Count of Sponheim (d. ca. 1080)
- Stephen I, Count of Burgundy (1065–1102), Count Palatine of Burgundy, Count of Burgundy and Count of Mâcon and Vienne
- Stephen of England (c. 1096 – 1154) may be referred to as Stephen I
- Stephen I of Sancerre (1133–1190), Count of Sancerre and son of Count Theobald II of Champagne
- Stefan Nemanja (1109–1199), Medieval Serb nobleman, Grand Prince of the medieval Serb state of Rascia
- Stephen I, Duke of Bavaria (1271–1310), duke of Lower Bavaria as co-regent of his older brothers Otto III and Louis III
- Stephen I, Ban of Bosnia (1242–1314), Bosnian Ban
- Stephen I of Moldavia (r. 1394–1399)
- Stephen Báthory of Poland (1533–1586), Hungarian noble Prince of Transylvania, King consort of Poland and Grand Duke consort of Lithuania.
