= Zebinnus of Antioch =

3rd-century Patriarch of Antioch

- Patriarch of Antioch
- Church: Church of Antioch
- Installed: c. 231–237 or c. 232–240
- Predecessor: Philetus of Antioch
- Successor: Babylas of Antioch

Zebinnus of Antioch was the Patriarch of Antioch between 231 and 237 or 232 and 240 (depending on the source). According Eusebius of Caesarea, his bishopric coincided with the regence of Roman emperors Severus Alexander and Maximinus Thrax, Zebinnus was the successor of Philetus of Antioch on the Antioch see.

== Notes and references ==
Titles of the Great Christian Church
Preceded by Philetus	Patriarch of Antioch; 231–237 / 232–240	Succeeded by Babylas
