= Eros of Antioch =

Bishop and Patriarch of Antioch (c. 154-c. 169)

- Patriarch of Antioch
- Installed: c. 154
- Term ended: c. 169
- Predecessor: Cornelius of Antioch
- Successor: Theophilus of Antioch

Eros of Antioch was Bishop and Patriarch of Antioch from about 154 AD until c. 169 AD. Eusebius puts his reign from the fifth year of Antoninus Pius and his successor Theophilus of Antioch as dating from the ninth year of Marcus Aurelius. Jerome says his rule began in 142 AD though this is doubted.

We know nothing of his bishopric, though his was a time of great persecution of the church generally.

== Notes and references ==
Titles of the Great Christian Church
Preceded by Cornelius	Patriarch of Antioch c. 154 – c. 169	Succeeded by Theophilus
