= Patriarch Stephen I =

Patriarch Stephen I may refer to:

- Patriarch Stephen I of Antioch, ruled in 341–345 or in 342–344
- Stephen I of Constantinople, Ecumenical Patriarch of Constantinople in 886–893
