= Evodius =

Patriarch of Antioch from 53 to 66

Saint Evodius
- Bishop of Antioch
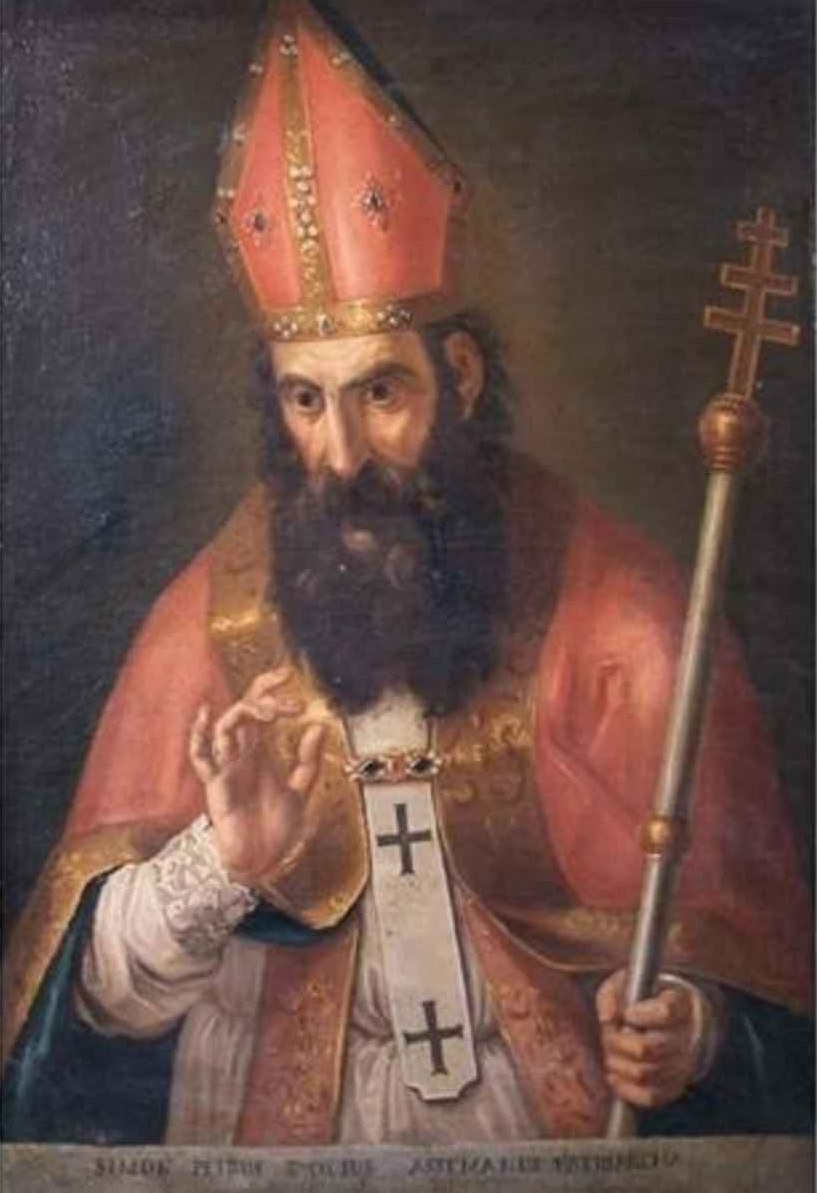
- Diocese: Antioch
- See: Antioch
- In office: c. 53-66 AD
- Predecessor: Peter I
- Successor: Ignatius of Antioch

Personal details
- Died: c. 66 AD (traditional) Antioch, Syria, Roman Empire

Sainthood
- Feast day: 6 May (Catholic Church); 7 September (Eastern Orthodox Church)
- Venerated in: Catholic Church; Eastern Orthodox Church; Oriental Orthodoxy; Assyrian Church of the East; Ancient Church of the East
- Attributes: Bishop

Evodius (Ancient Greek: Ευωδίας, Euōdias; fl. c. 50–70) was an early Christian identified by some Christian writings as the first bishop of Antioch. In some traditions, he is seen as succeeding Peter. He is regarded as one of the first identifiable post-apostolic Christians and is venerated as a saint.

== Biography ==
Little is known of the life of Evodius. In the first century (1–100 AD), Antioch was an opulent and cosmopolitan city, the former capital of the Seleucid Empire that had maintained its status as a trade center in the era of Roman Syria. It seems to have had a strong community of Hellenistic Jews, who spoke Greek and were among the earliest audience that Jewish Christians sought to spread their message to. However, no writings attributed to Evodius are extant; if he wrote anything, it was lost and not preserved.

The main surviving writings about Evodius are from centuries later, where he is often reduced to a simple name on a page as the first bishop of Antioch. Various early Christian writings indicate Peter visited Antioch, and some indicate he may have served as leader of the Antiochene Christians, although others do not, and others are unclear. This is complicated because some ancient authors distinguished apostles from bishops, where the apostles (such as Peter) could create bishops but were not bishops themselves in this view. Eusebius's fourth-century book Church History includes a brief remark that "of those in Antioch, Evodius was appointed first" and Ignatius "second". The Apostolic Constitutions claims to be written by the apostles collectively, although it is pseudepigrapha by an unknown fourth-century author. Still, it is useful as a guide to fourth-century Syrian Christian traditions; it includes a list "concerning the bishops ordained by us in our lifetime". The list then includes "And of Antioch, Evodius, by me, Peter, and Ignatius by Paul". The ninth-century Chronography of George Syncellus indicates that "Euodius" was the first Antiochene bishop and that this was around Claudius's fourth year as emperor (c. 45 AD).

A few scholars such as Walter Bauer have argued that Evodius was not even Bishop of Antioch and that some ancient lines should be interpreted as claiming that Peter himself was the first Bishop with none between him and Ignatius. A homily by John Chrysostom praises Ignatius as the successor to Peter, for example, seemingly ignoring Evodius. A short line in Eusebius on Ignatius describes him as "second to be allotted the episcopacy of the succession of Peter in Antioch". While usually interpreted as the author excluding Peter from the episcopacy yet designating its line, Bauer prefers a reading where it is read as Ignatius directly succeeding Peter.

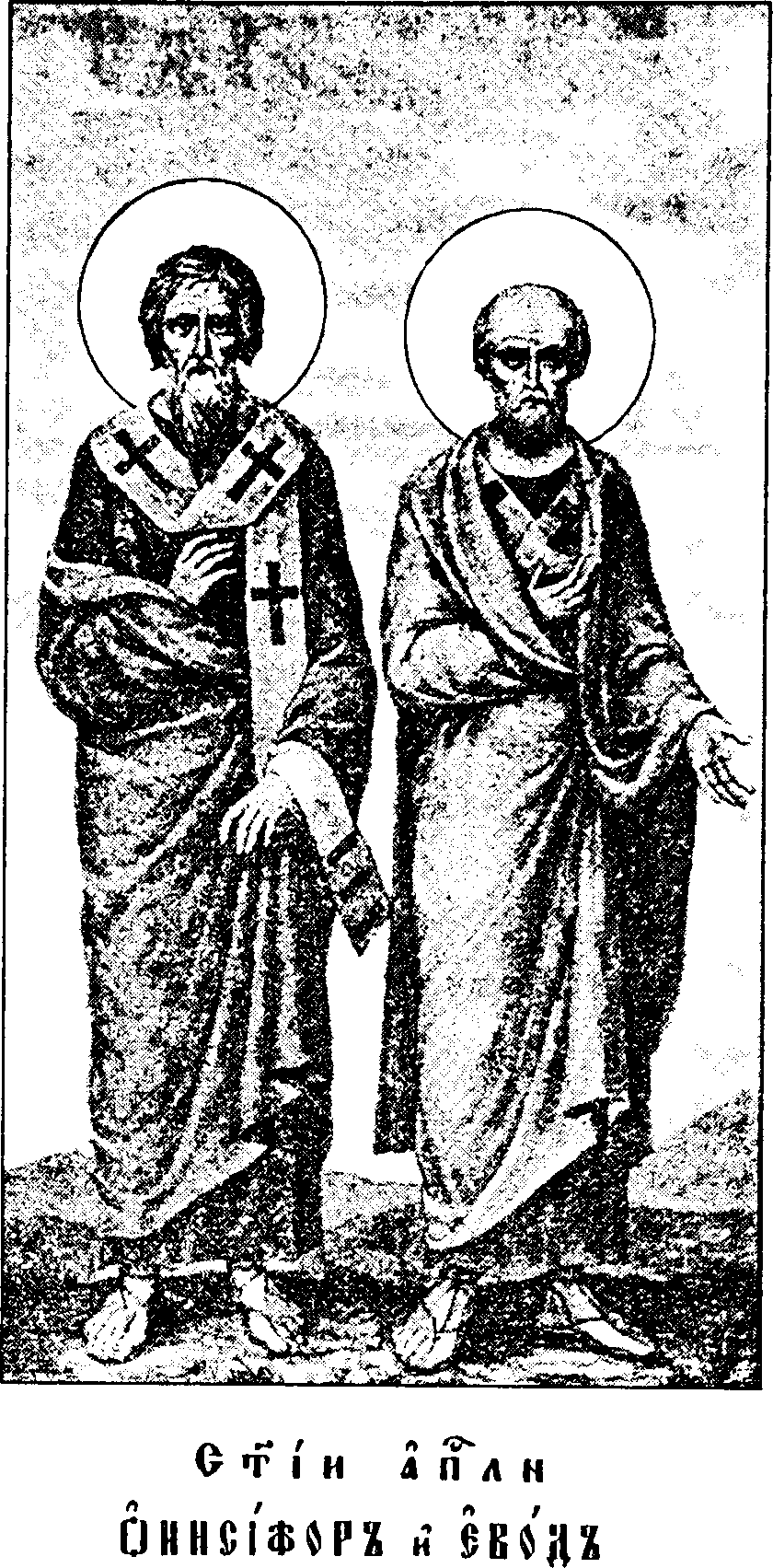
Russian Lives of the Saints illustration with Onesiphorus and Evodius

As Christianity became more popular in later centuries, there was a certain pious curiosity for more details on the Apostolic Age which began appearing in writings. In these later writings, Evodius is sometimes depicted as one of the seventy disciples of Christ (or 72 disciples). Peter's stay in Antioch and role in its church was expanded, with Evodius his chosen successor when Peter departed for Rome. The date of the end of his episcopacy is usually given as 66 AD when he was succeeded by Ignatius of Antioch. There are differing traditions on his death; Catholic tradition says it is likely that Evodius died of natural causes, while Eastern Orthodox tradition holds that he was martyred under Emperor Nero.

== Pseudo-Evodius ==
There are three apocryphal works written in the Coptic language, probably by the same author, that are pseudepigraphically attributed to Evodius's authorship. The texts identify him as being in Rome (rather than Antioch), which is not found elsewhere, but seem to be referring to the same person, given that they call him the successor of Peter. They were probably created somewhere between the 6th and 8th centuries. These include Homily on the Dormition of the Virgin, Homily on the Passion and Resurrection, and Homily on the Life of Jesus and His Love for the Apostles.

== Notes and references ==
Titles of the Great Christian Church
Preceded by Peter I	Bishop of Antioch; 53–68	Succeeded by Ignatius I
