= Serapion of Antioch =

Patriarch of Antioch from 191 to 211

Saint Serapion of Antioch
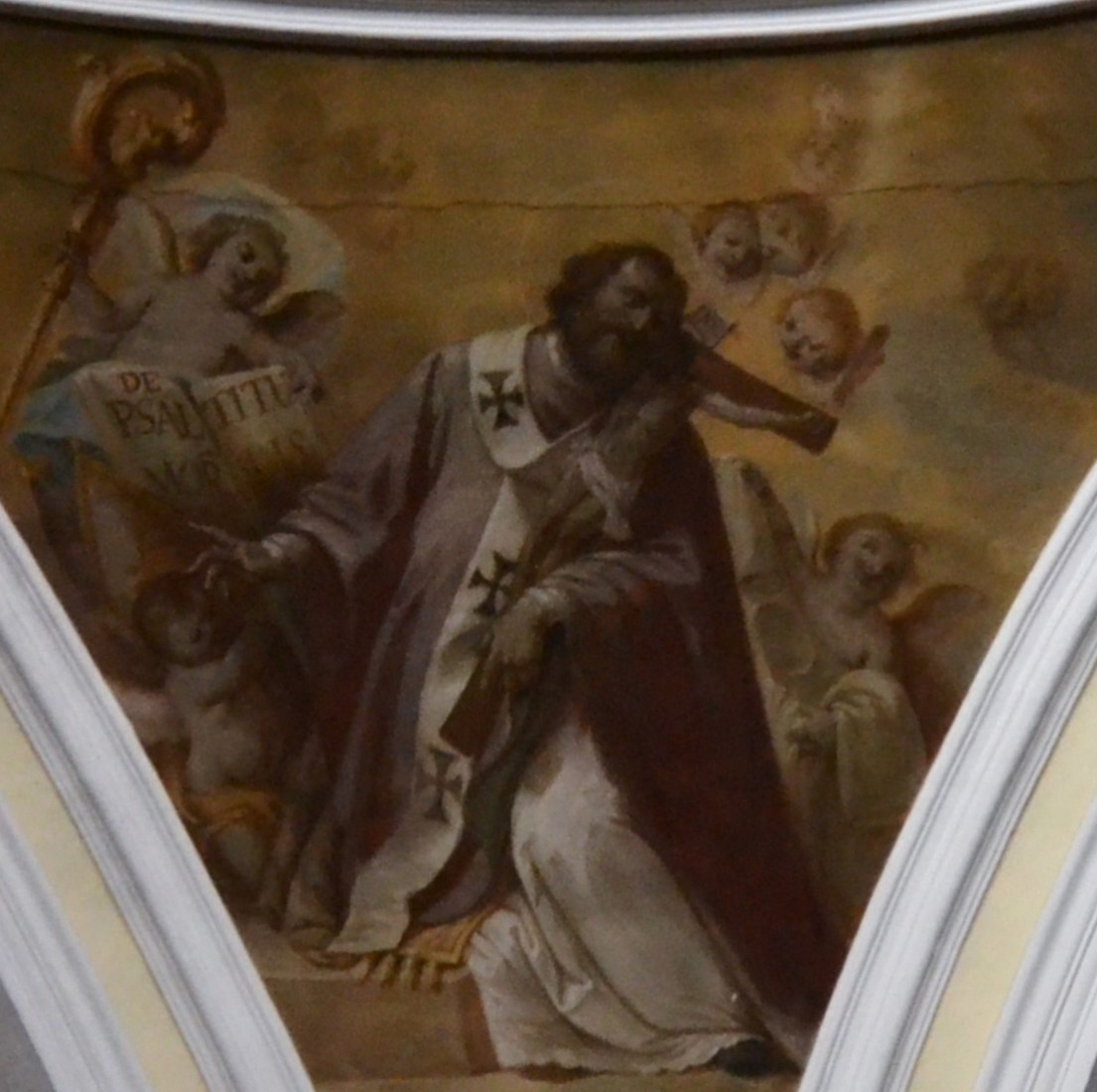
- Serapion of Antioch in the Església de Sant Antoni Abat (València)

Patriarch of Antioch
- Died: 211
- Venerated in: Catholic Church; Eastern Orthodox Church; Oriental Orthodoxy
- Canonized: Pre-congregation
- Feast: 30 October

Serapion of Antioch was a Patriarch of Antioch (Greek: Σεραπίων; 191–211). He is known primarily through his theological writings, although all but a few fragments of his works have perished. His feast day is celebrated on 30 October.

== Biography ==
Serapion was considered one of the chief theologians of his era.

Eusebius refers to three works of Serapion in his history, but admits that others probably existed:

- First is a private letter addressed to Caricus and Pontius against Montanism, from which Eusebius quotes an extract (Historia ecclesiastica V, 19), as well as ascriptions showing that it was circulated amongst bishops in Asia and Thrace.
- Next is a work addressed to a certain Domninus, who in time of persecution abandoned Christianity for the error of "Jewish will-worship" (Hist. Eccles, VI, 12).
- Lastly, Eusebius quotes (vi.12.2) from a pamphlet Serapion wrote concerning the Docetic Gospel of Peter, in which Serapion presents an argument to the Christian community of Rhossus in Syria against this gospel and condemns it. He recalls the permission to read this apocryphal work given in ignorance of its true character and expresses his intention of visiting the church to strengthen them in the true faith.

Eusebius also alludes to a number of personal letters Serapion wrote to Pontius, Caricus, and others about this Gospel of Peter.

Serapion also acted (Pantaenus supported him) against the influence of Gnosticism in Osroene by consecrating Mari of Edessa as bishop of Edessa, where Mari addressed the increasingly Gnostic tendencies that the churchman Bardesanes was introducing to its Christian community. He ordained Pantaenus as a priest or bishop in Edessa.

Serapion was succeeded as bishop of Antioch by Asclepiades (Eusebius Historia ecclesiastica VI, 11, 4).

== Notes and references ==
Titles of the Great Christian Church
Preceded by Maximus I	Patriarch of Antioch; 191 – 211	Succeeded by Asclepiades
