= Flavian I of Antioch =

Patriarch of Antioch from 381 to 404

- Patriarch of Antioch
- Installed: 381
- Term ended: 404
- Predecessor: Meletius of Antioch
- Successor: Porphyrus of Antioch

Personal details
- Born: c. 320 Antioch
- Died: February 404
- Denomination: Early Christianity

Flavian I of Antioch (Latin: Flavianus I, Greek: Φλαβιανός Α'; c. 320 – February 404) was a Patriarch of Antioch from 381 until his death.

He was born about 320, most probably in Antioch. He inherited great wealth but resolved to devote his riches and his talents to the service of the church. In association with Diodore, afterwards bishop of Tarsus, he supported the orthodox Faith against the Arian heretic Leontius of Antioch, who had succeeded Eustathius of Antioch as Patriarch of Antioch. The two friends assembled their adherents outside the city walls for religious services (according to Theodoret, it was in these meetings that the practice of antiphonal singing was first introduced in the services of the church).

When Meletius of Antioch was appointed patriarch of Antioch in 360 he ordained Flavian to the priesthood, and on the death of Meletius in 381 Flavian was chosen to succeed him. The schism between the two parties was, however, far from being healed. The Bishop of Rome and the Patriarch of Alexandria refused to acknowledge Flavian I, and Paulinus II of Antioch, who by the extreme Eustathians had been elected patriarch in opposition to Meletius, continued to exercise authority over a portion of the church.

On the death of Paulinus II in 388, Evagrius was chosen as his successor. After the death of Evagrius, (c. 392) Flavian succeeded in preventing the election of a successor, though the Eustathians still continued to hold separate meetings. Through the intervention of John Chrysostom soon after his elevation to the patriarchate of Constantinople in 398, and the influence of the emperor Theodosius I, Flavian I was acknowledged in 399 as the sole legitimate patriarch of Antioch.

Nevertheless, the Eustathian schism was not finally healed until 415 due to the reconciliation efforts of Alexander of Antioch (appointed patriarch in 414), successor to Porphyrus of Antioch. Flavian is posthumously venerated in both the Western and Eastern churches as a Saint.

== Veneration ==
=== Eastern Orthodoxy ===
The Eastern Orthodox Church venerates Flavian on February 16 and on September 27.

== See also ==
- Flavian II of Antioch
- Other Flavians and Flaviani

== Notes and references ==
Titles of the Meletian group of Early Christianity
| Preceded by Meletius | Patriarch of Antioch; 381–404 | Succeeded by Porphyrus |
