= Paulinus II =

Paulinus II may refer to:

- Paulinus II of Antioch
- Paulinus II of Aquileia
