= Cornelius of Antioch =

Patriarch of Antioch from c. 127 to c. 151

- Patriarch of Antioch
- Installed: c. 127
- Term ended: c. 151
- Predecessor: Herodion of Antioch
- Successor: Eros of Antioch

Cornelius of Antioch (also romanised as Korneilos) was the bishop of Antioch between 127 and 151 AD or 154 AD, successor of Herodion of Antioch as bishop according to Eusebius of Caesarea. He was the first Christian leader with an aristocratic Roman name. Little is known about his deeds and life.

== Notes and references ==
Titles of the Great Christian Church
| Preceded by Herodion | Patriarch of Antioch c. 127 – c. 151 (154) | Succeeded by Eros |
