= Theophilus of Antioch =

Patriarch of Antioch from c. 169 to c. 183

Saint Theophilus of Antioch
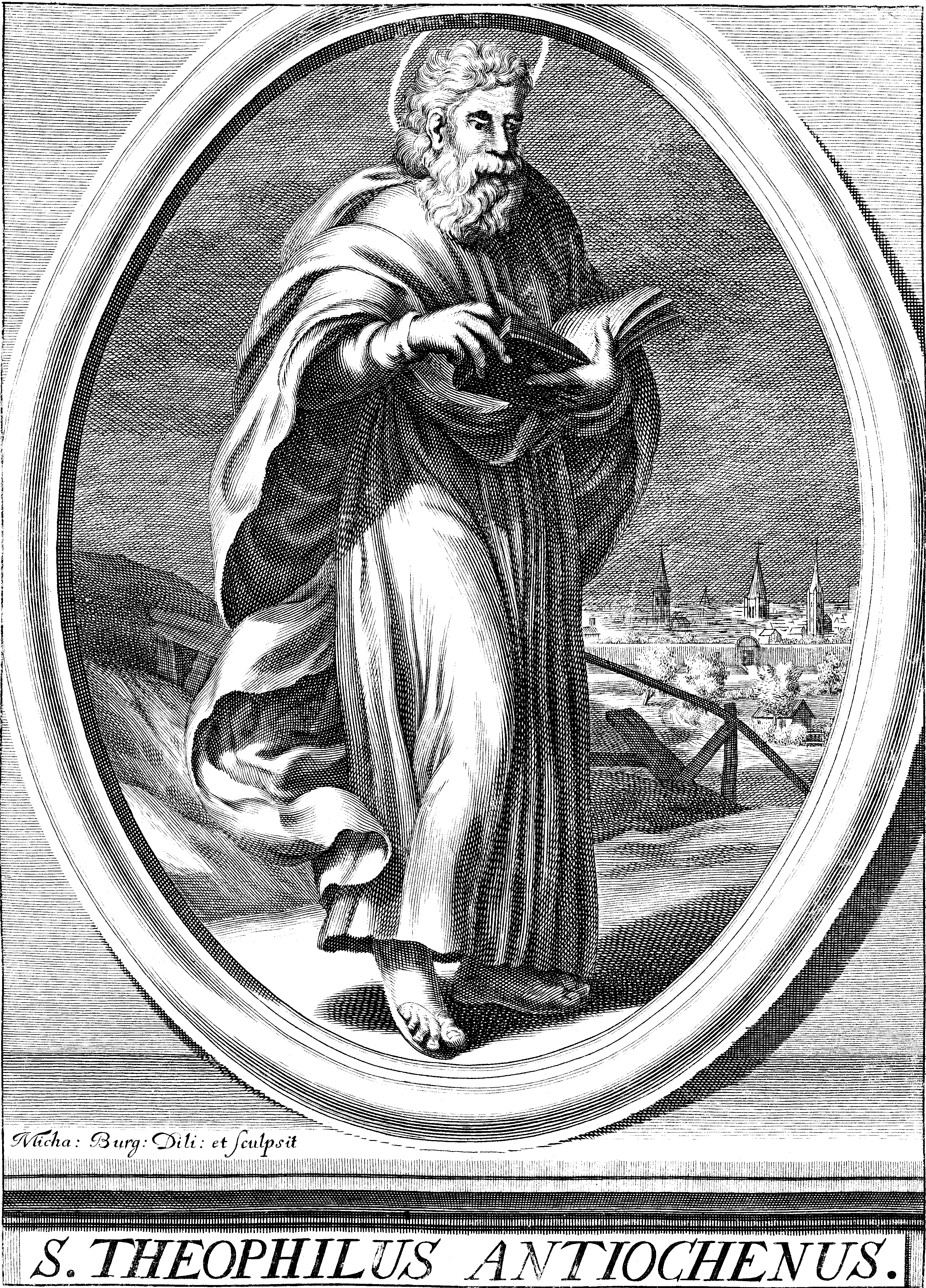

Patriarch of Antioch
- Died: 18 October 183
- Venerated in: Catholic Church; Eastern Orthodox Church; Oriental Orthodoxy
- Canonized: Pre-congregation
- Feast: 13 October
- Patronage: Antioch, Turkey; Arequipa, Peru; Belgrade, Serbia; Managua, Nicaragua; Tegucigalpa, Honduras

There is also a Theophilus of Alexandria (c. 412)

Theophilus of Antioch (Greek: Θεόφιλος ὁ Ἀντιοχεύς) was Patriarch of Antioch from 169 until 183. He succeeded Eros of Antioch c. 169, and was succeeded by Maximus I c. 183, according to Henry Fynes Clinton, but these dates are only approximations. His death probably occurred between 183 and 185.

His writings (the only surviving one being his apology to Autolycus) indicate that he was born a pagan, not far from the Tigris and Euphrates, and was led to embrace Christianity by studying the Holy Scriptures, especially the prophetical books. He makes no reference to his office in his surviving writings, nor is any other fact in his life recorded. Eusebius, however, speaks of the zeal which he and the other chief shepherds displayed in driving away the heretics who were attacking Christ's flock, with special mention of his work against Marcion. He made contributions to the departments of Christian literature, polemics, exegetics, and apologetics. William Sanday describes him as "one of the precursors of that group of writers who, from Irenaeus to Cyprian, not only break the obscurity which rests on the earliest history of the Church, but alike in the East and in the West carry it to the front in literary eminence, and distance all their heathen contemporaries".

== Works ==
Eusebius and Jerome mention numerous works of Theophilus existing in their time. They are:

1. the existing Apologia addressed to Autolycus;
2. a work against the heresy of Hermogenes;
3. against that of Marcion;
4. some catechetical writings;
5. Jerome also mentions having read some commentaries on the gospel and on Proverbs, which bore Theophilus's name, but which he regarded as inconsistent with the elegance and style of his other works.

== The Apology to Autolycus ==
The one undoubted extant work of Theophilus, the 7th Bishop of Antioch (c. 169 – c. 183), is his Apology to Autolycus (Apologia ad Autolycum), a series of books defending Christianity written to a pagan friend.

The ostensible object of Ad Autolycum is to convince a pagan friend, Autolycus, a man of great learning and an earnest seeker after truth, of the divine authority of the Christian religion, while at the same time exhibiting the falsehood and absurdity of paganism. His arguments, drawn almost entirely from the Old Testament, with but very scanty references to the New Testament, are largely chronological. He makes the truth of Christianity depend on his demonstration that the books of the Old Testament were long anterior to the writings of the Greeks and were divinely inspired. Whatever truth the pagan authors contain he regards as borrowed from Moses and the prophets, who alone declare God's revelation to man. He contrasts the perfect consistency of the divine oracles, which he regards as a convincing proof of their inspiration, with the inconsistencies of the pagan philosophers. He contrasts the account of the creation of the universe and of man, on which, together with the history contained in the earlier chapters of Genesis, he comments at great length with the statements of Plato, "reputed the wisest of all the Greeks", of Aratus, who had the insight to assert that the earth was spherical, and other Greek writers on whom he pours contempt as mere ignorant retailers of stolen goods. He supplies a series of dates, beginning with Adam and ending with Marcus Aurelius, who had died shortly before he wrote, thus dating this work to the years of the reign of Commodus, 180–192.

Theophilus regards the Sibylline books that were still in Rome as authentic and inspired productions, quoting the Sibylline oracles (scholars dispute that these are the same) largely as declaring the same truths with the prophets. The omission by the Greeks of all mention of the Old Testament from which they draw all their wisdom is ascribed to a self-chosen blindness in refusing to recognize the only God and in persecuting the followers of the only fountain of truth. He can recognize in them no aspirations after the divine life, no earnest gropings after truth, no gleams of the all-illumining light. The pagan religion was a mere worship of idols, bearing the names of dead men. Almost the only point in which he will allow the pagan writers to be in harmony with revealed truth is in the doctrine of retribution and punishment after death for sins committed in life.

Theophilus's critical powers were not above his age. He adopts Herodotus's derivation of θεός (theòs) from τίθημι (tithemi), since God set all things in order, comparing with it that of Plato from θεεῖν (theein), because the Deity is ever in motion. He asserts that Satan is called the dragon (Greek δράκων, drakon) on account of his having revolted (ἀποδεδρακέναι, apodedrakenai) from God, and traces the Bacchanalian cry "Evoe" to the name of Eve as the first sinner. He discovers the reason of blood coagulating on the surface of the ground in the divine word to Cain, the earth struck with terror refusing to drink it in. In addition, Theophilus misquotes Plato several times, ranking Zopyrus among the Greeks, and speaking of Pausanias as having only run a risk of starvation instead of being actually starved to death in the temple of Minerva.

But if you say, "Show me thy God", I would reply, "Show me yourself, and I will show you my God". Show, then, that the eyes of your soul are capable of seeing, and the ears of your heart able to hear; for as those who look with the eyes of the body perceive earthly objects and what concerns this life, and discriminate at the same time between things that differ, whether light or darkness, white or black, deformed or beautiful, well-proportioned and symmetrical or disproportioned and awkward, or monstrous or mutilated; and as in like manner also, by the sense of hearing, we discriminate either sharp, or deep, or sweet sounds; so the same holds good regarding the eyes of the soul and the ears of the heart, that it is by them we are able to behold God. For God is seen by those who are enabled to see Him when they have the eyes of their soul opened: for all have eyes, but in some, they are overspread and do not see the light of the sun. Yet it does not follow, because the blind do not see, that the light of the sun does not shine; but let the blind blame themselves and their own eyes. So also you, O man, have the eyes of your soul overspread by your sins and evil deeds. You will say, then, to me, "Do you, who see God, explain to me the appearance of God." Hear, O man. The appearance of God is ineffable and indescribable, and cannot be seen by eyes of flesh. For in glory He is incomprehensible, in greatness unfathomable, in height inconceivable, in power incomparable, in wisdom unrivalled, in goodness inimitable, in kindness unutterable.

— Theophilus to Autolycus (Book I)

=== Trinity ===
Theophilus's apology is most notable for being the earliest extant Christian work to use the word "Trinity" (Greek: τριάς trias; English: three), although it does not use the common formula of "the Father, the Son, and the Holy Spirit" to describe the Trinity. Rather, Theophilus himself puts it as "God, his Word (Logos) and his Wisdom (Sophia)," perhaps following the early Christian practice of identifying the Holy Spirit as the Wisdom of God, as he seems to demonstrate in his interpretation of Psalm 33:6, and which is also expressed in the works his contemporary, Irenaeus of Lyon, who commenting on that selfsame verse writes:

"By the word of the Lord were the heavens established, and by his spirit all their power". Since then the Word establishes, that is to say, gives body and grants the reality of being, and the Spirit gives order and form to the diversity of the powers; rightly and fittingly is the Word called the Son, and the Spirit the Wisdom of God.

This practice served as a way to express Christian doctrine in a way that is more relatable to contemporary views Sophia to ideas found in Greek philosophy or Hellenistic Judaism in which such concepts as Nous (Mind), Logos (Word, Reason) and Sophia (Wisdom) were common. As the Patripassionist heresies arose, however, the formula of "Father, Son, Holy Spirit" became more prominently featured, as such beliefs denied the persons of the Economy (an earlier developed term for the Trinity). As Theophilus does not appear to be introducing the word Trinity in novel fashion, it is probable that the word was in use before this time. The context for his use of the word Trinity is commentary on the successive work of the creation weeks (Genesis chapters 1–3), where Theophilus expresses the Trinity as follows:

In like manner also the three days which were before the luminaries, are types of the Trinity, of God, and His Word, and His wisdom. And the fourth is the type of man, who needs light, that so there may be God, the Word, wisdom, man.

— Theophilus

The concept of intermediate divine beings was common to Platonism and certain Jewish sects. In Proverbs 8 Wisdom (as feminine consort) is described as God's Counsellor and Workmistress, who dwelt beside Him before the creation of the world.

=== References to the Old and New Testaments ===
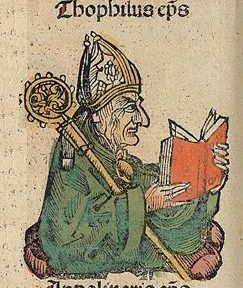
Depiction of Theophilus of Antioch from the Nuremberg Chronicle

The theology of Theophilus was rooted in Jewish ideas and the Hebrew scriptures. Theophilus's quotation from the Old Testament scripture is copious, drawing largely from the Pentateuch and to a smaller extent from the other historical books. His references to Psalms, Proverbs, Isaiah, and Jeremiah are also numerous, and he quotes from Ezekiel, Hosea and other minor prophets. His direct evidence respecting the canon of the New Testament does not go much beyond a few precepts from the Sermon on the Mount, a possible quotation from Luke 18:27, Theophilus seems to have known a collection of Pauline epistles which included at least Romans, I and II Corinthians, Ephesians, Philippians, Colossians and the three Pastoral Epistles. More important is a distinct citation from the opening of the Gospel of St. John (1:1-3), mentioning the evangelist by name, as one of the inspired men by whom the Holy Scriptures were written The use of a metaphor found in 2 Peter 1:19 bears on the date of that epistle. According to Eusebius, Theophilus quoted the Book of Revelation in his work against Hermogenes; a very precarious allusion has been seen in ii. 28, cf. Revelation 12:3, 7, etc. A full index of these and other possible references to the Old and New Testament is given by Otto.

Although Theophilus cites the opening of the Gospel of St. John (1:1), he does not go on to speak of the incarnation of the Word and his (Jesus's) atoning sacrificial death. While Theophilus makes no mention of the name of Jesus or use the word Christ or the phrase Son of God, he identifies the Logos as the Son of God in his second letter, when he writes,

For the divine writing itself teaches us that Adam said that he had heard the voice. But what else is this voice but the Word of God, who is also His Son? Not as the poets and writers of myths talk of the sons of gods begotten from intercourse [with women], but as truth expounds, the Word, that always exists, residing within the heart of God. For before anything came into being He had Him as a counsellor, being His own mind and thought. But when God wished to make all that He determined on, He begot this Word, uttered, the first-born of all creation, not Himself being emptied of the Word [Reason], but having begotten Reason, and always conversing with His Reason. And hence the holy writings teach us, and all the spirit-bearing [inspired] men, one of whom, John, says, "In the beginning was the Word, and the Word was with God," showing that at first God was alone, and the Word in Him. Then he says, "The Word was God; all things came into existence through Him; and apart from Him not one thing came into existence." The Word, then, being God, and being naturally produced from God, whenever the Father of the universe wills, He sends Him to any place; and He, coming, is both heard and seen, being sent by Him and is found in a place.

=== Meaning of term Christian ===
Theophilus explains the meaning of the term Christian as follows:

And about your laughing at me and calling me Christian, you know not what you are saying. First, because that which is anointed is sweet and serviceable, and far from contemptible. For what ship can be serviceable and seaworthy, unless it be first anointed? Or what castle or house is beautiful and serviceable when it has not been anointed? And what man, when he enters into this life or into the gymnasium, is not anointed with oil? And what work has either ornament or beauty unless it be anointed and burnished? Then the air and all that is under heaven is in a certain sort anointed by light and spirit; and are you unwilling to be anointed with the oil of God? Wherefore we are called Christians on this account because we are anointed with the oil of God.

— Theophilus

=== Chronology ===
In his third book Theophilus presents a detailed chronology "from the foundation of the world" to emperor Marcus Aurelius. This begins with the Biblical first man Adam through to emperor Marcus Aurelius. Theophilus lived in the reign of this emperor. The chronology puts the creation of the world at about 5529 BC: "All the years from the creation of the world amount to a total of 5,698 years". He uses this chronology to prove that Moses and the other Hebrew prophets preceded the philosophers. The leading chronological epochs correspond to the Old Testament prophets.

=== Patristic citations ===
The silence regarding his Apology in the East is remarkable; we fail to find the work mentioned or quoted by Greek writers before the time of Eusebius. Several passages in the works of Irenaeus show an undoubted relationship to passages in one small section of the Apologia, but Harnack thinks it probable that the quotations, limited to two chapters, are not taken from the Apologia, but from Theophilus's work against Marcion In the West there are a few references to the Autolycus. It is quoted by Lactantius under the title Liber de Temporibus ad Autolycum. There is a passage first cited by Maranus in Novatian which shows great similarity to the language of Theophilus. In the next century the book is mentioned by Gennadius of Marseilles as "tres libelli de fide". He found them attributed to Theophilus of Alexandria, but the disparity of style caused him to question the authorship.

== Editions ==
Jacques Paul Migne's Patrologia Graeca, and a small edition (Cambridge 1852) by W. G. Humphry. Johann Carl Theodor von Otto's edition in the Corpus apologetarum christianorum saeculi secundi vol. ii. (Jena, 1861) is by far the most complete and useful. English translations by Joseph Betty (Oxford 1722), W. B. Flower (London, 1860), Marcus Dods (Clark's Ante-Nicene Library), and Robert M. Grant (with the Greek text; Clarendon Press, 1970).

This article uses text from A Dictionary of Christian Biography and Literature to the End of the Sixth Century A.D., with an Account of the Principal Sects and Heresies by Henry Wace.

== Notes and references ==
Titles of the Great Christian Church
Preceded by Eros	Patriarch of Antioch c. 169 – c. 183	Succeeded by Maximus I
