= Tyrannion of Antioch =

Patriarch of Antioch from 304 to 314

- Patriarch of Antioch
- Church: Church of Antioch
- Installed: 304 – 314
- Predecessor: Cyril I of Antioch
- Successor: Vitalius I of Antioch

Tyrannion of Antioch (or Tyrannos) (d. around 308) was Patriarch of Antioch as the successor of Cyril I.

Tyrannion's name comes from his origin in the city of Tyre. He was bishop at the beginning of the fourth century, but otherwise very little is known about him. Even the dates of his tenure are uncertain: according to some sources, he served in the years 299–308, and according to others in the years 304–314.

== Bibliography ==
- Eusebius of Caesarea: Historia ecclesiastica, VII, 32.

Titles of the Great Christian Church
Preceded by Cyril I	Patriarch of Antioch; 304 – 314	Succeeded by Vitalius I
