= Domnus II of Antioch =

Patriarch of Antioch from 441 to 449

- Patriarch of Antioch
- Church: Church of Antioch
- See: Antioch
- Installed: 441
- Term ended: 449
- Predecessor: John I of Antioch
- Successor: Maximus II of Antioch

Domnus II of Antioch was the Patriarch of Antioch (441 – 449), nephew of John I of Antioch, and friend of the influential Theodoret of Cyrrhus.

== Biography ==
In 429, Domnus was ordained a deacon by Patriarch Juvenal of Jerusalem. At the time, Domnus was a monk at the Monastery of St. Euthymius in Palestine, which fell under the ecclesiastical jurisdiction of the See of Jerusalem. He left the monastery in 431 to help his uncle, Patriarch John I of Antioch, during the controversy surrounding the First Council of Ephesus. In Antioch, Domnus supported the dyophysite Christology of the Antiochene school, which was being challenged by the rival faction led by Patriarch Cyril of Alexandria.

Following his uncle's death, Domnus was chosen as his successor in 441. In 445, he presided over a synod of Syrian bishops that confirmed the deposition of Athanasius of Perrha. In 447, Domnus consecrated Irenaeus as bishop of Tyre, but Emperor Theodosius II commanded the annulment of the appointment. The emperor cited two reasons: that Irenaeus was a digamus (a man who had been married twice, which was a canonical impediment to ordination as a bishop) and that he supported the Antiochene theology, which opponents labeled as Nestorianism. In 448, Domnus convened another synod in Antioch to defend Ibas, bishop of Edessa, against similar charges. This synod exonerated Ibas and deposed his accusers. Although Patriarch Flavian of Constantinople attempted to revoke this decision, an episcopal commission appointed by Emperor Theodosius II ultimately upheld the Antiochene synod's ruling.

These actions positioned Domnus as a leading opponent of the Alexandrian theological school. Consequently, at the Second Council of Ephesus on 8 August 449, he was deposed. At the council, which was controlled by his rival Patriarch Dioscorus I of Alexandria, Domnus reversed his previous opposition to the teachings of Eutyches and voted for the deposition of his former ally, Flavian. These concessions failed to prevent his own removal from office.

Domnus was the only bishop deposed at the Second Council of Ephesus who was not reinstated by the subsequent Council of Chalcedon in 451. It is conjectured that he may have requested to remain in retirement. At the council, his successor, Maximus II, received permission to grant Domnus a pension from the church's revenues. Recalled from exile, Domnus returned to the Monastery of St. Euthymius. According to the chronicler Theophanes the Confessor, in a notable turn of events in 452, Domnus gave refuge at the monastery to Patriarch Juvenal of Jerusalem, the same man who had ordained him, after Juvenal was temporarily driven from his see.

== Bibliography ==
- Meyendorff, John (1989). Imperial unity and Christian divisions - The Church 450-680 A.D. The Church in history. Vol. 2. Crestwood, NY: St. Vladimir's Seminary Press. ISBN 9780881410563.
- A Dictionary of Christian Biography and Literature to the End of the Sixth Century A.D., with an Account of the Principal Sects and Heresies by Henry Wace.

Titles of the Great Christian Church
Preceded by John I	Patriarch of Antioch; 441 – 449	Succeeded by Maximus II
