= Calendion =

Patriarch of Antioch from 479 to 485

Calendion of Antioch
- Patriarch of Antioch
- Church: Church of Antioch
- See: Antioch
- Installed: 479
- Term ended: 485
- Predecessor: Stephen II of Antioch
- Successor: Peter II of Antioch

Personal details
- Denomination: Chalcedonian Christianity

Calendion of Antioch (also, Calandion or Callandion) was the Patriarch of Antioch between 479 and 485.

== Biography ==
Calendion supported the results of the Council of Chalcedon but refused to accept the Henotikon of 482, through which the Roman Emperor, Zeno, attempted to reconcile the pro- and anti-Chalcedonian sides. This was because Calendion regarded it as a covert attempt to overturn the council's holdings.

Calendion supported the rebellion of Illus in 484, and as a result was deposed and banished by Zeno shortly thereafter, being replaced as Patriarch by Peter II of Antioch.

== Bibliography ==
- Meyendorff, John (1989). Imperial unity and Christian divisions - The Church 450-680 A.D. The Church in history. Vol. 2. Crestwood, NY: St. Vladimir's Seminary Press. ISBN 9780881410563.
- Jan-Eric Steppa (2002). John Rufus and the World Vision of Anti-Chalcedonian Culture. Gorgias Press. p. 51. ISBN 1-931956-09-X.

Titles of Chalcedonian Christianity
Preceded by Stephen II	Patriarch of Antioch; 479 – 485	Succeeded by Peter II
