= Maximus II of Antioch =

Patriarch of Antioch from 450 to 455

- Patriarch of Antioch
- Church: Church of Antioch
- Installed: 450
- Term ended: 455
- Predecessor: Domnus II of Antioch
- Successor: Basil of Antioch

Personal details
- Denomination: Chalcedonian Christianity

Maximus II of Antioch was a Patriarch of Antioch. After the deposition of Domnus II of Antioch by the Second Council of Ephesus, in 449, Dioscorus I of Alexandria persuaded the emperor Theodosius II to fill the vacancy with one of the clergy of Constantinople. Maximus was selected and ordained, in violation of canon law, by Patriarch Anatolius of Constantinople, without the official sanction of the clergy or people of Antioch.

Maximus II, though his elevation was under questionable conditions, gained a positive reputation in the conduct of his diocese and province. He dispatched epistolae tractoriae through the churches subject to him as metropolitan, requiring the signatures of the bishops to Pope Leo I's famous Leo's Tome and to another document condemning both Nestorius and Eutyches.

Having thus discreetly assured his position, he was summoned to the Council of Chalcedon in October 451 and took his seat without question, and when the acts of the Second Council of Ephesus were quashed, including the deposition of the other prelates, a special exception was made of the substitution of Maximus II for Domnus II on the express ground that Leo I had opened communion with him and recognized his episcopate (Philippe Labbe, Concilia, iv. 682).

His most important controversy at Chalcedon was with Juvenal of Jerusalem regarding the limits of their respective patriarchates. It was long and bitter; at last a compromise was accepted by the council, that Antioch should minister to the provinces of the two Phoenicias and Arabia and that the three provinces of Palestine should fall under the Patriarch of Jerusalem.

Maximus II next appears in a letter, dated 11 June 453, from Leo the Great, to whom he had appealed in defence of the prerogatives of his see. Leo I promised to help him against either Jerusalem or Constantinople, exhorting him to assert his privileges as bishop of the third see in Christendom (i.e. only inferior to Alexandria and Rome). Maximus II's zeal for the orthodox faith receives warm commendation from Leo I, who exhorts him as consors apostolicae sedis to maintain the doctrine founded by St. Peter speciali magisterio in the cities of Antioch and Rome, against the erroneous teaching both of Nestorius and Eutyches and to watch over the churches of the East generally and keep Leo informed about events. Leo I closes his letter with a desire that Maximus will restrain unordained persons, whether monks or laity, from public preaching and teaching.

Two years later, in 455, the episcopate of Maximus II came to a disastrous close by his deposition. The nature of his offence is nowhere specified. We do not know how much longer he lived or what became of him.

== Bibliography ==
- Meyendorff, John (1989). Imperial unity and Christian divisions - The Church 450-680 A.D. The Church in history. Vol. 2. Crestwood, NY: St. Vladimir's Seminary Press. ISBN 9780881410563.
- This article uses text from A Dictionary of Christian Biography and Literature to the End of the Sixth Century A.D., with an Account of the Principal Sects and Heresies by Henry Wace.

Titles of Chalcedonian Christianity
Preceded by Domnus II	Patriarch of Antioch; 450 – 455	Succeeded by Basil
