= Philogonius =

Patriarch of Antioch from 318 to 322

Saint Philogonius of Antioch
- Patriarch of Antioch
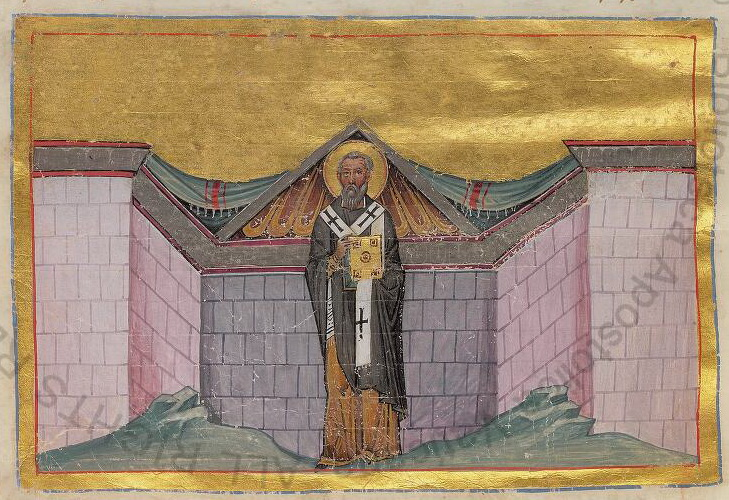
- Diocese: Antioch
- In office: 318 – 322
- Predecessor: Vitalius I of Antioch
- Successor: Eustathius of Antioch

Personal details
- Died: 322 Antioch

Sainthood
- Feast day: 20 December

Philogonius (or Filogonius, Philogonus, Philogonios, Greek: Φιλογόνιος; died 322) was a lawyer and an early Bishop of Antioch who came to be considered a saint. He opposed Arianism (Note: Arianism holds that the Christ the Son did not always exist but was begotten within time by God the Father. He is therefore distinct from the Father and subordinate to Him) when that heresy emerged in Alexandria, Egypt. His feast day is 20 December.

== Outline ==
Philogonius was a successful advocate at the bar of Antioch. He was known for his eloquence, moral integrity and Christian faith. He married and had a daughter, but became a monk and ascetic after his wife died. In 318 when Vitalius I died Philogonius was made Bishop of Antioch without first becoming a priest. When Arius (256–336) began to preach his heresy at Alexandria in 318, Pope Alexander I of Alexandria sent a synodal letter condemning him to Philogonius, who defended the orthodox faith against the heresy. (Note: Alban Butler wrote that after receiving Alexander I's letter Philogonius "defended the Catholic faith before the assembly of the council of Nicaea". However, the First Council of Nicaea convened in 325, after his death, so he could not have spoken at this council.) Philogonius lived through the attacks on the church by Roman emperors Maximinus Daza (r. 310–313) and Licinius (r. 308–324).

He died in 322.

== Monks of Ramsgate account ==
The monks of St Augustine's Abbey, Ramsgate, wrote in their Book of Saints (1921):

PHILOGONIUS (St.) Bp (20 December)
(4th cent.) The Bishop of Antioch who, with Saint Alexander of Alexandria, first detected and denounced the Arian heresy. He had, in the later years of the persecution under Licinius, suffered imprisonment for the Faith. He died in 323, and as early as 386 we find Saint John Chrysostom preaching the Panegyric of Saint Philogonius on the latter's Feast Day. The holy Doctor's Homily is still extant.

== Butler's account ==
The hagiographer Alban Butler (1710–1773) wrote in his Lives of the fathers, martyrs, and other principal saints,

St. Philogonius, C., Bishop of Antioch

Saint Philogonius was brought up to the law, and made a considerable figure at the bar, being admired for his eloquence, and still more for the purity of his manners and sanctity of his life. This was a sufficient motive for dispensing with the canons, which require some time spent among the clergy before a person be advanced to the highest station in the Church. Philogonius was placed in the see of Antioch, upon the death of Vitalius I in 318, and Saint Chrysostom mentions the flourishing state of that church in his time, as an authentic proof of his zeal and excellent administration. When Arius broached his blasphemies at Alexandria in 318, Saint Alexander condemned him and sent the sentence in a synodal letter to Saint Philogonius, who strenuously defended the catholic faith before the assembly of the council of Nicaea. In the storms which were raised against the Church, first by Maximinus Daza, and afterwards by Lucinius, Saint Philogonius deserved the title of Confessor; he died in the year 322, the fifth of his episcopal dignity. His festival was celebrated at Antioch on the 20th of December, in the year 386, in which Saint Chrysostom pronounced his panegyric, touching lightly on his virtues, because, as he says, he left the detail of them to his bishop, Flavian, who was to speak after him.

== Weninger's account ==
Francis Xavier Weninger (1805–1888) wrote in his Lives of the Saints (1876):

Eighteenth Day of December
St. Philiogonius, Bishop of Antioch...

The celebrated and holy Philogonius lived in the reign of Constantine the Great. After having finished his studies, he practised law, but in such a manner that he might serve as a model to all in a similar calling. He never undertook any lawsuit before he had thoroughly examined the case, and, being entirely frank with those who desired his assistance, he never pleaded a cause which seemed unjust. Nothing could deter him from what he thought right, neither fear of those above him, nor promises nor presents. The poor he served gratis, and he defended, both by word and writing, the widow and the orphan against the power of the great, never refusing his counsel to those whose means allowed but a small recompense or none at all for his services. Love for his neighbor was to him a greater incentive to work than eagerness to gain temporal goods. How high these noble qualities raised him in the estimation of the people was especially manifest, when after the death of the bishop, they were choosing a worthy successor to their late shepherd. The entire people insisted on having him as bishop, who, until then, had with so much kindness and justice, assisted them in their temporal affairs. The voice of the people was regarded as the voice of God, and Philogonius was consecrated Bishop of Antioch.

He administered his sacred functions in the most zealous manner. Saint John Chrysostom, who preached a magnificent sermon on Saint Philogonius, says himself, that to speak worthily in his praise surpassed all eloquence. Licinius, at that period, persecuted the Christians, and Philogonius did his utmost to protect them. He animated them to constancy and taught them not to allow either the loss of their temporal goods, nor other sufferings to separate them from Christ, or to leave the true Church, as they would deprive themselves of their eternal possessions, and would have nothing to expect but the pains of hell. By frequent representations of the unending joys of heaven and the torments of hell, he strengthened his flock so effectually in the true faith, that they were willing to suffer poverty and tortures, and even death, rather than leave it. When it happened that one would apparently forsake the true faith through fear of martyrdom, the holy man, though deeply grieved, spoke neither harshly nor unkindly to him, but, with a heartfelt compassion, represented the greatness of his sin, exhorted him to do penance and atone for his error, and encouraged him to constancy. When he saw that his admonitions were heeded, he greatly rejoiced and always treated the penitent with kindness, without ever reproaching him for his fault, or even alluding to it.

When the persecution of Licinius had ceased, Arius began to disseminate his heresy. No shepherd could be more solicitous to protect his sheep from an attack of wolves than Saint Philogonius was to keep the Heresiarch from his people and retain them in the faith of Christ. Arius confessed that Philogonius had been his strongest adversary and had opposed him most effectually. The holy bishop explained the wickedness of the new heresy, and refuted it as well in public sermons as in private discourses, by which he greatly benefited his flock. Besides this, he zealously endeavored to uproot all abuses that had crept in, and to plant in the hearts of all a hatred of sin and a love of virtue. Towards this end he directed all his exhortations, which had great influence over the people, as he supported his precepts by the example of his virtue. His conduct was so blameless, that even his enemies could find no fault in it. He was greatly devoted to prayer, and always sought refuge in it when he was in affliction. He allowed no comfort to his body, not even necessary rest. He guarded his sheep day and night, and the result was, that it was said of the Church at Antioch, that true virtue and piety reigned among all classes of people. Saint Chrysostom compares it to a well cultivated and fruitful garden, cleansed from thorns and brambles; and says that it showed the indefatigable care of him who had governed it. The Almighty wished, at last, to give the promised reward to His true and faithful servant. A sickness, apparently of no consequence, prepared his way. The thought of the labors he had undergone in his functions during his life, for the honor of God and the salvation of souls, gave him inexpressible comfort in his last hour; and the hope of going to heaven gave him the most ardent desire to die and rest in God. This wish the Almighty granted, to the great grief of the people of Antioch.

== Bibliography ==
- Butler, Alban (1857), F.C. Husenbeth (ed.), The lives of the fathers, martyrs, and other principal saints, With: The history of the blessed virgin Mary, by the abbé Orsini, tr. by F.C. Husenbeth, Henry
- Shea, John Dawson Gilmary (1922), "Saint Philogonius, Bishop", Pictorial Lives of the Saints – via CatholicSaints.Info
- St. Augustine's Abbey, Ramsgate (1921), The Book of saints - a dictionary of servants of God canonized by the Catholic Church, London: A & C Black
- "The Departure of St. Philogonus, Patriarch of Antioch", Commemorations for Kiahk 24, CopticChurch.net
- Weninger, Francis Xavier (1876), Lives of the Saints - July-December, P. O'Shea

Catholic Church titles
| Preceded by Vitalius I | Patriarch of Antioch; 318 – 322 | Succeeded by Eustathius of Antioch |
