= Commentary on the Hexameron =

Written theological work from the 4th to 5th century AD

The Commentary on the Hexameron of Pseudo-Eustathius is an anonymous commentary on the Genesis creation narrative written in Greek between 375 and 500 AD. More than 26 medieval manuscripts exist containing it, all of which give Eustathius of Antioch as the author. The work contains rather more material than a typical commentary on creation, including historical material down to the time of Alexander the Great, all excerpted from earlier Christian writers. Consequently, it has been given the Latin title Liber chronicorum ('book of chronicles').

The Commentary includes extracts from the lost writings of Alexander Polyhistor, and the author appears to have had direct access to copies of Polyhistor. It is also a useful early witness to the Physiologus. That it could not have been written by Eustathius of Antioch, who was deposed in 330, is clear from the material it draws from the Homilies on the Hexameron of Basil the Great, delivered around 370. In addition, Eusebius of Caesarea is labelled "holy" in the work, despite being an enemy of Eustathius. Although these factors mean that the name passed down in the manuscripts as the author cannot be right, no other obvious candidate for authorship is available.

A copy of the Commentary was discovered in Sicily by Cardinal Gugliemo Sirleto in 1583, who intended to publish it but did not do so. The first and only edition was printed in 1629 by Leo Allatius, with copious notes and a Latin translation, but also many misprints. The text and translation were reprinted by Jacques Paul Migne in the Patrologia Graeca, volume 18. No edition has been printed since. No translation exists in any modern language.

== Bibliography ==
- Leo Allatius, S. P. N. Eustathii archiepiscopi Antiocheni et martyris in hexahemeron commentarius, Lugduni (1629)
- J.-P. Migne, Patrologia Graeca, vol. 18, cols.707-794.
- F. Zoepfl, Der Kommentar des Pseudo-Eustathius zum Hexameron, Munster (1927).
