= Paulinus II of Antioch =

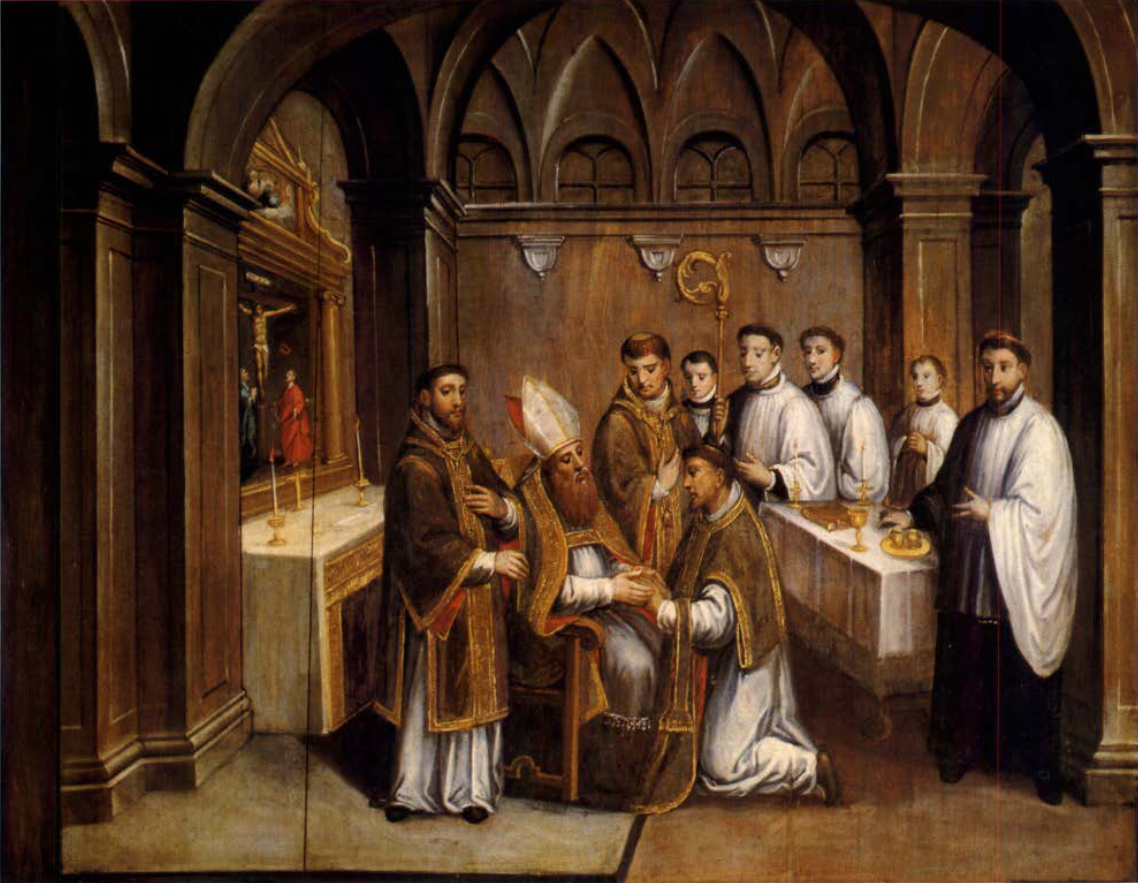
Saint Jerome is ordained by Paulinus, 17th-century painting by Simão Rodrigues (Jerónimos Monastery, Lisbon)

Paulinus II was a claimant to the See of Antioch from 362 to 388.

== History ==
Meletius of Antioch had been chosen as a compromise candidate between Catholics and Arians. He was neither a thorough Nicene nor a decided Arian. Members of the Eustathian party objected to Meletius as having been consecrated by Arians, and had begun to meet separately.

Shortly after becoming archbishop, the Arian bishop of Constantinople convinced the pro-Arian emperor Constantius II to exile Meletius back to Lower Armenia and to appoint an Arian bishop to Antioch. Meletius was succeeded by Euzoeus, who was also opposed by the anti-Arians. The synod of Alexandria (362) sent deputies to attempt an arrangement between the two anti-Arian Meletians and Eustathians; but before they arrived Paulinus had been consecrated bishop by bishop Lucifer of Cagliari, thus effecting a schism in the church.

Constantius II died in 361. His successor, Julian, although not a Christian, allowed Meletius to return. There were now three bishops.

Athanasius of Alexandria came to Antioch by order of the emperor, and expressed to Meletius his wish of entering into communion with him. Meletius, ill-advised, delayed answering him, and Athanasius went away having admitted Paulinus, whom he had not yet recognized as bishop, to his communion. The orthodox Nicene party, notably Athanasius himself, held communion with Paulinus only.

Paulinus was "highly esteemed for piety." He was acknowledged as bishop by Jerome, whom he ordained as priest, and by Epiphanius of Salamis. In 374 Pope Damasus I recognized Paulinus as archbishop and made him the papal representative in the East.

In 378, the Western emperor Gratian removed Euzoeus from Antioch, handing over the churches to Meletius. While the imperial court supported Meletius, the churches in Rome and Alexandria favored Paulinus. Basil of Caesarea supported Meletius.

His followers were called "Paulinians."

Meletius died in 381; Paulinus in 388. The schism did not end, as each side chose its own bishop. The parties did not reconcile until 415.

Religious titles
Preceded by Meletius	Patriarch of Antioch; 362–388 with Meletius (362–381); Flavian I (381–388)	Succeeded by Evagrius
