= Peter the Fuller =

Patriarch of Antioch from 471 to 488

- Patriarch of Antioch
- Church: Church of Antioch
- Installed: 471
- Term ended: 488
- Predecessor: Martyrius of Antioch; Julian of Antioch; Calendion of Antioch
- Successor: Julian of Antioch; John II of Antioch; Palladius of Antioch

Personal details
- Died: 488
- Denomination: Non-Chalcedonian Christianity

Peter the Fuller was Patriarch of Antioch (471–488) and a Non-Chalcedonian.

Peter received his surname from his former trade as a fuller of cloth. Louis-Sébastien Le Nain de Tillemont (Empereurs, tome vi, p. 404) considers that Peter was originally a member of the convent of the Akoimetoi, which he places in Bithynia on the Asiatic side of the Bosphorus, at Gomon, "The Great Monastery". He was expelled thence for his behavior and heretical doctrine, and passed over to Constantinople, where he courted persons of influence, through whom he was introduced to Zeno, the son-in-law of Leo I (457–474) and future emperor (474–491). He secured Zeno's favor, obtaining through him the chief place in the church of St. Bassa, at Chalcedon. Here his Non-Chalcedonian beliefs quickly became apparent, resulting in his flight to Zeno, who was then setting out for Antioch as commander of the East (Magister Militum per Orientem).

Arriving at Antioch in 463, Peter greatly desired the patriarchal throne, then filled by Martyrius of Antioch. He quickly befriended the populace, with whom he raised suspicions against Martyrius as a concealed Nestorian, thus causing Martyrius's tumultuous expulsion and his own election to the throne. Theodorus Lector dates this to 469 or 470.

When established as patriarch, Peter II at once declared himself openly against the Council of Chalcedon and added to the Trisagion the words "Who was crucified for us", which he imposed as a test upon all in his patriarchate, anathematising those who declined to accept it. According to the Synodicon, he summoned a council at Antioch to give synodical authority to this novel clause (Labbe, iv, 1009). The deposed Martyrius went to Constantinople to complain to Emperor Leo I, by whom, through the influence of the Patriarch Gennadius of Constantinople, he was courteously received; a council of bishops found in his favor, and his restoration was decreed (Theodorus Lector, p. 554). But despite the imperial authority, Peter II's personal influence, supported by the favour of Zeno, was so great in Antioch that Martyrius's position was rendered intolerable and he soon left Antioch, abandoning his throne again to the intruder. Leo I was naturally indignant at this audacious disregard of his commands, and he despatched an imperial decree for the deposition of Peter II and his banishment to the Oasis (Labbe, iv, 1082).

According to Theodorus Lector, Peter II fled, and Julian was unanimously elected bishop in his place (471), holding the see until Peter's third restoration by Emperor Basiliscus in 476 (Theophanes the Confessor, p. 99). During the interval, Peter II dwelt at Constantinople, in retirement in the monastery of the Acoemetae, allowed to reside there in return for a pledge that he would not create further disturbances (Theophanes, p. 104). During the short reign of Basiliscus (January 475 – August 476) the fortunes of Peter II revived. Under the influence of his wife, Basiliscus advocated for the Non-Chalcedonians, recalled Timothy II of Alexandria, Patriarch of Alexandria, from exile, and by his persuasion issued an encyclical letter to the bishops calling them to anathematise the decrees of Chalcedon (Evagr. H. E., iii, 4). Peter II gladly complied, and was rewarded by a third restoration to the see of Antioch, 476 (ib. 5). Julian was deposed, dying not long after.

On his restoration Peter II enforced the addition to the Trisagion, and behaved with great zeal against the Chalcedonian party, crushing all opposition by an appeal to the Syrian people, whom he had gained control over. Once established on the patriarchal throne, he was not slow to stretch its privileges to the widest extent, ordaining bishops and metropolitans for all of Syria. The fall of Basiliscus brought the ruin of all who had supported him and been promoted by him, and Peter was one of the first to fall.

In 485 Peter II again was placed on the throne of Antioch by Zeno on his signing the Henoticon (Theophanes, p. 115; Theodorus Lector, p. 569; Evagr. H. E., iii, 16). He at once resumed his zealous career, expelling Chalcedonian bishops who refused to sign the Henoticon and performing ordinations not recognised by Chalcedonians, especially that of the Xenaias (Philoxenus of Mabbug) to the see of Hierapolis (Theophanes, p. 115). He was condemned and anathematised by a synod of 42 Western bishops at Rome in 485 and excommunicated. He retained, however, the patriarchate at Antioch till his death in 488 (or according to Theophanes, 490 or 491). One of his last acts was the unsuccessful revival of the claim of the see of Antioch to the obedience of Cyprus as part of the patriarchate, which the First Council of Ephesus had removed from Antioch's supervision in 431.

== Sources ==
- Kosiński, Rafał (2010). "Peter the Fuller, Patriarch of Antioch (471–488)". Byzantinoslavica - Revue internationale des études byzantines. 68 (1): 49–73.
- Meyendorff, John (1989). Imperial unity and Christian divisions - The Church 450-680 A.D. The Church in history. Vol. 2. Crestwood, NY: St. Vladimir's Seminary Press. ISBN 9780881410563.
- This article uses text from A Dictionary of Christian Biography and Literature to the End of the Sixth Century A.D., with an Account of the Principal Sects and Heresies by Henry Wace
- Herbermann, Charles, ed. (1913). "Peter Fullo". Catholic Encyclopedia. New York: Robert Appleton Company.

Titles of Early Christianity
Preceded by Martyrius	Patriarch of Antioch; 471	Succeeded by Julian
Preceded by Julian	Patriarch of Antioch; 475 – 477	Succeeded by John II
Preceded by Calendion	Patriarch of Antioch; 485 – 488	Succeeded by Palladius
