= List of patriarchs of Antioch =

The Patriarch of Antioch was the head of the Church of Antioch. According to tradition, the bishopric of Antioch was established by Saint Peter in the 1st century AD and was later elevated to the status of patriarchate by the First Council of Nicaea in 325. The church first underwent schism after the deposition of Eustathius in 330 over the issue of the Arian controversy and persisted until its resolution in 414.

After the Council of Chalcedon of 451, the church suffered division until the deposition of Patriarch Severus of Antioch in 518 resulted in a permanent schism from which two separate lines of patriarchs emerged. The Non-Chalcedonian supporters of Severus went on to form what is now known as the Syriac Orthodox Church, whilst the Chalcedonians developed the church now known as the Greek Orthodox Church of Antioch.

== List of patriarchs ==
=== Bishops of Antioch to 324 ===
Unless otherwise stated, all information is derived from Chronologies of the Ancient World: Names, Dates and Dynasties and The Oxford Dictionary of Late Antiquity, as noted in the bibliography below.

1. Peter I (c. 37/47–c. 53/54) (Note: The traditions tying Peter to Antioch are rather late, and the traditions explicitly saying he served in the office of bishop while in Antioch are even later. Paul Parvis suggests they may have spread after the Synod of Antioch of 341. Still, most churches accept Peter's role in the early Antiochene church as service as bishop, even if the terminology was different in older writings.)
2. Evodius (c. 53/54–c. 68/83) (Note: Evodius' accession is placed in AD 41 by the Chronicle of John Malalas, in AD 44 by Jerome's Chronicle, and AD 45/46 by the Armenian version of Eusebius' Chronicle. However, modern historians place Evodius' accession in c. 53, or c. 54. The end of Evodius' episcopate is placed either in c. 68 as per Jerome's Chronicle, or in c. 83.)
3. Ignatius (c. 68–c. 107 or c. 83–115) (Note: Ignatius' episcopate is placed either in c. 68–c. 107 as per Jerome's Chronicle, or in c. 83–115 from the Chronicle of John Malalas.)
4. Heron I (c. 107/116–c. 127/128) (Note: Heron I's accession is placed either in c. 107 as per Jerome's Chronicle, or in 116 from the Chronicle of John Malalas.)
5. Cornelius (c. 127/128–c. 142/154) (Note: The end of Cornelius' episcopate is placed either in c. 142 as per Jerome's Chronicle, or in 154.)
6. Heron II (c. 142–c. 169 or c. 154–c. 164) (Note: Heron II's episcopate is placed either in c. 142–c. 169 as per Jerome's Chronicle, or in c. 154–c. 164.)
  vacant (c. 164–c. 169) (Note: Heron II's episcopate may have ended in c. 169, and thus no vacancy may have taken place.)
7. Theophilus (c. 169–182) (Note: The end of Theophilus' episcopate is placed in 177 by Eusebius' Chronicle, whereas others give 182, or c. 188 as per Sextus Julius Africanus.)
8. Maximus I (182–190/191) (Note: Maximus I's accession is placed either in 177 by Eusebius' Chronicle, in 182, or in c. 188 as per Sextus Julius Africanus. The end of Maximus I's episcopate is placed either in 190, or 191.)
9. Serapion (190/191–211/212) (Note: Serapion's accession is placed either in 190, 191, or 198/199.)
10. Asclepiades (211–220) (Note: The episcopate of Asclepiades is placed in 211–218, 211/212–217/218, or 211–220.)
11. Philetus (220–231) (Note: The episcopate of Philetus is placed in either 217/218–230/231, or 220–231.)
12. Zebinnus (231–237) (Note: The end of Zebinnus' episcopate is placed either in 237, or in 240.)
13. Babylas (237–250/251) (Note: Babylas' accession is placed either in 237, or in 240. The end of Babylas' episcopate is placed in 250/251, or in 253.)
14. Fabius (250/251–253/256) (Note: The accession of Fabius is placed either in 250/251, or in 253. The end of Fabius' episcopate is placed in 253, or in 256.)
15. Demetrius (253/256–260/261) (Note: The accession of Demetrius is placed in 253, or in 256.)
16. Paul (260–268) (Note: The episcopate of Paul is placed in either 260–268, or c. 260–268/269.)
17. Domnus I (268–273) (Note: The end of Domnus I's episcopate is placed either in 271/272, or in 273.)
18. Timaeus (273–279/280) (Note: The end of Timaeus' episcopate is placed either in 279/280, or in 282.)
19. Cyril (279/280–303) (Note: Cyril's accession is placed either in 279/280, or in 283.)
20. Tyrannion (304–314)
21. Vitalis (314–320) (Note: Vitalis' episcopate is alternatively placed in 313–c. 319.)
22. Philogonius (320–324)

=== Patriarchs of Antioch from 324 to 360 ===
23. Eustathius (324–330)
24. Paulinus I (330) (Note: Paulinus I is deemed either as Eustathius' predecessor with his episcopate in 323–324, or as his successor in 330.)
  Eulalius (331–332)
  Euphronius (332–333)
  Flacillus (333–342) (Note: Flacillus' accession is placed either in 333, or in 334.)
  Stephen I (342–344)
  Leontius (344–357) (Note: The end of Leontius' episcopate is placed either in 357, or in 358.)
  Eudoxius (358–359)
  Annanius (359)

=== Patriarchs of Antioch from 360 to 414 ===
Meletian line

25. Meletius (360–381)
26. Flavian I (381–404)
27. Porphyrus (404–414) (Note: The end of Porphyrus' episcopate is placed either in 412, 413, or 414.)

Arian line

- Euzoius (360/361–376) (Note: Euzoius' accession is placed either in 360, or in 361.)
- Dorotheus (376–381)

Nicene line

- Paulinus II (362–388)
- Evagrius (388–392/393)

Apollinarist line

- Vitalis (375)

=== Patriarchs of Antioch from 414 to 518 ===
28. Alexander (414–417) (Note: Alexander's accession is placed either in 412, 412/413, or 414. The end of Alexander's episcopate is placed either in 417, 421, or 424.)
29. Theodotus (417–428) (Note: Theodotus' accession is placed either in 417, 421, or 424. The end of Theodotus' episcopate is placed either in 428, or 429.)
30. John I (429–441) (Note: The end of John I's episcopate is placed either in 441, or 442.)
31. Domnus II (441–449) (Note: Domnus II's accession is placed either in 441, or 442.)

Chalcedonian line

32. Maximus II (450–455) (Note: Maximus II's accession is placed either in 449, or 450.)
33. Basil (456–458) (Note: Basil's accession is placed either in 456, or in 457.)
34. Acacius (458–459) (Note: Acacius' episcopate is placed either in 458, in 458–459, or in 458–461.)
35. Martyrius (459–471) (Note: Martyrius' accession is placed either in 459, or in 461. The end of Martyrius' episcopate is placed in 465, 470, or 471.)
  Peter II (471) (Note: Peter II was deposed by Emperor Leo I in 471, but continued to be recognised as patriarch by non-Chalcedonians until his death in 488.)
36. Julian (471–475) (Note: Julian's episcopate is placed either in 466–474, or in 471–475.)
  Peter II (475–477) (Note: Peter II's second episcopate is placed in 474–475, or in 475–477.)
  John II Codonatus (477) (Note: The episcopate of John II Codonatus is placed in either 475–490, 476/477, 476–477, or 477.)
37. Stephen II (477–479) (Note: Stephen II's episcopate is placed either in 477–479, 479–482, 490–495.)
38. Stephen III (disputed) (Note: The existence of Stephen III is supported by the Greek Orthodox Church of Antioch and Honigmann, however, he is not listed by most modern historians.)
39. Calendion (479–484) (Note: Calendion's episcopate is placed in 479–484, 479–486, or in 482–484.)
  Peter II (485–488) (Note: Peter II's third episcopate is placed in 484–491, or in 485–488.)
40. Palladius (488–498) (Note: Palladius' accession is placed either in 488, 491, or 496.)
41. Flavian II (498–512)
42. Severus (512–518)

Non-Chalcedonian line

32. Maximus II (450–455)
33. Basil (456–458)
  Acacius (458–459)
34. Martyrius (459–471)
35. Peter II (471)
  Julian (471–475)
  Peter II (475–477)
  John II Codonatus (477)
  Stephen II (477–479)
  Stephen III (disputed)
  Calendion (479–484)
  Peter II (485–488)
36. Palladius (488–498)
37. Flavian II (498–512)
38. Severus (512–518)

=== Patriarchs of Antioch from 518 to present ===
- List of Greek Orthodox patriarchs of Antioch
- List of Syriac Orthodox patriarchs of Antioch
- List of Latin patriarchs of Antioch
- List of Maronite patriarchs of Antioch
- List of Syriac Catholic patriarchs of Antioch
- List of Melkite Greek Catholic Patriarchs of Antioch

== Bibliography ==
- Allen, Pauline (2011). "Episcopal Succession in Antioch in the Sixth Century". Episcopal Elections in Late Antiquity. Walter de Gruyter. pp. 23–38.
- Bockmuehl, Markus N. A. (2010). The Remembered Peter: In Ancient Reception and Modern Debate. Mohr Siebeck.
- Burgess, Richard W. (1999). Studies in Eusebian and Post-Eusebian Chronography. Franz Steiner Verlag.
- Chadwick, Henry (2001). The Church in Ancient Society: From Galilee to Gregory the Great. Oxford University Press.
- De Giorgi, Andrea U.; Eger, A. Asa (2021). Antioch: A History. Routledge.
- Downey, Glanville (1961). A History of Antioch in Syria from Seleucus to the Arab Conquest. Princeton University Press.
- Eusebius of Caesarea (2019). The History of the Church. Translated by Jeremy M. Schott. University of California Press.
- Eder, Walter; Renger, Johannes, eds. (2007). Chronologies of the Ancient World: Names, Dates and Dynasties. Brill.
- Hainthaler, Theresia (2013). Christ in Christian Tradition: Volume 2 Part 3: The Churches of Jerusalem and Antioch from 451 to 600. Translated by Marianne Ehrhardt. Oxford University Press.
- Honigmann, Ernst (1947). "The Patriarchate of Antioch: A Revision of Le Quien and the Notitia Antiochena". Traditio. 5. Cambridge University Press: 135–161. doi:10.1017/S0362152900013544.
- Nicholson, Oliver, ed. (2018). The Oxford Dictionary of Late Antiquity. Oxford University Press.
- Parvis, Paul (2015). "When Did Peter Become Bishop of Antioch?". In Bond, Helen; Hurtado, Larry (eds.). Peter in Early Christianity. Wm. B. Eerdmans. pp. 263–272. ISBN 978-0-8028-7171-8.
- Ritter, Adolf Martin (2007). "Babylas of Antioch". In Hans Dieter Betz; Don S. Browning; Bernd Janowski; Eberhard Jüngel (eds.). Religion Past & Present: Encyclopedia of Theology and Religion. Vol. 1 (A-Bhu). Brill. p. 540.
- Rogers, Rick (2000). Theophilus of Antioch: The Life and Thought of a Second-century Bishop. Lexington Books.
- Shepardson, Christine (2014). Controlling Contested Places: Late Antique Antioch and the Spatial Politics of Religious Controversy. University of California Press.
- Whitby, Michael (2000). The Ecclesiastical History of Evagrius Scholasticus. Liverpool University Press.
- Wilmshurst, David (2016). Bar Hebraeus The Ecclesiastical Chronicle: An English Translation. Gorgias Press.
