= Porphyrus of Antioch =

Patriarch of Antioch from 404 to 414

- Patriarch of Antioch
- Installed: 404
- Term ended: 414
- Predecessor: Flavian I of Antioch
- Successor: Alexander of Antioch

Personal details
- Died: 414
- Denomination: Early Christianity

Porphyrus of Antioch (Greek: Πορφυρεύς Ἀντιοχείας, romanized: Porphýrios Antiokheías, Latin: Porphyrius Antiochenus) was a Patriarch of Antioch of the Meletian line during the Meletian schism.

== Death and Succession ==
He succeeded Flavian I of Antioch in 404 and died in 414 to be replaced by Patriarch Alexander of Antioch.

In the aftermath of John Chrysostom's deposal by the Synod of the Oak and a subsequent Synod in 404, John's opponents, Severian, Acacius and Antiochus sought to place priests opposed to John into positions of influence. When Flavian I died shortly after the exile of John, they rushed through a rapid election and consecration of Porphyrus. At the same time, many residents were at the Olympic Games, customarily held in July or August. The populace was offended that Constantius, Flavian's adjunct and a supporter of John's, was not installed.

== Bibliography ==
- Kelly, J. N. D. (1995), Golden Mouth, the Story of John Chrysostom, Ascetic, Preacher, Bishop, New York, Cornell University Press, ISBN 978-0-8014-8573-2, pp. 258, 286.

Titles of the Meletian group of Early Christianity
Preceded by Flavian I	Patriarch of Antioch; 404 – 414	Succeeded by Alexander
