= Julian (Chalcedonian patriarch of Antioch) =

Patriarch of Antioch from 471 to 476

Julian, sometimes numbered Julian I, was the patriarch of Antioch for about five years from 471 until 475 or 476. He was a Chalcedonian and a "fairly well-known person". His election as patriarch at a synod in Antioch was arranged by the Emperor Leo I on the advice of Patriarch Gennadius of Constantinople to replace the Miaphysite patriarch Peter the Fuller, who was exiled by Leo on 1 June 471.

Julian held the patriarchate through the remainder of the reign of Leo I and that of Leo II. In the unrest that followed Leo II's death, the Miaphysite Basiliscus seized the imperial throne and restored Peter the Fuller to the patriarchate. When Peter arrived in Antioch, Julian was so upset that he died "of vexation", according to Theodorus Lector.

Julian may the Julian who commissioned the treatise Against the Aposchists (i.e., schismatics, the Miaphysites) from John of Scythopolis, but it is more likely that Julian of Bostra was the Julian in question.

== Notes ==
Titles of Chalcedonian Christianity
Preceded by Peter II	Patriarch of Antioch; 471 – 475	Succeeded by Peter II
