= Stephen II of Antioch =

Patriarch of Antioch from 477 to 479

- Patriarch of Antioch
- Church: Church of Antioch
- See: Antioch
- Installed: 477
- Term ended: 479
- Predecessor: John II of Antioch
- Successor: Stephen III of Antioch

Personal details
- Died: 479
- Denomination: Chalcedonian Christianity

Sainthood
- Feast day: 25 April

Stephen II of Antioch (died in 479) was a Patriarch of Antioch from 477 until his death.

== Biography ==
It is unknown when Stephen was born. He became a Patriarch in 477, and he was a successor of John II of Antioch, who held the see only three months and was exiled. Stephen was killed in 479 and was succeeded by Calendion of Antioch.

He is venerated as a martyr saint on 25 April.

== Bibliography ==
- Meyendorff, John (1989). Imperial unity and Christian divisions - The Church 450-680 A.D. The Church in history. Vol. 2. Crestwood, NY: St. Vladimir's Seminary Press. ISBN 9780881410563.

Titles of Chalcedonian Christianity
Preceded by John II	Patriarch of Antioch; 477 – 479	Succeeded by Stephen III
