= Eustathius of Antioch =

Patriarch of Antioch from 324 to 330

Saint Eustathius of Antioch
- Patriarch of Antioch
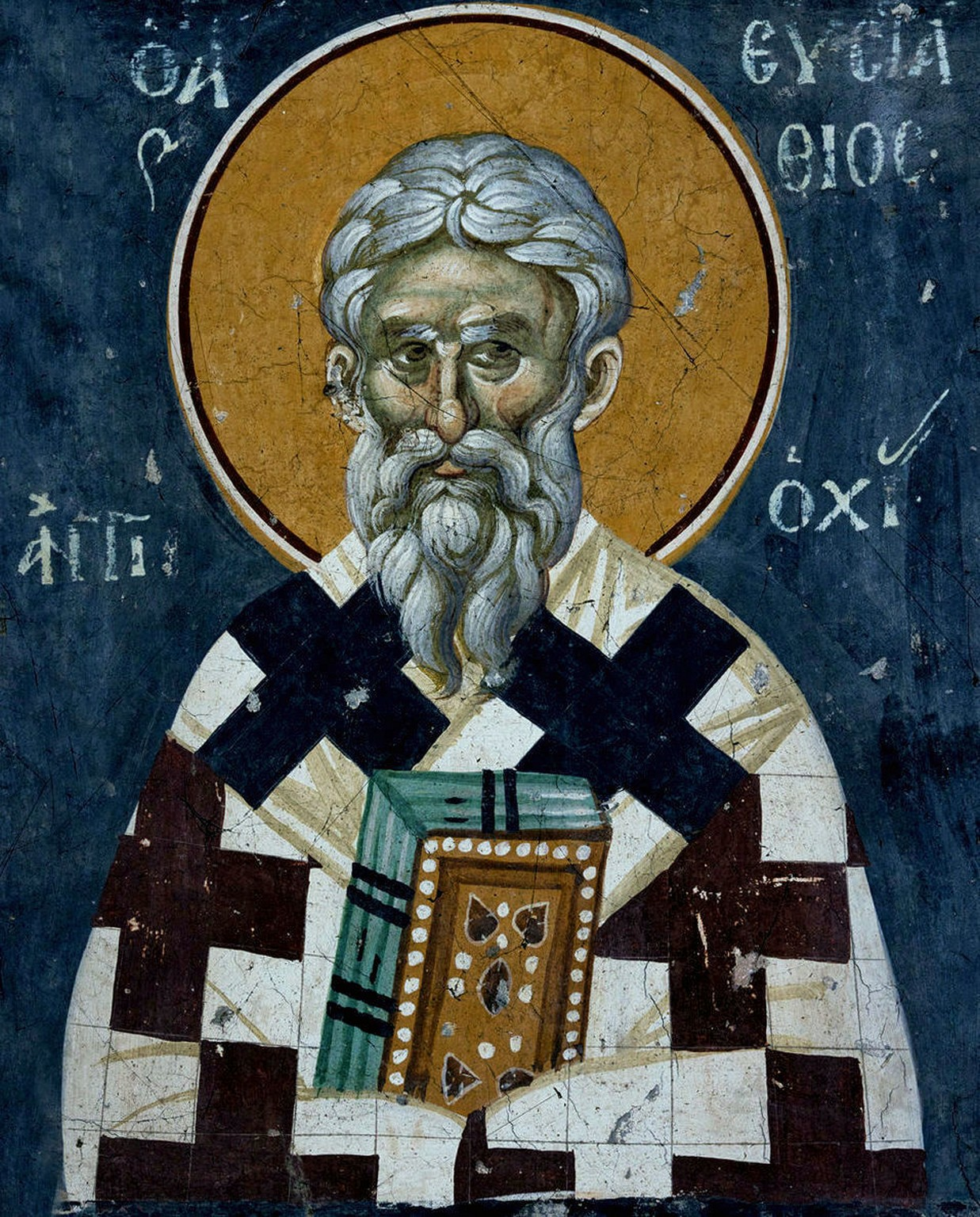
- In office: 324 – 330
- Predecessor: Philogonius of Antioch
- Successor: Paulinus I of Antioch

Personal details
- Born: Side, Roman Empire
- Died: c. 337 Traianopolis, Roman Empire

Sainthood
- Feast day: 16 July in Catholic Church; 21 February in Eastern Catholicism and Eastern Orthodoxy
- Venerated in: Catholic Church; Eastern Orthodox Church; Oriental Orthodoxy (esp. Syriac Orthodox Church and Coptic Orthodox Church)

Eustathius of Antioch, sometimes surnamed the Great, was a Christian patriarch of Antioch in the 4th century. His feast day in the Eastern Orthodox Church, Syriac Orthodox Church and Coptic Orthodox Church is February 21 (Amshir 27 in the Coptic calendar).

== Life ==
He was a native of Side in Pamphylia. About 320 he was bishop of Beroea, and he became patriarch of Antioch shortly before the Council of Nicaea in 325. In that assembly he distinguished himself zealously against the Arians, though the Allocutio ad Imperatorem with which he has been credited is probably not by him. At Nicaea, he and Marcellus joined forces with Alexander. In this way, they were able to significantly influence the formulation of the Nicene Creed.

His anti-Arian polemic against Eusebius of Nicomedia made him unpopular among his fellow bishops in the East, and a synod convened at Antioch in 330 deposed him for Sabellianism, which was confirmed by the emperor.

After Nicaea, the conflict at Nicaea between the Eusebians and the pro-Nicenes continued. "Within ten years of the Council of Nicaea all the leading supporters of the creed of that Council had been deposed or disgraced or exiled", including Eustathius. Arius and his theology were now no longer the focus of the Controversy. The focus of the controversy was around the concept of homoousios:

- The Eusebians, led by Eusebius of Caesarea, argued that this term implies Sabellianism, in which the Logos is part of the Father and has no real distinct existence;
- Eustathius accused Eusebius, an admirer of Origen, for deviating from the Nicene Creed:
  "The fifth-century ecclesiastical historian Sozomen reports a dispute immediately after the council, focused not on Arius, but [...] concerning the precise meaning of the term homoousios. Some thought this term [...] implied the non-existence of the Son of God; and that it involved the error of Montanus and Sabellius. [...] Eustathius accused Eusebius [of Caesarea] of altering the doctrines ratified by the council of Nicaea, while the latter declared that he approved of all the Nicaean doctrines, and reproached Eustathius for cleaving to the heresy of Sabellius".

Eustathius was accused, condemned, and deposed at a synod in Antioch. His supporters at Antioch rebelled against the decision of this synod and were ready to take up arms in his defence. But Eustathius kept them in check, exhorted them to remain true to their faith and humbly left for his place of exile, accompanied by a large body of his clergy. At the behest of Constantine the Great, Eustathius was banished to Trajanopolis in Thrace, where he died, probably about 337, though possibly not until 370. The Eusebians proposed Eusebius as the new bishop, but he declined.

When, after the death of Eustathius, Meletius became Bishop of Antioch in 360, the Eustathians would not recognise him, even after his election was approved by the Synod of Alexandria in 362. Their intransigent attitude gave rise to two factions among the orthodox, the so-called Meletian Schism, which lasted till the second decade of the fifth century.

"The schism at Antioch, between the Eustathians, or old Catholic party, under their Bishop Paulinus [...] and the new Catholic party under Meletius, had troubled both the East and West. The holiest Bishops in the East, such as Basil and Eusebius of Samosata, sided with Meletius. Damasus and the Western Bishops communicated with Paulinus. Meletius asserted Three Hypostases in the HOLY TRINITY, Paulinus I: Damasus would not allow the former, for fear of being considered an Arian, nor Basil the latter, lest he should be imagined a Sabellian. [...] Peter served as a kind of connection between the two conflicting parties, though his sentiments inclined to those of Damasus. Basil addressed a letter to him while at Rome, on the subject, in which he complains in very strong language, that the Western Bishops, who could not be so well acquainted with the actual state of affairs, should presume to class Meletius and Eusebius among the Arians".

The only complete work by Eustathius is the De Engastrimytho contra Origenem.

The Commentary on the Hexameron attributed to him in the manuscripts is too late to be authentic.

== Notes and references ==
=== Attribution ===
Titles of the Great Christian Church
Preceded by Philogonius	Patriarch of Antioch; 324 – 330	Succeeded by Paulinus I
