= Stephen I of Antioch =

Patriarch of Antioch from 342 to 344

- Patriarch of Antioch
- In office: 342 – 344
- Predecessor: Flacillus of Antioch
- Successor: Leontius of Antioch

Stephen I of Antioch (Latin: Stephanus) was the Patriarch of Antioch between 342 and 344, or 341 and 345 depending on the source. He was leader of the Arian party, called Eusebians, during the Arian controversy and an adversary of Athanasius.

== Arian councils ==
Stephen was present at the Council of Sardica (343) leading the arian party alongside Acacius of Caesarea, the successor of Eusebius of Nicomedia, where he fought for the depositions of Athanasius and Marcellus of Ancyra, something the orthodox party, spearheaded by Hosius, was not prepared to do. Angry with the result, the arians left the council and reunited again at the so-called Council of Philippopolis, which condemned the two bishops and pronounced an anathema against the Fathers at Sardica.

In 344, some orthodox representatives of Sardica visited Antioch (Vincent of Capua and Euphrates of Cologne). During the night, a harlot was found in their quarters and the event became a big scandal that, after an investigation, traced back to Stephen. As a result, a Council of Antioch in 344 deposed him.

== Notes and references ==
Titles of the Great Christian Church
Preceded by Flacillus	Patriarch of Antioch; 342 – 344	Succeeded by Leontius
