= Meletius of Antioch =

Patriarch of Antioch from 360 to 381

Saint Meletius of Antioch
- Patriarch of Antioch
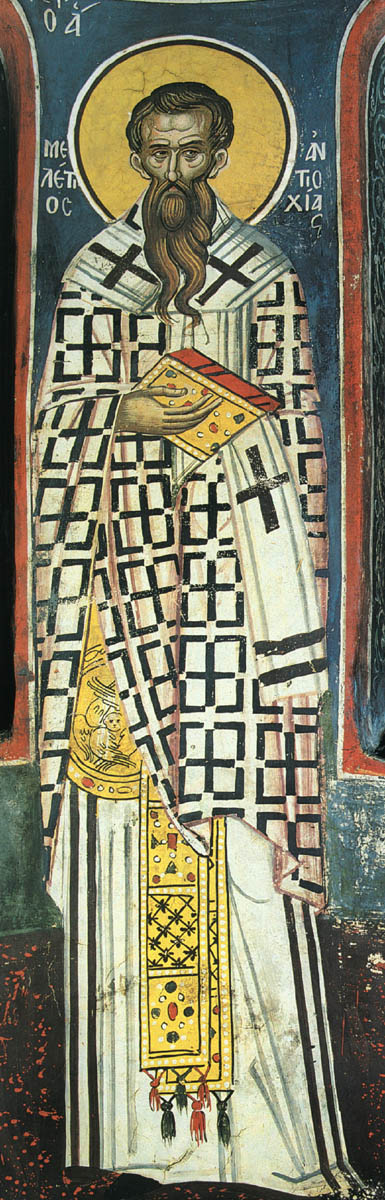
- Installed: 360
- Term ended: 381
- Predecessor: Annanius of Antioch
- Successor: Flavian I of Antioch

Personal details
- Born: Melitene
- Died: 381

Sainthood
- Feast day: 12 February
- Venerated in: Roman Catholic; Oriental Orthodox; Eastern Orthodox

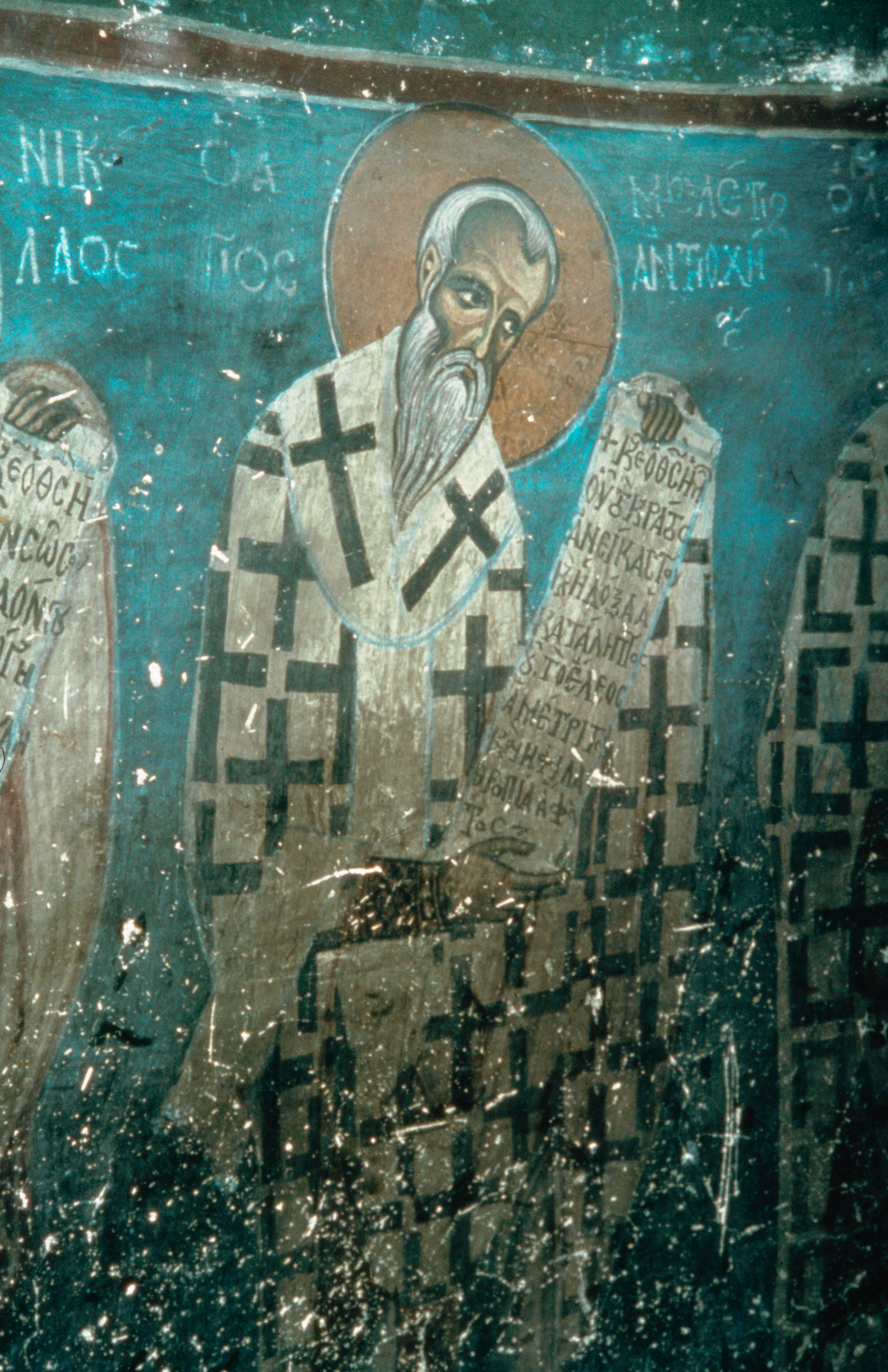
Fresco from Panagia tou Araka

Meletius of Antioch (Greek: Μελέτιος, Meletios) was a Christian patriarch of Antioch from 360 until his death in 381. He was opposed by a rival bishop named Paulinus II of Antioch and his episcopate was dominated by the schism, usually called the Meletian schism. As a result, he was exiled from Antioch in 361–362, 365–366 and 371–378. One of his last acts was to preside over the First Council of Constantinople in 381.

There are contrasting views about his theological position: on the one hand, he was exiled three times under Arian emperors; on the other, he was strongly opposed by those faithful to the memory of the staunchly pro-Nicene Eustathius of Antioch, whom the synod of Melitene deposed for his Homoousianism, which they considered a heresy, and by Saint Athanasius of Alexandria, a firm opponent of Arianism.

Meletius' asceticism was remarkable in view of his great private wealth. He is venerated as a saint and confessor in the Roman Catholic, Oriental Orthodox and Eastern Orthodox churches. His feast day is 12 February.

== Bishop of Sebaste ==
Meletius was born at Melitene in Lesser Armenia of wealthy and noble parents. He first appears around 357 as a supporter of Acacius, bishop of Caesarea, the leader of that local faction that supported the Homoean formula, which says that the Son is like the Father without reference to essence or substance. In contrast, the Homoiousians held that God and Jesus Christ are of like essence and the Homoousians that they are, as stated in the Nicene Creed, of the same essence. Meletius thus first appears as an ecclesiastic of the court party, and as such became bishop of Sebaste in succession to Eustathius of Sebaste. The appointment was resented by the Homoousian clergy, and Meletius subsequently resigned the see..

== Patriarch of Antioch ==
=== First period and exile ===
According to Socrates Scholasticus, Meletius attended the council of Seleucia in the autumn of 359 and then subscribed to the Acacian (Homoean) formula. Early in 360 he became patriarch of Antioch, succeeding Eudoxius of Antioch, who had been translated to the see of Constantinople. Early the following year (361), he was in exile. According to an old tradition, supported by evidence drawn from Epiphanius of Cyprus and John Chrysostom, this was due to a sermon preached before the emperor Constantius II, in which he revealed Homoousian views. This explanation, however, is rejected by G. F. Loofs on the grounds that the sermon contains nothing inconsistent with the Acacian position favoured by the court party; on the other hand, there is evidence of conflicts with the clergy, quite apart from any questions of orthodoxy, which may have led to the patriarch's deposition. Meletius believed that truth lay in delicate distinctions, but his formula was so indefinite that it is difficult to grasp it with precision. He was neither a thorough Nicene nor a decided Arian.

The Eustathians elected as rival patriarch the presbyter Paulinus. The synod of Alexandria (362) sent deputies to attempt an arrangement between the two anti-Arian churches, but before they arrived Paulinus had been consecrated patriarch by Lucifer of Cagliari. When in consequence of the emperor Julian's contemptuous policy Meletius returned, he found himself as one of three rival bishops.

The Meletian Schism was a dispute in Antioch between two pro-Nicene groups; the Meletians, who maintained that the Father, Son, and Holy Spirit are three hypostases, and the older pro-Nicene group, the Eustathians, who preferred the language of a single hypostasis and described the Father, Son, and Holy Spirit as three prosōpa (a Greek term which can mean both "person" and "mask"). Basil of Caesarea objected that the Sabellians also used this term and that it does not make sufficient distinction between the Persons. Basil wrote:

"It is not enough to count differences in the prosōpa. It is necessary also to confess that each prosōpon exists in a true hypostasis. The mirage of prosōpa without hypostases is not denied even by Sabellius, who said that the same God, though he is one subject, is transformed according to the need of each occasion and is thus spoken of now as Father, now as Son, and now as Holy Spirit". (Epistle 210.5.36–41.)

Philip Schaff summarized the Meletian Schism as follows:

"The doctrinal difference between the Meletians and the old Nicenes consisted chiefly in this: that the latter acknowledged three hypostases in the Divine Trinity, the former only three prosōpa; the one laying the stress on the triplicity of the divine essence, the other on its unity".

=== Second and third exiles ===
Athanasius of Alexandria came to Antioch by order of the emperor, and expressed to Meletius his wish of entering into communion with him. Meletius, perhaps ill-advisedly, delayed responding, and Athanasius went away having admitted Paulinus, whom he had not yet recognized as patriarch, to his communion. The orthodox Nicene party, notably Athanasius himself, held communion with Paulinus only. Twice, in 365 and 371 or 372, Meletius was exiled by decree of the Arian emperor Valens. A further complication was added when, in 375, Vitalius, one of Meletius' presbyters, was consecrated patriarch by the heretical bishop Apollinaris of Laodicea. After the death of Valens in 378, the Western emperor Gratian removed Euzoius from Antioch, handing over the churches to Meletius. Theodosius I, the new emperor in the East, also favoured Meletius, who had been more and more approximating to the views of the Nicene Creed.

=== Triumph ===
Upon his return to Antioch, Meletius was hailed as the leader of orthodoxy. As such he presided in October 379 over the great synod of Antioch, in which the dogmatic agreement of East and West was established. He helped Gregory of Nazianzus to the see of Constantinople and also presided over the First Council of Constantinople, the Second Ecumenical Council, in 381. Paulinus, however, was the man favoured by Rome and Alexandria. Jerome accompanied Paulinus back to Rome in order to secure him more support.

Meanwhile, Ambrose, bishop of Milan, was dealing with Arians in the West. He persuaded Gratian to call a church synod. The Council of Aquileia (381) deposed two bishops of the eastern province of Dacia, Palladius of Ratiaria and Secundianus of Singidunum, and requested the emperors Theodosius and Gratian to convene at Alexandria a general council of all bishops in order to put an end to the Meletian schism at Antioch.

The two remaining factions which divided the Antiochene Church were Orthodox, the supporters of Meletius and the adherents of Paulinus. Uniting them was a difficult move. A temporary pacification ensued when six of the leading presbyters took an oath not to seek episcopal consecration themselves but to accept as patriarch of Antioch whichever of the two rivals outlived the other.

== Schism after his death ==
Meletius died soon after the opening of the First Council of Constantinople and the emperor Theodosius, who had received him with special distinction, ordered his body to be carried to Antioch and buried with the honours of a saint. The Meletian schism, however, did not end immediately with his death. In spite of the advice of Gregory of Nazianzus, Paulinus was not recognized as the sole patriarch and Flavian was consecrated as Meletius' successor.

The Eustathians, on the other hand, elected Evagrius of Antioch as patriarch on Paulinus II's death in 388. In 399, John Chrysostom, who had been ordained a deacon by Meletius, but later separated from his group and accepted ordination to the priesthood at the hands of Evagrius, secured reconciliation between Flavian and the sees of Alexandria and Rome. However, it would take the Eustathians at Antioch until 415 to accept Flavian.

== Notes and references ==
Titles of the Meletian group of Early Christianity
Preceded by Annanius	Patriarch of Antioch; 360–381	Succeeded by Flavian I
