= Four Marks of the Church =

Four attributes of traditional Christian ecclesiology

The Four Marks of the Church, also known as the Attributes of the Church, describe four distinctive adjectives of traditional Christian ecclesiology as expressed in the Nicene Creed completed at the First Council of Constantinople in AD 381: "[We believe] in one, holy, catholic, and apostolic Church."

This ecumenical creed is today recited in the liturgies of the Catholic Church (both Latin and Eastern Rites), the Eastern Orthodox Church, the Oriental Orthodox Churches, the Assyrian Church of the East, the Moravian Church, the Lutheran churches, the Methodist churches, the Presbyterian churches, the Anglican Communion, and by members of the Reformed churches, although they interpret it in very different ways, and some Protestants alter the word "catholic" in the creed, replacing it with the word "universal".

While many doctrines, based on both tradition and different interpretations of the Bible, distinguish one denomination from another (largely explaining why there are many different ones), the Four Marks represent a summary of what many clergy and theologians have historically considered to be the most important affirmations of Christianity.

== History ==
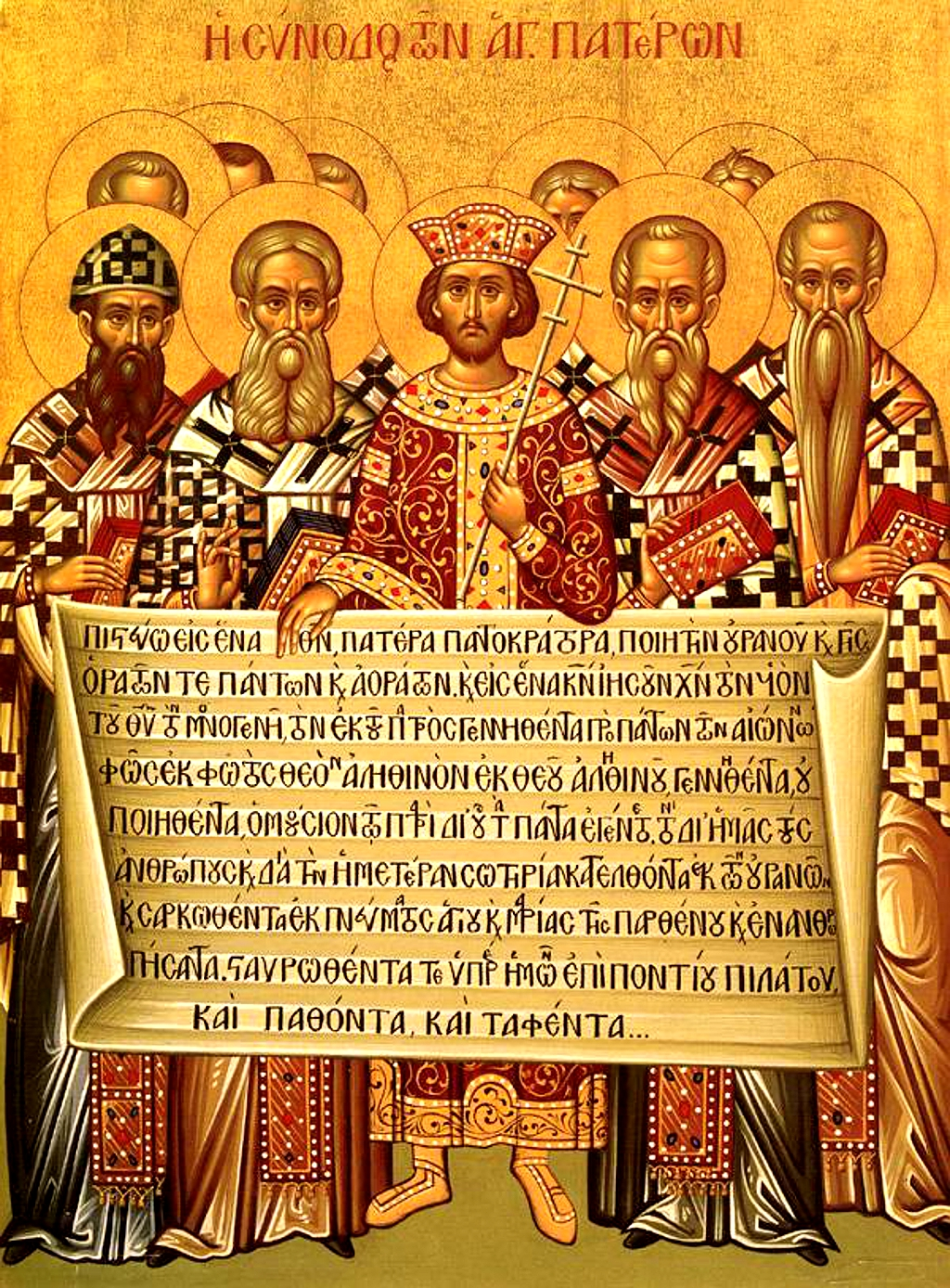
Icon depicting the Emperor Constantine, accompanied by the bishops of the First Council of Nicaea (AD 325), holding the Niceno–Constantinopolitan Creed of 381

The ideas behind the Four Marks have been in the Christian Church since early Christianity. Allusions to them can be found in the writings of 2nd-century early Church Father and bishop Ignatius of Antioch. They were not established in doctrine until the First Council of Constantinople in 381 as an antidote to certain heresies that had crept into the Church in its early history. There the Council elaborated on the Nicene Creed, established by the First Council of Nicaea 56 years before by adding to the end a section that included the affirmation: "[We believe] in one, holy, catholic, and apostolic Church." The phrase remains in versions of the Nicene Creed.

In some languages, for example, German, the Latin "catholica" was substituted by "Christian" before the Reformation by some, although this was an anomaly and continues in use by some Protestant churches. Hence, "holy catholic" becomes "holy Christian."

Catholics believe the description "one, holy, catholic, and apostolic Church" to be applicable only to the Catholic Church. They hold that "Christ established here on earth only one Church" and they believe in "the full identity of the Church of Christ with the Catholic Church". While "there are numerous elements of sanctification and of truth which are found outside her structure", these, "as gifts properly belonging to the Church of Christ, impel towards Catholic Unity". The eastern churches not in full communion with the Catholic Church thereby "lack something in their condition as particular Churches". The communities born out of the 16th-century Protestant Reformation "do not enjoy apostolic succession in the sacrament of Orders, and are, therefore, deprived of a constituent element of the Church."

The Eastern Orthodox Church, in disagreement with the Catholic Church, regards itself as the historical and organic continuation of the original Church founded by Christ and his apostles. The Oriental Orthodox Churches disagrees with both and claims to be the historical and organic continuation of the original Church founded by Christ and his apostles, the "one, holy, catholic, and apostolic" Church of the ancient Christian creeds and the only Church that has always kept the true Christology and faith declared by the first three councils, the First Council of Nicaea, the First Council of Constantinople, and the Council of Ephesus affirmed by the Church Fathers and the sacred tradition.

The Augsburg Confession found within the Book of Concord, a compendium of belief of the Lutheran churches, teaches that "the faith as confessed by Luther and his followers is nothing new, but the true catholic faith, and that their churches represent the true catholic or universal church." When the Lutherans presented the Augsburg Confession to Charles V, Holy Roman Emperor in 1530, they believe to have "showed that each article of faith and practice was true first of all to Holy Scripture, and then also to the teaching of the church fathers and the councils." As such, the Lutheran churches traditionally hold that theirs represents the true visible Church.

== Marks ==
=== One ===
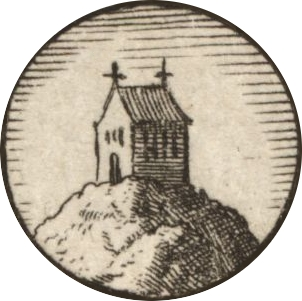
"One Church", illustration of Article 7 of the Augsburg Confession

This mark derives from the Pauline epistles, which state that the Church is "one". In 1 Cor. 15:9, Paul the Apostle spoke of himself as having persecuted "the church of God", not just the local church in Jerusalem but the same church that he addresses at the beginning of that letter as "the church of God that is in Corinth" (1 Cor. 1:2). In the same letter, he tells Christians: "You are the body of Christ and individually members of it" (1 Cor. 12:27), and declares that, "just as the body is one and has many members, and all the members of the body, though many, are one body, so it is with Christ" (1 Cor. 12:12).

In Eph. 4:5–6, Paul writes: "There is one body and one Spirit—just as you were called to the one hope that belongs to your call—one Lord, one faith, one baptism, one God and Father of all, who is over all and through all and in all." This list of factors making Christians one body, one church, is doubtless not meant to be exhaustive, says Francis A. Sullivan, but it affirms the oneness of the body, the Church, through what Christians have in common—what they have communion in.

Elsewhere, Paul says: "There is neither Jew nor Greek, there is neither slave nor free, there is no male and female, for you are all one in Christ Jesus" (Gal. 3:28). This statement was about Christians as individuals, but it applied to them also as groups, as local church, whether composed mainly of Jewish or Gentile Christians.

=== Holy ===
The word holy in this sense means set apart for a special purpose by and for God. The Church is holy because it has been set apart to do God's work, and because God is present in it. Christians understand the holiness of the Church to derive from Christ's holiness.

=== Catholic ===
The word catholic is derived from the Ancient Greek adjective καθολικός (romanized: katholikos), meaning "general", "universal". It is associated with the Greek adverb καθόλου (katholou), meaning "according to the whole", "entirely", or "in general", a combination of the preposition κατά meaning "according to" and the adjective ὅλος meaning "whole".

Applied to the Church, the adjective "catholic" means that in the Church the wholeness of the Christian faith, full and complete, all-embracing, and with nothing lacking, is proclaimed to all people without excluding any part of the faith or any class or group of people. The adjective can be applied not only to the Church as spread throughout the world but also to each local manifestation of the Church, in each of which nothing essential is lacking for it to be the genuine body of Christ.

For his subjects, Roman Emperor Theodosius I restricted the term "catholic Christians" to believers in "the one deity of the Father, the Son and the Holy Spirit, in equal majesty and in a holy Trinity", and applied the name "heretics" to others (Edict of Thessalonica of 27 February 380).

=== Apostolic ===
This describes the Church's foundation and beliefs as rooted and continuing in the living tradition of the apostles of Jesus. The Catholic Church, the Eastern Orthodox Church, Oriental Orthodox Churches, and the Assyrian Church of the East each claim to have preserved the original teaching of the apostles. They also have apostolic succession in that their bishops derive their authority through a direct line of laying on of hands from the apostles, a claim that they accept can be made by the other churches in this group. The Anglican Communion, as well as many Lutheran churches such as the Church of Sweden, likewise teach the doctrine of apostolic succession. Other Christian denominations, on the other hand, usually hold that what preserves apostolic continuity is the written word: as Bruce Milne put it, "A church is apostolic as it recognizes in practice the supreme authority of the apostolic scriptures."

== See also ==
- Orthodoxy in Christianity – Orthodox is sometimes informally added as a fifth Mark of the Church
- Marks of the Church (Protestantism)
- State church of the Roman Empire
