= List of Maronites =

This list of Maronites includes prominent Maronite figures who are notable in their areas of expertise.

== Arts, culture, and entertainment ==
=== Actors and Hollywood ===
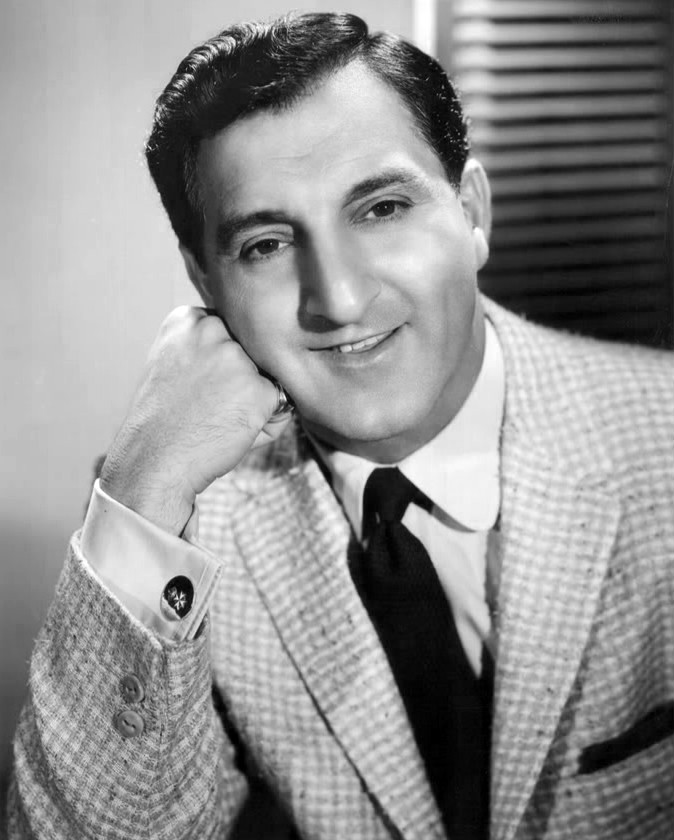
Danny Thomas

- Norman Issa, Israeli actor, director in cinema, theatre, and television
- Mario Kassar, Lebanese-American Hollywood producer, behind such movies as Rambo, Terminator II and Stargate
- Nadine Labaki, actress and director
- Kathy Najimy, actress
- Elie Samaha, filmmaker
- Tom Shadyac, Hollywood producer and director
- Tony Shalhoub, three-time Emmy Award and Golden Globe-winning American television and film actor
- Danny Thomas (born Amos Muzyad Yaqoob Kairouz), actor and founder of St. Jude Children's Research Hospital

=== Musicians ===
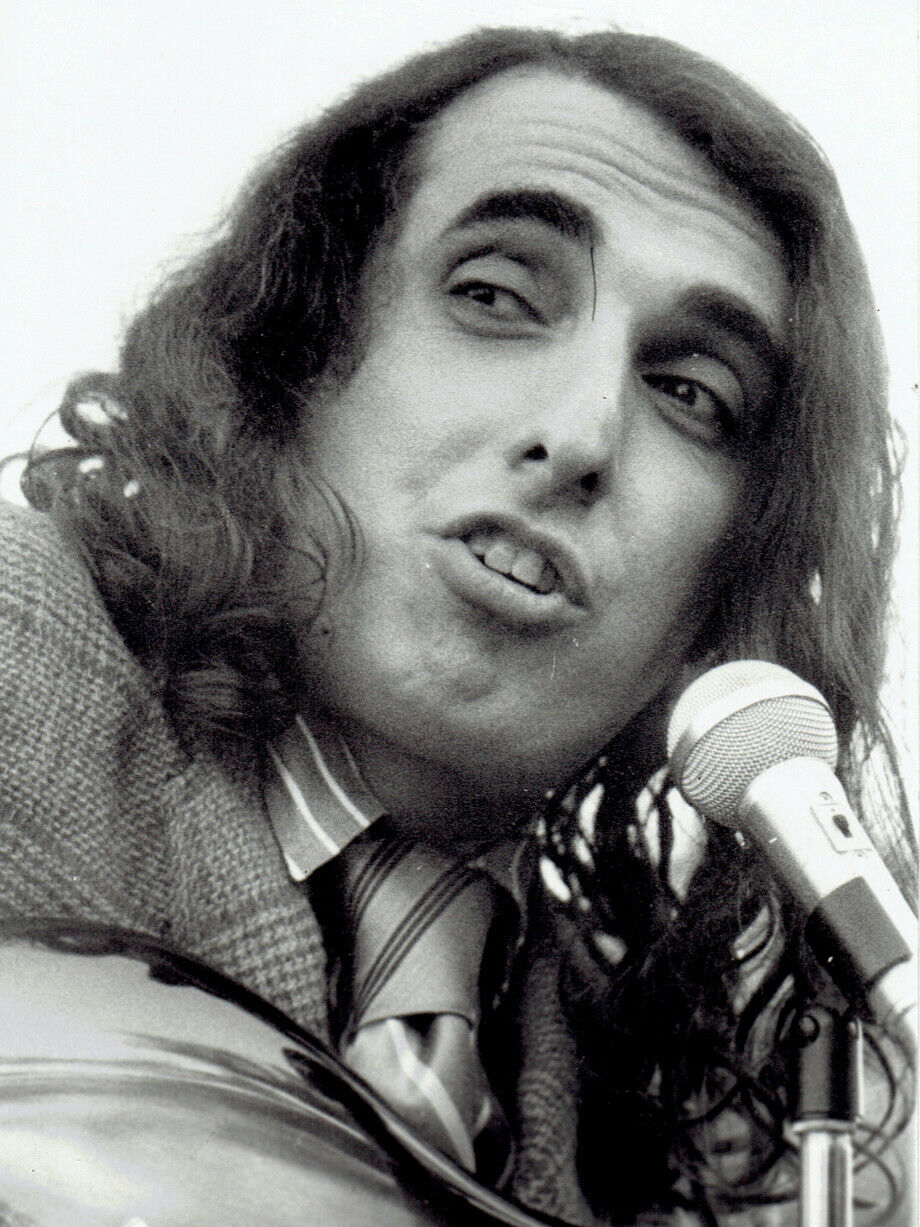
Tiny Tim

- Najwa Karam, singer
- Elissa Khoury, singer
- Marwan Khoury, singer
- Mika, singer
- Baba Saad, German rapper of Lebanese descent
- Nicole Saba, singer
- Gabriel Yared, Oscar-winning musician for the soundtrack of The English Patient
- Nawal Al Zoghbi, singer and actress
- Tiny Tim (born Herbert Khaury), American musician

=== Writers ===
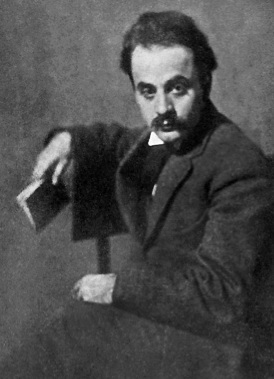
Khalil Gibran

- Amin al-Rihani, Lebanese-American poet
- Gibran Khalil Gibran, Lebanese-American artist and writer
- Callie Khouri, American screenwriter
- Michael Sallah, American Pulitzer Prize reporter

=== Other ===
- Joseph Abboud, American fashion designer
- Youssef Howayek, sculptor
- Joseph Philippe Karam, architect
- Octavia Nasr, Lebanese-American CNN editor
- Elie Saab, International fashion designer

== Business ==
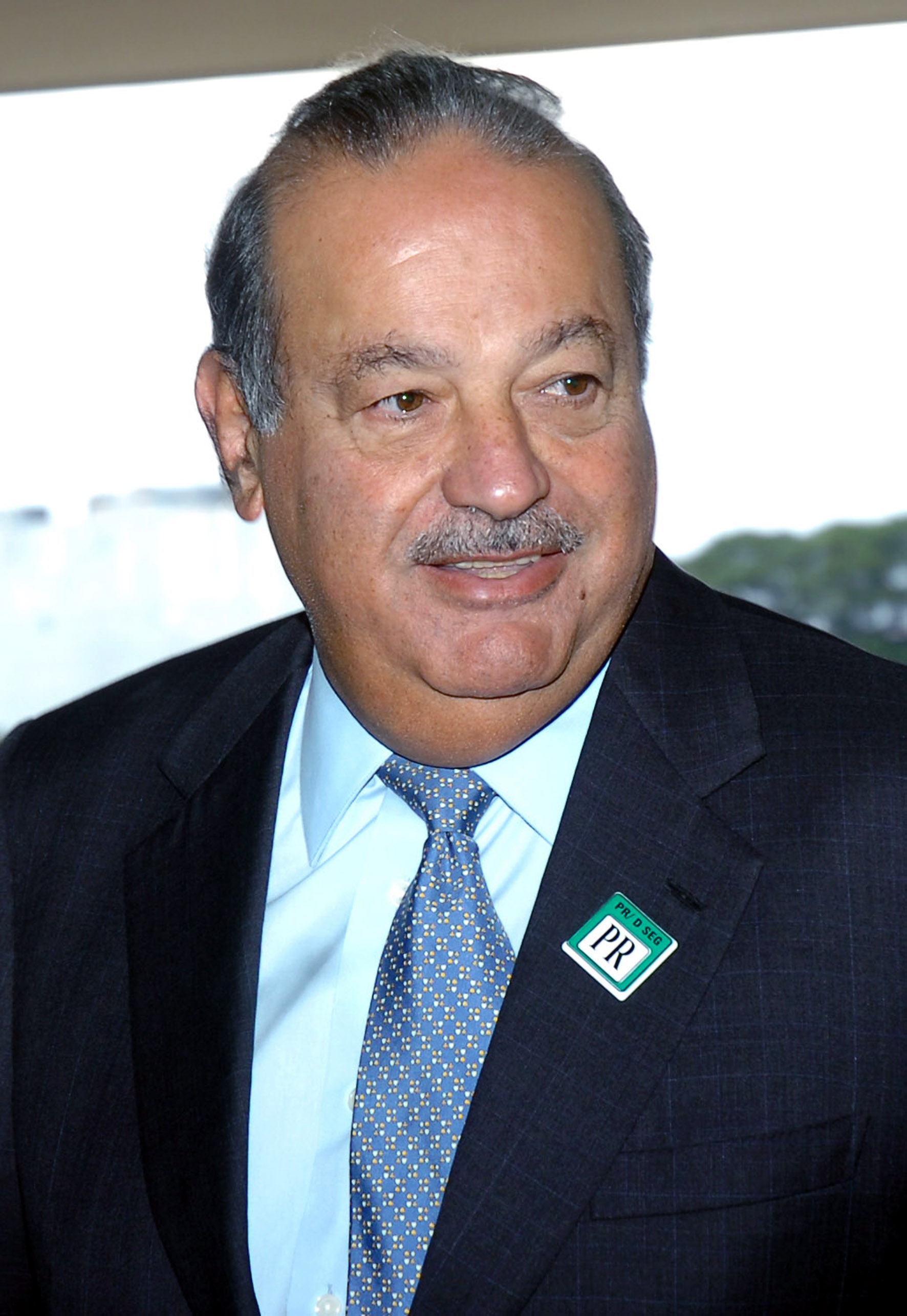
Carlos Slim Helú

- Gilbert Chagoury, Nigerian businessman and philanthropist
- Carlos Ghosn, Lebanese-French-Brazilian industrialist, CEO of Nissan and Renault
- Marie Henein, Canadian lawyer
- George J. Maloof, Jr., American entrepreneur
- Carlos Slim, Lebanese-Mexican, CEO of Teléfonos de México (Telmex) and many other companies in Mexico, and from 2010 to 2013, he was considered as the richest man in the world by Forbes.

== Government and politics ==
=== Argentina ===
- Juan Luis Manzur, Argentinian Minister of Health and Environment

=== Australia ===
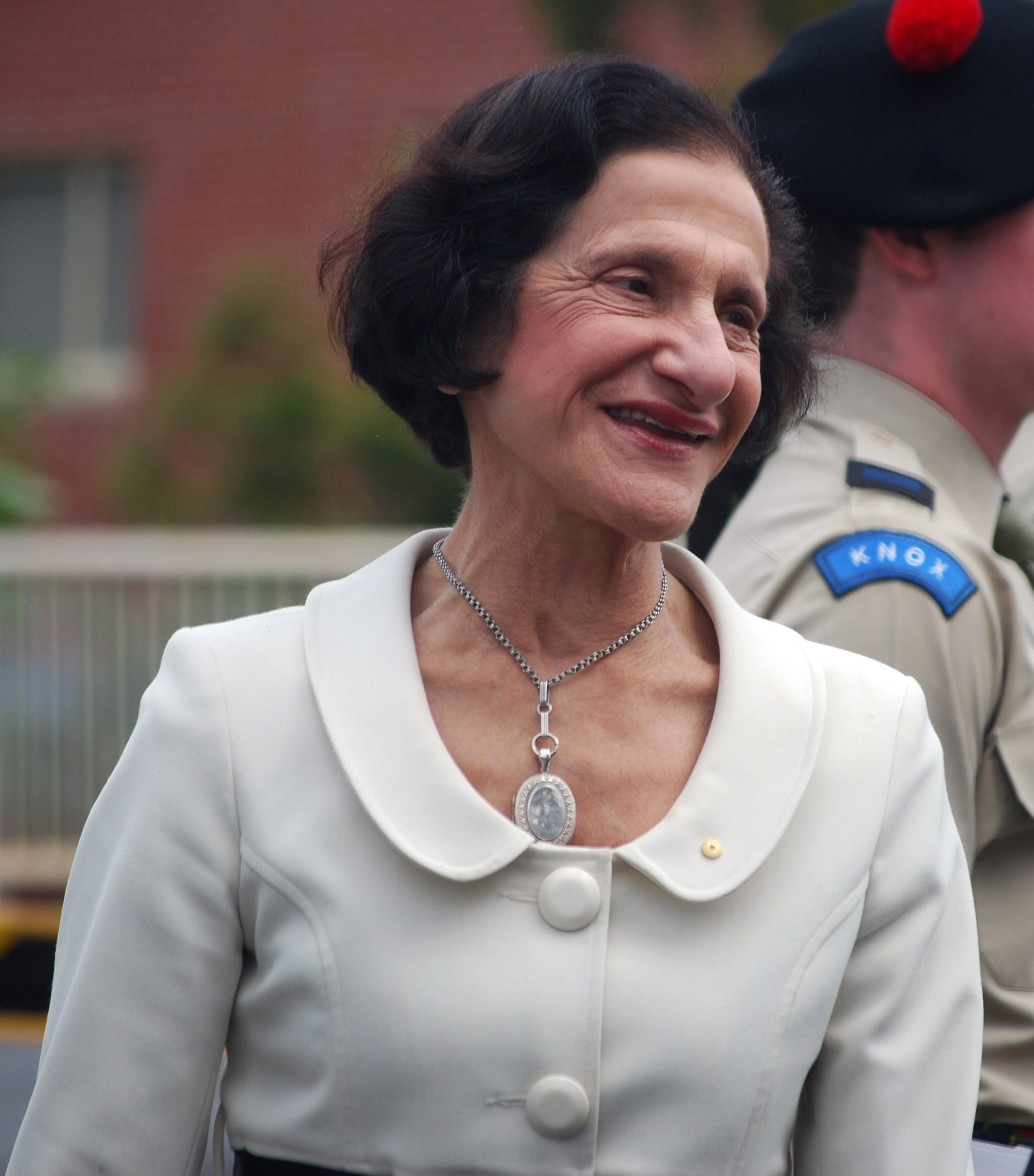
Marie Bashir

- Alexander Alam, political leader, member of the Australian Labor Party
- Marie Bashir, Governor of New South Wales, Australia
- Steve Bracks, former Premier of Victoria, Australia
- George Joseph, former Lord Mayor of Adelaide
- Bob Katter, Australian politician

=== Brazil ===
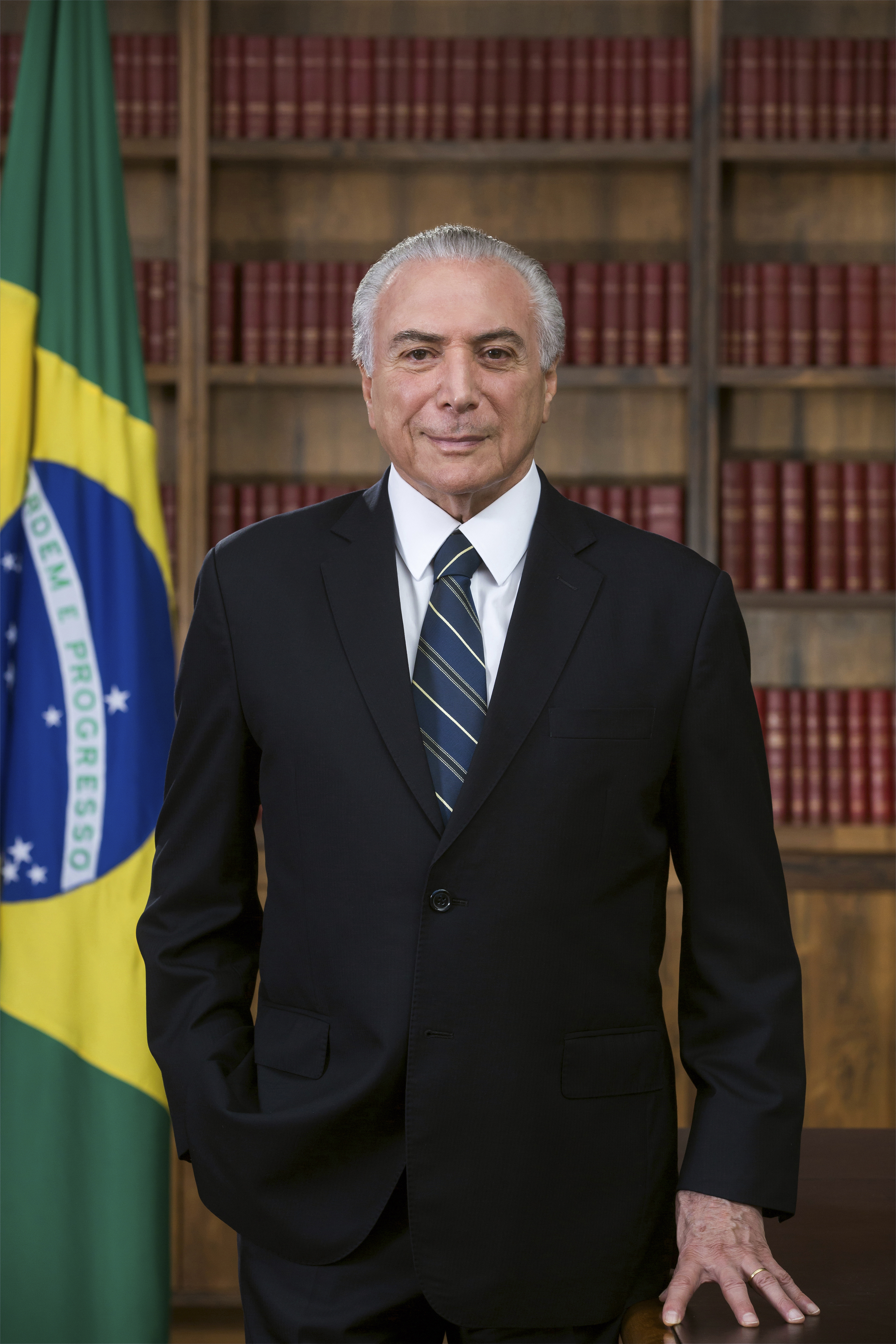
Michel Temer

- Paulo Maluf, former governor of São Paulo state
- Michel Temer, former president of Brazil

=== Canada ===
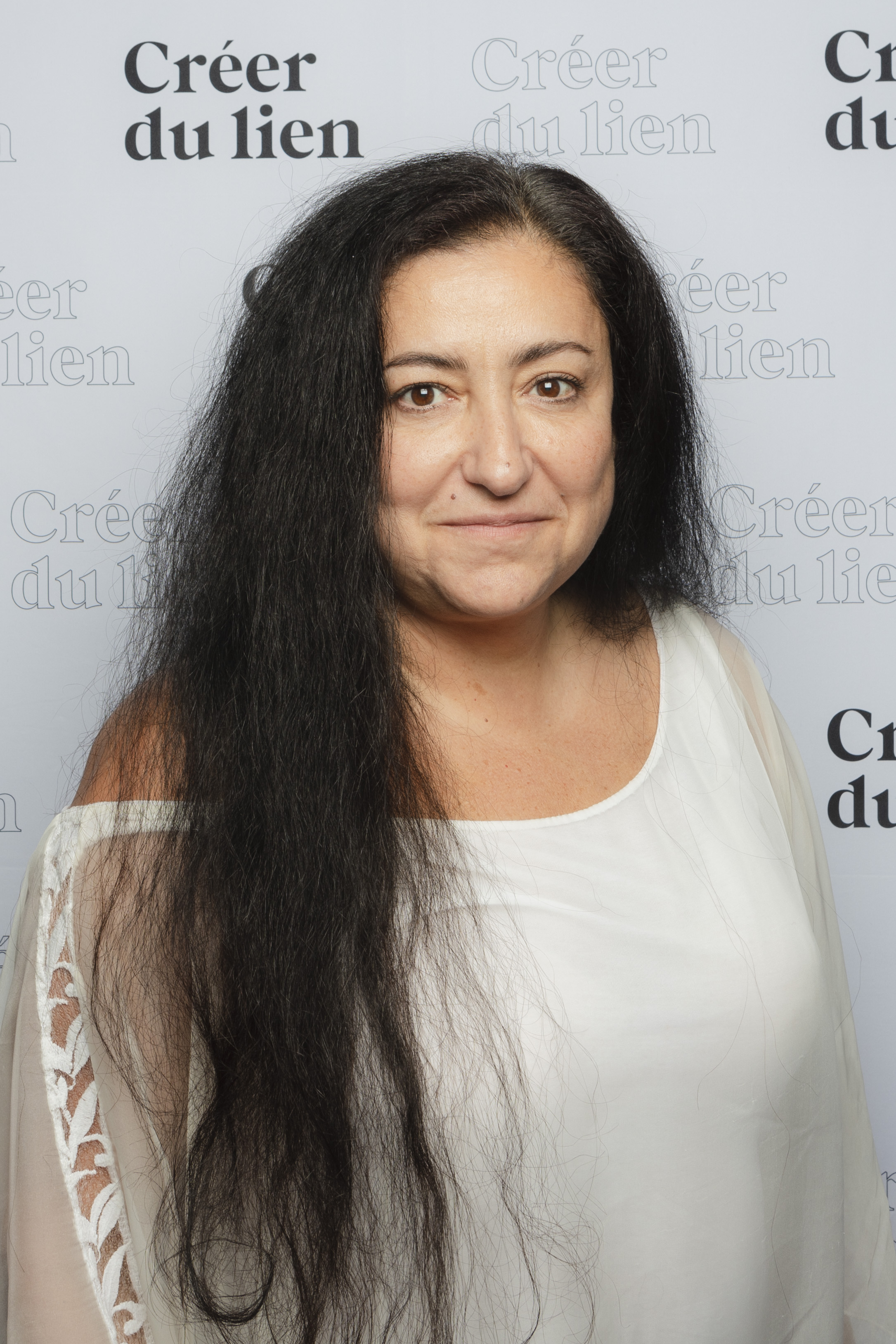
Maria Mourani

- Patricia Arab, member of the Legislative Assembly of Nova Scotia, Canada
- Mark Assad, Canadian politician
- Michael Basha, former member of the Senate of Canada
- Pierre de Bané, Canadian Senator
- Lena Diab, Attorney General, Minister of Justice and Minister of Immigration for the Province of Nova Scotia, Canada
- Fonse Faour, former leader of the Newfoundland and Labrador New Democratic Party and judge in the trial division of the Supreme Court of Newfoundland and Labrador
- Eddie Francis, mayor of Windsor, Ontario
- Joe Ghiz, premier of Prince Edward Island, Canada
- Robert Ghiz, premier of Prince Edward Island, Canada
- Mac Harb, Canadian politician
- Lorraine Michael, Canadian politician
- Maria Mourani, member of Canadian Parliament
- Frank Zakem, mayor of Charlottetown
- Paul Zed, Lebanese-Canadian politician

=== Ecuador ===
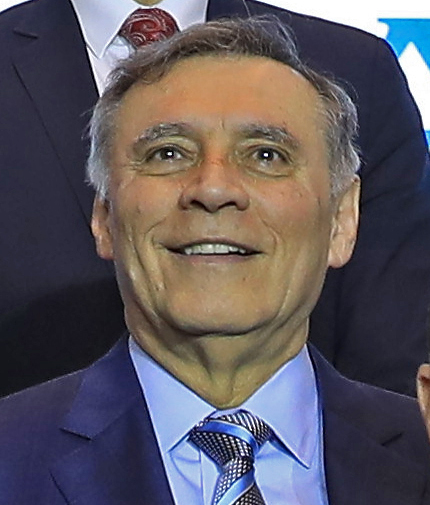
Jamil Mahuad

- Abdalá Bucaram, former President of Ecuador
- Alberto Dahik, former Vice President of Ecuador
- Jamil Mahuad, former President of Ecuador (1998–2000)
- Jaime Nebot, Ecuadorian politician
- Julio Teodoro Salem, former President of Ecuador

=== Guatemala ===
- Jorge Serrano Elías, former president of Guatemala

=== Israel ===
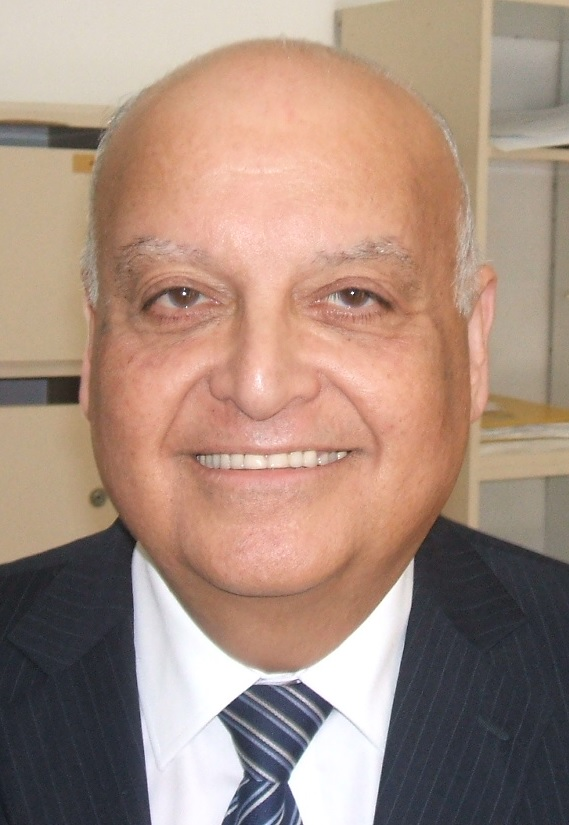
Salim Joubran

- Salim Joubran, judge in the Supreme Court of Israel

=== Jamaica ===
- Edward Seaga, former Prime Minister of Jamaica
- Ziadie family, prominent Jamaican merchant family

=== Lebanon ===
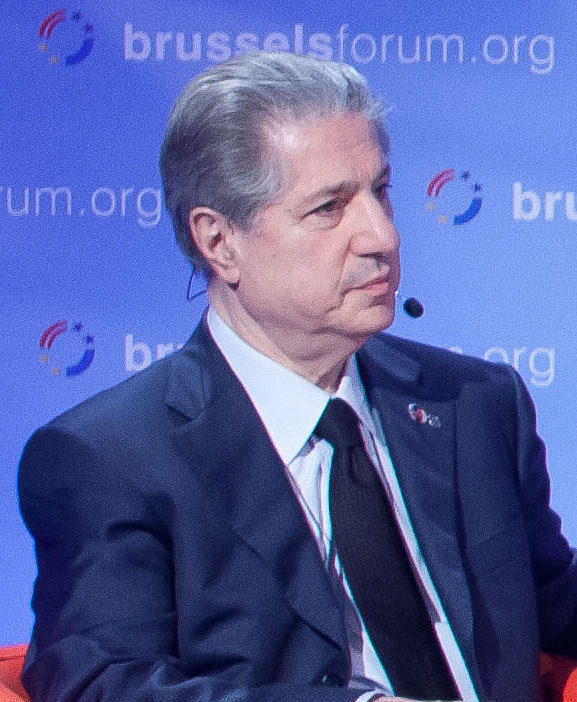
Amine Gemayel

- Pierre-Georges Arlabosse, President of the French Mandate of Lebanon (4–9 April 1941)
- Camille Chamoun, President of the Lebanese Republic (23 September 1952 – 22 September 1958), founder of the Ahrar Party, one of the fathers of the Lebanese Independence
- Fuad Chehab, President of the Lebanese Republic (23 September 1958 – 22 September 1964)
- Émile Eddé, President of the French Mandate of Lebanon (20 January 1936 – 4 April 1941) and President of the French Mandate of Lebanon (11 November 1943 – 22 November 1943)
- Bashir Gemayel, Lebanese military commander, politician, and president-elect. Founder of the Lebanese Forces
- Pierre Gemayel, politician, founder of Al-Kataeb party in Lebanon
- Youssef Bey Karam, Lebanese Nationalist Leader
- Bechara El Khoury, President of the Lebanese Republic (22 November 1943–18 September 1952)
- Amine Gemayel, President of the Lebanese Republic (23 September 1982–22 September 1988)
- Bachir Gemayel, President of the Lebanese Republic (23 August 1982–14 September 1982)
- Charles Helou, President of the Lebanese Republic (23 September 1964–22 September 1970)
- Elias Hrawi, President of the Lebanese Republic (24 November 1989–24 November 1998)
- Alfred Naccache, acting President of the French Mandate of Lebanon (9 April 1941–18 March 1943)
- Antoine Lahad (1927–2015), Lebanese Army Major General, and subsequently leader of the South Lebanon Army
- Émile Lahoud, President of the Lebanese Republic (24 November 1998–23 November 2007)
- René Moawad, President of the Lebanese Republic (5 November 1989–22 November 1989)
- Etienne Saqr ("Abu Arz"), Lebanese military commander and politician, leader of Guardians of the Cedars
- Elias Sarkis, President of the Lebanese Republic (23 September 1976–22 September 1982)
- Bashir Shihab II, emir who ruled Lebanon in the first half of the 19th century
- Youssef Salim Karam, former MP and leader from Zgharta (10 April 1910–4 February 1972)
- Salim Bey Karam, MP and former minister from Zgharta

=== Sierra Leone ===
- Edward J. Akar, former Sierra Leone Minister of Finance
- Joe Blell, former Sierra Leone Minister of Defence
- John Saad, former Sierra Leone Minister of Housing and Infrastructural Development

=== United States ===
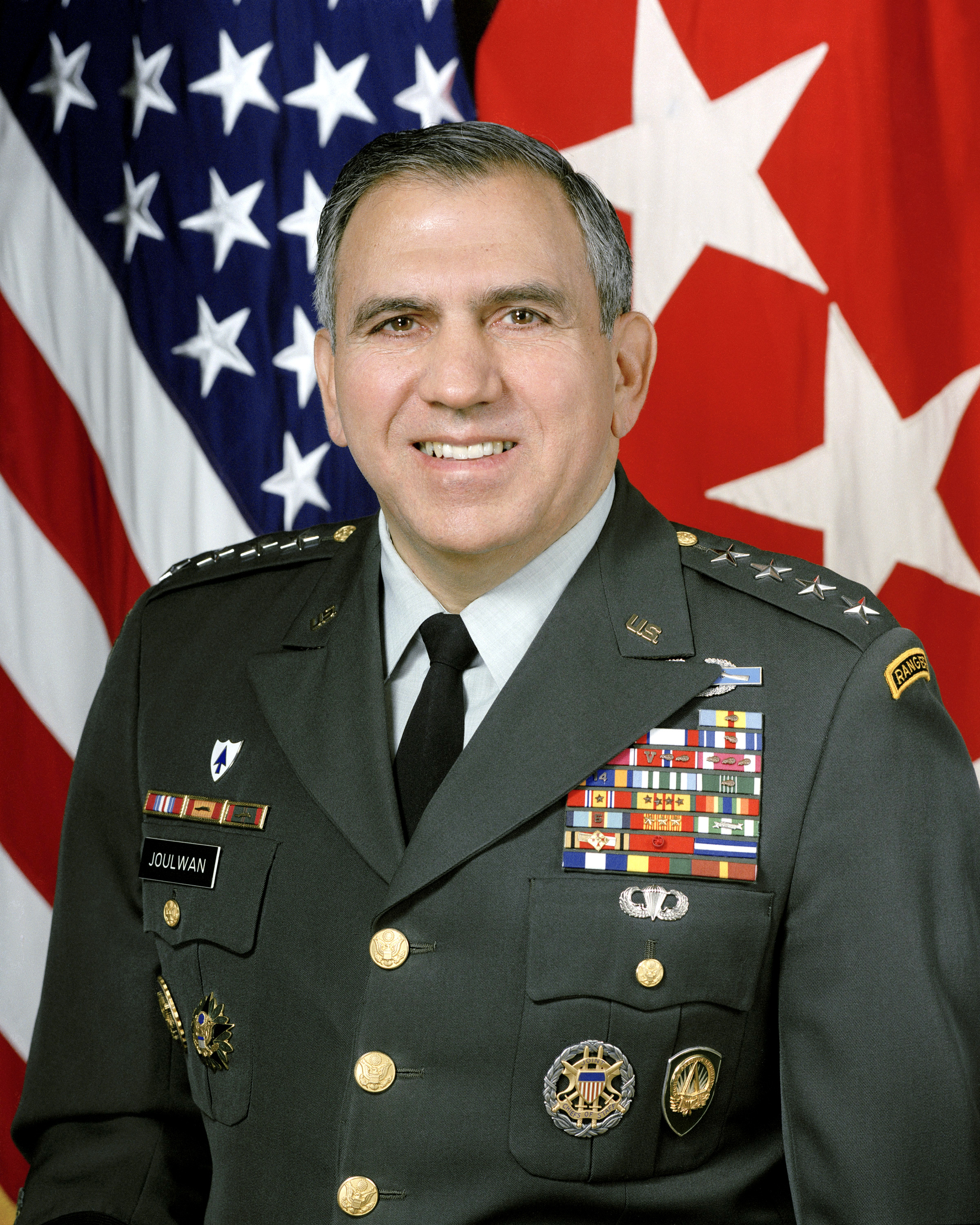
George Joulwan

- John Abizaid, former Commander in Chief of the US Central Command
- Spencer Abraham, former United States Senator and Secretary of Energy
- Ray LaHood, U.S. Secretary of Transportation
- George Mitchell, 17th United States Senate Majority Leader
- Donna Shalala, former US Secretary of Health
- Francis G. Slay, mayor of St. Louis, Missouri
- George Joulwan, Supreme Allied Commander, Europe (SACEUR) from 1993 to 1997

=== Uruguay ===
- Alberto Abdala, politician, painter and former Vice-President of Uruguay

== Religion ==
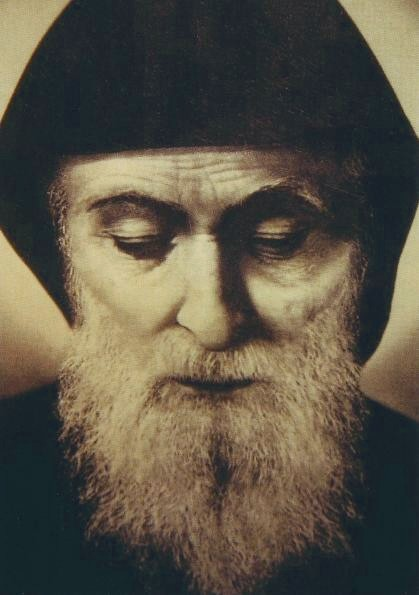
Saint Charbel

- Nimattullah Kassab Al-Hardini, Lebanese monk and priest, Catholic saint.
- Peter Ambarach, pioneer of printing in oriental languages and Bible linguist under Pope Clement XI.
- Giuseppe Luigi Assemani, Vatican orientalist.
- Giuseppe Simone Assemani, titular archbishop of Tyre, librarian of the Vatican and an authority on oriental manuscripts.
- Simone Assemani, professor of Oriental languages in Padua.
- Stefano Evodio Assemani, titular Archbishop of Apamaea in Syria and Vatican orientalist.
- Tobia Aun, archbishop, played role in 1860 Lebanon conflict.
- Domnina of Syria, disciple of Saint Maron, Catholic Saint.
- Abraham Ecchellensis, theologian famous for his translations of biblical texts into Arabic and Syriac.
- Theodore Khoury, prominent Catholic theologian.
- Marina, Lebanese female monk and "desert father", Catholic saint.
- John Maron, first Maronite Patriarch in history, Catholic saint.
- Maroun, Syriac Christian monk, founder of the Maronite religious movement, Catholic saint.
- Mitch Pacwa, S.J., American Maronite priest and television personality on EWTN.
- Rafqa Pietra Choboq Ar-Rayès, saint, canonized by Pope John Paul II.
- Victor Scialac, theologian and linguist, is thought to have given his name to Shylock, the main character in Shakespeare's The Merchant of Venice.
- Gabriel Sionita, theologian famous for his role in the publication of the 1645 Parisian polyglot of the Bible.

== Science ==
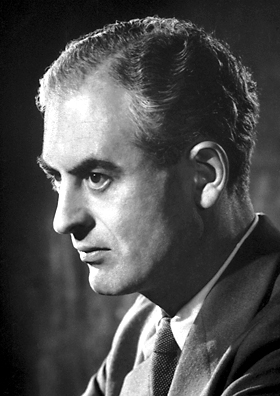
Peter Medawar

- Charles Elachi, Lebanese-American Director of NASA Jet Propulsion Labs
- Christa McAuliffe, secondary school teacher and first American civilian selected to be an astronaut; perished in the Space Shuttle Challenger disaster. Great-niece of historian Philip Khuri Hitti.
- Peter Medawar, British 1960 Nobel Prize winner in Medicine.

== Sports ==
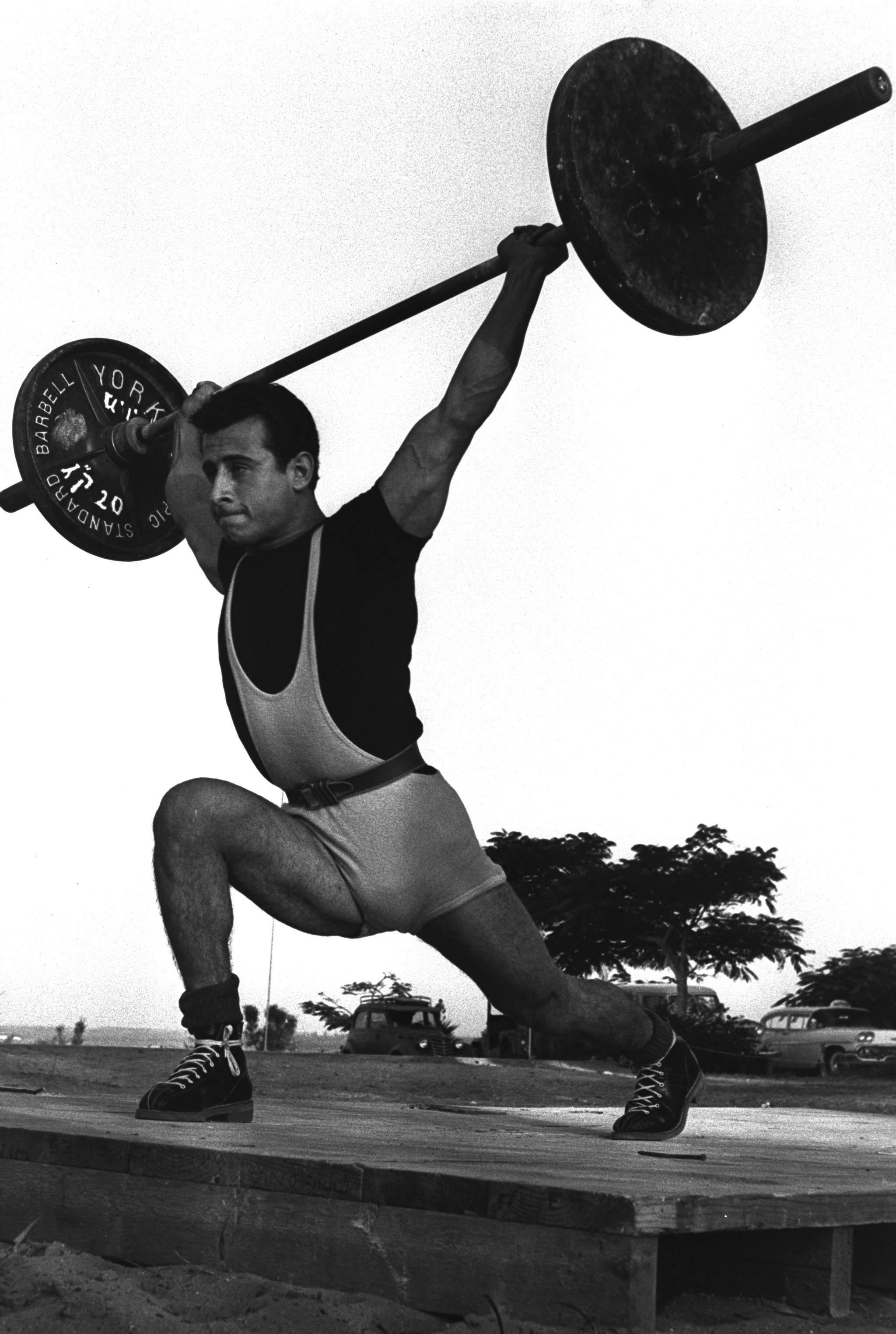
Eduard Meron

- George Daniel, American Commissioner of the National Lacrosse League
- George Diba, Israeli footballer
- Matt Freije, Lebanese former NBA player drafted by the Miami Heat; also played for the New Orleans Pelicans and the Atlanta Hawks from 2004-06
- Tony Kanaan, Brazilian race car driver
- Joe Lahoud, Lebanese-American baseball player
- Miguel Layún, Lebanese-Mexican footballer
- Eduard Meron, Israeli Olympic weightlifter
- Rony Seikaly, Lebanese-American basketball player at Syracuse University, 1st round draft pick of the NBA's Miami Heat in 1988
- Mario Zagallo (Zakhour), Brazilian national football team, player and coach
