= Ziade =

Family name

Ziade or Ziadé, and its common variants Ziadah, Ziadeh, Ziadie, Ziyadeh, Zyade and Zyadeh (Arabic: زيادة), is an Arabic surname that means "increase, overabundance, plus, addition or surplus" implying generosity, a cardinal virtue in Arab societies. It is rooted in the Arabic word of the same meaning Zayd (Arabic: زيد). It may refer to:

== People ==
- Alfredo Adum, also known as Alfredo Adum Ziadé – Ecuadorian lawyer and politician (1952–2023)
- Camille Ziade – Lebanese politician (1943–2022)
- Hoda Haddad-Ziade – Lebanese singer and actress (born 1944)
- Hoda Ziade – Lebanese fashion model
- Ignatius Ziade – Lebanese Maronite archbishop (1906–1994)
- Lady Colin Campbell, née Georgia Ariana Ziade – British author, socialite and television personality (born 1949)
- Lamia Ziadé – Lebanese illustrator and visual artist (born 1968)
- Maria Ziadie-Haddad – Aviator
- Marwan Ziade – Lebanese basketball player
- May Ziadeh – Lebanese-Palestinian poet, essayist and translator (1886–1941)
- Philippe Ziade (businessman) – Lebanese-American entrepreneur (born 1976)
- Philippe Ziade (journalist) – Lebanese journalist (1909 – 2005)
- Sonia Ziadé, Canadian politician from Quebec

== Other uses ==
- Zadeh, a suffix used in many Persian names
- Ziade Palace, a 19th-century grand mansion located in Zokak el-Blat quarter, Beirut, Lebanon

== See also ==
- Ziadi, surname variant in the Maghreb region
- Ziadie family
