= Arab Jamaicans =

Total population
- 22,000

Regions with significant populations
- Saint Andrew · Saint Catherine · Clarendon · Saint James · Saint Ann · Trelawny · Saint Mary · Manchester · Kingston Parish · Portland · Hanover

Languages
- Jamaican English · Jamaican Patois · Levantine Arabic · French

Religion
- Christianity · Islam

Related ethnic groups
- Arabs, Lebanese people, Syrians

Arab Jamaicans refers to Jamaican citizens of Syrian, Lebanese and Palestinian Arab or partial Arab origin or descent. Most are Christians who arrived in the late 19th century, brought by European colonialists.

== Notable people ==
- Richard Azan, People's National Party (PNP) politician and Member of Parliament
- Lady Colin Campbell, author, socialite, radio hostess
- Lisa Hanna, Miss Jamaica and Miss World 1993, politician
- Abraham Elias Issa, businessman, hotelier
- Joey Issa, businessman and philanthropist
- Ken Khouri, record producer
- Anita Mahfood, dancer, actress, singer
- Eli Matalon, businessman, politician
- Kurtis Mantronik, hip hop and electronic-music artist
- Ronnie Nasralla, sportsman, record producer, artist promoter, band manager
- Shahine Fakhourie Robinson, politician
- Edward Seaga, former Prime Minister of Jamaica
- Don Wehby, business executive
- XXXTentacion, rapper, singer, songwriter
- Edward Zacca, former Chief Justice of the Supreme Court of Jamaica; former Governor-General
- Ziadie family
- Maria Ziadie-Haddad, airline pilot
