= Akar =

Akar is a Turkish surname. It may also be of another origin. Notable people with the surname include:

== Turkish ==
- Furkan Akar (born 2002), Turkish short track speed skater
- Hulusi Akar (born 1952), Turkish Army general
- Meltem Akar (born 1982), Turkish female boxer
- Nasuh Akar (1925–1984), Turkish sports wrestler
- Rıdvan Akar (born 1961), Turkish journalist and author
- Zeki Akar (born 1944), Turkish judge

== Other ==
- Edward J. Akar, Sierra Leonean Deputy Finance Minister, economist, and lawyer.
- John Akar (1927–1975), Sierra Leonean entertainer, writer, and diplomat.
- Zeina Akar (born c. 1964), Lebanese politician

== See also ==
- Acar
