= Lady C =

Lady C may refer to:

- Lady Colin Campbell, also known as Lady C, British author, socialite and television personality
- Lady C (wrestler), Japanese professional wrestler
