= Odette Kaddo =

Lebanese-American singer (1927–1997)

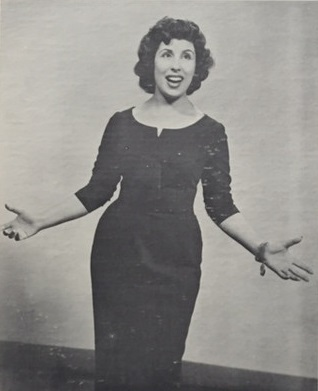
- Odette Kaddo in the 1950s
- Born: أوديت كعدو; August 21, 1927; Zgharta, Greater Lebanon
- Died: September 1, 1997 (age 70); Grosse Pointe, Michigan, US
- Other name: Odette Kaddo Peters
- Occupation: Singer

Odette Kaddo (Arabic: أوديت كعدو, August 21, 1927 – September 1, 1997), was a Lebanese-American singer.

== Early life and education ==
Kaddo was born in Zgharta, Greater Lebanon, the daughter of Jamile Corrah and Wadia J. Kaddo. She began singing as a child, accompanied by her brother, oudist Nasser Kaddo. "I was the Shirley Temple of Lebanon," she told an American reporter in 1990. "I have been well-known since I was a very young girl."

== Career ==
With encouragement from composer Mohammed Abdel Wahab, Kaddo sought a musical career in Cairo. She adopted an Egyptian accent in her speaking and singing to be accepted by audiences and producers there. She made her first recordings in Cairo under contract to Baidaphon Records. Her career prospered in the Middle East, and she sought wider audiences with appearances in Paris in 1954, and in the United States in 1955.

Her first concert in the United States was in March 1955, with her brother and other Lebanese musicians, at Brooklyn's Hotel Bossert. She also performed in Detroit, Binghamton, Wilkes-Barre, and Los Angeles that spring. In 1956 she sang at events in Miami and Jacksonville, Boston and Hartford, and across New York State, including a benefit concert in Syracuse. She made further recordings in the United States, on the Eastern Star and Zodephone labels, and later on her brother's Kaddo Records label.

In her later years, Kaddo was considered "the grand dame of the Arab-American singers", especially in Detroit. "My voice is better now," she said in 1990. "When you're younger, you can hit higher notes. But I put a lot more feeling into singing now".

== Discography ==
- Songs of the Cedars (1960)
- Odette Sings Just for You (1960)
- Music of Cleopatra and the Nile (1963)

== Personal life and legacy ==
Kaddo married Philip Peters in Detroit in 1957; he was also born in Lebanon. They had four children, and ran the Detroit Sausage Company together. She became a United States citizen in 1968. Her husband died in 1979, and she died from cancer in 1997, at the age of 70, in Grosse Pointe, Michigan. Three tracks by Kaddo are featured on Come On Honey: Arab-American Women ca. 1943–58 from Independent 78rpm Discs (Canary Records 2023). In 2015, the Lebanese American Chamber of Commerce remembered Kaddo at a tribute during their annual hafli in Michigan.
