= Empress Bianca =

2005 novel by Lady Colin Campbell

- First edition (2005)
- Author: Lady Colin Campbell
- Language: English
- Genre: Novel
- Publisher: Arcadia Books Ltd (2005); Dynasty Press (2008)
- Publication date: 2005 / 2008
- Publication place: United Kingdom
- Pages: 435 (2005)
- ISBN: 978-1-900850-90-2 (2005); 0955350700 (2008)

Empress Bianca, the first novel by Lady Colin Campbell, was initially published in June 2005. One month later, Arcadia Books, the British publisher, withdrew the book and pulped all unsold copies in reaction to a legal threat initiated on behalf of Lily Safra under her interpretation that the book was a defamatory roman à clef. After some changes the book was republished in the United States in 2008 by Dynasty Press.

== Plot ==
Bianca Barrett, the protagonist and daughter of a Welsh Surveyor and his Palestinian wife, becomes an "ambitious and mercenary" social climber and double murderer. Charming and well-educated, Bianca marries four times and advances in wealth and social influence.

With Bernardo, her first husband, Bianca has three children; they lose their son in a car crash. After a divorce, she marries the rich Ferdie, whose family owns the Piedraplata commercial empire. Before it comes to a divorce, the second husband is shot and killed by a hitman who makes it look like a suicide. The killing is arranged by her lover, Phillipe Mahfud, and Bianca becomes the financial beneficiary.

After a brief marriage to husband number three—she had married him only to make Mahfud jealous—she lastly marries Mahfud, a rich Iraqi businessman and banker. When their relationship sours, the banker dies with his nurse in a mysterious fire in his apartment in the tax haven of Andorra. Bianca's lawyers pay off the police and investigators, and the only justice that remains is in the court of public opinion.

== Pulping of first edition ==
In July 2005, Lily Safra claimed that her life had been "stolen" by the book and had her lawyer, Anthony Julius, demand that the publisher should recall the book and destroy unsold copies. Julius' letter indicated that Safra "regarded the book as defamatory". As English defamation law puts the burden of proof on the defendant, Arcadia Books complied, indicating that they were too small a company to fight the looming legal battle. The author, however, denied that she had used Safra's life as a template and claimed that it was based on characters of her own family, including her cousin Blanche, a double murderer. A countersuit ensued with Lady Colin Campbell demanding compensation for lost income. She did not prevail.

A rewritten, American edition of the novel was published in 2008 after the 17 specific issues that had been seen as pointing to Safra were addressed. With changes described as minor, but legally important—for instance, Barret now grows up in Mexico (not South America), her mother is Palestinian (Arab, not Jewish), and her last husband Iraqi (not Lebanese)—this edition still preserved story, plot, incidents, and dialogue elements.
