= Youssef Barakat =

Lebanese footballer and priest (born 1975)

Personal information
- Full name: Youssef Semaan Barakat
- Date of birth: 9 December 1974 (age 51)
- Place of birth: Zgharta, Lebanon
- Position: Left-back

Youth career
- Salam Zgharta

Senior career*
Years	Team	Apps	(Gls)
1998–2007	Salam Zgharta		(5)

International career
1999	Lebanon	5	(0)
- * Club domestic league appearances and goals

Youssef Semaan Barakat (Arabic: يوسف سمعان بركات; born 9 December 1975) is a Lebanese Maronite priest and former footballer who played as a left-back for Salam Zgharta and the Lebanon national team.

== International career ==
Barakat played for the Lebanon national team in 1999, playing four games at the 1999 Pan Arab Games.

== After football ==
Barakat holds a Bachelor of Theology from the Holy Spirit University of Kaslik. In July 2016, he became a priest of the Lebanese Maronite Church, and was part of the Eparchy of Ehden–Zgharta.
