= Marie al-Khazen =

Lebanese photographer (1899–1983)

Marie al-Khazen (1899–1983) was a Lebanese photographer. The photographs she created of rural life in 1920s Lebanon are considered to constitute a valuable and unique record of their time and place.

== Early life ==
Marie al-Khazen grew up in a mansion near Zgharta, in northern Lebanon. Her mother was Wardeh Torbey, and her grandmother was Sultana Daher.

== Photography ==
Marie al-Khazen was a "serious amateur" photographer with an Eastman Kodak camera. She had an interest in experimentation and the skills to set up and use her own darkroom. She sometimes posed her subjects and dressed them in particular clothing, such as in her striking "Two Women Disguised as Men", which is a portrait of herself and her sister Alice smoking and wearing Western business suits, under a large painted portrait of their grandfather, Shaykh Sa'id al-Khazen. Of this photograph, the New York Times art critic Adam Shatz said "Such pictures don't come along often, but once seen, they are impossible to forget, lodging themselves in the mind with the visceral force of revelation." Other photographs depict al-Khazen's interests in fishing, hunting, and driving automobiles.

Marie al-Khazen gave a box of over 100 negatives to journalist Mohsen Yammine sometime in the 1970s. The Arab Image Foundation now holds these and other works by al-Khazen, and they have included al-Khazen's photographs in several exhibitions. Others are known to be in her family's possession.

== Personal life and legacy ==
Marie al-Khazen died in 1983, aged 83 years. Her photograph "Two Women Disguised as Men" is featured in Fadia Abboud's short film In the Ladies' Lounge (2007). In it, a modern-day lesbian couple discovers a poster version of the photograph in a bookstore, and discusses the women in the photograph and what they imagine about the earlier women's lives.

== See also ==
- Khazen family
