= Peter Ambarach =

Maronite priest

Peter Ambarach (1663–1742) was a Maronite priest and a pioneer of printing in Semitic languages, operating for the Catholic church from Florence.

== Biography ==
Ambarach was born in Batha, Lebanon in 1663. From 1672 to 1685, he was educated at the Marionite College in Rome. He returned to Syria in 1685, where he was ordained as a priest.

He returned to Rome in 1691 to represent the Maronite Church in a legal dispute. After completing this assignment, he was commissioned by Cosimo III de' Medici to organize a Semitic-language printing establishment in Florence. His goal there was to prepare and print Semitic-language editions of theological manuscripts for the Palatina Library at Parma and the Laurentian Library at Florence. Soon after, he was designated the chair of Hebrew at the University of Pisa. In 1708, he became a member of the Society of Jesus, also known as the Jesuits.

Shortly after he joined the Jesuit order, Pope Clement XI appointed him to a commission intended to organize the printing of a corrected edition of the Septuagint. His most notable work is a collected edition of the works of St. Ephrem the Syrian, a prolific writer in the Syriac language, with accompanying Latin translation. He had only published two volumes of this collection when he died in 1742. The third volume was completed by Stephen Assemani.
