= Yola Cain =

Jamaican aviator (1954–2000)

- Born: 1954; Colony of Jamaica, British Empire
- Died: 17 May 2000 (aged 45–46); California, United States
- Known for: First Jamaican-born woman to receive a pilot's licence
- Aviation career
- Flight license: 1975
- Air force: Jamaica Defence Force
- Rank: Lieutenant

Yola Cain (1954 – 17 May 2000) was the first Jamaican born woman to gain a commercial and flight instructor licence and the first woman to fly in the JDF, the Jamaica Defence Force.

== Early life ==
Cain, born in Jamaica in 1954, was the second eldest of four siblings. Cain's father had a career in automobiles. As a teenager Cain was confident and gregarious, her sister, Judy Lee, recounts how she was an 'adventurer from a child' who 'everybody' in Kingston, Jamaica knew.

== Piloting career ==
Cain discovered her love for flying at age 19-20, however, during a period of white elitism within Jamaica, women were not flying. Cain, however, persevered and in 1975 gained her commercial flight instructor licence. Cain was not the first woman licensed in Jamaica, in 1952 an American, Earsley Barnett, received the first pilot licence granted to a woman in Jamaica; Cain was the first Jamaican born woman to receive a licence. Cain worked as a charter pilot for Jamaica Air Taxi (JAT) - having started the job before March 1976. Soon after, JAT became part of Trans Jamaican Airlines (TJA), established around July 1975. On 11 August 1976, Cain was among the first women enlisted in the JDF, alongside five others Cain was also considered to be a potential officer. Cain joined the JDF Airwing (fixed) as a 2/Lt on 22 May 1978. Cain became the first woman pilot of the JDF, Cain was presented with her wings alongside one other male officer of the JDF, Lt. Commander John McFarlane by the Governor General. Cain consistently flew for the JDF in the late 1970s and 1980s.

== Later life and death ==
Cain emigrated to the US in 1985, where she worked at the Universal Studios Hollywood theme park as a part-time cashier. She later became a director of operations for Universal Studios Theme Parks where she was in charge of 200-300 people. Cain died on 17 May 2000 of breast cancer, over 200 people attended Cain's funeral and the family received messages and condolences from as far afield as Japan. Cain had two daughters.

== Legacy ==
Cain is remembered for a number of reasons. Firstly, her contributions to female empowerment within Jamaica, Cain's brother reportedly described that 'if you gave a boy something to do Yola would do it', this attitude was particularly significant in mid twentieth century Jamaica. Cain's legacy has inspired other women within Jamaica to pursue careers in flight, by 1990 7 other women had followed Cain to become commercial pilots and 371 women had trained to be pilots, including Maria Ziadie-Haddad, the first female commercial pilot hired by Air Jamaica.

Secondly, of note, was Cain's passion for Jamaica, Cain's sister, Judy Lee, described how she provided her with the training to be a Jamaican describing her passion for Jamaica as 'unparalleled', reportedly Cain's grandmother described how 'Yola wanted to be Prime Minister of Jamaica'. Cain's Catholicism and her faith in God combined with her love for her country meant that she frequently gave back to Jamaican community especially as an alpha alumna.

Cain has frequently been honoured after her death in Jamaica, for example, during celebrations of Jamaica's 50 years of independence she was remembered as a woman who represented 'Jamaican culture' and in December 2011 the Jamaican Civil Aviation Authority recognised her contribution to flight.

Judy Lee Chen, Cain's sister, is currently writing a biography of Cain entitled The Flight of Life.
