= Giuseppe Luigi Assemani =

Lebanese Catholic priest, orientalist, and professor

Giuseppe Luigi Assemani (1710 on Mount Lebanon Tripoli – February 9, 1782 in Rome) was a Lebanese Catholic priest, an orientalist and a Professor of Oriental languages in Rome.

Assemani came from a well known family of Lebanese Maronites that included several notable Orientalists. His uncle was Archbishop Giuseppe Simone Assemani whom he helped with his writings; besides assisting his uncle he also studied in Rome and was appointed by the Pope, firstly as the Professor of Syriac at the Sapienza and later as the Professor of liturgy by Pope Benedict XIV. The Pope also made Assemani a member of the Academy for Historic Research which had just been established.

Assemani and his uncle between them laid the foundations of modern historical research with their work on publishing the correct editions of various early and Middle Age writers as well as their work on the decrees of the various general, national, and provincial councils. They were also influential by the examples they set in their own works on how historical materials should be used.

== Major works ==
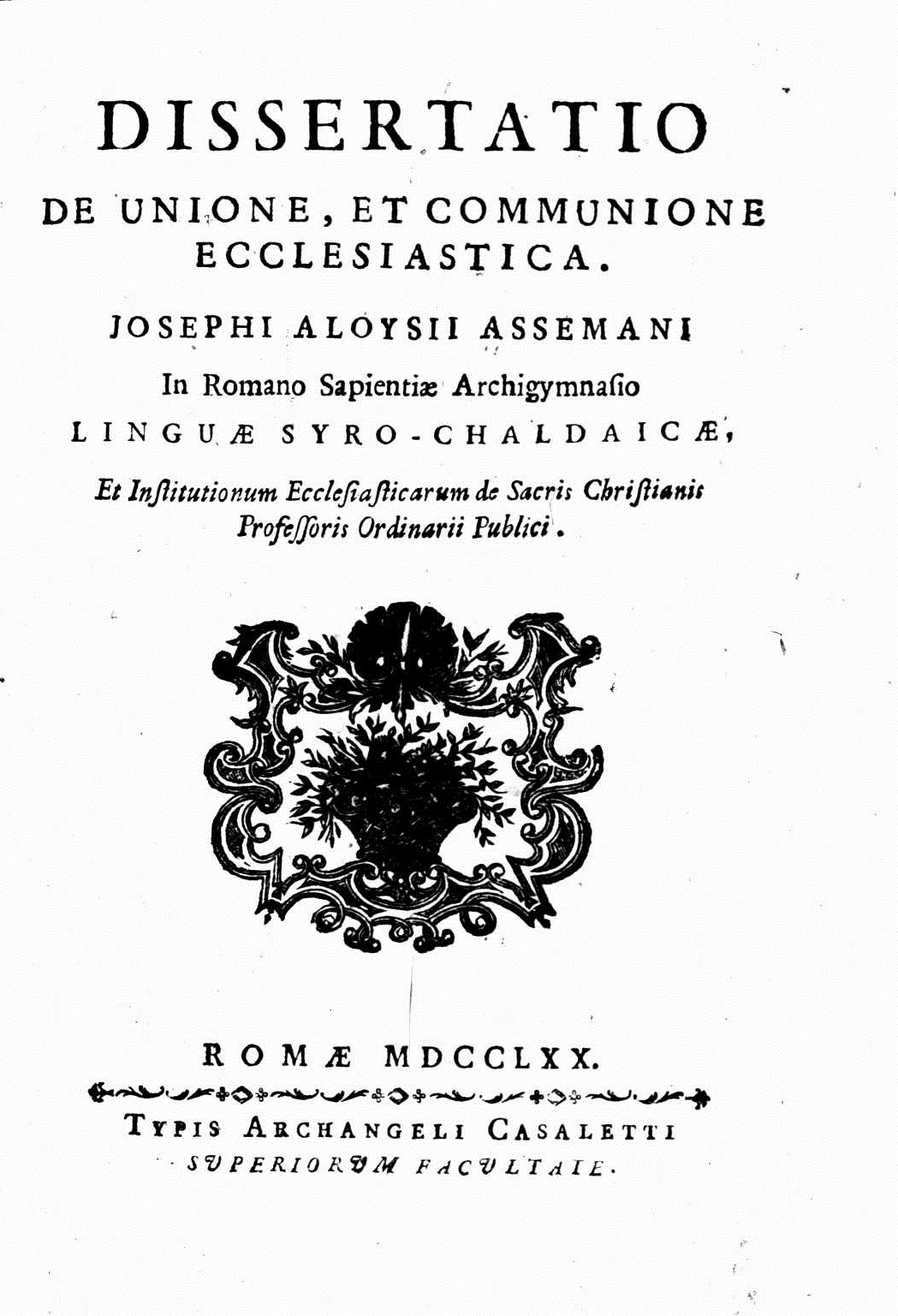
Dissertatio de unione, et communione ecclesiastica, 1770

- Codex liturgicus ecclesiae universae / Joseph Aloysius Assemanus ... recensuit, latine vertit, Praefationibus, Commentariis, et variantibus Lectionibus illustravit. Rom 1749-66, 13 Vols.
- Missale Alexandrinum Sancti in quo eucharistiae liturgiae omnes antiquae ac recentes ecclesiarum Aegypti, Graece, Coptice, Arabice, et Syriace exhibentur. Rome 1754.
  - Reprint, Editor Hubert Welter, Paris 19XX.
- Commentarius theologico-canonico-criticus de ecclesiis earum reverentia, et asylo atque concordia sacerdotii et imperii. Rom 1766.
- De Sacris ritibus Dissertatio. Rome 1757.
- Commentarius theologico-canonicus criticus de ecclesiis, earum reverentia et asylo atque concordia Sacerdotii et Imperii. Rome 1766.
- Dissertatio de unione et communione ecclesiastica. Rome 1770.
- Dissertatio de canonibus poenitentialibus. Rome 1770.
- De catholicis seu patriarchis Chaldaeorum et Nestorianorum commentarius historico-chronologicus. Rome 1775.This work remains the major reference work on the history of the Patriarchs of the Church of the East.
  - Reprint Westmead [etc.] : Gregg International Publ., 1969.
- De Synodo Diocesana Dissertatio. Rome 1776.
- A Latin version of Ebedjesus's Collectio Canonum published by Cardinal Mai in his Scriptorum Veterum Nova Collectio

== Other family members ==
- Archbishop Giuseppe Simone Assemani (Uncle)
- Stefano Evodio Assemani (1709–1782) (Brother)
- Simone Assemani (1752–1820) (Nephew)
