= Salim Karam =

Lebanese politician (born 1946)

Salim Bey Karam سليم بك كرم
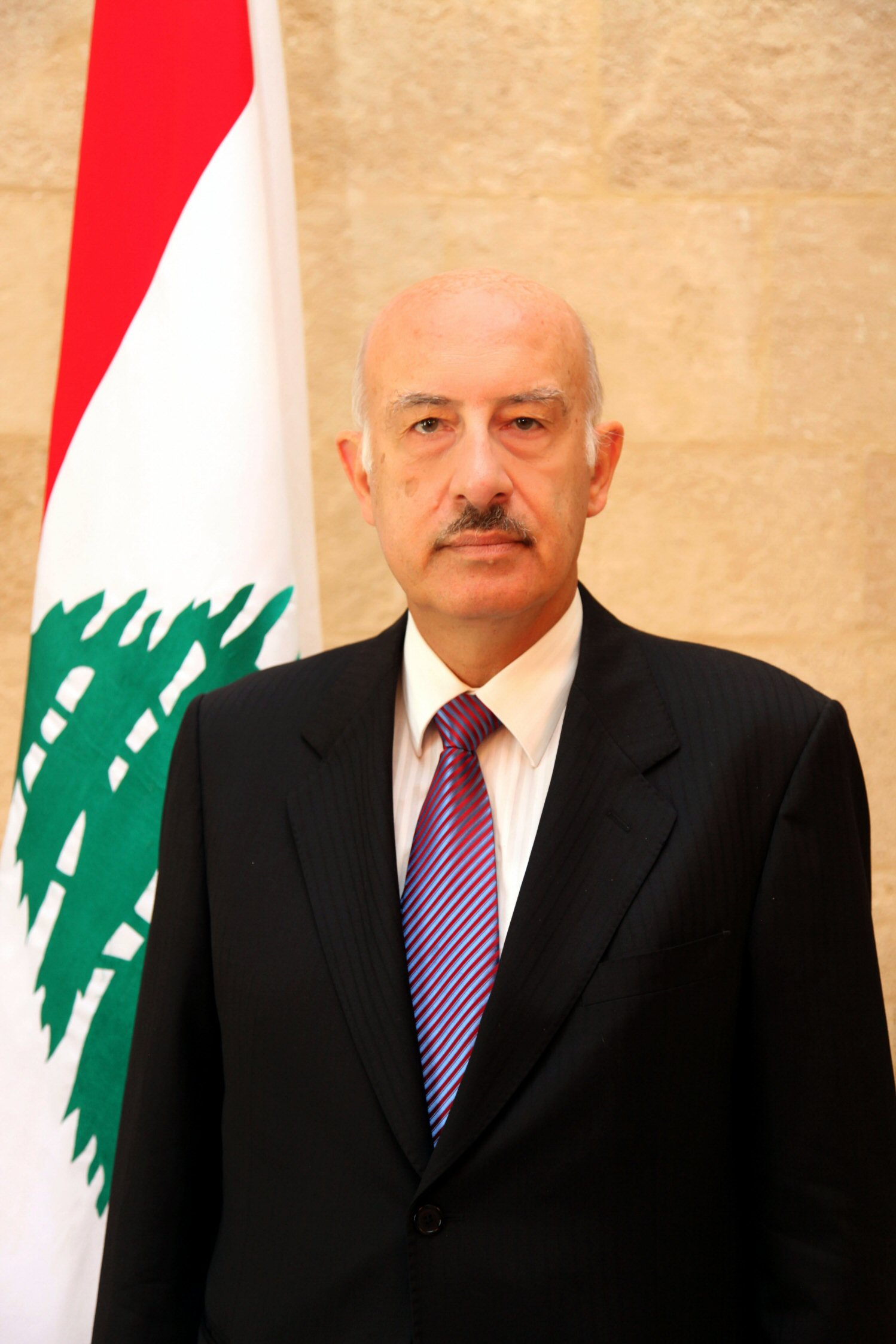

Member of the Parliament of the Republic of Lebanon
- In office 7 June 2009 – 21 May 2018
- Prime Minister: See list: Saad Hariri (2009-2011); Najib Mikati (2011-2014); Tammam Salam

Minister of State in Lebanese government
- In office 13 June 2011 – 15 February 2014
- Prime Minister: Najib Mikati

Personal details
- Born: May 21, 1946 (age 80) Zgharta, Lebanon
- Spouse: Marina Nabih Chammas
- Relations: Youssef Salim Karam (father)
- Children: Rita, Christina
- Education: American University of Beirut

Salim Bey Karam (Arabic: سليم بك كرم, romanized: Salīm Bik Karam; born on May 21, 1946) was a Minister of State in the Lebanese government. He was a Member of the 2009-2017 Parliament for the Maronite seat of Zgharta in North Lebanon.

== Early life and education ==
Salim Bey Karam was born in Zgharta on May 21, 1946. He is the fourth son of politician and former MP Youssef Salim Karam. His mother was Mariette Tarabay. His father was a Member of Parliament during (1943-1947), (1947-1953), (1960-1964). His grandfather, Salim Bey Mikhael Bey Karam, was District Governor of Ehden (1898-1900).

He is a direct descendant of a brother of the famous national Lebanese hero Youssef Bey Karam.

Karam was educated at De La Salle School in Tripoli and International College of Beirut. He went to American University of Beirut, graduating with a Business Degree. He has had a career in commerce and agriculture.

== Political career ==
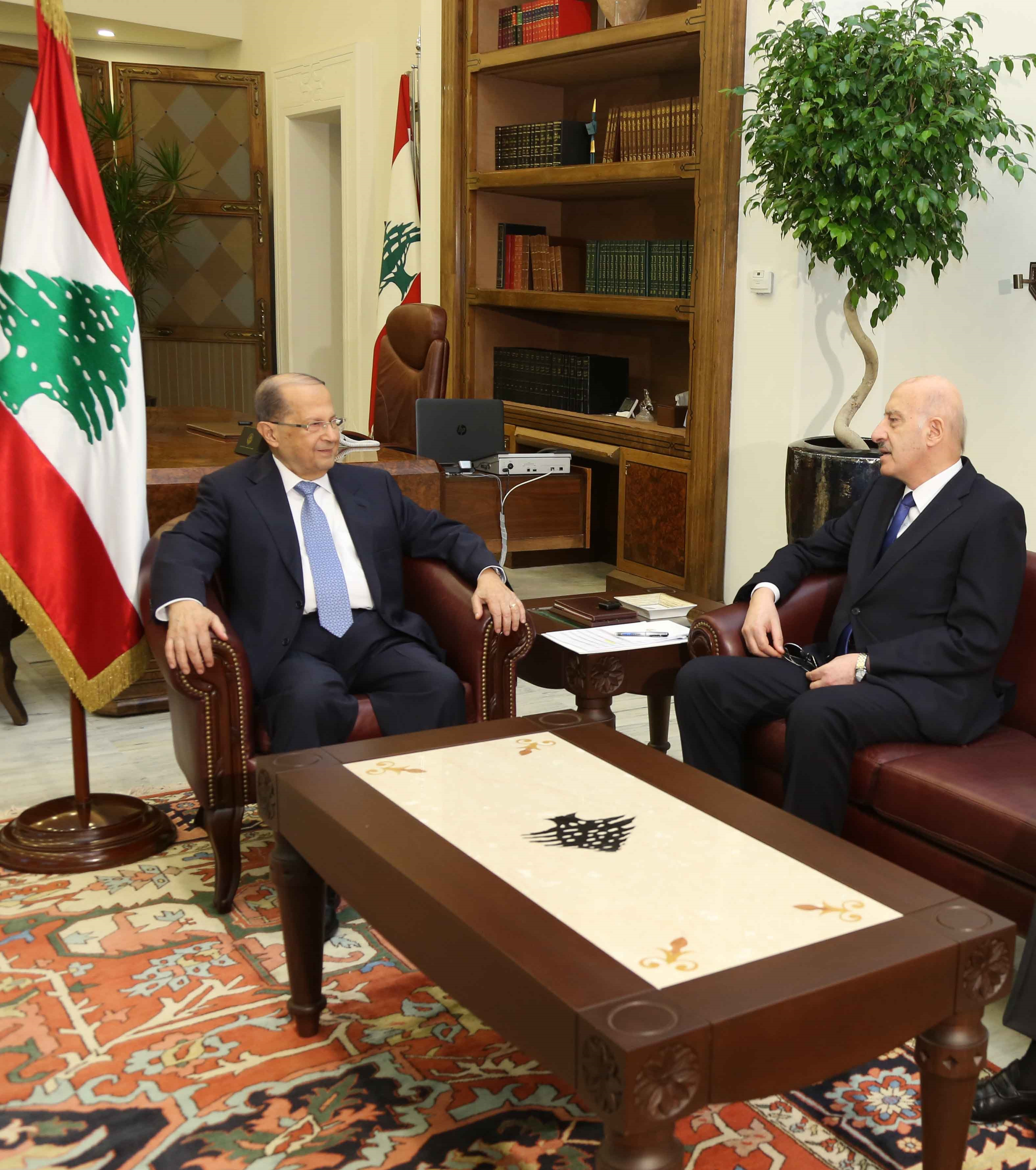
Salim Karam with President Michel Aoun

Salim Karam has been the leader of the Karam Family League since 1973 after the step down of his older brother Assaad Bey (after 1972 Parliamentary Elections). He was a member of the High Political Leadership Council of Zgharta during 1975-76 Lebanese Civil War.

He was staunchly opposed to the Syrian occupation of Lebanon in the 1990s; however, today with the withdrawal of Syrian Armies from Lebanon he supports equal bi-lateral relations with Syria with the strict condition Syria does not interfere in Lebanese politics.

Karam was a candidate in the General Elections of 1996, 2000 and 2005 and boycotted the 1992 elections in line with the wishes of General Michel Aoun.

During the Lebanese Parliamentary Elections of June 7, 2009, Salim Bey Karam was elected for the 1st time as a Member of Parliament for the Maronite seat of Zgharta-Zawyieh. He won the seat along with his two running partners Suleiman Frangieh, Jr and Estephan El Douaihy.

He was appointed minister of state in June 2011. He is part of the March 8 coalition and the Change and Reform bloc in Najib Mikati's cabinet.

== Personal life ==
Karam married in 1975 Marina Nabih Chammas and they have two daughters, Rita and Christina.

== See also ==
- Youssef Bey Karam
- Youssef Salim Karam
- Ehden
- Zgharta
