= Ziadi =

Ziadi is a surname. Notable people with the surname include:

- Fateh Ziadi (born 1976), Algerian sport shooter
- Mehdi Ziadi (born 1969), Moroccan tennis player
- Rekia Ziadi (born 1986), Algerian handball player
- Zied Ziadi (born 1990), Tunisian footballer
