= Ziadie family =

Jamaican Family

The Ziadie family is a Maronite family residing in Jamaica, where they were prominent merchants. A branch of the family now resides in the United States and its members have become successful horse trainers.

== History ==
Members of the Ziadie family are the descendants of brothers who emigrated from Lebanon. Lady Colin Campbell, previously Georgia Ziadie, is descended from this family through her father, department store owner Michael George Ziadie. She claims that the Ziadies are a wealthy and well-known family in Jamaica. The opera director Sir Peter Jonas was her cousin.

By 1969, the family's alleged eminence had waned, with only one person of the name, dry goods merchant Edward George Ziadie, appearing in that year's Who's Who in Jamaica, detailing the "Careers of Principal Public Men and Women of Jamaica", alongside an advertisement for a real estate company, "Victor Ziadie Realty".

== See also ==
- Ziade – Family name
- Maria Ziadie-Haddad – Aviator
