= Zgharta =

City in North Governorate, Lebanon

Zgharta زغرتا Zghorta, Zgharta-Ehden (municipality)
- City
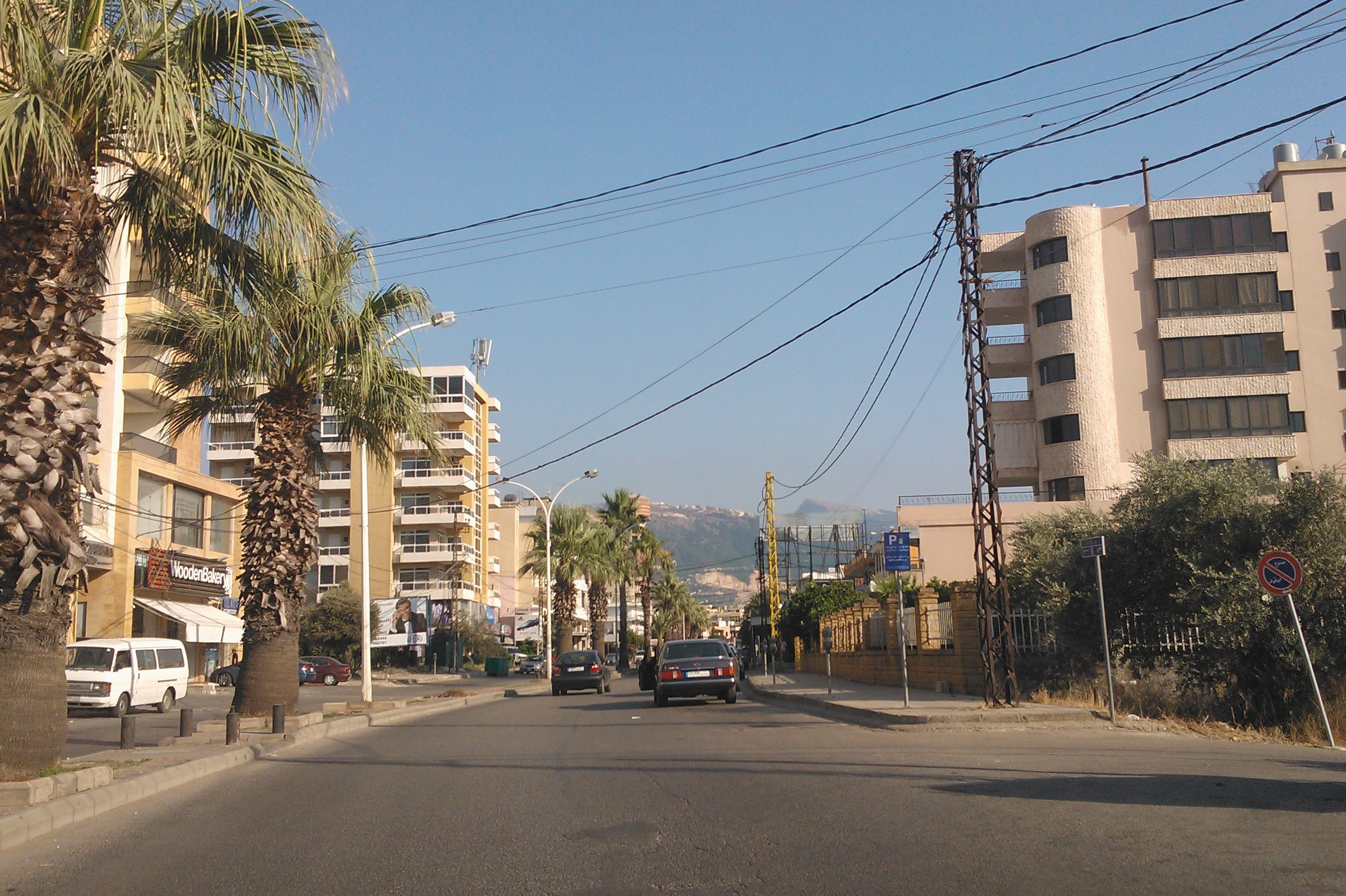
- Aerial view of main street in Zgharta (Tripoli-Zgharta Road)

- Location in Lebanon
- Coordinates: 34°24′N 35°54′E
- Country: Lebanon
- Governorate: North Governorate
- District: Zgharta District

Government
  - Mayor: Pierrot Douaihy

Area
  - Urban: 1.0 sq mi (2.6 km^{2})
- Elevation: 390–560 ft (120–170 m)

Population
  - City: ~30,000
  - Metro: ~40,000 (incl. city)
- Demonym(s): Zghartawi (local), Zghortiote, Zghortan, Zghartaouis
- Time zone: UTC+2 (EET)
  - Summer (DST): +3
- Area code: +961 6

Zgharta (Arabic: زغرتا, romanized: Zghartā, Classical Syriac: ܙܓܪܬܐ), also spelled as Zghorta, is a city in North Lebanon, with an estimated population of around 50,000. It is the second biggest city in Northern Lebanon after Tripoli. Zgharta is officially the Zgharta-Ehden municipality.

Zgharta is about 150 metres above sea level and lies between the rivers of Jouit and Rashein. It is 23 kilometres from Ehden, 11 kilometres from the coastal city of Tripoli, 88.7 kilometres from the capital of Lebanon, Beirut, and 82 kilometres from the nearest Syrian city, Tartous. Its history and people are closely associated with the village of Ehden, a summer resort and touristic center. Most of the citizens of Zgharta have summer houses in Ehden.

It is the seat and the capital of the Zgharta District (Qadaa' Zgharta). Zgharta is closely related to the mountain town of Ehden, essentially sharing the same population. Each summer, most of the people in Zgharta move to spend their summer in Ehden; this is reversed in winter when Ehden is practically deserted.

Zgharta had two Presidents of Lebanon: Suleiman Frangieh and René Moawad, and many prominent politicians: Youssef Salim Karam, Hamid Frangieh, historian Jawad Boulos Makary, Semaan El Douaihy, Suleiman Frangieh Jr, Nayla Moawad, Estephan El Douaihy (ex-MP), Salim Bey Karam, Tony Frangieh (current MP), Jawad Boulos, Michel Moawad (current MP) and Youssef Bahha El Douaihy. Ehden also produced at least four patriarchs of the Maronite Church – Gregorios Of Ehden, David Of Ehden, Jeremiah of Amshit (1199-1230), Youhanna Makhlouf (1609-1633), George Omaira (1634-1644), Estephan El Douaihy (1670-1704) – and an Ottoman era nationalist leader Youssef Bey Karam who led a rebellion against Turkish rule. Political power in Zgharta district is dominated by a few rival families from the town: the Karam, Frangieh, Douaihy, Moawad and Makary.

Traditionally, agriculture was a large portion of the local economy, with olives grown for olive-oil around Zgharta and apple orchards around Ehden. Recently, the service (especially tourism and leisure) and manufacturing sectors have seen significant growth.

== Etymology ==
Various explanations have been given as to the meaning of Zgharta. The majority are of the opinion that it relates to meanings relating to fortresses, citadels, barricades and the like. One writer has suggested that it derived from the Aramaic word "zaghar" meaning fortress.

== History ==
=== Ancient history ===
The Plain of Zgharta around Zgharta was likely inhabited from at least the beginning of the Neolithic Revolution by the Qaraoun culture as evidenced by some large, heavy Neolithic flints and double-headed axes found in the area that are documented by R. Wetzel and J. Haller in 1945.

There is some evidence that the area of Zgharta was later inhabited in 200 BC and that in the 2nd and 3rd centuries there were already fortifications. Its present-day existence and its close association with the village of Ehden began in the 16th century.

=== The founding of modern Zgharta ===
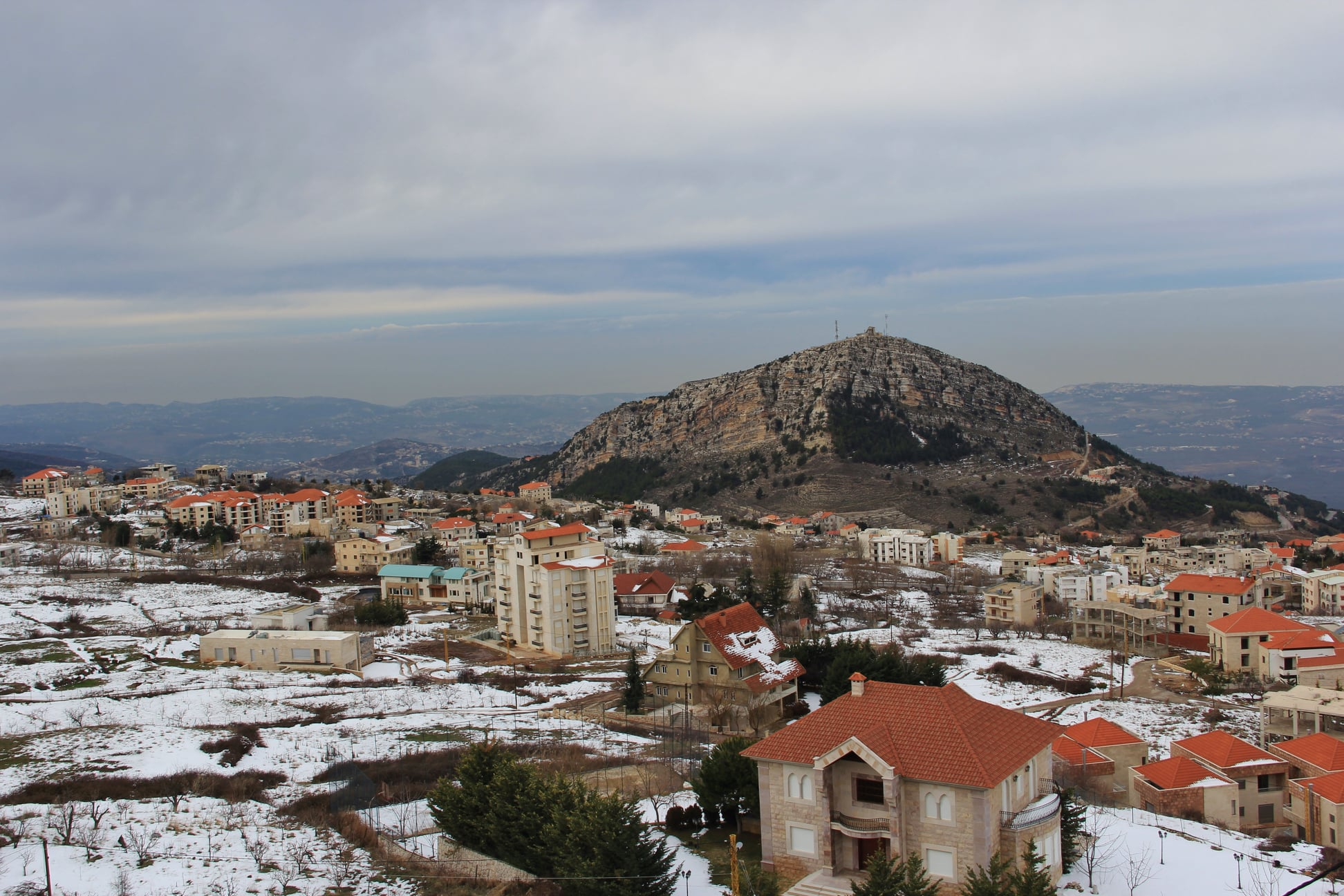
Ehden in winter (Zgharta district)

The story of that beginning is recorded in a manuscript in the Syriac language, which belonged to Romanos Afandi Yammine, son of Father George Yammine, and is now held by his grandson Youssef Boutros Romanos Yammine. It describes how people of Ehden had acquired "the farmland of Zgharta":

On the eve of the 24th of January 1515, Al-Ghazali, the governor of Damascus, along with Sinan Pasha, the minister of Sultan Selim I, had reached Ehden travelling along the route of Damascus-Bekaa Valley-Dahr al-Kadib-the cedars. They were transporting funds to Sultan Salim I who was in Egypt. They were welcomed as guests by Sheikh Iskandar, whilst other members of their travelling entourage were guests of the people of Ehden. Heavy snowfall and extremely freezing conditions that lasted two full days prompted them to stay five days in Ehden where Sheikh Iskandar and Bishop Keryakos Douaihy, the local bishop, provided for their guests great hospitality, generosity and kindness. Responding to a request by their guests, the people of Ehden endeavoured to clear the heavy snow off the road as far as Hayrouna Valley overlooking the coast, accompanying their guests to safety where they made their farewells to them with fitting accolades.

In April 1516, Bishop El Douaihy and Sheikh Iskandar received a letter from Al-Ghazali, saying on being told by his minister, Sinan Pasha of their and peoples hospitality and assistance, Sultan Salim I asked that he rewarded them which he promised the Sultan he would. On his return to Damascus, Al-Ghazali invited the people of Ehden to meet him in Tripoli. At the request of Sheikh Iskander he agreed to provide the people with a place to live away from the harsh winter conditions, which they faced in Ehden. Al-Ghazali readily agreed to this request. Accompanied by his officials, Sheikh Iskandar went with Bishop El Douaihy to choose a suitable place in the Al-Zawiyi region. They chose a derelict farm, containing a few demolished houses and a tower in the middle, situated between the rivers Joueit and Rashein. Al-Ghazali, on the return of his officials with the measurements of the site, promised to obtain a "Shahani firman" (decree) from Sultan Salim whereby ownership of the land would pass to the people of Ehden.

Some eight months later, in 1517, the "Shahani firman" was granted, but it was addressed to Sheikh Iskandar. Having collected the firman in Damascus and returning to Ehden the people there were aggrieved that the firman was addressed solely to Sheikh Iskandar, fearing that he and his relations could claim sole ownership. Bishop El Douaihy, representing the people, put this to Sheikh Iskandar and as a result he declared at the Mar Mama church that the given land known as "Zgharta would be distributed equally between the people of Ehden".

=== Later history ===
In 1602, Father Ghodar, a Jesuit priest to Zgharta recorded: "Zgharta represents a horrific nightmare for its enemy. Its youth is dressed in traditional clothing; white shirts decorated with yellow stitched embroidery, strongly tied "sherwal" pants along with long boots and topped by headband reflecting enormous heroism. Zgharta is a small village surrounded by an enclosure, and has a fortress beside the church of Virgin Mary. Zgharta used to be a drawn line between danger and worship, situated between Tripoli and the mountain. It would receive initial attacking strikes, then reply by returning those strikes, hitting the hearts of their enemy. Its people have therefore been renowned and recognised as excellent fighters"

Another later visitor in 1831 records that "From Tripoli I left for Zgharta, which is two hours away. Its land is full of olive, mulberry, vines, apricot and lemon trees"

The town of Zgharta was divided into five sectors in 1932: Saydeh Sharki (the area to the east side of Notre-Dame of Zgharta church), Saydeh Gherbi (west of the Church), Slayeb Shemali (northern side of the crossroads), Slayeb Janoubi (southern side of the crossroads) and Maaser. To be a citizen of Zgharta, one is to be registered in one of these five sectors.

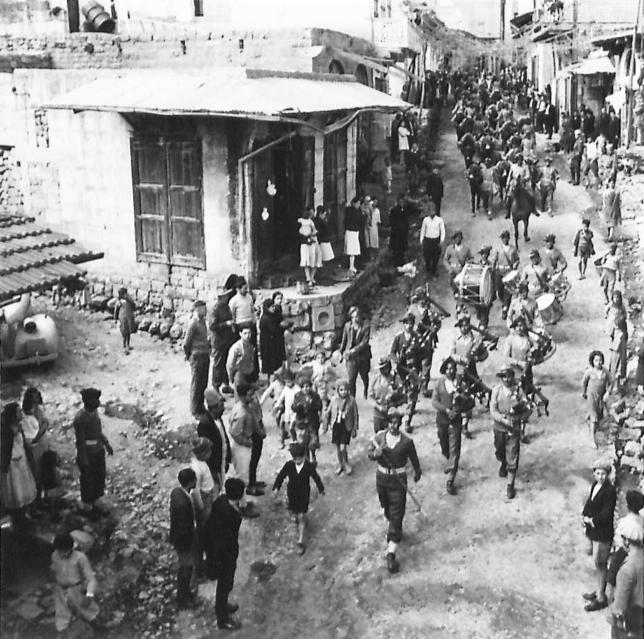
Indian troops in Zgharta 1942

=== Accent ===
Zghartaouis are instantly recognizable by their distinct accent. Zgharta, whose general population did not speak Arabic until the end of the 19th century, transferred some of the Syriac terminology as well as signs of movement and incorporated them into the Arabic language that they now speak due to the necessity of communicating with the rest of the residents of Mount Lebanon and its coast and those who abandoned this language. At the beginning of the twentieth century, the Saint Joseph School in Zgharta attested to this and the other schools in Ehden, which taught the Syriac language in addition to the Arabic and French languages. The prayers and Masses were held in Syriac and Arabic, before they gradually disappeared even among those in charge of the Maronite Church, who lost the books of Maronite prayers and Masses from its Syriac language until it became restricted to schools and seminaries and theological institutes. Residents of some villages in Mount Lebanon still speak Arabic with a Syriac accent, clinging to it and maintaining it because it is synonymous with their identity.

== Economy ==
The main economy of Zgharta relies on agriculture, mainly through its surrounding villages through the sale of fruits of vegetables but most importantly through the production of olives and olive oil, which are exported.

Tourism also plays a big role in the city's economy, however this is mainly derived from tourism in Ehden, as Zgharta does not see many tourists.

Zgharta also has a small industrial sector, mainly through a couple of concrete plants and other industrial manufacturers.

== Climate ==
The climate is hot-summer Mediterranean (Csa in the Köppen climate classification), with very wet winters and very dry summers. About 1,053 mm (41.46 in) of precipitation falls annually.

Climate data for Zgharta
Month	Jan	Feb	Mar	Apr	May	Jun	Jul	Aug	Sep	Oct	Nov	Dec	Year
Mean daily maximum °C (°F)	12.1 (53.8)	12.7 (54.9)	15.4 (59.7)	20.1 (68.2)	24.5 (76.1)	28.2 (82.8)	30.2 (86.4)	30.7 (87.3)	28.3 (82.9)	24.8 (76.6)	19.3 (66.7)	14.6 (58.3)	21.7 (71.1)
Mean daily minimum °C (°F)	4.1 (39.4)	4.6 (40.3)	6.2 (43.2)	9.2 (48.6)	12.7 (54.9)	15.9 (60.6)	17.7 (63.9)	18.4 (65.1)	16.1 (61.0)	13.4 (56.1)	9.6 (49.3)	6.1 (43.0)	11.2 (52.1)
Average precipitation mm (inches)	234 (9.2)	187 (7.4)	164 (6.5)	73 (2.9)	29 (1.1)	2 (0.1)	1 (0.0)	2 (0.1)	11 (0.4)	43 (1.7)	112 (4.4)	195 (7.7)	1,053 (41.5)
Source: Climate-Data.org, Climate data

== Geography ==
Zgharta is situated at an altitude of around 120 m above sea level. The main and old city of Zgharta is situated between the two rivers of Rachiine and Jouit which merge forming the Abu Ali River which then passes through the city of Tripoli.

Zgharta is situated at the steps of the Northern Mount Lebanon range in a not-too-hilly but very fertile agricultural area, mainly due to the rivers that flow through it. Olives, citrus fruits and lettuce were the main and historical crops grown in the area for centuries. Today, a variety of crops are grown: avocados, strawberries, kale, cabbage being the most popular.

== Demographics ==
Religion in Zgharta (2014)
Religion	Percent
Christian	98.59%
Others	1.41%

In 2014, Christians made up 98.59% of registered voters in Zgharta. 91.79% of the voters were Maronite Catholics.

Most people living in Zgharta are from the local Zghartawi families, but in the last 20 years, many Christians, mainly Maronites, originally from Danniyeh and Akkar have moved to Zgharta, and are settled in Mejdlaya and Kfarhata.

== Notable people ==
- Istifan al-Duwayhi
- Tony Frangieh
- Tony Frangieh Jr.
- Hamid Frangieh
- Michael Cheika
- Suleiman Frangieh
- Samir Frangieh
- Youssef Barakat
- Adam Doueihi
- Antoine Al Douaihy (born 1999), footballer
- Thomas George (Australian politician)
- Suleiman Frangieh
- Odette Kaddo
- Frangieh family
- Youssef Bey Karam
- Youssef Salim Karam
- Salim Bey Karam
- Marie al-Khazen
- Michel Moawad
- Rene Mouawad
- Jean Obeid
- John Symond

== See also ==
- Gigarta – Ancient settlement in North Lebanon
- Ehden – City in Zgharta District, Lebanon
