= Youssef Salim Karam =

Lebanese politician (1910–1972)

Youssef Bey Salim Bey Karam يُوسُف بِك سَلِيم بِك كَرَم
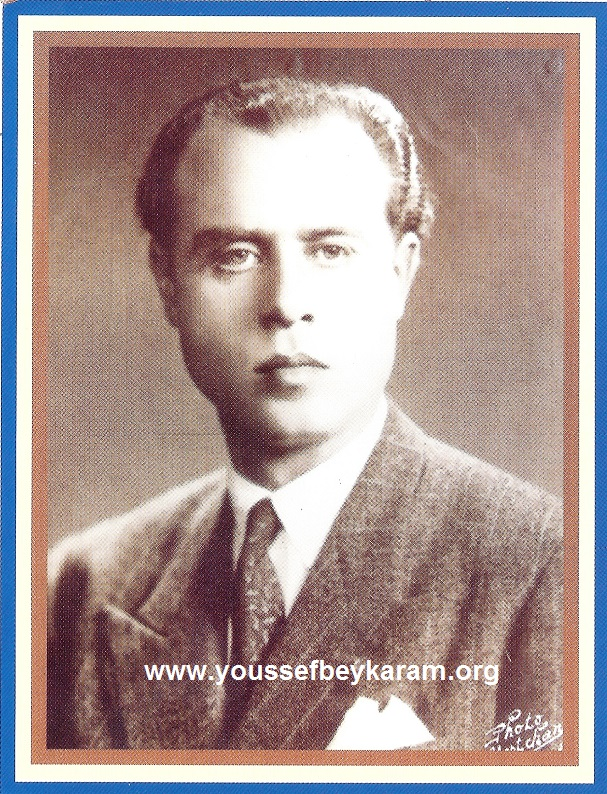

Member of the Parliament of the Republic of Lebanon
- In office 21 September 1943 – 7 April 1947
- In office 25 May 1947 – 20 March 1951
- In office 5 June 1951 – 3 May 1953
- In office 18 July 1960 – 8 May 1964

Personal details
- Born: April 5, 1910 Zgharta, Lebanon
- Died: February 3, 1972 (aged 61) Jounieh, Lebanon
- Resting place: Ehden, Lebanon
- Spouse: Mariette Tarabay
- Children: Maxime; Assaad Bey; Nayla; Salim Bey

Youssef Bey Salim Bey Karam (Arabic: يُوسُف سَلِيم كَرَم, romanized: Yūsuf Sālīm Karam; April 5, 1910 – February 3, 1972) was a Lebanese member of the Parliament of Lebanon.

== Early life ==
Youssef was born in Ehden Lebanon, the son of Salim Bey Karam and Jamilee Melhem Assaad Boulos. The family had a long history of public service, his father, a District Governor (1898-1900); his grandfather Mikhael Bey is the brother of famous National Hero Youssef Bey Karam; his uncle Assaad Bey a District Governor (1874-1887).

He was educated at the Collège Stanislas de Paris.

== Political career ==
Youssef Salim Karam was elected as a Member of Parliament for the first time in 1943 following the death of MP Wahib Geagea from the town of Bsharri, winning the North Lebanon Governorate seat ahead of Hasib Geagea, brother of the deceased MP. He was subsequently elected for three successive terms in 1943, 1947 and 1951.

During the General Elections of 1947, Youssef Salim Karam was re-elected for a second time for the North Lebanon Governorate seat along with his running partner Hamid Frangieh.

Karam was elected for the third time in a row in 1951, making a strong showing by winning, along with his running partners, 5 out of the 6 North Lebanon Governorate seats. Karam's list included Philippe Najib Boulos from the Koura District, Camille Akl (Batroun), Kabalan Issa el-Khoury (Bsharri), Antoine Estephan (Bsharri), and Fouad Douaihy (Zgharta). The latter lost the seat to Hamid Frangieh who was running the opposing list along with René Moawad (Zgharta), Nadra Issa el-Khoury (Bsharri), Habib Kairouz (Bsharri), Nicolas Ghosn (Koura District), and Youssef Daou (Batroun).

Youssef Salim Karam lost his seat in Zgharta-Zawyieh to Hamid Frangieh during the General Elections of 1953, both running in that election as independent candidates. Karam lost again during the General elections of 1957 to the opposing list in Zgharta-Zawyieh (Hamid Frangieh and René Moawad) along with his running partner, Father Semaan Douaihy.

However, Karam ran for the elections for the sixth time in a row in 1960, and was re-elected for the seat of Zgharta-Zawyieh with his running partners Suleiman Frangieh, who was back from Syria after he was granted amnesty following his involvement in the Miziara massacre, and René Moawad.

In 1964, Karam ran one last time for the elections as an independent candidate and lost against Suleiman Frangieh, René Moawad and Father Semaan Douaihy. During that time, Youssef Salim Karam was developing arteriosclerosis symptoms, and was officially diagnosed with it a year later.

Following his diagnosis with the arteriosclerosis disease at the age of 55 that left him with a severe physical weakness, Karam's political career ended.

His eldest son, Assaad, succeeded him and ran for the elections of 1968 and 1972 as an independent candidate. After the latter's step-down, Karam's second son, Salim, took over and ran for the elections in 1996, 2000, 2005, 2009 (in which he won), and 2018.

The only time since 1943 that none of Karam family members ran for the elections was during the Parliamentary Elections of 1992.

== Miziara massacre ==
On 16 June 1957, some of Karam's men went to see him in his home in Tripoli, informing him that a requiem mass was being held in Miziara, a village located in the south of Zgharta, for the repose of the soul of Salim el Abed who has died in Nigeria. They asked him if he wanted them to accompany him. However, Karam did not want to attend the mass. He allegedly said to his men : "I will not attend the requiem mass that is being held today, but out of respect for the people of Miziara, I shall go to Miziara tomorrow with two or three of you to pay my respect to the deceased man." Karam's men reacted to him wanting to be accompanied only by three men, but he insisted that the deceased man, Salim el Abed, used to back financially his political opponents; therefore, not having something that really links him to the deceased man other than respect, there is no use, according to Karam, to have a delegation in order to pay this visit.

Youssef Karam is known for taking firm decisions, and no one dared to defy him or question his decisions, so he eventually ended up not going to Miziara that day even though his men thought that it was better for him to go.

That same day, during the requiem mass that Karam decided not to attend, the Miziara massacre took place between the Frangieh and Douaihy clans. The Douaihy family clan was then led by Father Semaan Douaihy, who was the running partner of Youssef Karam in the elections that was going to take place at the end of June 1957, a few weeks after the massacre.

The same men who wanted Karam to attend the mass still recall how he firmly refused to go and they believe that his decision was instinctual.

== Personal life ==
In 1939, he married Mariette Tarabay, daughter of Fouad Mikhael Bey Tarabay from Tripoli, and they had four children together: Maxime, Nayla, Assaad, and Salim.

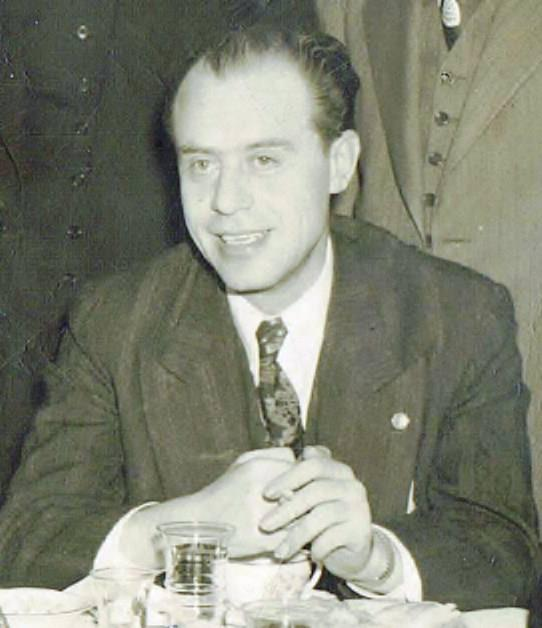
MP Youssef Bey Karam

== See also ==
- Youssef Bey Karam
- Salim Bey Karam
- List of political families in Lebanon
- Ehden
- Zgharta
