= Lady Colin Campbell =

British author, socialite and television personality (born 1949)

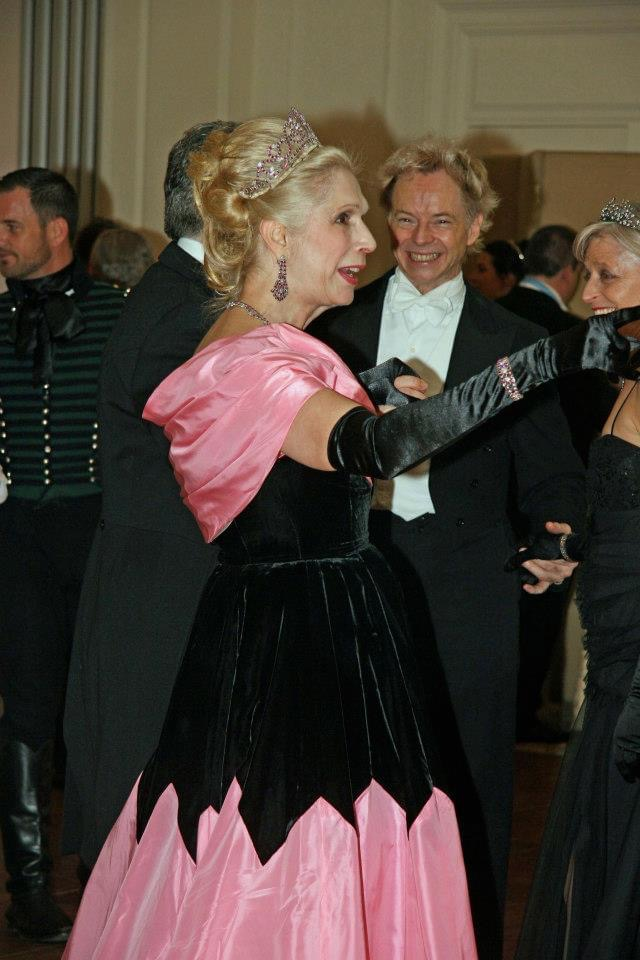
- Campbell in 2013
- Born: George William Ziadie; 17 August 1949 (age 77); St Andrew, Colony of Jamaica
- Other name: Georgia Arianna Ziadie
- Citizenship: United Kingdom; Jamaica
- Education: Fashion Institute of Technology
- Occupations: Author; socialite; television personality
- Spouse: Lord Colin Campbell (m. 1974; div. 1975)
- Children: 2 (adopted)
- Relatives: Sir Peter Jonas (cousin)
- Family: Ziadie (by birth); Clan Campbell (by marriage)

Georgia Arianna, Lady Colin Campbell (née Ziadie; born 17 August 1949), also known as Lady C, is a British Jamaican author, socialite, and television personality who has published seven unauthorised books about the British royal family. These include biographies of Diana, Princess of Wales (which was on The New York Times Best Seller list in 1992), of Queen Elizabeth the Queen Mother, and of Meghan, Duchess of Sussex and Prince Harry, Duke of Sussex.

Born into the Ziadie family, a prominent family of Lebanese descent, she grew up in the Colony of Jamaica as the child of a wealthy department store owner. Campbell was born with a genital malformation and, following the medical advice of that time, was raised as a boy despite being female. She moved to New York City to attend the Fashion Institute of Technology and began working as a model. In 1970 she had corrective surgery for her congenital vaginal malformation, funded by her grandmother. She legally changed her name from George William Ziadie to Georgia Arianna Ziadie, receiving a new birth certificate. While in the United States, she met and married Lord Colin Ivar Campbell, the second son of Ian Campbell, 11th Duke of Argyll and Louise Hollingsworth Morris Clews. The marriage quickly soured and they divorced fifteen months later following a scandal surrounding her physical characteristics at birth.

As well as being a royal biographer and a royal commentator, Campbell is a reality star who has made appearances on Comedy Nation, I'm a Celebrity...Get Me Out of Here!, Celebs Go Dating, Salvage Hunters, Through the Keyhole, Good Morning Britain, and Celebs on the Farm. She admits to liking the recognition.

Campbell is the châtelaine of Castle Goring in Worthing, the ancestral seat of the Shelley baronets of Castle Goring. She ventured into reality television to cover the castle's renovation costs, which she called "whoring for Goring". She purchased the mansion in 2013.

== Early life ==
Campbell was born in Jamaica on 17 August 1949 as George William Ziadie, one of four children of department store owner Michael George Ziadie and Gloria Dey (née Smedmore). She said in an interview that her father was a Russian count and that she is thus a Russian countess in her own right and has stated that her family descends from Charlemagne and William the Conqueror. Campbell is a cousin of opera director Sir Peter Jonas.

At birth, she had a genital malformation (fused labia and a deformed clitoris). Medical advice at the time was to assign her as a male so that she could live what was deemed a normal life, as that was thought to be "the superior sex" at the time. Though her family life was otherwise happy, Ziadie has since spoken and written of the many personal issues she faced being raised as a boy when she is biologically female.

Her family, the Ziadies, were prominent in Jamaica after emigrating from Lebanon, having grown wealthy from trade. Campbell moved from Jamaica to New York City to attend the Fashion Institute of Technology. She was not able to have the corrective surgery needed for her congenital vaginal malformation until 1970 when she was 21, when her grandmother discovered what had occurred and gave her the $5,000 she needed. At that time, Ziadie legally changed her name from George William Ziadie to Georgia Arianna Ziadie and received a new birth certificate. "No one ever faced the knife more eagerly than I. You would have thought I was going on a wonderful cruise – which, in a way, I suppose I was", Ziadie wrote in her autobiography. She had already started working as a model in New York City prior to her surgery. Besides modelling, she worked at Harrods, served as social secretary to the Libyan ambassador, and organised charity events.

== Marriage and family ==
On 23 March 1974, after having known him for only five days, she married Lord Colin Ivar Campbell, the younger son of the eleventh Duke of Argyll. She has said of him, "He had the strongest personality of anyone I had ever met – he simply exuded strength, decisiveness and charm." However, their relationship quickly soured. The couple split after nine months over the scandal surrounding her physical characteristics at birth, and divorced after 14 months. She successfully sued several publications that claimed she was born a boy and had subsequently undergone a sex change, and accused her former husband of selling the untrue story for money. Her stepmother-in-law was Margaret Campbell, Duchess of Argyll, who was friends with Dame Barbara Cartland.

In 1993, she adopted two Russian boys, Michael 'Misha' and Dimitri 'Dima', both of whom appeared on MTV's 2018 reality television show The Royal World, calling themselves "Count".

In 2013, she bought Castle Goring, a Grade I listed country house in Worthing, Sussex. The property is the ancestral family home of the poet Percy Bysshe Shelley (although he never lived there) and the former seat of the Shelley baronets of Castle Goring.

== Writing career ==
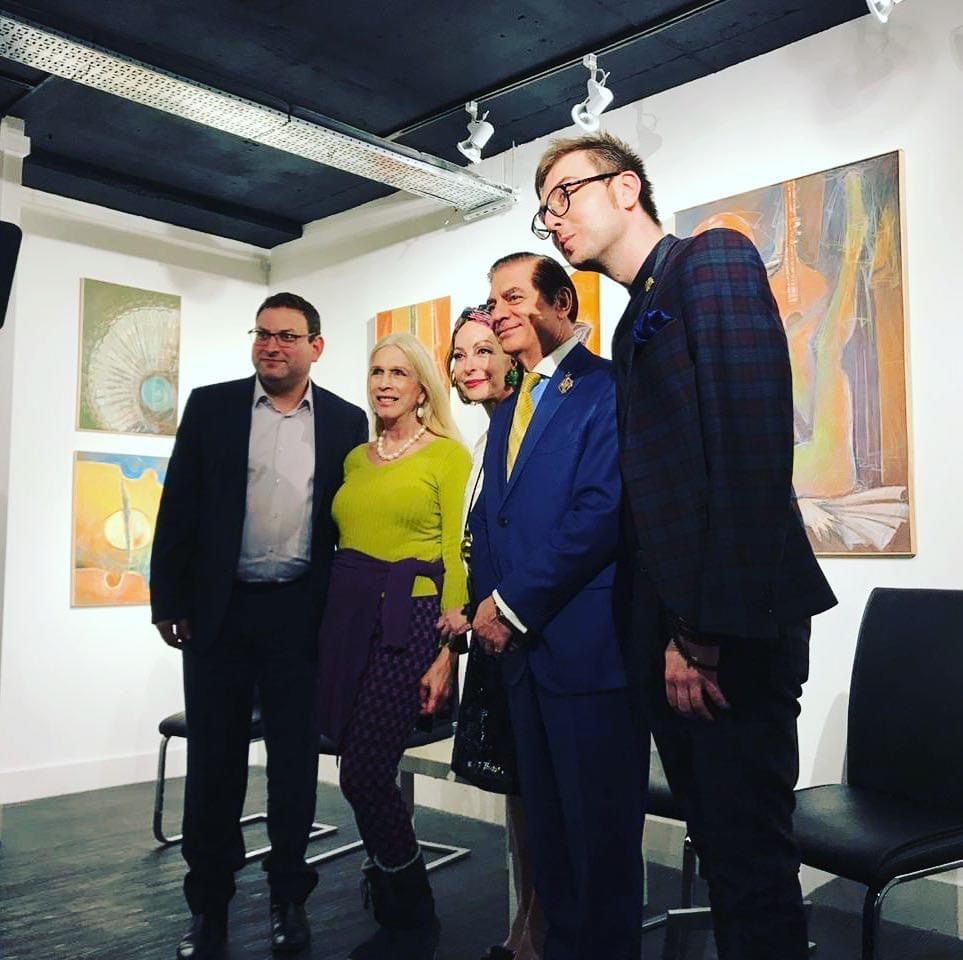
Campbell (second from left) at the London School of Business and Finance art panel in 2018

Campbell wrote special radio pantomimes for the BBC in 1982 and 1983, entitled Dick Whittington and Sleeping Beauty. She is best known for her books on Diana, Princess of Wales, and Queen Elizabeth the Queen Mother. Her 1992 book, Diana in Private: The Princess Nobody Knows, provided information about Diana's struggle with bulimia and her affair with James Hewitt (insights into these matters deriving from the fact that "one of [Campbell's] closest friends was one of [Diana's] closest friends"). Campbell was dismissed as a fantasist, but some of her claims were later vindicated. Diana in Private appeared on The New York Times Best Seller list in 1992. Campbell later said the book initially started as an authorised official biography but later Diana decided to make it an unofficial one and use it as a "get out of jail card" after being "advised by friends that she should play the victim." Her 1993 book, The Royal Marriages, was criticised by Lynn Barber for lack of verification for her assertions. Barber described her pleasure in encountering "an author so exhilaratingly untrammelled by any fear (or knowledge?) of the libel laws. Nothing is beyond her", concluding "either [Campbell] is the greatest gossip since Pepys or she is a complete fabulist: one can only read it and gawp ... Lady Colin Campbell never bothers her head with anything so tedious as verification".

Campbell's 2012 book, The Untold Life of Queen Elizabeth The Queen Mother, was met with criticism. Her theorising, including claims quoting the Duke of Windsor regarding the Queen Mother's parentage, was dismissed by writers Hugo Vickers and Michael Thornton as "bizarre" and "complete nonsense". The timing of the publication of Campbell's book, a service of remembrance for the Queen Mother marking the tenth anniversary of her death, was also condemned. In The Sunday Times, the journalist Lynn Barber opined that Campbell's claims ought not to be dismissed out of hand. In some subsequent interviews, Campbell put some distance between herself and a few of the theories first articulated in her book, including during a filmed conversation in a 2016 documentary with historian John Julius Norwich, who knew the Queen Mother when she was alive and challenged some of Lady Colin Campbell's claims.

In 2020, Campbell released another biography called Meghan and Harry: The Real Story, addressing Meghan and Prince Harry's life, romance and ensuing rift with the royal family. Julie Miller in Vanity Fair described the book as "aristocratic gossip", and labelled it as deeply subjective. Her other books include a book about her own mother titled Daughter of a Narcissus: A Family's Struggle to Survive their Mother's Narcissistic Personality Disorder, and a book about Queen Elizabeth II titled The Queen's Marriage. Campbell has been called a "polarizing figure" by Vanity Fair and an "amusing dinner partner" by Tina Brown.

== Television ==
Campbell appeared on Comedy Nation, a British TV show. In November 2015, she took part in the fifteenth TV series of I'm a Celebrity...Get Me Out of Here! The following month, she left the programme before its conclusion "on medical grounds" finishing in eighth place. In a later interview, Campbell said that she felt bullied into leaving the show by Tony Hadley and Duncan Bannatyne.

In 2016, she featured in a documentary entitled Lady C and the Castle, which was broadcast by ITV. The programme charted her journey in converting her dilapidated castle into a wedding venue.

In 2017, she appeared at the castle in an episode of Salvage Hunters on Quest. She also appeared on Through the Keyhole, where Keith Lemon toured Castle Goring.

In 2018, she appeared on the First Dates Celebrity Special for Stand Up To Cancer.

In August 2019, Campbell appeared on Celebs Go Dating, shown on E4. In November of that year she appeared on Good Morning Britain to defend Prince Andrew, Duke of York's associations with Jeffrey Epstein, who had been convicted of soliciting a 17-year-old female named Virginia Roberts for prostitution. She said that Epstein was not a paedophile but an ephebophile, and argued that there is a material difference between "a minor and a child" (no legal difference exists where Epstein was convicted). She reiterated this defence on the launch of GB News in June 2021. She subsequently sued the Daily Mirror after the newspaper accused her in an article of defending "Jeffrey Epstein's right to rape children". The case was later settled and the Mirror issued a public apology to Campbell.

In April 2020, she started her own YouTube channel and began filming her popular series, Chatting with Lady C, from Castle Goring; as of May 2026, the channel has gained over 200,000 subscribers and 100 million views.

In early 2021, she competed in the MTV series Celebs on the Farm.

In December 2025, Campbell appeared in the Netflix documentary, Murder in Monaco.

== Health ==
In late 2016, Campbell suffered from sepsis.

In October 2025, she was hospitalised after a fall and underwent surgery for a broken hip.

== Bibliography ==
- Campbell, Lady Colin (1986). Lady Colin Campbell's Guide to Being a Modern Lady. Heterodox. ISBN 9781851730025.
- Campbell, Lady Colin (1988). How to Master Any Social Situation. Eagle Publishing Corporation. ISBN 9780931933677.
- Campbell, Lady Colin (1992). Diana in Private: The Princess Nobody Knows. St. Martin's Press. ISBN 9780312081805.
- Campbell, Lady Colin (1993). The Royal Marriages: What Really Goes on in the Private World of the Queen and Her Family. St. Martin's Press. ISBN 9780312952792.
- Campbell, Lady Colin (1997). A Life Worth Living. Warner. ISBN 9780751516609. (Autobiography)
- Campbell, Lady Colin (1998). The Real Diana. Macmillan. ISBN 9780312193492.
- Campbell, Lady Colin (2005). Empress Bianca. Arcadia Books Limited. ISBN 9781900850902. (Withdrawn after legal threats from Lily Safra and subsequently reissued in 2008 with amendments)
- Campbell, Lady Colin (2009). Daughter of Narcissus: A Family's Struggle to Survive Their Mother's Narcissistic Personality Disorder. Dynasty Press, Limited. ISBN 9780955350733. (Autobiography, profile of her mother)
- (Dog), Tum Tum (2011). With Love from Pet Heaven by Tum Tum the Springer Spaniel. Dynasty. ISBN 9780955350795. (Ghostwritten by the author on behalf of her dog)
- Campbell, Lady Colin (2012). The Untold Life of Queen Elizabeth The Queen Mother. Dynasty Press. ISBN 9780956803818.
- Campbell, Lady Colin (2016). A Woman's Walks. Pushkin Press. ISBN 9781782273233.
- Campbell, Lady Colin (2018). The Queen's Marriage. Dynasty Press, Limited. ISBN 9781527209848.
- Campbell, Lady Colin (2019). People of Colour and The Royals. Dynasty Press. ISBN 9781916131705.
- Campbell, Lady Colin (2020). Meghann and Harry: The Real Story. Simon and Schuster. ISBN 9781643136752.
  - Campbell, Lady Colin (2024). Meghan and Harry: The Real Story: Persecutors or Victims. Dynasty Press. ISBN 9781916131781.
- Campbell, Lady Colin (2025). Rogue Royal. Dynasty Press, Limited. ISBN 9781036963507.
