= Simone Assemani =

Italian orientalist (1752–1821)

Simone Assemani (19 February 1752 – 7 April 1821) was an Italian orientalist and numismatist.

== Life ==
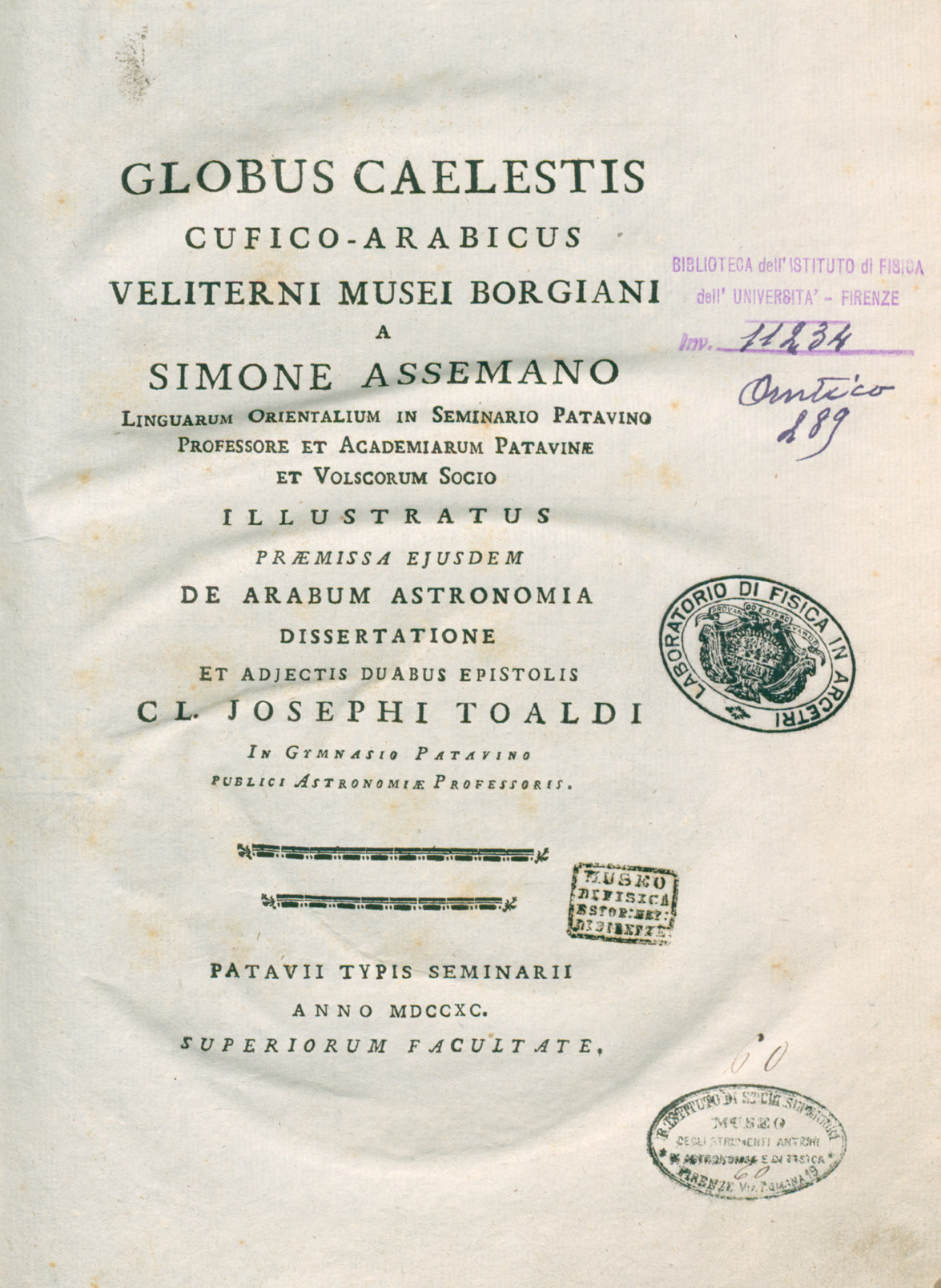
Globus caelestis Cufico-Arabicus Veliterni musei Borgiani, 1790

Assemani was born on 19 February 1752 in Rome. He was grand-nephew of Giuseppe Simone Assemani.

He was professor of Oriental languages at the University of Padua. He is best known by his masterly detection of the literary imposture of Giuseppe Vella, a Maltese priest, which claimed to be a history of the Saracens in Syria.

== Major works ==
=== Numismatics ===
- Museo Cufico Naniano / illustrato dall' Abate Simone Assemani. Padua 1787–88. Microfilm-Edition Urbana, Ill.: Univ. of Illinois 1998.
- Sopra le Monete Arabe effigiate. Padua 1809.
- Spiegazione di due rarissime medaglie cufiche della famiglia degli Ommiadi appartenenti al Museo Majnoni in Milano. Milan, 1818.

=== Orientalism ===
- Saggio sull'origine culto letteratura e costumi degli Arabi avanti Maometto. Padua 1787.
- Globus caelestis Cufico-Arabicus Veliterni musei Borgiani (in Latin). Padua: Tipografia del Seminario <Padova>. 1750.
- Catalogo De'Codici Manoscritti Orientali Della Bibliotheca Naniana / Compilato Dall' Abate Simone Assemani Professore Di Lingue Oriental. Padua 1792.
