= Edward J. Akar =

Sierra Leonean economist and lawyer

Edward J. Akar (born in Rotifunk, Sierra Leone) was a Sierra Leonean lawyer and former Sierra Leone's deputy finance minister. Akar had served as the president of the Sierra Leone Commercial Bank and chairman of the Sierra Leone national football team, known as the Leone Stars from 2000-2004. He is the younger brother (by eight years) of John Akar, who is one of Sierra Leone's most prominent people. John Akar wrote the music to Sierra Leone's National Anthem. Before his career as a lawyer, Edward Akar played football for Blackpool FC (before they changed their name to 'Mighty Blackpool'. He also played for the Sierra Leone national football team. His last match was around 1963, in a defeat to Guinea, in Conakry.
