= Stefano Evodio Assemani =

Catholic archbishop (1711–1782)

Stefano Evodio Assemani (15 April 1711 – 24 November 1782), Ottoman-born orientalist, nephew of Giuseppe Simone Assemani and cousin of Giuseppe Luigi Assemani, was the chief assistant of his uncle Giuseppe Simone in his work in the Vatican Library.

== Career ==
He was titular archbishop of Apamea in Syria, and held several rich prebends in Italy. His literary labours were very extensive. His two most important works were a description of certain valuable manuscripts in his Bibliothecae Mediceo-Laurentianae et Palatinae codd. manuscr. Orientalium Catalogus (Flor. 1742), fol., and his Acta SS. Martyrum Orientalium.

He made several translations from the Syriac, and in conjunction with his uncle he began the Bibliothecae Apostol. Vatic. codd. manusc. Catal., in tres partes distributus. Only three volumes were published, and the fire in the Vatican library in 1768 consumed the manuscript collections which had been prepared for the continuation of the work.

== Works ==
- Stephen Evodius Assemani, ed. (2010). Acta Sanctorum Martyrum Orientalium et Occidentalium: Eastern and Western Martyrdom Texts in Syriac (in Latin and English). Piscataway, NJ: Gorgias Press. ISBN 9781463224073. OCLC 1110713376.
