= Maria Ziadie-Haddad =

Aviator

- Born: Maria Theresa Ziadie; 1955 (age 70–71)
- Other names: Maria T. Ziadie, Maria Haddad
- Occupation: pilot
- Years active: 1979-present
- Known for: first woman commercial pilot hired by Air Jamaica and first woman captain hired by Air Jamaica

Maria Ziadie-Haddad (born 1955) is an airline pilot from Jamaica. She was the first woman commercial pilot hired by Air Jamaica and upon obtaining her qualifications as a captain became Air Jamaica's first woman captain. When the government divested its holding in the firm, Ziadie Haddad began flying commercial freight in the United States.

== Early life ==
Maria Theresa Ziadie was born in Jamaica and attended Servite Convent in Brown's Town. From the age of four, she was interested in flight, but after completing her secondary education, Ziadie pursued a college education in psychology at a Canadian University. Taking a year off, she joined Air Jamaica as a stewardess and while attending an employment seminar on flying decided to change the direction of her career choice. She enrolled in a pilot training course with Wings Jamaica and obtained her private pilot's license in February 1978, after passing the examination of Civil Aviation Authority of London. She then enrolled in a flight instructor course and upon passing it, terminated her job as a flight attendant and began offering chartered pilot services and teaching. Continuing in her field, Ziadie then enrolled in a commercial licensing course at the Opa Locka Flight Center near Miami, Florida, which was at that time, the busiest air field in the United States.

== Career ==
In 1979, after completing her training, Ziadie was hired as the first woman commercial pilot of Air Jamaica. She was not the first woman licensed in Jamaica. In 1952, Earsley Barnett, American wife of Major Carl Barnett, founder of Wings Jamaica, earned the first pilot license granted to a woman in Jamaica. She later became the first Jamaican flight instructor as well as commercial pilot. Then in 1975 Yola Cain became the first Jamaican-born commercial pilot and flight instructor. Ziadie was hired as a second officer, for Air Jamaica, co-piloting a Boeing 727 making her one of the first commercial female jet pilots in the Western Hemisphere. She was promoted in 1982 as second officer of the Airbus A300 fleet and four years later became the A300 fleet’s first officer.

Ziada married fellow pilot Brian B. Haddad, who served ten years with the Jamaica Defence Force before moving over to Air Jamaica. On 1 July 1996, Ziada-Haddad served as co-captain on a Boeing 727 flight #034 from Fort Lauderdale to Kingston with Captain Enrique Acevedo. The following day, she commanded her first solo flight as captain on Air Jamaica's flight #031 returning from Kingston to Fort Lauderdale, becoming Air Jamaica's first female captain. In January 1997, Ziada-Haddad began commanding the Airbus A320 fleet and at the end of the same year, served as captain on Air Jamaica's first all-female flight along with first officer "Melvina 'Debbie' Anderson, Purser Nadene Alexander, Flight Attendants Lisbeth Allen, Keisha Grant, and Judith Pryce".

When Air Jamaica closed in 2010, Ziadie-Haddad began flying for Atlas Air in Purchase, New York and was targeted to begin flying the Boeing 747-8 freighters in 2012. In 2013, Ziadie-Haddad was included on the roster of the FAA Airmen Certification Database, for having met or exceeded the educational and health certification requirements of the United States Federal Aviation Administration.

== Legacy ==
Ziadie-Haddad was honored as one of the pioneering women of Jamaica in a 2010 ceremony in conjunction with the Organisation of American States' Year of Women celebration.
