= Maximianus of Constantinople =

Archbishop of Constantinople from 431 to 434

- Archbishop of Constantinople
- Installed: 25 October 431
- Term ended: 12 April 434
- Predecessor: Nestorius of Constantinople
- Successor: Proclus of Constantinople

Personal details
- Born: Rome
- Died: 12 April 434
- Denomination: Eastern Christianity

Maximianus of Constantinople (Greek: Μαξιμινιανός; died 12 April 434) was the archbishop of Constantinople from 25 October 431 until his death on 12 April 434.

== Biography ==
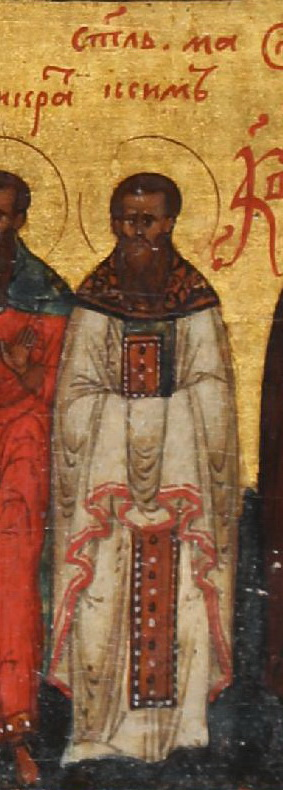

Maximianus was born in Rome from wealthy and pious parents. He had led a monastic life and had entered presbyteral orders; his action in building, at his own expense, tombs for the remains of holy men had obtained for him a reputation of sanctity. Sisinnius I of Constantinople ordained him presbyter.

The action of the first Council of Ephesus had thrown the churches of Constantinople into direst confusion. A large proportion of the citizens held strongly to Nestorius; the clergy, with one voice, agreed in the anathema. When the deposition became a fact no longer to be disputed, the excitement was continued about the election of a successor. After four months, agreement was arrived at in the election of Maximian.

In principles he followed the former archbishops, John Chrysostom, Atticus of Constantinople, and Sisinnius I of Constantinople. Pope Celestine I wrote to him in highly complimentary terms on his elevation. The appointment was made by the unanimous vote of clergy, Roman emperor, and people. The letter of Maximianus announcing to the pope his succession is lost, but that to Cyril of Alexandria remains, with its high eulogium on Cyril's constancy in defending the cause of Jesus.

It was the custom for occupants of the principal sees on election to send a synodical letter to the most considerable bishops of the Christian world, asking for the assurance of their communion. Maximianus sent his synodical to the Easterns as to the others. Communion was refused by bishop Helladius of Tarsus; and, we may conclude, by Eutherios of Tyana, Himerius of Nicomedia, and Dorotheus of Martianopolis, as Maximianus deposed them. Patriarch John I of Antioch approved the refusal of the bishop of Tarsus and praised him for having declined to insert the name of Maximianus in the diptychs of his church.

Maximianus's earnest appeal for reunion continued. Pope Sixtus III wrote to him several times, urging him to extend his charity to all whom he could possibly regain. Maximianus spared no effort, and although he was in closest harmony with Saint Cyril, he pressed him strongly to give up his anathemas, which seemed an insurmountable obstacle to reunion. He even wrote to the emperor's secretary Aristolaus the tribune, who was greatly interested in the question of peace, almost complaining that he did not press Cyril enough on the point, and to his archdeacon Epiphanius.

Harmony being restored, John of Antioch and the other Eastern bishops wrote Maximianus a letter of communion indicating their consent to his election and to the deposition of Nestorius. Cyril wrote to him, attributing the blessed result to the force of his prayers. A letter to Maximianus from Aristolaus, which Maximianus caused to be read in his church to his people, was pronounced spurious by Dorotheus of Martianopolis, evidently because it took the side of Maximianus so decidedly.

Maximianus died in office. Of all his letters, only that to Saint Cyril is extant.

== Notes and references ==
=== Attribution ===
- Sinclair cites:
  - Étienne Baluze, Nov. Coll. Conc., 581 seq., ed. 1681;
  - Liberat., Diac. Brev. 19; Ceill. viii, 394;
  - Giovanni Domenico Mansi, v. 257, 259, 266, 269, 271, 273, 286, 351;
  - Socrates, vii, 35.40.

Titles of the Great Christian Church
Preceded by Nestorius	Archbishop of Constantinople; 431 – 434	Succeeded by Proclus
