= 434 =

434 in various calendars
- Gregorian calendar: 434; CDXXXIV
- Ab urbe condita: 1187
- Assyrian calendar: 5184
- Balinese saka calendar: 355–356
- Bengali calendar: −160 – −159
- Berber calendar: 1384
- Buddhist calendar: 978
- Burmese calendar: −204
- Byzantine calendar: 5942–5943
- Chinese calendar: 癸酉年 (Water Rooster); 3131 or 2924 — to — 甲戌年 (Wood Dog); 3132 or 2925
- Coptic calendar: 150–151
- Discordian calendar: 1600
- Ethiopian calendar: 426–427
- Hebrew calendar: 4194–4195
- Hindu calendars
- Vikram Samvat: 490–491
- Shaka Samvat: 355–356
- Kali Yuga: 3534–3535
- Holocene calendar: 10434
- Iranian calendar: 188 BP – 187 BP
- Islamic calendar: 194 BH – 193 BH
- Javanese calendar: 318–319
- Julian calendar: 434; CDXXXIV
- Korean calendar: 2767
- Minguo calendar: 1478 before ROC 民前1478年
- Nanakshahi calendar: −1034
- Seleucid era: 745/746 AG
- Thai solar calendar: 976–977
- Tibetan calendar: ཆུ་མོ་བྱ་ལོ་ (female Water-Bird); 560 or 179 or −593 — to — ཤིང་ཕོ་ཁྱི་ལོ་ (male Wood-Dog); 561 or 180 or −592

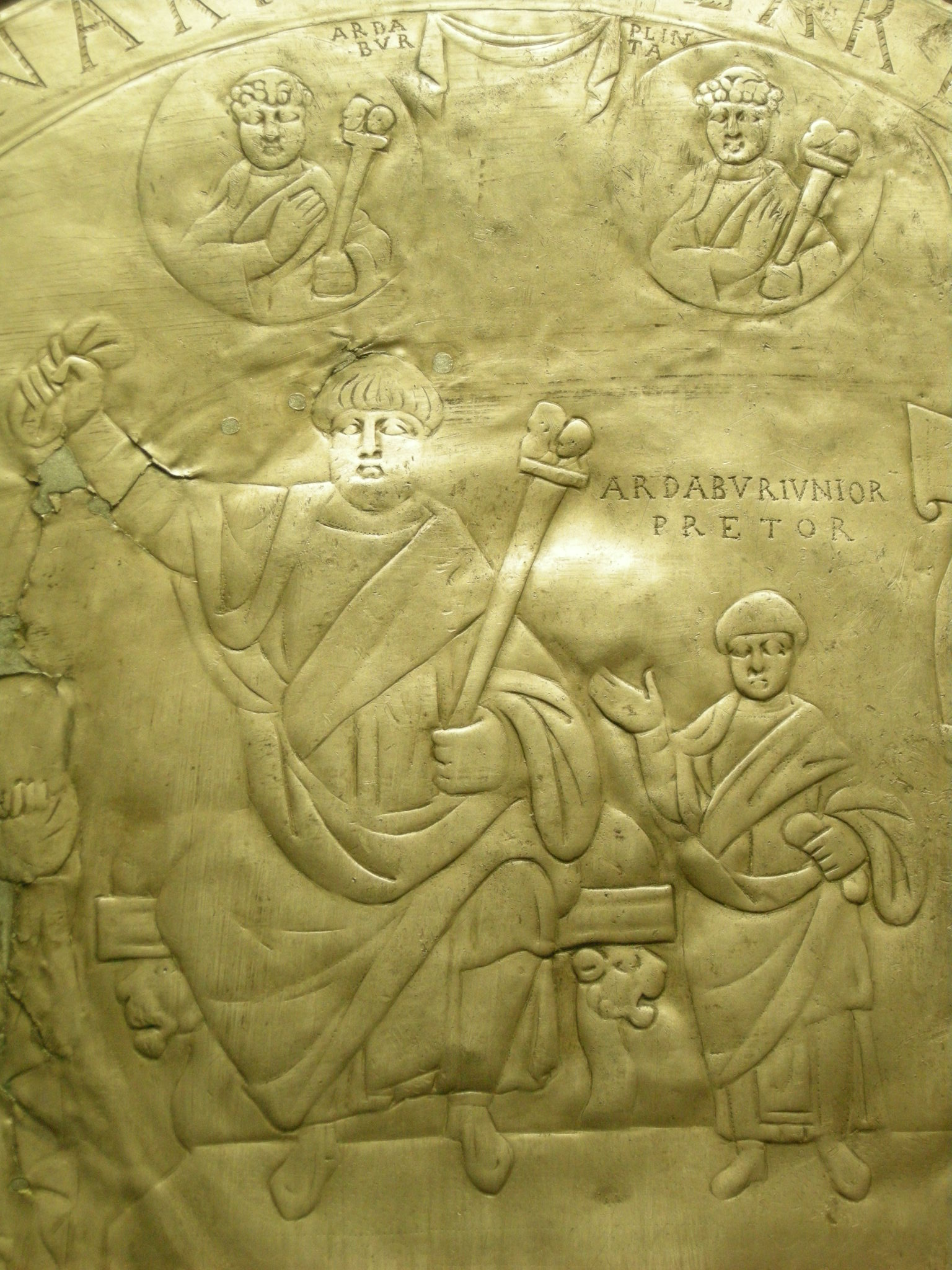
The Missorium of Aspar and his elder son Ardabur (434)

Year 434 (CDXXXIV) was a common year starting on Monday of the Julian calendar. At the time, it was known as the Year of the Consulship of Aspar and Areobindus (or, less frequently, year 1187 Ab urbe condita). The denomination 434 for this year has been used since the early medieval period, when the Anno Domini calendar era became the prevalent method in Europe for naming years.

== Events ==
=== By place ===
==== Roman Empire ====
- Flavius Aetius, Roman general (magister militum) in the service of Emperor Valentinian III, begins to hold power in Rome (this will continue for 20 years). He allows the Huns to settle in Pannonia, along the Sava River.
- Justa Grata Honoria, older sister of Valentinian, becomes pregnant from an officer in her household. Circles in the court at Ravenna assume inevitably that Honoria is planning to raise her paramour to imperial rank and challenge her brother. Valentinian then has him executed.
- Summer – The Huns under Rugila devastate Thrace and move steadily towards Constantinople. The citizens prepare themselves for a long siege, depending on the strength of the Theodosian Walls.
- Emperor Theodosius II bribes the Huns (after the death of Rugila) to keep the peace in the Eastern Roman Empire.

==== Africa ====
- The Vandals in North Africa defeat the Roman general Aspar and force him to withdraw. He serves as consul at Constantinople.

==== Europe ====
- Attila, king of the Huns, consolidates his power in the Hungarian capital, probably on the site of Buda (modern Budapest). He jointly rules the kingdom with his brother Bleda.

=== By topic ===
==== Religion ====
- April 12 – Maximianus dies on Great and Holy Thursday. He is succeeded by Proclus, who becomes archbishop of Constantinople.

== Deaths ==
- April 12 – Maximianus, archbishop of Constantinople
- Helian Chang, emperor of the Chinese Xiongnu state Xia
- Rugila, king of the Huns (approximate date)
- Tao Sheng, Chinese Buddhist scholar
