= Severian of Gabala =

Bishop of Gabala

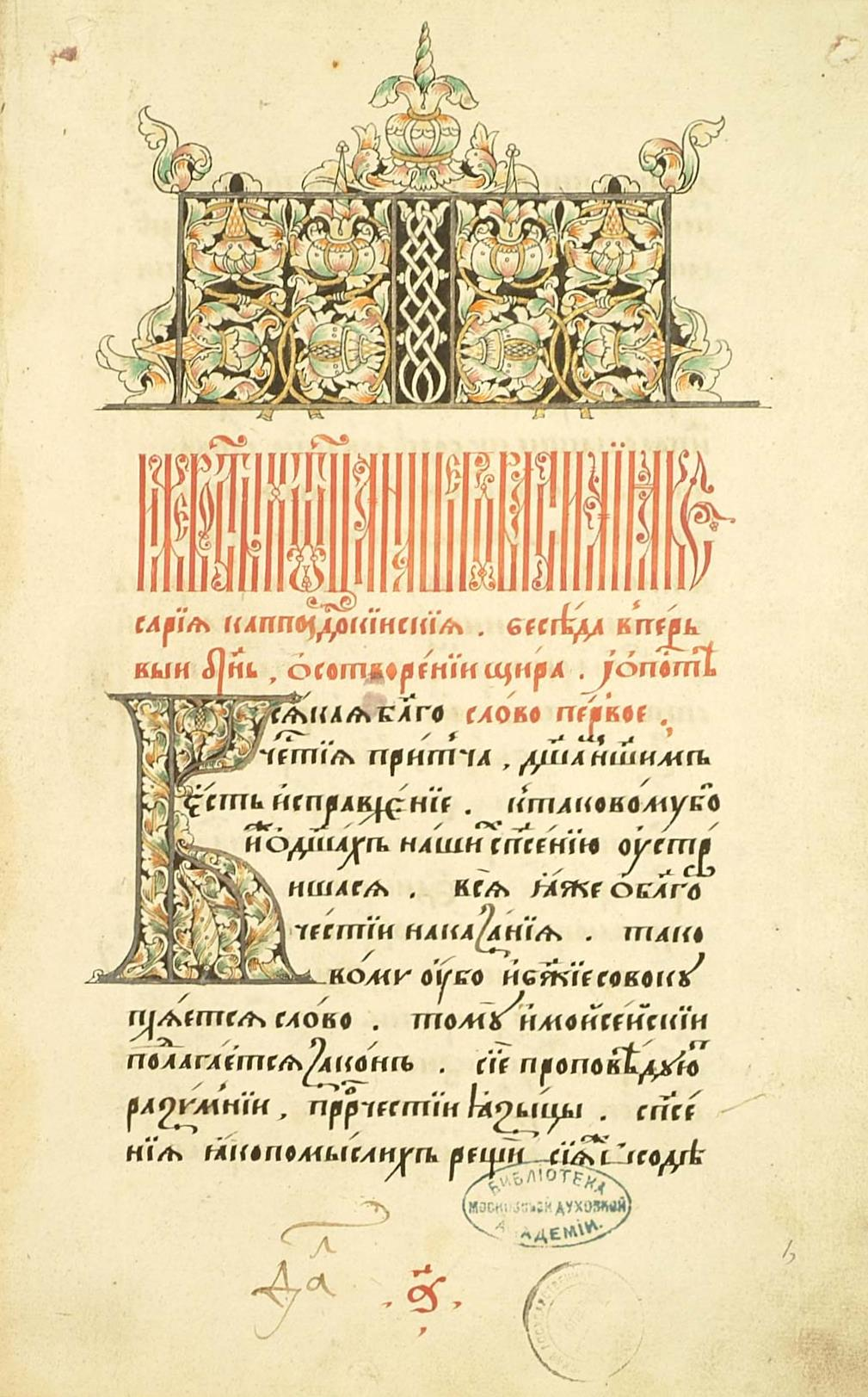
Hexameron of Severian of Gabala 01.jpg

Severian, Bishop of Gabala in Syria (Greek: Σεβηριανός; 355 – 408/425), was a popular preacher in Constantinople from around 400 until 404. He became the enemy of John Chrysostom and helped condemn him at the Synod of the Oak.

Details of his life are scanty, and are preserved in Socrates Scholasticus and Sozomen. There is a brief entry in Gennadius of Massilia. These tell us that he came to Constantinople around 400. He preached in a definite Syrian accent, and became a favourite of the Empress Eudoxia. When, by the end of 401, the then archbishop John Chrysostom went to Asia, he entrusted Severian with the pastoral care of the Church of Constantinople. However, Severian was opposed and insulted by the deacon Sarapion, to whom Chrysostom had delegated the Church's economic affairs. When Chrysostom backed his own men, he and Severian became enemies. Quasten described Severian as "full of hate" for Jews and heretics.

More than 50 of his sermons are extant. In Greek almost all of his homilies survive only among the works of his enemy Chrysostom. Several homilies, some of them lost in Greek, were translated into other languages (Latin, Coptic, Georgian, Armenian, Slavonic and Arabic, perhaps also into Syriac.) Eight of Severian's sermons were published in Venice in 1827 by J. B. Aucher from an ancient Armenian translation: the Greek text six of these are lost or are known only from catena quotations. Almost none have been edited critically, some have never been published, and the list is not certainly complete. Details of Severian's works can be found in the Clavis Patrum Graecorum nos. 4185-4295. One was printed by Migne in the Patrologia Graeca 65; several feature among the spuria attributed to John Chrysostom (Patrologia Graeca 48-63).

Severian belonged to the Antiochene school of exegesis, and his interpretations can be very literal. He is notorious for his six sermons on the Creation, in which he expresses "absurdly literal" views including support for the Flat Earth.

Severian's Discourse on the Seals discusses the canon of the four Gospels.

His biblical commentaries were also drawn upon by Greek catenas.

Severian is sometimes confused in manuscripts with Eusebius of Emesa, as happens especially in Armenian, and as regards Greek texts with Severus of Antioch.

== Literature ==
- J. B. Aucher, Severiani sive Seberiani Gabalorum episcopi Emesensis Homiliae, Venice, 1827. Sermons in Armenian translation.
- Remco F. Regtuit, Severian of Gabala, Homily on the Incarnation of Christ (CPG 4204). VU University Press, Amsterdam, 1992.
- Cyril Moss, Homily on the Nativity of Our Lord by Severian, Bishop of Gabala, Bulletin of the School of Oriental and African Studies, University of London, Vol. 12, No. 3/4, Oriental and African Studies Presented to Lionel David Barnett by His Colleagues, Past and Present (1948), pp. 555–566 - Syriac text and English translation of text found in British Library Ms. Oriental 8606 and Vatican Ms. Syr. 369, fol. 15v-17v.
- Johannes Zellinger, Die Genesishomilien des Bischofs Severian von Gabala. Aschendorff, 1916.
- Henry Wace, Dictionary of Christian Biography - article on Severian.
- Robert C. Hill and Carmen S. Hardin, Commentaries on Genesis 1-3 , IVP (2010), ISBN 978-0-8308-2907-1. English translation of Severian's Six sermons on Genesis, plus some sermons by Bede.
- Antoine Wenger, Une homélie inédite de Sévérien de Gabala sur le lavement des pieds, Revue des études byzantines vol. 25 (1967), p. 219-234.
