= 434th =

434th may refer to:

- 434th Air Refueling Wing, one of the key refueling units in the US Air Force Reserve
- 434th Bombardment Squadron, an inactive United States Air Force unit
- 434th Fighter Training Squadron (434 FTS), part of the 47th Flying Training Wing based at Laughlin Air Force Base, Texas
- 434th Operations Group, an active United States Air Force Reserve unit

== See also ==
- 434 (number)
- 434, the year 434 (CDXXXIV) of the Julian calendar
- 434 BC
