= Atticus of Constantinople =

Archbishop of Constantinople from 406 to 425

- Archbishop of Constantinople
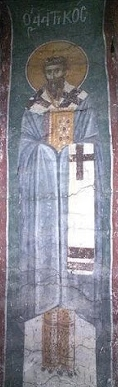
- Archbishop Atticus of Constantinople
- Installed: March 406
- Term ended: 10 October 425
- Predecessor: Arsacius of Tarsus
- Successor: Sisinnius I of Constantinople

Personal details
- Born: Sivas, Roman Empire
- Died: 10 October 425
- Denomination: Eastern Christianity

Atticus of Constantinople (Ancient Greek: Ἀττικός; died 10 October 425) was an archbishop of Constantinople, succeeding to the episcopal throne in March 406. He is known for having been an opponent of John Chrysostom whom he helped depose, and having rebuilt the small church that was located on the site of the later Hagia Sophia. He was an opponent of the Pelagians, which helped increase his popularity among the citizens of Constantinople, and he contributed to the theological framework for the developing cult of the Virgin Mary.

== Biography ==
Born at Sivas in the second half of the 4th century, Atticus early embraced a monastic life and received his education from Macedonian monks, a fact which restricted his philosophical learning and ensured he would always have an Armenian accent considered unpleasant to Greek ears. Removing to Constantinople, he adopted the orthodox faith, was ordained presbyter, and soon became known as a rising man for his intelligence, charm, and political moderation. He proved himself one of Chrysostom's most bitter adversaries. If not, as Palladius of Galatia asserts, the architect of the whole cabal, he certainly took a leading part in carrying it into execution. The organization of the Synod of the Oak owed much to his practical skill and he was one of the seven witnesses called to testify against Chrysostom. The expulsion of Chrysostom took place 10 June 404 and his successor, the aged Arsacius of Tarsus who was the brother of Chrystom's predecessor Nectarius of Constantinople, died 5 November 405. Four months of intrigue ended in the selection of Atticus.

Vigorous measures were at once adopted by Atticus in conjunction with the other members of the triumvirate to which the Eastern church had been subjected, Theophilus I of Alexandria, and Porphyrus of Antioch, to crush the adherents of Chrysostom. An imperial rescript was obtained imposing the severest penalties on all who dared to reject the communion of the patriarchs. A large number of the bishops of the East persevered in the refusal and suffered a cruel persecution; while even the inferior clergy and laity were compelled to keep themselves in concealment or to flee the country. The small minority of Eastern bishops who, for peace's sake, deserted Chrysostom's cause were made to feel the guilt of having once supported it, being compelled to leave their sees and take other dioceses in the inhospitable regions of Thrace, where they might be more under Atticus's eye and hand.

Unity seemed hardly nearer when the death of Chrysostom (14 September 407) removed the original ground of the schism. A large proportion of the Christian population of Constantinople still supported their former bishop, with many refusing communion with the man they considered a usurper and continuing to hold their religious assemblies, more numerously attended than the churches, in the open air in the suburbs of the city. Atticus subsequently made strides to reconcile with the "Johannites", placing Chrysostom's name in the diptychs of the Church around 412–415. Nevertheless, the internal schism would last until the late bishop's memory was fully rehabilitated with the transfer of his relics to the capital two decades later.

In 408 Roman emperor Arcadius died, leaving behind a son, Theodosius II, and three daughters, all of whom were children. Thus the affairs of state and the education of the youthful Imperial Family were managed by a regency government of which Atticus played a leading part. Atticus gained particular influence over the princesses, Pulcheria, Arcadia, and Marina. His episcopacy saw a period of prosperity and peace for church and empire; shrines, monasteries and churches were built throughout the capital, the walls of which were greatly expanded in 412. The iconic Church of the Holy Wisdom was rebuilt after a fire.

Some time before 425, Atticus received a delegation of Armenian clergymen who sought to secure approval for using the newly invented Armenian alphabet. Persian and Syrian influence was growing in the Armenian Church during this time, and Bishop Atticus had to navigate a diplomatically sensitive affair.

Atticus's 19-year archepiscopal endeavours were vigorously directed to the maintenance and enlargement of the authority of the see of Constantinople. He obtained a rescript from Roman emperor Theodosius II subjecting to it the whole of Illyria and the "Provincia Orientalis". This gave great offence to Pope Boniface I and the Roman emperor Honorius, and the decree was never put into execution. Another rescript declaring his right to decide on and approve of the election of all the bishops of the province was more effectual. Silvanus was named by him bishop of Philippopolis and afterwards removed to Alexandria Troas. Atticus asserted his right to ordain in Bithynia, and put it in practice at Nicaea in 425.

He died on 10 October 425.

== Teachings ==
=== Anti-heretical endeavours ===
Though he was lenient toward the Novatians and the partisans of John Chrysostom, Atticus displayed great vigour in combating and repressing heresy. He wrote to the bishop of Pamphylia and to Amphilochius of Iconium, calling on them to drive out the Messalians (Photius, c. 52). He likewise strove against the lingering adherents of Arianism and Apollinarism in his Letter to Eupsychius, in which he affirmed that "God suffered in a body" and that Jesus is "self-same God and man". The letter was later recognised at the Council of Chalcedon.

Socrates of Constantinople, who is a partial witness, attributes to him a sweet and winning disposition which caused him to be regarded with much affection. Those who thought with him found in him a warm friend and supporter. Towards his theological adversaries he at first showed great severity, and after they submitted, changed his behaviour and won them by gentleness. He characterised Atticus as spending whole nights in study of "the ancients".

The zeal and energy he displayed against the Pelagians are highly commended by Pope Celestine I, who goes so far as to posthumously style him "a true successor of St. Chrysostom".; Theod. Ep. cxlv.). His writings were quoted as those of an orthodox teacher by the councils of Ephesus and Chalcedon. Atticus was more an administrator than a writer, and of what he did publish little remains. A treatise On Faith and Virginity, combating by anticipation the errors of Nestorius, addressed to Roman emperor Arcadius' daughters Pulcheria and her sisters, is mentioned by Marcellinus Comes. Constas esteems that it "probably contributed to the princess's decision to embrace virginity and asceticism", tied up with burgeoning Marian devotions.

=== Mariology ===
Atticus played a noteworthy role in the development of Marian theology. He used the term Theotokos long before the outbreak of the Nestorian controversy, and has been reckoned among the earliest champions of the cult of the Virgin. In the "Letter to Eupsychius" he "stressed the importance of Mary for a proper understanding of orthodox christology", characterising Mary's womb as that which "like heaven, receives God" in emphasising the wonder of the divine maternity. Constas identifies this strong Christological-Mariological synthesis in the intellectual and devotional climate of the city, building upon earlier works by figures like the Cappadocians, as the catalyst for later Nestorian repudiation. The Bishop's comparative lack of rhetorical erudition was offset by his talented secretary Proclus of Constantinople who acted as his ghost-writer. Because of his reputation for devotion to Mary, it is probable that the first official Marian feast in Constantinople, held during the Nativity cycle, was introduced during Atticus' tenure.

== Veneration ==
He is highly regarded for his charity and piety and is venerated as a Saint in the Eastern Orthodox Church, which observes his feast on 8 January.

== Notes and references ==
=== Attribution ===
- cites:
  - Labbe, Conc. iii, pp. 353, 361, 365, 518, 1073, iv, p. 831;
  - Niceph. xiii. 30, xiv. 23, 27;
  - Palladius of Galatia, Dial. c. xx;
  - Photius, c. 52; cf. S. Prosper. p. 549;
  - S. Leo, Ep. cvi;
  - Socrates Scholasticus, H. E., vii, pp. 25, 28, 36, 37, 41;
  - Sozomen, viii, 27;
  - Theodoret, Ep. cv.

Titles of the Great Christian Church
Preceded by Arsacius of Tarsus	Archbishop of Constantinople; 406 – 425	Succeeded by Sisinnius I
