= Arsacius of Tarsus =

Archbishop of Constantinople from 404 to 405

- Archbishop of Constantinople
- Church: Christian Church
- Installed: 27 June 404
- Term ended: 11 November 405
- Predecessor: John Chrysostom
- Successor: Atticus of Constantinople

Personal details
- Born: c. 324
- Died: 11 November 405

Arsacius of Tarsus (Greek: Ἀρσάκιος; before 324 – 11 November 405) was the intruding archbishop of Constantinople from 404 to 405, after the violent expulsion of John Chrysostom.

== Biography ==
He was the brother of Nectarius of Constantinople, Chrysostom's predecessor, and had served as archpresbyter under Chrysostom. In earlier life his brother had selected him for the bishopric of Tarsus and had attributed his refusal to an ambitious design of becoming his successor at Constantinople. On this, Palladius of Galatia asserts, he swore voluntarily that he would never accept the see of Constantinople.

When he was approximately 80 years old, the success of the intrigue of Aelia Eudoxia, empress of Roman emperor Arcadius, and Theophilus I of Alexandria, Patriarch of Alexandria, against Chrysostom opened an unexpected path to the archiepiscopal throne. Eudoxia and her triumphant co-conspirators wanted an archbishop they could control, whose authority could cover up their plot. Arsacius met these requirements. Moreover, his hostility to Chrysostom had been sufficiently testified at the synod of the Oak, when he appeared as a witness against him and vehemently pressed his condemnation.

He was consecrated archbishop on 27 June 404. Chrysostom, on hearing of it, denounced him "as a spiritual adulterer, and a wolf in sheep's clothing". The diocese soon made it plain that they regarded the new archbishop as an intruder. With the exception of a few officials, the dependants of the court party, and the expectants of royal favour, the people of Constantinople refused to attend any religious assembly at which he might be expected to be present. Deserting the sacred edifices, they gathered in the outskirts of the city and in the open air.

Arsacius appealed to the Roman emperor Arcadius, by whose orders, or rather those of Eudoxia, soldiers were sent to disperse the suburban assemblies. Those who had taken a leading part in them were apprehended and tortured, and a fierce persecution commenced of the adherents of Chrysostom. We learn from Sozomen, that Arsacius was not personally responsible for these cruel deeds; but he lacked strength of character to offer any decided opposition to the proceedings of his clergy. They did what they pleased, and Arsacius bore the blame.

Arsacius' position became intolerable. In vain all the bishops and clergy who, embracing Chrysostom's cause, had refused to recognize him were driven out of the East on 18 November 404. This only spread the evil more widely. The whole Western episcopate refused to acknowledge him, and Pope Innocent I, who had warmly espoused Chrysostom's interests, wrote to the clergy and laity of Constantinople strongly condemning the intrusion of Arsacius, and exhorting them to persevere in their adhesion to their true archbishop. It is no cause for surprise that Arsacius's episcopate was a brief one and that a feeble character worn out by old age should have soon given way before a storm of opposition so universal.

He died 11 November 405.

== Veneration ==
Arsacius is venerated as a saint in the Eastern Orthodox Church on 11 October. He was venerated in the first millennium.

== Notes and references ==
=== Attribution ===
- :
  - Chrysostom Ep. cxxv;
  - Palladius of Galatia Dial c.xi;
  - Photius I, C. 59;
  - Socrates Scholasticus H.E., vi, p. 19;
  - Sozomen H. E., viii, pp. 23, 26.

Titles of the Great Christian Church
Preceded by John Chrysostom	Archbishop of Constantinople; 404 – 405	Succeeded by Atticus
