= Antiochus (bishop of Ptolemais) =

Antiochus (Ancient Greek: Ἀντίοχος) was a bishop of Ptolemais in Palestine. A Syrian by birth, he went to Constantinople at the beginning of the 5th century AD, where his eloquent preaching attracted such attention that he was called by some another Chrysostom. He afterward took part warmly with the enemies of Chrysostom, and died not later than 408.

Besides many sermons, Antiochus left a large work "against Avarice", which is lost.
