= Proclus of Constantinople =

Archbishop of Constantinople from 434 to 446

Saint Proclus of Constantinople
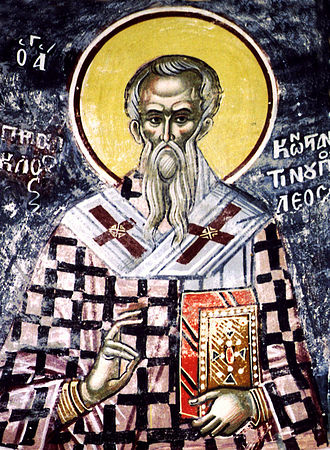
- Fresco from Moni Agiou Vissarionos

Archbishop of Constantinople
- Born: c. 390
- Died: 24 July 446
- Venerated in: Catholic Church; Eastern Catholic Churches; Eastern Orthodox Church; Oriental Orthodoxy
- Canonized: Pre-Congregation
- Feast: 20 November (Eastern Churches); 24 October (Catholic Church)

Proclus of Constantinople (Greek: Πρόκλος; c. 390 – 24 July 446) was the Archbishop of Constantinople from 434 until his death. Renowned for his homiletic abilities, Proclus played a central role in the Nestorian controversy. His contributions to the theology of the developing cult of the Virgin Mary place him among the early and foremost Marian theologians. He is venerated as a saint in the Catholic Church, the Eastern Catholic Churches, the Eastern Orthodox Church, and Oriental Orthodoxy.

== Biography ==
Proclus was born around the year 390 and became a reader in Constantinople at a young age. He studied rhetoric and classical authors under private tutors, and came under the influence of Alexandrian intellectuals who had emigrated to the city. He is traditionally held to have been the friend and disciple of Saint John Chrysostom (397–405), who is said to have ordained him. However, Constas shows that this link between the two men was retroactively created in the Medieval period. Instead, Proclus was a disciple of and personal secretary to archbishop Atticus of Constantinople (406–425) who was impressed by his talents as a writer, rhetorician, and orator. During his episcopate, Atticus ordained Proclus deacon and priest, and the young man quickly became an essential part of the archiepiscopal administration. He acted both as scribe and as ghost-writer for his bishop, who was less eloquent and intellectually well-rounded than his protege. During the course of pastoral and diplomatic visits to the Imperial residences, Proclus forged his lasting relationships with the Imperial family.

He was a candidate to succeed Atticus upon the latter's death in 425, but the populace favoured the elderly Sisinnius I of Constantinople (426–427) for his lack of affiliation with local rivalries and his charity to the poor. Proclus befriended him, and Sisinnius consecrated him Bishop of the dependent See of Cyzicus in 426. His enthronement was prevented when the residents of the city refused to receive him and elected their own bishop in contravention of canon law, so Proclus remained at Constantinople as titular bishop. Under Sissinius' patronage, Proclus became increasingly famous as a popular preacher, earning him comparisons with the renowned homiletic talents of John Chrysostom. On the death of Sisinnius factions broke out once again with Proclus and Philip of Side, who had also contested in 425, as the leading candidates. The competition was so fierce that the Emperor intervened and installed an outsider, the well-known Antiochene orator Nestorius, as Archbishop (sed. 428–431). In late 428, as part of his vicious and unpopular persecution of heretical groups, Nestorius and his retinue began to preach against the propriety of calling Mary the Theotokos. A traditional title that had been in use for over a century and utilised by preceding bishops of Constantinople like Gregory of Nazianzus, Theotokos was by this point deeply associated with the liturgical life of the capital. Although he was initially reticent to get involved in the emerging dispute when a monastic deacon named Basil submitted a formal accusation of heresy to the Emperor against the Archbishop, Proclus withdrew from communion with Nestorius. In 430, on the occasion of a Feast Day of the Theotokos that was probably instituted under Atticus for the Nativity Cycle, Proclus was invited by Nestorius to deliver a homily from the pulpit before a mixed crowd. He preached his celebrated panegyric sermon on the Virgin Mary, a masterpiece of exegetical insight and rhetorical flourish that has been called the most famous Marian sermon in history, and which was later inserted into the beginning of the Acts of the first Council of Ephesus.

Proclus' sermon did much to progress the case against Nestorius, and he would continue to launch homiletic attacks on the Archbishop. The controversy quickly spread beyond the capital and engulfed the Christian world. Although he did not attend the Council of Ephesus at which Nestorius was subsequently deposed, Proclus was the recipient of a letter from the conciliar president and leader of the anti-Nestorian party, Cyril of Alexandria, in which his contribution was warmly acknowledged. In the aftermath of these tumultuous events, the clergy of Constantinople were once again thrown into factionalism concerning who was to ascend the archiepiscopal throne. Proclus was now the leading candidate but because he was already a bishop, formal application of canon law prevented his transfer from one diocese to another. His opponents in government used this against him because popular support, not least among powerful women, was considered a threat in a time when religious disputes were at fever pitch. Instead, a quiet, aged priest called Maximianus was elected (sed. 431–434), who oversaw the union of the Cyrillian party with the Johannine party.

By the time Archbishop Maximianus died on Great and Holy Thursday of 434, the Imperial government had firmly come down on the side of the anti-Nestorians and were keen to avoid further electoral disturbances. To that end, Proclus was immediately enthroned by the permission of the Emperor Theodosius II and the bishops gathered at Constantinople. His first care was the funeral of his predecessor, and he then sent to both Patriarchs Cyril of Alexandria and John I of Antioch the usual synodical letters announcing his appointment, both of whom approved of it. His archiepiscopacy was dominated by the aftermath of the Council of Ephesus, and his consecration was rejected by the portion of Eastern bishops who had seceded from communion with John of Antioch after his reunion with Cyril.

In 436 the bishops of Armenia consulted Proclus upon certain doctrines prevalent in their country and attributed to Theodore of Mopsuestia asking for their condemnation. Proclus replied the next year in the celebrated letter known as the Tome to the Armenians, which he sent to the Eastern bishops, asking them to sign it and to join in condemning the doctrines of the Armenians. They approved of the letters, but from admiration of Theodore hesitated to condemn the doctrines attributed to him. Proclus replied that while he desired the extracts subjoined to his Tome to be condemned, he had not attributed them to Theodore or any individual, not desiring the condemnation of any person. A rescript from Theodosius procured by Proclus, declaring his wish that all should live in peace and that no imputation should be made against anyone who died in communion with the church, appeased the storm. The whole affair showed conspicuously the moderation and tact of Proclus and resulted in a period of peace for the Churches of the East after the Imperial Commission secured a forced union through exiling Nestorius and his closest supporters.

In continuity with the conciliation of Atticus in the latter years of his episcopacy, Proclus oversaw the transfer of the relics of Saint John Chrysostom from Comana Pontica back to Constantinople in 438, where he interred them with great honour in the Church of the Twelve apostles. This action finally reconciled to the Church those of Saint John's adherents who had separated themselves in consequence of the deposition as Archbishop which they regarded as having been unjust.

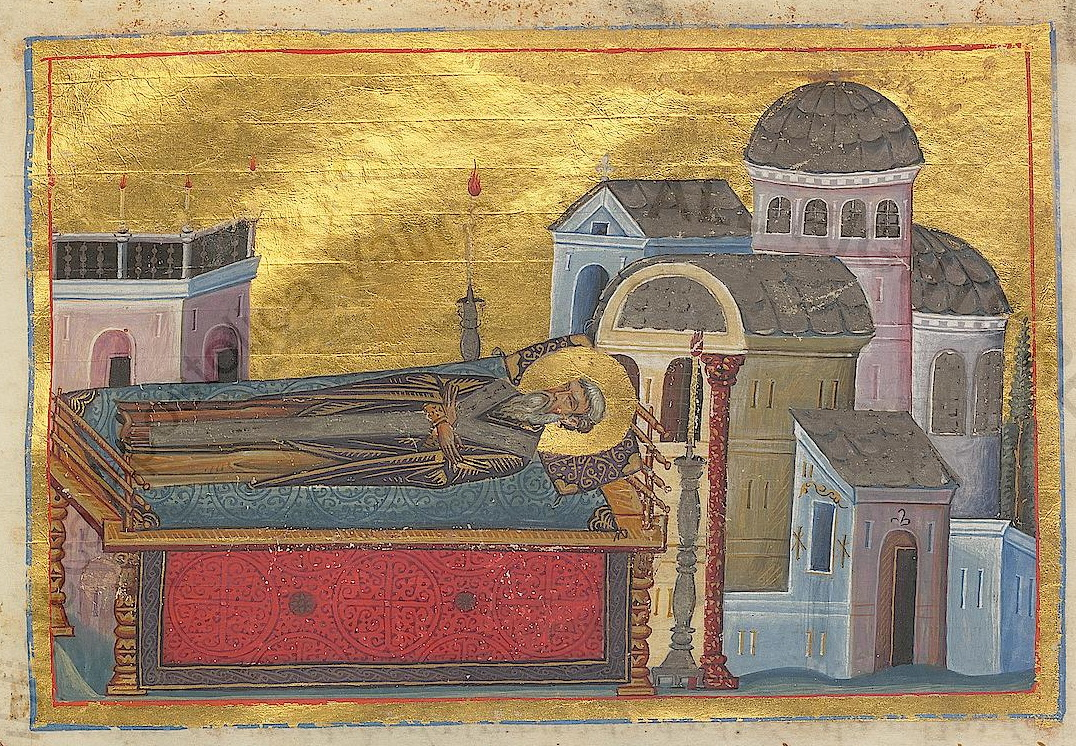
Proclus portrayed in the Menologion of Basil II

In 439, at the request of a deputation from Caesarea in Cappadocia, Proclus selected as their new bishop Thalassius, who was about to be appointed praetorian prefect of the East.

In the time of Proclus, the Trisagion came into use. The occasion is said to have been a time when violent earthquakes lasted for four months at Constantinople so that the people were obliged to leave the city and encamp in the fields.

Proclus died on 24 July 446. He appears to have been wise, moderate, and conciliatory, desirous, while strictly adhering to Orthodoxy himself, to win over those who differed from him by persuasion rather than force.

== Theology ==
Having been educated in the cosmopolitan capital of the Eastern Roman Empire, Proclus was learned in the various streams of thought that characterised late antiquity. A strong rhetorician, he made robust use of the Old Testament, vibrant imagery, rhythmic delivery, colorful metaphors and logical argumentation. He also continued the trend of his predecessors in expanding both the construction of churches, shrines and monasteries suitable to house growing numbers of relics and monks, but also the jurisdictional reach of the See of Constantinople. Proclus became famous as a popular preacher, gaining a reputation as successor in homiletic prowess to John Chrysostom.

=== Christology and Soteriology ===
Proclus' homilies present clear affirmations of the unity and duality of the natures of Christ in terminology Constas describes as "anticipating the language of Chalcedon". He taught a union of opposites, a union of natures where they remain unconfused, divinity clothed with humanity. While maintaining the two natures he stressed the personal unity of Jesus. For Proclus the Word-made-flesh dying sacrificially was essential to secure salvation; no mere man could pay the debt of sin, but man had sinned so man had to pay, necessitating the incarnation of God.

=== Mariology ===
Proclus' chief contribution to Theology belongs to the area of Marian theology and devotion. His mentor Archbishop Atticus made important contributions to the development of early Byzantine veneration of the Virgin in the two decades prior to the Council of Ephesus, chiefly through the establishment of the first officially sanctioned Marian feast. Constas argues that through his role as Atticus' secretary Proclus provided literary assistance for his bishop in these endeavours. Proclus' famous Homily 1 delivered in Constantinople in 430 "defined the rhetoric and rationale for the cult of the Virgin Mary throughout the Byzantine period", "attained de facto canonical status" after it was attached to the proceedings of the Ephesine Council, and was the basis of centuries of theological re-imagining and reflection. According to Constas, the sermon together with its associated Marian Feast "mark an important juncture in the development of the cult of the Virgin in Constantinople". The text interweaves resplendent praises of Mary with celebration of female virginity, directly confronting Nestorius' two-pronged criticisms of local Marian piety and the Empress Pulcheria.

Proclus was a champion of the traditional title Theotokos, defending its usage with intertwined Christological and Mariological explication, and also upheld the doctrine of the perpetual virginity. Likewise, he taught the traditional Eve-Mary parallel that had been current in Christian theology since the second century. One of the primary texts he cites to support this is Ezekiel 44:1–2, interpreting the closed gate of the sanctuary typologically, in continuity with 4th-century figures like the Cappadocians who laid the foundation for the rhetorical praise of the sacred womb. Proclus' Mariology is an extension of his Christology, whereby the mystery of virginal motherhood safeguards the mystery of the incarnation, rendering Mary and her qualities worthy of effulgent praise. His repertoire, drawing upon existing traditions through expansion, became foundational to Byzantine Mariology, drawing liberally on Old Testament stories, some of which were corrolaries of Christological typologies. Among others images, the Virgin is the spiritual Garden of Eden in which dwells the second Adam, the New Eve who cancels the disobedience of the first, the Ark who carried the spiritual Noah, the ladder of Jacob by which God descends and man ascends, the Fleece of Gideon drenched with the dew of heaven, the burning bush ablaze but not consumed by divinity, and the throne of the Cherubim on which rests the glory of God. She is a harbour, a sea, a palace, a bridal chamber, she is more spacious than heaven, a valley blossoming with fruit to feed the world and her womb is wider than the heavens. These images are drawn together in a context of active veneration; in his homily of 430, Proclus associates the calling together of the congregation before him via land and sea with the agency of Mary. Shoemaker identifies word for word correspondence between Proclus' Homily 1 and a Marian hymn contained within the Georgian Chantbook of Jerusalem, compiled prior to the mid-6th century. He argues on the basis of theological content that the hymn was already extant by 430 and that Proclus was quoting it, which indicates pre-existing Marian piety between Jerusalem and Constantinople upon which the bishop drew for his rhetorical purposes.

His sermons also bristle with Marian theology through innovative allegorical interpretation of Old Testament texts such as the prophetic lampstand in Zechariah. According to Proclus, Mary is "the only bridge between God and men" and all women are blessed through her renewal of the female sex.

== Works ==
The works of Proclus consist of 20 sermons (some of doubtful authenticity). Five were published by cardinal Angelo Mai, of which 3 are preserved only in a Syriac version, the Greek being lost; 7 letters, along with several addressed to him by other persons; and a few fragments of other letters and sermons. Of the 8 homilies on Christology attributed to him, 7 are authentic.

Proclus was cited by Cardinal John Henry Newman for his work on Mariology and his strong support of the conciliar dogma on the Theotokos.

Five of his homilies have been translated into English by Fr. Maximos (Nicholas) Constas in Vigiliae Christianae, Supplements, Volume: 66 by Brill in 2002.

== Feast day ==
The Eastern Orthodox Church and the Oriental Orthodox Churches celebrate his feast day on 20 November. The Catholic Church lists him on 24 October.

== Notes and references ==
=== Attribution ===
Titles of the Great Christian Church
Preceded by Maximianus	Archbishop of Constantinople; 434 – 446	Succeeded by Flavian
