= Synod of the Oak =

403 provincial synod in Constantinople

The Synod of the Oak was a provincial synod, held in Drys, Constantinople in July of 403, which condemned and deposed John Chrysostom as Patriarch of Constantinople.

This council, organized by his enemies, deposed John Chrysostom, patriarch of Constantinople and also attacked Heraclides, bishop of Ephesus, whom Chrysostom had elected at Ephesus. It seems to be politically motivated and a conspiracy is to be considered.

It was presided over by Theophilus of Alexandria, Acacius of Beroea, Antiochos of Ptolemais, Severian of Gabala and Cyrinus of Chalcedon. Cyril of Alexandria also participated with his uncle.

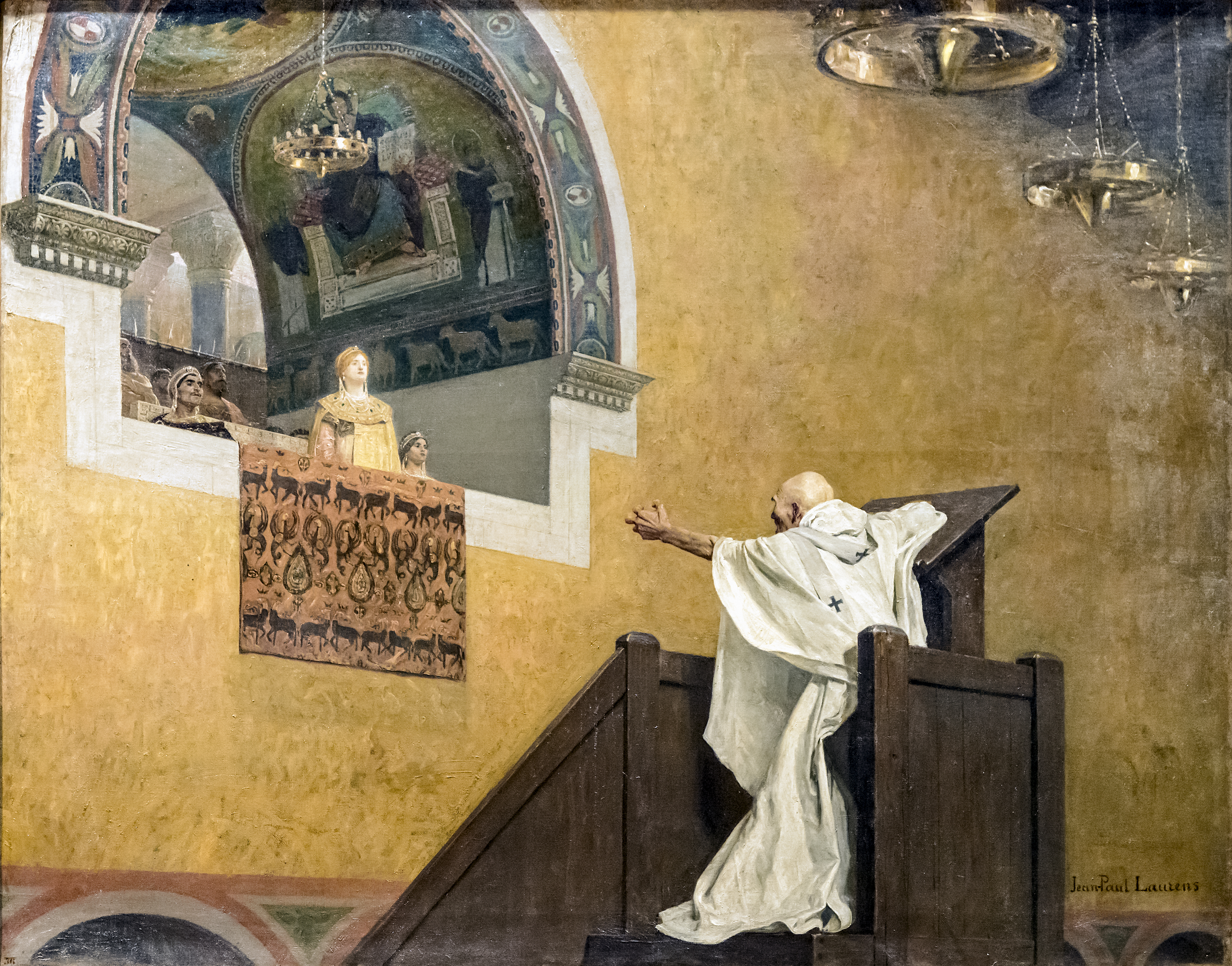
Chrysostom and Eudoxia. Painting by Jean-Paul Laurens.

== Preamble ==
In the year 402, Theophilus had been summoned by the emperor to Constantinople to apologize before a synod, over which Chrysostom would preside, on account of several charges which were brought against him by certain Egyptian monks, especially by the so-called four "Tall Brothers". Theophilus, their former friend, had suddenly turned against them, and had them persecuted as Origenists. Placing himself at the head of soldiers and armed servants Theophilus marched against the monks, burned their dwellings, and ill-treated those whom he captured.

When these monks fled to Constantinople to appeal to Patriarch John, Theophilus wrote to St. Epiphanius of Cyprus, requesting him to go to and prevail upon Chrysostom to condemn the Origenists. Epiphanius went, but when he realized that Theophilus was merely using him for his own purposes, he left the capital, dying on his return in 403. At this time Chrysostom delivered a sermon against the vain luxury of women. It was reported to the empress as though Chrysostom had been referring to her personally, which only embittered her more against the Patriarch.

== Participants ==
In addition to Theophilus of Alexandria, Cyril of Alexandria, Acacius of Beroea, Antiochos of Ptolemais, Severian of Gabala and Cyrinus of Chalcedon, Paul of Heraclea and Arsacius of Tarsus also participated, Arsacius was merely an archpriest, but served as one of the accusers.

== The synod ==
Theophilus at last appeared at Constantinople in June, 403, not alone, as he had been commanded, but with twenty-nine of his suffragan bishops, and, as Palladius tells us, with a good deal of money and all sorts of gifts. His nephew and successor Cyril also accompanied him to the synod. Theophilus took his lodgings in one of the imperial palaces, and held conferences with all the adversaries of Chrysostom. Then he retired with his suffragans and seven other bishops to a villa near Constantinople, called Epi Dryn. A long list of around thirty accusations was drawn up against Chrysostom, which are, for the first ten :

- 1. He was accused of having whipped and chained a monk named John.
- 2. He was accused of selling Church property.
- 3. He was accused of having sold the marble that Nectarios of Constantinople set aside for the church of Saint Anastasius.
- 4. He was accused of insulting the clergy as "dishonorable, corrupt, useless in themselves and worthless".
- 5. He was accused of calling Saint Epiphanius an idiot and a demon.
- 6. He was accused of having intrigued against Severian of Gabala.
- 7. He was accused of having written a defamatory book against the clergy.
- 8. He was accused of having assembled the members of the clergy, and accused three deacons, Acacius, Edaphus and John, on a charge of stealing his hood (scapular or omophorion, the Greek is not precise).
- 9. He was accused of having consecrated Antony as a bishop, although he was found guilty of plundering the tombs.
- 10. He was accused of having denounced Count John during a seditious meeting of the troops.

The synod now consisted of forty-two archbishops and bishops, many of whom were Syrian and Egyptian bishops inimical to him brought by Theophilus. So now the synod, assembled to judge Theophilus in accordance with the orders of the emperor, now summoned Chrysostom to present himself and apologize. Severian, Bishop of Gabala in Syria, whom Chrysostom had previously ordered to leave Constantinople because of his involvement in controversy with the deacon Sarapion, served as prosecutor. Chrysostom refused to recognize the legality of a synod in which his open enemies were judges. After the third summons Chrysostom, with the consent of the emperor, was declared to be deposed. In order to avoid useless bloodshed, he surrendered himself on the third day to the soldiers who awaited him. But the threats of the excited people, and a sudden "accident in the imperial palace" (in fact a miscarriage), frightened the empress. She feared some punishment from heaven for Chrysostom's exile, and immediately ordered his recall. After some hesitation, Chrysostom re-entered the capital amid the great rejoicing of the people. Theophilus and his party saved themselves by fleeing from Constantinople.

== Aftermath ==
Chrysostom's enemies, though, did not rest, and soon succeeded in having him deposed and exiled a second time, on 24 June 404. Saint John Chrysostom's last words, delivered as he lay dying on the road to exile, were "Glory be to God for all things!"
