= Stephen Morris (theologian) =

Stephen Morris is an Eastern Orthodox minister and author.

== Works ==
- Morris, Stephen (2016). "When Brothers Dwell in Unity": Byzantine Christianity and Homosexuality. McFarland. ISBN 978-1-4766-2214-9.
- Morris, Stephen (2018). The Early Eastern Orthodox Church: A History, AD 60-1453. McFarland. ISBN 978-1-4766-3422-7.
