= Helladius of Tarsus =

Helladius of Tarsus (Greek: Έλλάδιος ό Ταρσεύς) was a Christian bishop of Tarsus. He was condemned at the First Council of Ephesus (431) and appealed to the pope in 433.

Prior to the Council of Ephesus he had been a disciple of Theodocius of Antioch and following that was head of a monastery at Rhosus in Cilicia before being made a bishop.

Before the Council he was one of the voices who called for the council to be delayed until John of Antioch could arrive and one of the bishops who joined Johns counter Council.

At the Council he was voice of conciliation, taking a middle ground and keeping relations with both Parties in the Nestorian dispute. The victory of the Alexandrain/Roman factions saw his conciliatory stance as suspect and he was forced into excel for a few years after the council. He appealed to the Pope in Rome who restored him to his bishopric.

In 433 he held a Synod at Tarsus which anathamatised those who had anathamatised him and his fellow objectors.

Pressure from Theoderat and the emperor Theodosius caused him to retract his position much to the distress of his former allies.
