= Sisinnius I of Constantinople =

Archbishop of Constantinople from 426 to 427

- Archbishop of Constantinople
- Installed: 28 February 426
- Term ended: 24 December 427
- Predecessor: Atticus of Constantinople
- Successor: Nestorius of Constantinople

Personal details
- Died: 24 December 427
- Denomination: Eastern Christianity

Sisinnius I of Constantinople (Greek: Σισίνιος, Sisinios; died 24 December 427) was the Archbishop of Constantinople from 426 to 427.

Before the election, Sisinnius was priest in the area of Elaea (modern-day Cihangir) and had become known for his virtues and piety, as well as for acts of charity.

After the death of archbishop Atticus of Constantinople, the patriarch's throne was vacant for some time, as there was controversy about the choice of a successor. According to the dominant view, this period was about four months and ended with the election of Sisinnius on 28 February 426.

For the consecration and its establishment, the Eastern Roman emperor Theodosius II convened a meeting chaired by the patriarch of Antioch, Theodotus of Antioch.

In the days of the patriarch was in recession the question of the attitude of the followers of John Chrysostom, which occurred when he was exiled.

== Notes and references ==
Titles of the Great Christian Church
Preceded by Atticus	Archbishop of Constantinople; 426 – 427	Succeeded by Nestorius
