= Zeitschrift für Antikes Christentum =

Zeitschrift für Antikes Christentum / Journal of Ancient Christianity
- Discipline: Religion, classics
- Language: English, French, German

Publication details
- History: 1997-present
- Publisher: Walter de Gruyter (Germany)
- Frequency: Triannually

Standard abbreviations
- ISO 4: Z. Antikes Christ.

Indexing
- ISSN: 1612-961X
- OCLC no.: 48273923

Links
- Journal homepage

The Zeitschrift für Antikes Christentum / Journal of Ancient Christianity is an academic journal published by Walter de Gruyter. It covers topics related to early Christianity and Patristics.
