= Bishop of Tarsus =

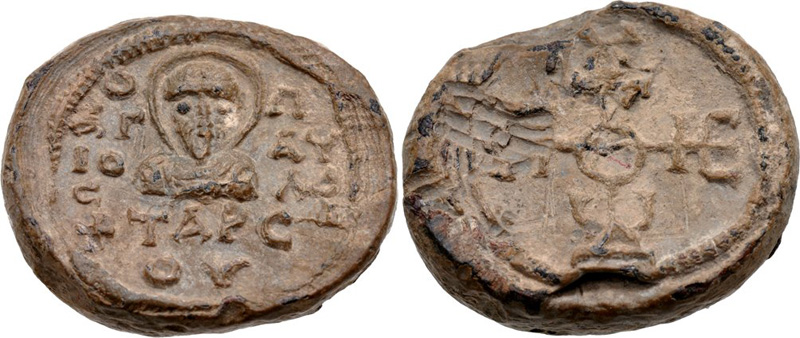
Lead seal of Theodore, Metropolitan of Tarsus (late 7th century)

The first recorded bishop of Tarsus, Helenus, went to Antioch several times in connection with the dispute concerning Paul of Samosata. Le Quien mentions twenty-two of its bishops, of whom several are legendary.

Tarsus was the metropolitan see of the province of Cilicia Prima, under the Patriarchate of Antioch. From the 6th century onwards, the metropolitan see of Tarsus had seven suffragan bishoprics (Échos d'Orient, X, 145).

The Eastern Orthodox Eparchy of Adana and Tarsus c. 1880 (outlined in brown)

The Eastern Orthodox Archdiocese of Tarsus (Échos d'Orient, X, 98), has existed throughout the Middle Ages and down to the modern times as part of the Eastern Orthodox Patriarchate of Antioch. In time it was merged with Adana, and in 2025 the ancient diocese was re-established as the Archdiocese of Tarsus, Adana, and Alexandretta by the Holy Synod of the Patriarchate of Antioch.

At about the end of the 10th century, the Armenians established a diocese of their rite; Saint Nerses of Lambron was its most distinguished representative in the 12th century.

Tarsus is included in the Catholic Church's list of titular sees as a metropolitan see of both the Latin, the Maronite and the Melkite Catholic Church.

The Church of the East had a diocese of Tarsus that was a suffragan of Damascus, but no incumbents are known by name.

== List of bishops ==
=== Early bishops ===
- Lupus, present at the Council of Ancyra in 314
- Theodorus, at the Council of Nicaea in 325
- Helladius, condemned at Ephesus, and who appealed to the pope in 433
- Diodorus, teacher of Theodore of Mopsuestia and consequently one of the fathers of Nestorianism.
- Nicholas, who was exiled about 525.
- Kaynon (fl. 560), heretical follower of Athanasius, grandson of Empress Theodora

=== Roman Catholic bishops ===
Bishops of the Latin Church:

- Roger (1099 – c.1108)
- Stephen (fl. 1135–1140)
- Albert (fl. 1186–1191)
