= John Chrysostom =

Archbishop of Constantinople (347–407)

Saint John Chrysostom
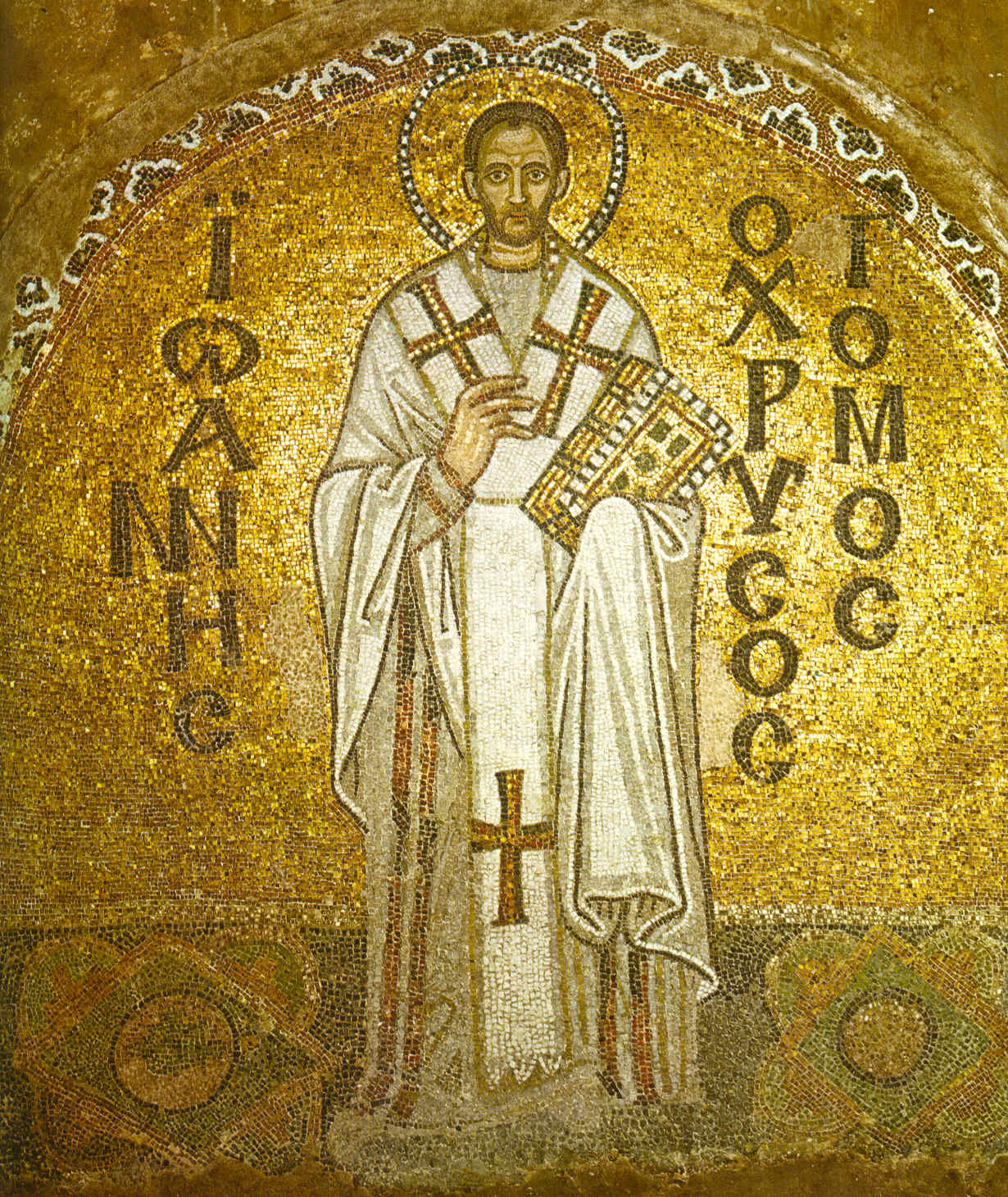
- Byzantine mosaic at the Hagia Sophia, late 10th century

East: Great Hierarch and Ecumenical Teacher; West: Bishop and Doctor of the Church
- Born: c. 347 (Note: The exact date of John's birth is in question, and dates between 344 and 349 are given. In the most recent general biography of Chrysostom, eminent patristics scholar John Norman Davidson Kelly, after a review of the evidence and literature, favours 349 as the date that best fits all available evidence, in agreement with Robert Carter. See Kelly, Golden Mouth: (He was named Chrysostom because that means Golder mouth) The Story of John Chrysostom - Ascetic, Preacher, Bishop, (Grand Rapids, Baker Academic 1998, originally published Ithaca, Cornell University Press, 1995), p. 4 fn. 12; esp. Appendix B passim. For a discussion of alternatives presented in the literature, see Robert Carter, "The Chronology of St. John Chrysostom's Early Life", in Traditio 18:357–364 (1962); Jean Dumortier, "La valeur historique du dialogue de Palladius et la chronologie de saint Jean Chrysostome", in Mélanges de science religieuse, 8:51–56 (1951). Carter dates his birth to the year 349. See also Wilken 2004, p. 5); Antioch, Roman Syria, Roman Empire
- Died: 14 September 407 (aged 59–60); Comana, Diocese of Pontus, Eastern Roman Empire
- Venerated in: Catholic Church; Eastern Orthodox; Oriental Orthodoxy; Church of the East; Anglican Communion; Lutheranism
- Canonized: Pre-congregational
- Feast: {{ubl|Byzantine Rite: 13 September (Departure); 13 November (Celebration transferred from 13 September); 27 January (Translation of relics); 30 January (Three Holy Hierarchs)
- Attributes: Vested as a bishop, holding a Gospel Book or scroll, right hand raised in blessing. He is depicted as emaciated from fasting, with a high forehead, balding with dark hair and a small beard. Symbols: beehive, a white dove, a pan, chalice on a bible, pen and inkhorn
- Patronage: Constantinople, education, epilepsy, lecturers, public speakers, preachers

John Chrysostom (/ˈkrɪsəstəm, krɪˈsɒstəm/; Koine Greek: Ἰωάννης ὁ Χρυσόστομος, romanized: Iōánnēs ho Chrysóstomos, IPA: [i.oˈannis o xryˈsostomos]; Latin: Ioannes Chrysostomus, Ecclesiastical Latin: [joˈannes kriˈzɔstomus]; Syriac: ܝܘܚܢܢ ܦܘܡܐ ܕܕܗܘܐ (Yōḥannan Pumā d-Dahbā); English: John the Golden-mouthed; c. 347 – 14 September 407) was a Church Father who served as Archbishop of Constantinople. He is known for his preaching and public speaking, particularly on the poor, his Divine Liturgy of Saint John Chrysostom, and his ascetic sensibilities.

He is honored as a saint in the Catholic and Eastern churches, as well as in some others. The Eastern Orthodox, together with the Byzantine Catholics, hold him in special regard as one of the Three Holy Hierarchs (alongside Basil of Caesarea and Gregory of Nazianzus). Along with them and Athanasius of Alexandria he is also regarded by the Catholic Church as one of the four Great Greek Church Fathers.

== Biography ==
=== Early life ===
John was born in Antioch, Roman Syria (modern-day Antakya, Hatay, Turkey) in 347. Different scholars describe his mother Anthusa as a pagan or as a Christian. Christian tradition generally describes his mother as a devout Christian. His father was a high-ranking military officer. John's father died soon after his birth and he was raised by his mother. He was baptised in 368 or 373, (Note: Wilken 2004, p. 7 prefers 368 for the date of Chrysostom's baptism, the Encyclopaedia Judaica prefers the later date of 373) and tonsured as a reader (one of the minor orders of the Church). It is sometimes said that he was bitten by a snake when he was ten years old, resulting in infection from the bite.

=== Education ===
As a result of his mother's influential connections in the city, John began his education under the rhetorician Libanius in the Sophist school. From Libanius, John acquired the skills for a career in rhetoric, as well as a love of the Greek language and literature. Eventually, he became a lawyer.

As he grew older, however, John became more deeply committed to Christianity and went on to study theology under Diodorus of Tarsus, founder of the reconstituted School of Antioch. According to the Christian historian Sozomen, Libanius was supposed to have said on his deathbed that John would have been his successor "if the Christians had not taken him from us".

John lived in extreme asceticism and became a hermit in about 375; he spent the next two years continually standing, scarcely sleeping, and committing the Bible to memory. As a consequence of these practices, his stomach and kidneys were permanently damaged and poor health forced him to return to Antioch.

=== Diaconate and service in Antioch ===
John was first appointed as a reader in the church of Antioch by Zeno of Verona upon the latter's return from Jerusalem. Later, he was ordained as a deacon in 381 by the bishop Meletius of Antioch who was not then in communion with Alexandria and Rome. After the death of Meletius, John separated himself from the followers of Meletius, without joining Paulinus II of Antioch, the rival of Meletius for the bishopric of Antioch. But after the death of Paulinus II (388) he was ordained a presbyter (priest) by Evagrius of Antioch, the successor of Paulinus by the Eustathius of Antioch faction in the city. He was destined later to bring about reconciliation between Flavian I of Antioch, Alexandria, and Rome, thus bringing those three sees into communion for the first time in nearly seventy years.

In Antioch, over the course of twelve years (386–397), John gained popularity because of the eloquence of his public speaking at the Golden Church, Antioch's cathedral, especially his insightful expositions of Bible passages and moral teaching. The most valuable of his works from this period are his homilies on various books of the Bible. He emphasised charitable giving and was concerned with the spiritual and temporal needs of the poor. He spoke against abuse of wealth and personal property:

Do you wish to honour the body of Christ? Do not ignore him when he is naked. Do not pay him homage in the temple clad in silk, only then to neglect him outside where he is cold and ill-clad. He who said: "This is my body" is the same who said: "You saw me hungry and you gave me no food", and "Whatever you did to the least of my brothers you did also to me"... What good is it if the Eucharistic table is overloaded with golden chalices when your brother is dying of hunger? Start by satisfying his hunger and then with what is left you may adorn the altar as well.

His straightforward understanding of the Scriptures – in contrast to the Alexandrian tendency towards allegorical interpretation – meant that the themes of his talks were practical, explaining the Bible's application to everyday life. Such straightforward preaching helped Chrysostom to garner popular support.

One incident that happened during his service in Antioch illustrates the influence of his homilies. When Chrysostom arrived in Antioch, Flavian, the bishop of the city, had to intervene with emperor Theodosius I on behalf of citizens who had gone on a rampage mutilating statues of the emperor and his family. During the weeks of Lent in 387, John preached more than twenty homilies in which he entreated the people to see the error of their ways. These made a lasting impression on the general population of the city: many pagans converted to Christianity as a result of the homilies. The city was ultimately spared from severe consequences.

=== Archbishop of Constantinople ===
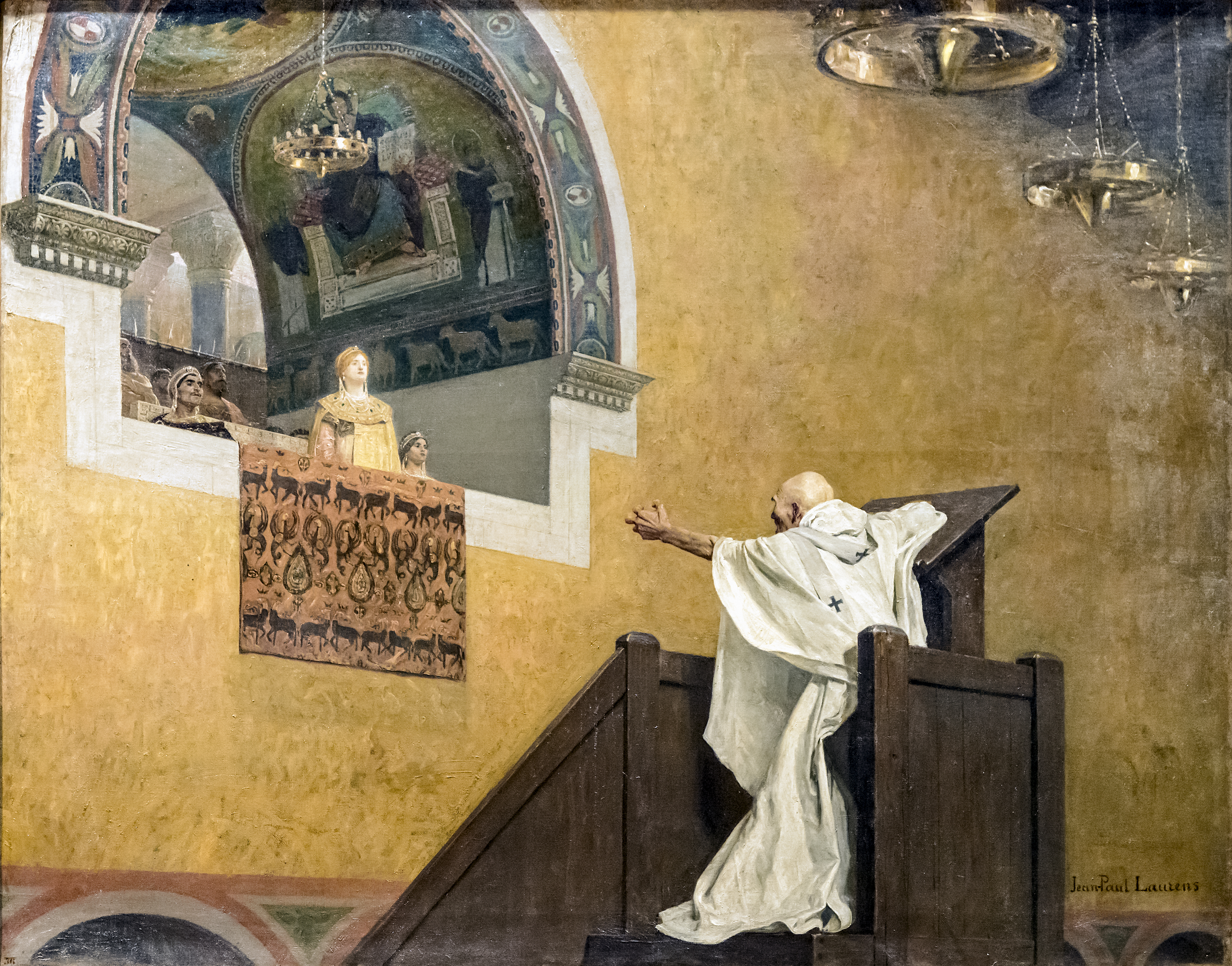
John Chrysostom confronting Aelia Eudoxia, in a 19th-century anti-clerical painting by Jean-Paul Laurens

In the autumn of 397, John was appointed archbishop of Constantinople, after having been nominated without his knowledge by the eunuch Eutropius. He had to leave Antioch in secret due to fears that the departure of such a popular figure would cause civil unrest.

During his time as archbishop, he adamantly refused to host lavish social gatherings, which made him popular with the common people, but unpopular with wealthy citizens and the clergy. His reforms of the clergy were also unpopular. He told visiting regional preachers to return to the churches they were meant to be serving – without any pay-out. He also founded a number of hospitals in Constantinople.

His time in Constantinople was more tumultuous than his time in Antioch. Theophilus I of Alexandria, the patriarch of Alexandria, wanted to bring Constantinople under his sway and opposed John's appointment to Constantinople. Theophilus had disciplined four Egyptian monks (known as "the Tall Brothers") over their support of Origen's teachings. They fled to John and were welcomed by him. Theophilus therefore accused John of being too partial to the teaching of Origen. He made another enemy in Aelia Eudoxia, wife of emperor Arcadius, who assumed that John's denunciations of extravagance in feminine dress were aimed at her. Eudoxia, Theophilus and other of his enemies held a synod in 403 (the Synod of the Oak) to charge John, in which his connection to Origen was used against him. It resulted in his deposition and banishment. He was called back by Arcadius almost immediately, as the people became "tumultuous" over his departure, even threatening to burn the imperial palace. There was an earthquake the night of his arrest, which Eudoxia took for a sign of God's anger, prompting her to ask Arcadius for John's reinstatement.

Peace was short-lived. A silver statue of Eudoxia was erected in the Augustaion, near the Constantinian Hagia Sophia, his cathedral. John denounced the dedication ceremonies as pagan and spoke against the empress in harsh terms: "Again Herodias raves, again she dances, and again desires to receive John's head on a charger", an allusion to the Biblical events surrounding the death of John the Baptist. Once again he was banished, this time to the Caucasus in Abkhazia. His banishment sparked riots among his supporters in the capital, and in the fighting the cathedral built by Constantius II was burnt down, necessitating the construction of the second cathedral on the site, the Theodosian Hagia Sophia.

Around 405, John began to lend moral and financial support to Christian monks who were enforcing the emperors' anti-pagan laws, by destroying temples and shrines in Phoenicia and nearby regions.

=== Exile and death ===
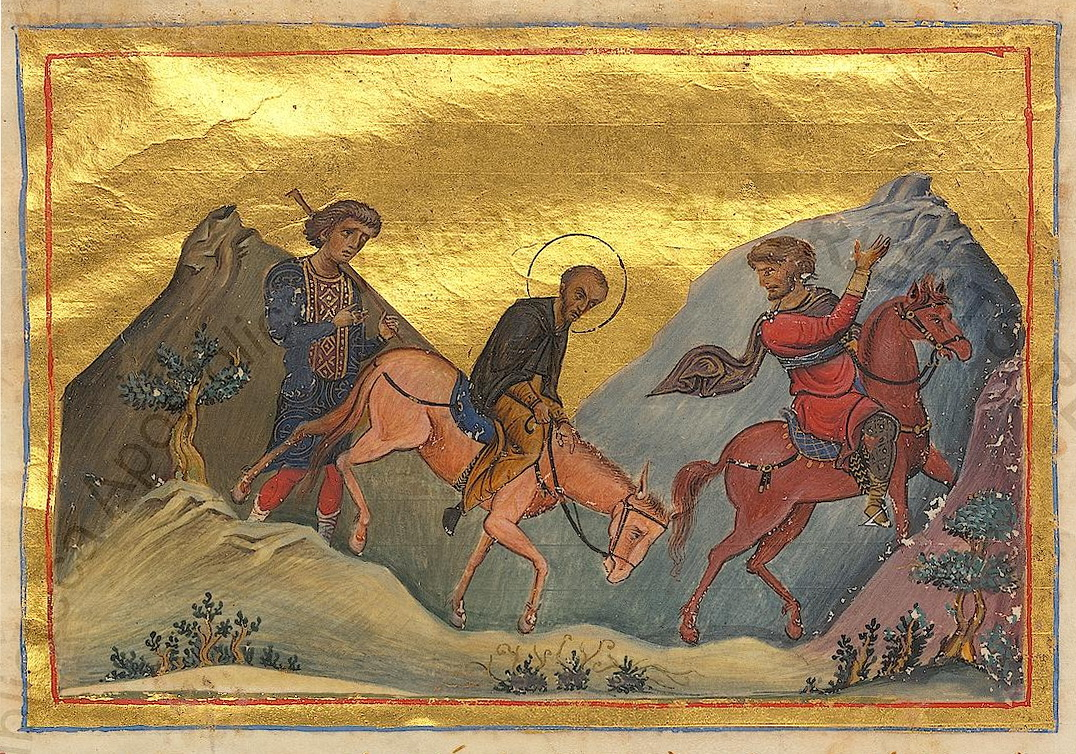
The exile of John Chrysostom; scene from the 11th-century Menologion of Basil II

Several historians, including Wendy Mayer and Geoffrey Dunn, have argued that "the surplus of evidence reveals a struggle between Johannite and anti-Johannite camps in Constantinople soon after John's departure and for a few years after his death". Faced with exile, John Chrysostom wrote an appeal for help to three churchmen: Pope Innocent I; Venerius, the bishop of Mediolanum (Milan); and Chromatius, the bishop of Aquileia. In 1872, church historian William Stephens wrote:

The Patriarch of the Eastern Rome appeals to the great bishops of the West, as the champions of an ecclesiastical discipline which he confesses himself unable to enforce or to see any prospect of establishing. No jealousy is entertained of the Patriarch of the Old Rome by the patriarch of the New Rome. The interference of Innocent is courted, a certain primacy is accorded him, but at the same time he is not addressed as a supreme arbitrator; assistance and sympathy are solicited from him as from an elder brother, and two other prelates of Italy are joint recipients with him of the appeal.

Pope Innocent I protested John's banishment from Constantinople to the town of Cucusus (Göksun) in Cappadocia, but to no avail. Innocent sent a delegation to intercede on behalf of John in 405. It was led by Gaudentius of Brescia; Gaudentius and his companions, two bishops, encountered many difficulties and never reached their goal of entering Constantinople.

John wrote letters which still held great influence in Constantinople. As a result of this, he was further exiled from Cucusus (where he stayed from 404 to 407) to Pitiunt (Pityus) (in modern Georgia). He never reached this destination alive, as he died at Comana Pontica (modern-day Gümenek, Tokat, Turkey) on 14 September 407 during the journey. He died in the Presbyterium or community of the clergy belonging to the church of Saint Basiliscus of Comana. His last words are said to have been "Δόξα τῷ Θεῷ πάντων ἕνεκεν" ("Glory be to God for all things").

=== Veneration and canonisation ===
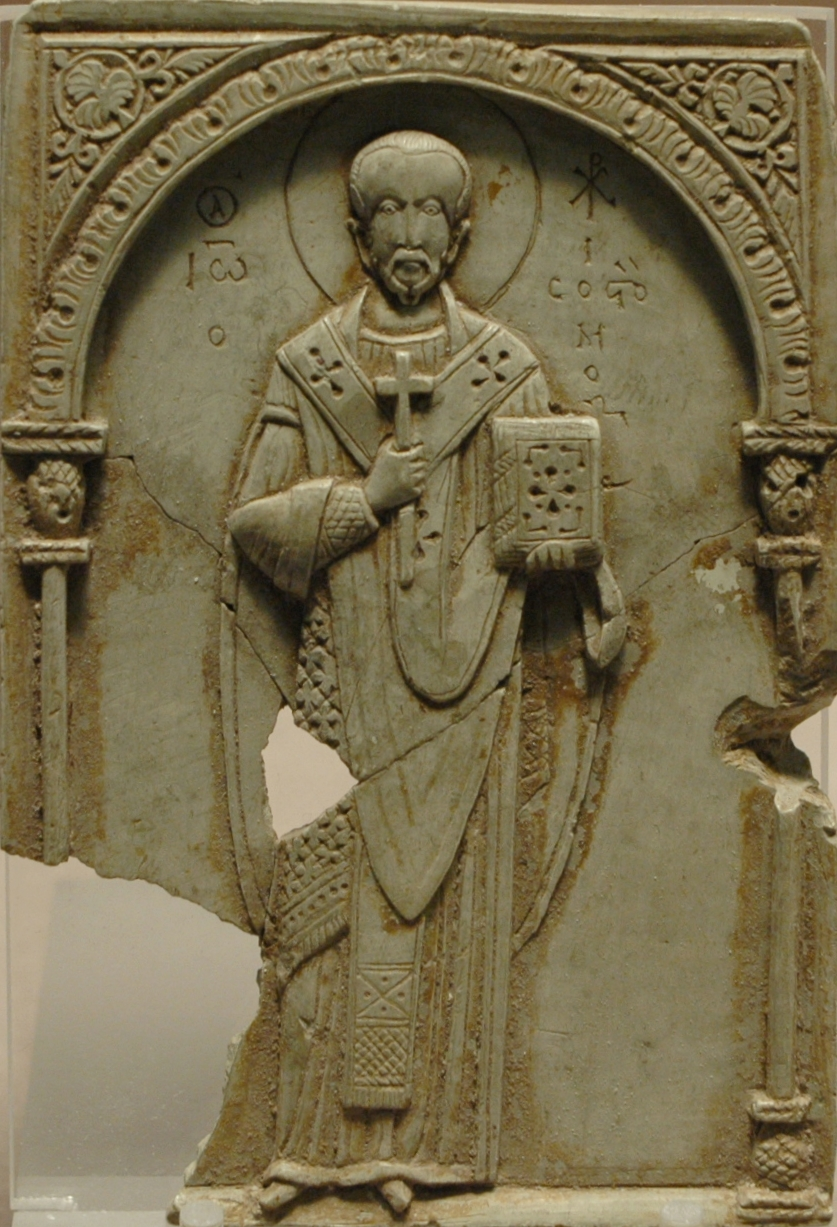
Byzantine 11th-century soapstone relief of John Chrysostom, Louvre

John came to be venerated as a saint soon after his death. Almost immediately after, an anonymous supporter of John (known as pseudo-Martyrius) wrote a funeral oration to reclaim John as a symbol of Christian orthodoxy. But three decades later, some of his adherents in Constantinople remained in schism. Proclus, archbishop of Constantinople (434–446), hoping to bring about the reconciliation of the Johannites, preached a homily praising his predecessor in the Church of Hagia Sophia. He said, "O John, your life was filled with sorrow, but your death was glorious. Your grave is blessed and reward is great, by the grace and mercy of our Lord Jesus Christ O graced one, having conquered the bounds of time and place! Love has conquered space, unforgetting memory has annihilated the limits, and place does not hinder the miracles of the saint."

These homilies helped to mobilize public opinion, and the patriarch received permission from the emperor to return Chrysostom's relics to Constantinople, where they were enshrined in the Church of the Holy Apostles on 28 January 438. The Eastern Orthodox Church commemorates him as a "Great Ecumenical Teacher", with Basil of Caesarea and Gregory of Nazianzus. These three saints, in addition to having their own individual commemorations throughout the year, are commemorated together on 30 January, a feast known as the Synaxis of the Three Hierarchs.

In the Eastern Orthodox Church, there are several feast days dedicated to him:

- 27 January, Translation of the relics of Saint John Chrysostom from Comana to Constantinople.
- 30 January, Synaxis of the Three Great Hierarchs.
- 14 September, Repose of Saint John Chrysostom.
- 13 November, celebration was transferred from 14 September by the 10th century AD as the Exaltation of the Holy Cross became more prominent. According to Brian Croke, 13 November is the date news of John Chrysostom's death reached Constantinople.

In 1908 Pope Pius X named him the patron saint of preachers.

== Writings ==
Some 600 sermons and 246 letters by John Chrysostom survive, as well as a commentary on the Book of Acts.

=== Homilies ===
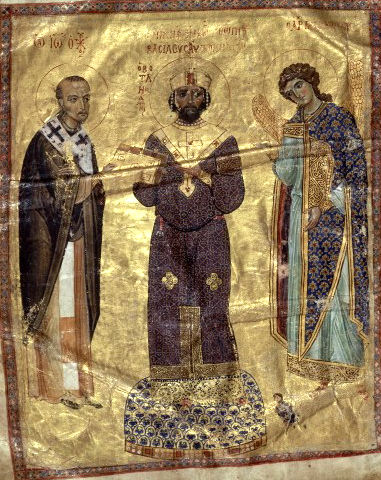
The Byzantine emperor Nicephorus III receives a book of homilies from John Chrysostom; the Archangel Michael stands on his left (11th-century illuminated manuscript).

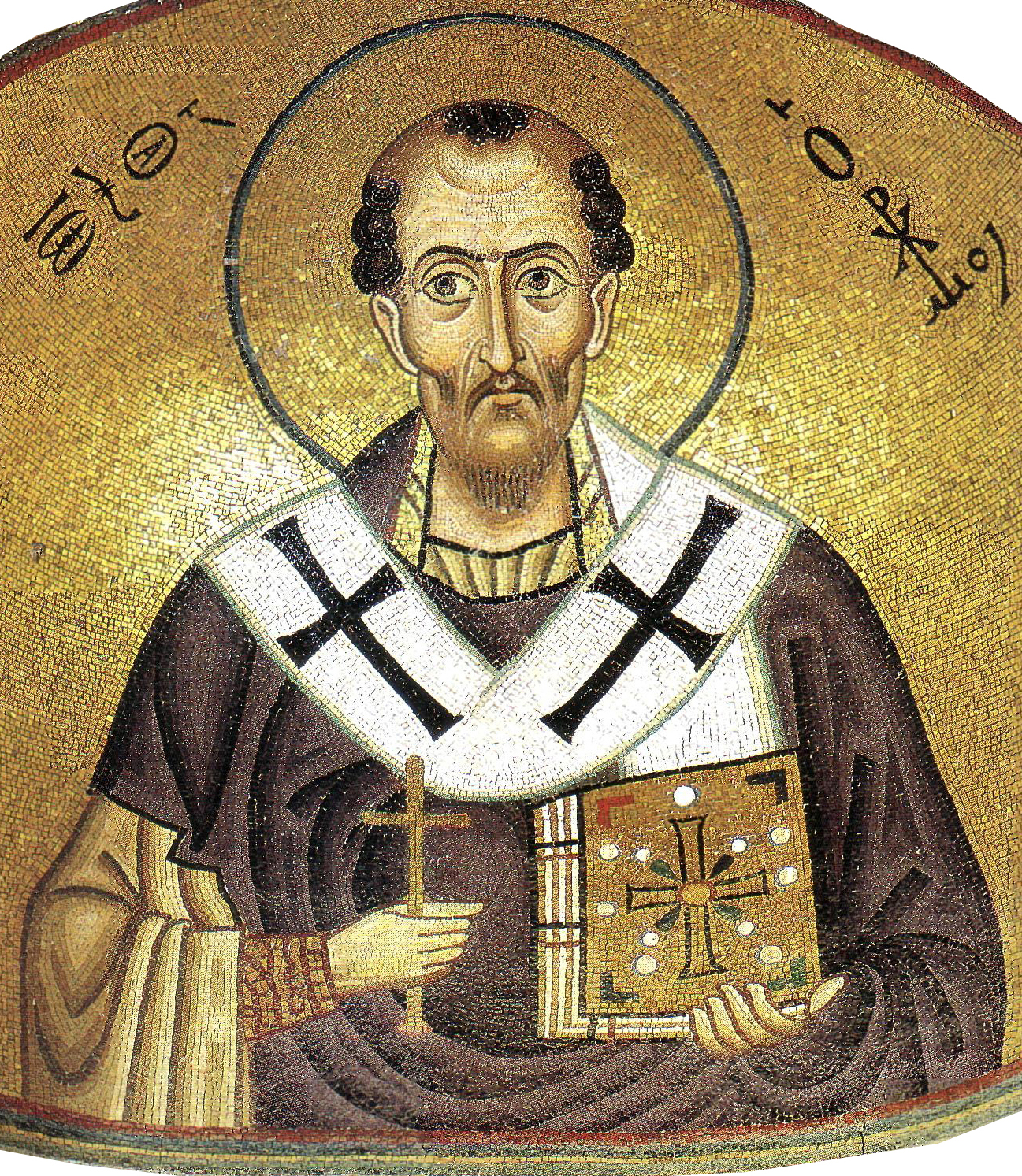
11th-century conch mosaic of John Chrysostom from the south-east apse of the nave of the Hosios Loukas monastery

==== General ====
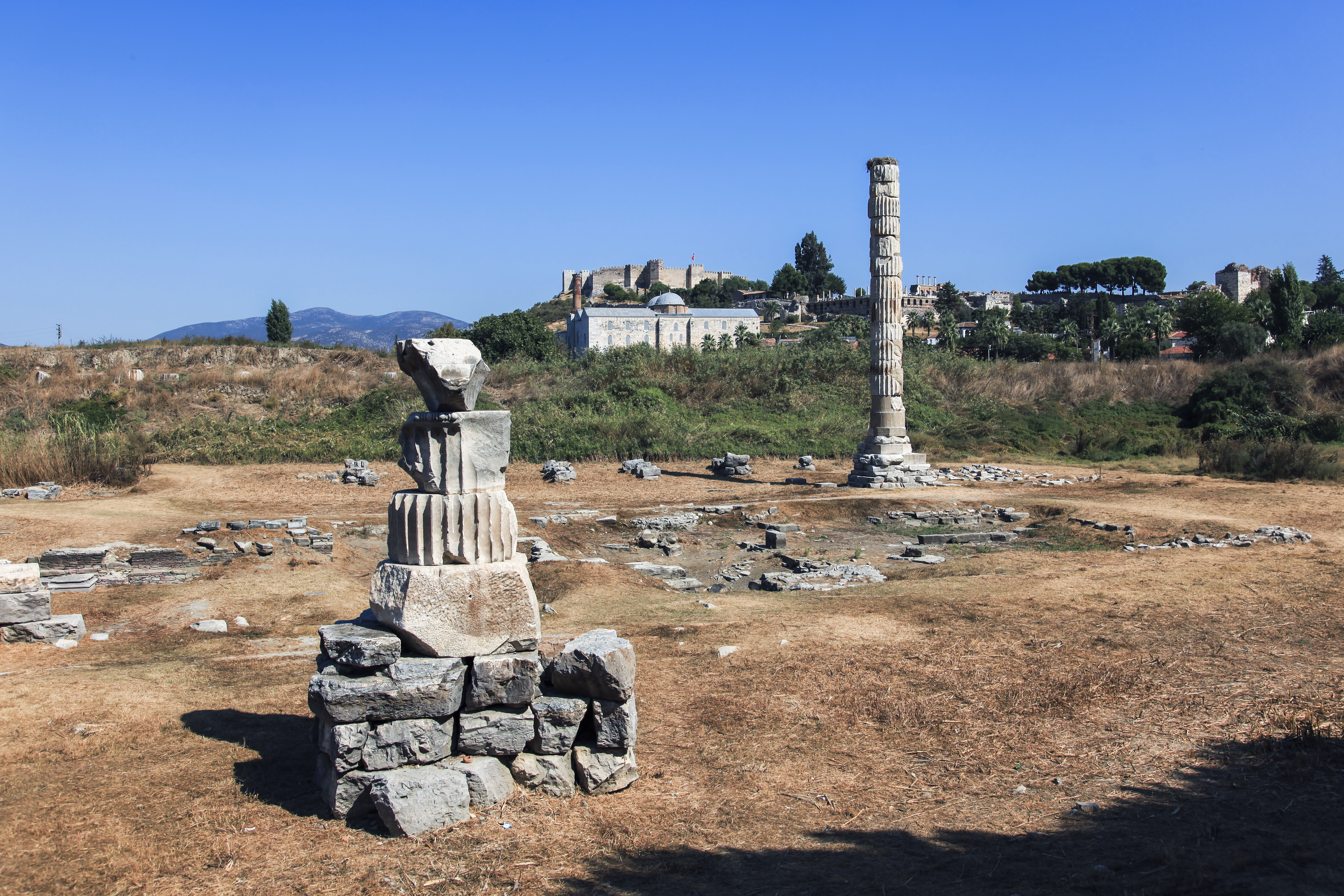
The remains of the Temple of Artemis in Ephesus, the destruction of which has been attributed to John Chrysostom

Chrysostom's extant homiletical works are vast, including many hundreds of exegetical homilies on both the New Testament (especially the works of Paul the Apostle) and the Old Testament (particularly on Genesis). Among his exegetical works are sixty-seven homilies on Genesis, fifty-nine on the Psalms, ninety on the Gospel of Matthew, eighty-eight on the Gospel of John, and fifty-five on the Acts of the Apostles. The best known of his many homilies is an extremely brief one, the Paschal Homily (Hieratikon), which is read at the first service of Pascha (Easter), the midnight Orthros (Matins), in the Eastern Orthodox Church.

The homilies were written down by stenographers and subsequently circulated, revealing a style that tended to be direct and greatly personal, but formed by the rhetorical conventions of his time and place. In general, his homiletical theology displays many characteristics of the Antiochian school (i.e., more literal in interpreting biblical events), but he also uses a good deal of the allegorical interpretation more associated with the Alexandrian school.

John's social and religious world was formed by the continuing and pervasive presence of paganism in the life of the city. One of his regular topics was the paganism in the culture of Constantinople, and in his homilies, he thunders against popular pagan amusements: the theatre, horseraces, and the revelry surrounding holidays. In particular, he criticizes Christians for taking part in such activities:

If you ask [Christians] who is Amos or Obadiah, how many apostles there were or prophets, they stand mute; but if you ask them about the horses or drivers, they answer with more solemnity than sophists or rhetors.

Cyril of Alexandria attributed the destruction of the Ephesian Temple of Artemis to John Chrysostom, referring to him as "the destroyer of the demons and overthrower of the temple of Diana". A later Archbishop of Constantinople, Proclus of Constantinople repeated the allegation, saying "In Ephesus, he despoiled the art of Midas". Both claims are considered spurious.

==== Care of the needy ====
One of the recurring features of John's homilies is his emphasis on care for the needy: he was "perhaps the most ardent preacher on social justice" of all the eastern fathers. Echoing themes found in the Gospel of Matthew, he calls upon the rich to lay aside materialism in favor of helping the poor, often employing all of his rhetorical skills to shame wealthy people to abandon conspicuous consumption:

Do you pay such honor to your excrements as to receive them into a silver chamber-pot when another man made in the image of God is perishing in the cold?

Along these lines, he wrote often about the need for almsgiving and its importance alongside fasting and prayer, e.g. "prayer without almsgiving is unfruitful".

==== Homilies against Jews and Judaizing Christians ====
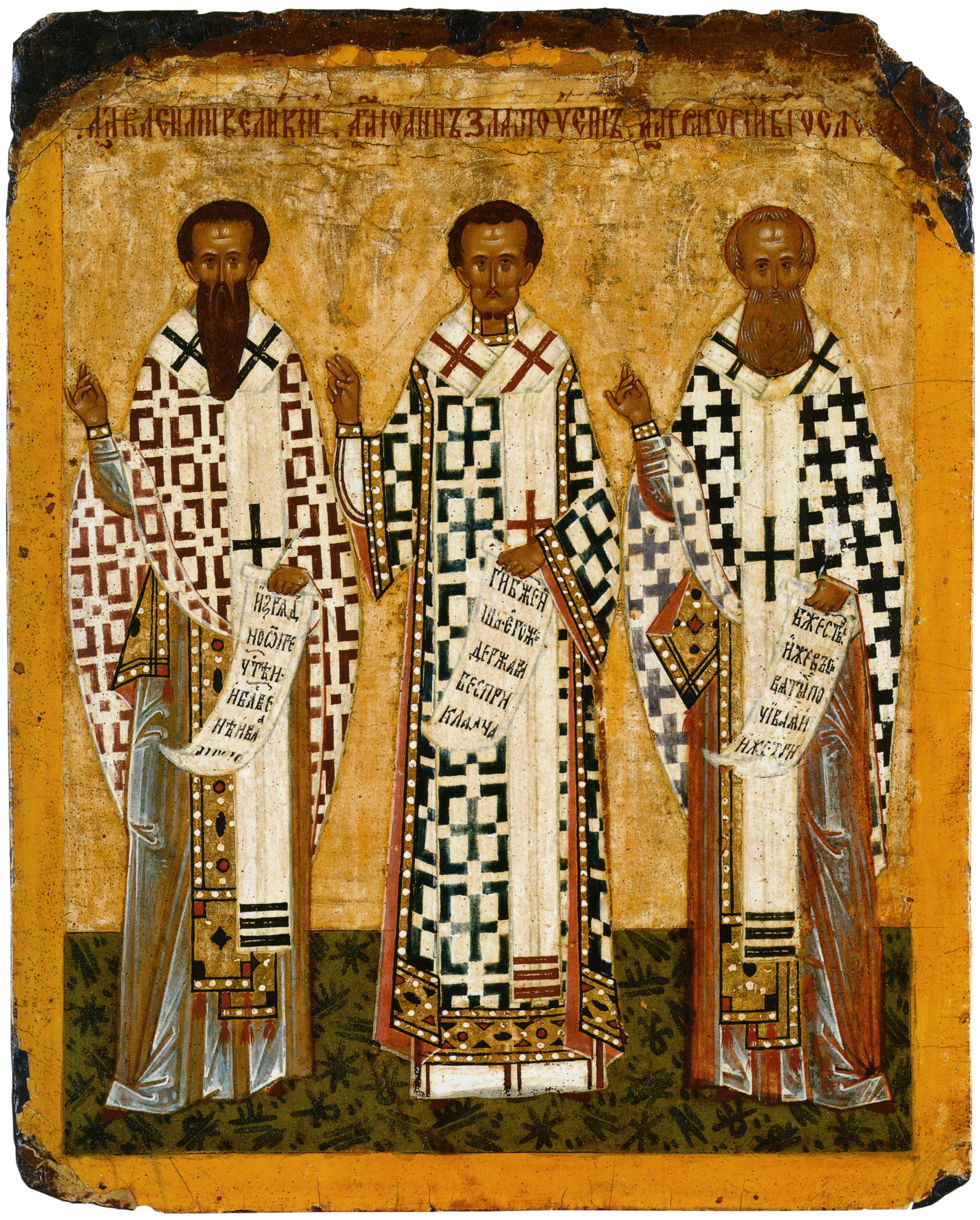
John Chrysostom with Basil of Caesarea and Gregory of Nazianzus on a late-15th-century icon of the Three Holy Hierarchs from the Cathedral of St Sophia, Novgorod

During his first two years as a presbyter in Antioch (386–387), John denounced Jews and Christians in a series of eight homilies delivered to Christians in his congregation who were taking part in Jewish festivals and other Jewish observances. It is disputed whether the main targets were specifically the so called "Judaizers" or Jews in general. His homilies were expressed in the conventional manner, using the uncompromising rhetorical form known as the psogos (Greek: blame, censure).

One of the purposes of these homilies was to prevent Christians from participating in Jewish customs, and thus prevent the perceived erosion of Chrysostom's flock. In his homilies, John criticized those "Judaizing Christians", who were participating in Jewish festivals and taking part in other Jewish observances, such as the shabbat, submitted to circumcision and made pilgrimage to Jewish holy places. There had been a revival of Jewish faith and tolerance in Antioch in 361, so Chrysostom's followers and the greater Christian community were in contact with Jews frequently, and Chrysostom was concerned that this interaction would draw Christians away from their faith identity.

John claimed that synagogues were full of Christians, especially Christian women, on the shabbats and Jewish festivals, because they loved the solemnity of the Jewish liturgy and enjoyed listening to the shofar on Rosh Hashanah, and applauded famous preachers in accordance with the contemporary custom. Due to Chrysostom's stature in the Christian church, both locally and within the greater church hierarchy, his sermons were fairly successful in spreading anti-Jewish sentiment.

In Greek, the homilies are called Kata Ioudaiōn (Κατὰ Ἰουδαίων), which is translated as Adversus Judaeos in Latin and "Against the Jews" in English. The original Benedictine editor of the homilies, Bernard de Montfaucon, gives the following footnote to the title: "A discourse against the Jews; but it was delivered against those who were Judaizing and keeping the fasts with them [the Jews]".

According to Patristics scholars, opposition to any particular view during the late 4th century was conventionally expressed in a manner, using the rhetorical form known as the psogos, whose literary conventions were to vilify opponents in an uncompromising manner; thus, it has been argued that to call Chrysostom an "anti-Semite" is to employ anachronistic terminology in a way incongruous with historical context and record. This does not preclude assertions that Chrysostom's theology was a form of anti-Jewish supersessionism.

His sermons against Jews gave further momentum to the idea that Jews are collectively responsible for the death of Jesus.

==== Homily against homosexuality ====
John Chrysostom's most notable discourse in this regard is his fourth homily on Romans 1:26, where he argues as follows:

All these affections then were vile, but chiefly the mad lust after males; for the soul is more the sufferer in sins, and more dishonored, than the body in diseases. ... [The men] have done an insult to nature itself. And a yet more disgraceful thing than these is it, when even the women seek after these intercourses, who ought to have more sense of shame than men.

He says the active male victimizes the passive male in a way that leaves him more enduringly dishonored than even a victim of murder since the victim of this act must "live under" the shame of the "insolency". The victim of a murder, by contrast, carries no dishonor. He asserts that punishment will be found in Hell for such transgressors and that women can be guilty of the sin as much as men. Chrysostom argues that the male passive partner has effectively renounced his manhood and become a woman – such an individual deserves to be "driven out and stoned". He attributes the cause to "luxury". "Do not, he means (Paul), because you have heard that they burned, suppose that the evil was only in desire. For the greater part of it came of their luxuriousness, which also kindled into flame their lust".

According to scholar Michael Carden, Chrysostom was particularly influential in shaping early Christian thought that same-sex desire was an evil, claiming that he altered a traditional interpretation of Sodom as a place of inhospitality to one where the sexual transgressions of the Sodomites became paramount. However, other scholars – such as Kruger and Nortjé-Meyer – dispute this, arguing that the author of the Epistle of Jude already interpreted the sin of Sodom as homosexuality in the New Testament.

Yet theologian Stephen Morris calls for a more nuanced interpretation of Chrysostom's attitude towards homosexuality, arguing that "it can be dangerous to assume that an opinion expressed in one homily or tract represents an author's attitude across his entire corpus or career, and Chrysostom's preaching is often situational," and noting that "not infrequently does he contradict himself."

=== Treatises ===
Apart from his homilies, a number of John's other treatises have had a lasting influence. One such work is John's early treatise Against Those Who Oppose the Monastic Life, written while he was a deacon (sometime before 386), which was directed to parents, pagan as well as Christian, whose sons were contemplating a monastic vocation. Chrysostom wrote that, already in his day, it was customary for Antiochenes to send their sons to be educated by monks.

Another important treatise written by John is titled On the Priesthood (written 390–391, it contains in Book 1 an account of his early years and a defence of his flight from ordination by bishop Meletius of Antioch, and then proceeds in later books to expound on his exalted understanding of the priesthood). Two other notable books by John are Instructions to Catechumens and On the Incomprehensibility of the Divine Nature. In addition, he wrote a series of letters to the deaconess Olympias, of which seventeen are extant.

=== Liturgy ===
Beyond his preaching, the other lasting legacy of John is his influence on Christian liturgy. Two of his writings are particularly notable. He harmonized the liturgical life of the church by revising the prayers and rubrics of the Divine Liturgy, or celebration of the Holy Eucharist. To this day, Eastern Orthodox and Eastern Catholic Churches of the Byzantine Rite typically celebrate the Divine Liturgy of Saint John Chrysostom as the normal Eucharistic liturgy, although his connection with it remains a matter of debate among experts.

== Legacy and influence ==
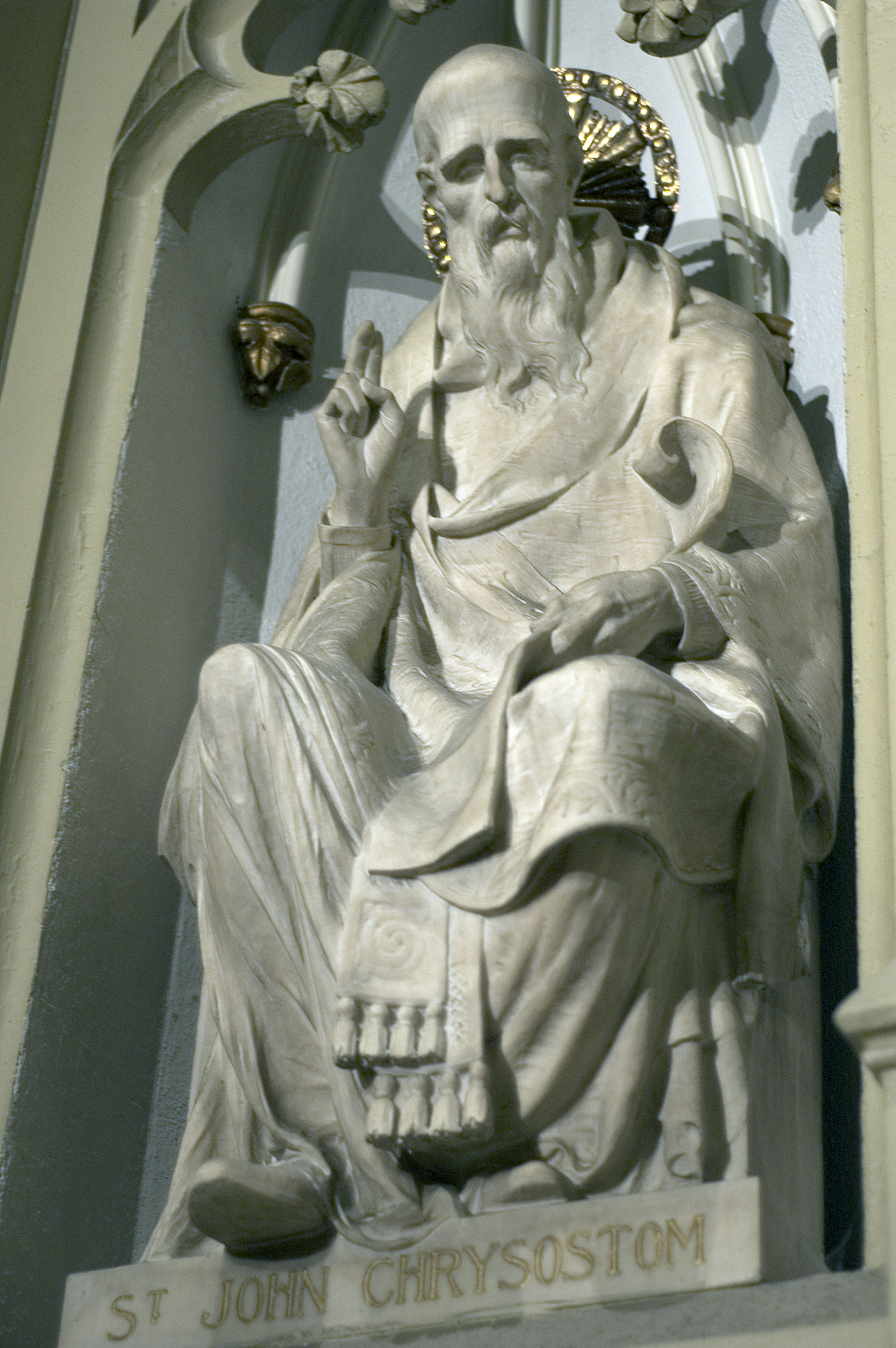
A sculpture of John Chrysostom in Saint Patrick's Cathedral, New York City

During a time when city clergy were subject to criticism for their high lifestyle, John was determined to reform his clergy in Constantinople. These efforts were met with resistance and limited success. He was seen as an excellent preacher whose homilies and writings are still studied and quoted. As a theologian, he has been and continues to be very important in Eastern Christianity, and is generally considered among the Three Holy Hierarchs of the Greek Church, but has been less important to Western Christianity. His writings have survived to the present day more so than any of the other Greek Fathers.

=== Catechism of the Catholic Church ===
The Catechism of the Catholic Church cites him in eighteen sections, particularly his reflections on the purpose of prayer and the meaning of the Lord's Prayer:

Consider how [Jesus Christ] teaches us to be humble, by making us see that our virtue does not depend on our work alone but on grace from on high. He commands each of the faithful who prays to do so universally, for the whole world. For he did not say "thy will be done in me or in us", but "on earth", the whole earth, so that error may be banished from it, truth take root in it, all vice be destroyed on it, virtue flourish on it, and earth no longer differ from heaven.

=== Protestant clergy ===
Protestant clerics, such as Richard Salter Storrs, refer to him as "one of the most eloquent preachers who ever since apostolic times have brought to men the divine tidings of truth and love", and the 19th-century John Henry Newman, a former Anglican but by this stage a Catholic, described John as a "bright, cheerful, gentle soul; a sensitive heart".

=== Music and literature ===
John's liturgical legacy has inspired several musical compositions, including Sergei Rachmaninoff's Liturgy of St. John Chrysostom, Op. 31, composed in 1910, one of his two major unaccompanied choral works; Pyotr Tchaikovsky's Liturgy of St. John Chrysostom, Op. 41; and Ukrainian composer Kyrylo Stetsenko's Liturgy of St. John Chrysostom, Arvo Pärt's Litany sets Chrysostom's twenty-four prayers, one for each hour of the day, for soli, mixed choir and orchestra. It also inspired the compositions of Alexander Grechaninovs Liturgy of Johannes Chrysostomos No. 1, Op. 13 (1897), Liturgy of Johannes Chrysostomos, No. 2, Op. 29 (1902), Liturgia Domestica (Liturgy Johannes Chrysostomos No. 3), Op. 79 (1917) and Liturgy of Johannes Chrysostomos No. 4, Op. 177 (1943) are noteworthy.

James Joyce's novel Ulysses includes a character named Mulligan who brings "Chrysostomos" into another character (Stephen Dedalus)'s mind because Mulligan's gold-stopped teeth and his gift of the gab earn him the title which St. John Chrysostom's preaching earned him, "golden-mouthed": "[Mulligan] peered sideways up and gave a long low whistle of call, then paused awhile in rapt attention, his even white teeth glistening here and there with gold points. Chrysostomos".

=== Legend of the penance of Saint John Chrysostom ===
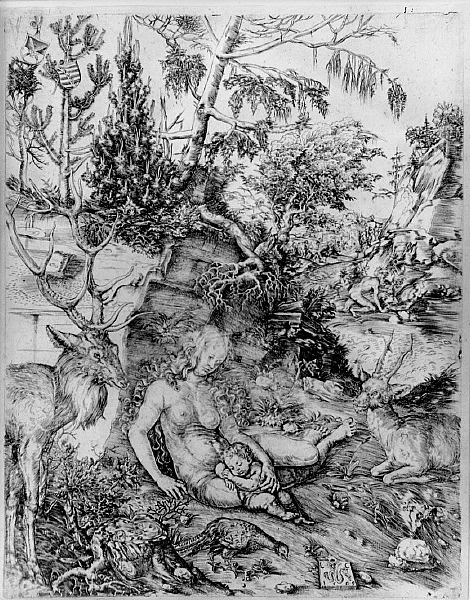
The Penance of St. John Chrysostom, engraving by Lucas Cranach the Elder, 1509. The saint can be seen in the background on all fours, while the princess and their baby dominate the foreground.

A late medieval legend relates that, when John Chrysostom was a hermit in the desert, he was approached by a royal princess in distress. (Note: A variant relates that this was Genevieve of Brabant, wife of Count Siegfried of Treves, who was unjustly accused of infidelity and sentenced to death. She was led into the forest to be put to death, but her executioners relented and there abandoned her.) John, thinking she was a demon, at first refused to help her, but the princess convinced him that she was a Christian and would be devoured by wild beasts if she were not allowed to enter his cave. He therefore admitted her, carefully dividing the cave in two parts, one for each of them. In spite of these precautions, the sin of fornication was committed, and in an attempt to hide it the distraught John took the princess and threw her over a precipice. He then went to Rome to beg absolution, which was refused. Realising the appalling nature of his crimes, Chrysostom made a vow that he would never rise from the ground until his sins were expiated, and for years he lived like a beast, crawling on all fours and feeding on wild grasses and roots. Subsequently, the princess reappeared, alive, and suckling John's baby, who miraculously pronounced his sins forgiven. This last scene was very popular from the late 15th century onwards as a subject for engravers and artists. The theme was depicted by Albrecht Dürer around 1496, Lucas Cranach the Elder, and Hans Sebald Beham among others. Martin Luther mocked this same legend in his Die Lügend von S. Johanne Chrysostomo (1537) to analyse the pitfalls of the Christian Legendary (hagiography).

=== Relics ===
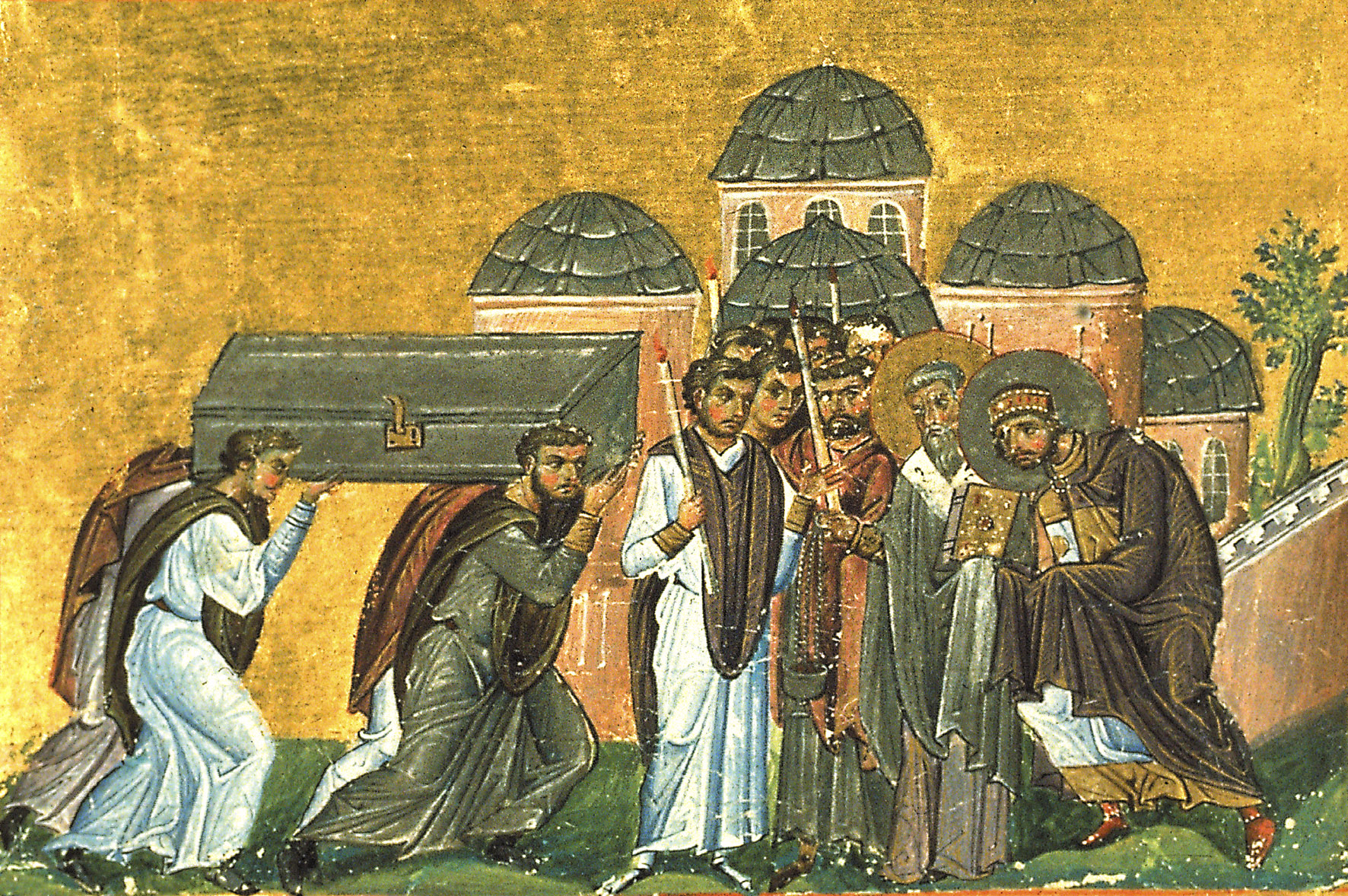
The return of the relics of Saint John Chrysostom to the Church of the Holy Apostles in Constantinople

John Chrysostom died in the city of Comana in 407 on his way to his place of exile. There his relics remained until 438 when, thirty years after his death, they were transferred to Constantinople during the reign of the empress Aelia Eudoxia's son, the emperor Theodosius II (408–450), under the guidance of John's disciple, Proclus of Constantinople, who by that time had become archbishop of Constantinople (434–447).

Most of John's relics were looted from Constantinople by crusaders in 1204 and taken to Rome, but some of his bones were returned to the Orthodox Church on 27 November 2004 by Pope John Paul II. Since 2004 the relics have been enshrined in the Church of St. George, Istanbul.

The skull, however, having been kept at the monastery at Vatopedi on Mount Athos in northern Greece, was not among the relics that were taken by the crusaders in the 13th century. In 1655, at the request of Tsar Alexei Mikhailovich, the skull was taken to Russia, for which the monastery was compensated in the sum of 2,000 rubles. In 1693, having received a request from the Vatopedi Monastery for the return of Saint John's skull, Tsar Peter the Great ordered that the skull remain in Russia but that the monastery was to be paid 500 rubles every four years. The Russian state archives document these payments up until 1735. The skull was kept at the Moscow Kremlin, in the Cathedral of the Dormition of the Mother of God, until 1920, when it was confiscated by the Soviets and placed in the Museum of Silver Antiquities. In 1988, in connection with the 1,000th anniversary of the Baptism of Russia, the head, along with other important relics, was returned to the Russian Orthodox Church and kept at the Epiphany Cathedral, until being moved to the Cathedral of Christ the Saviour after its restoration.

Today, the monastery at Vatopedi posits a rival claim to possessing the skull of John Chrysostom, and there a skull is venerated by pilgrims to the monastery as that of Saint John. Two sites in Italy also claim to have the saint's skull: the Basilica di Santa Maria del Fiore in Florence and the Dal Pozzo chapel in Pisa. The right hand of Saint John is preserved at Philotheou Monastery on Mount Athos, and numerous smaller relics are scattered throughout the world.

== Collected works ==
Widely used editions of Chrysostom's works are available in Greek, Latin, English, and French. The Greek edition is edited by Sir Henry Savile (eight volumes, Eton, 1613); the most complete Greek and Latin edition is edited by Bernard de Montfaucon (thirteen volumes, Paris, 1718–1738, republished in 1834–1840, and reprinted in Migne's Patrologia Graeca, volumes 47–64). There is an English translation in the first series of the Nicene and Post-Nicene Fathers (London and New York, 1889–1890). A selection of his writings has been published more recently in the original with facing French translation in Sources Chrétiennes.

== See also ==
- Nicarete

== Bibliography ==
- Allen, Pauline and Mayer, Wendy (2000), John Chrysostom, Routledge, ISBN 0-415-18252-2.
- Attwater, Donald (1960), St. John Chrysostom: Pastor and Preacher, London, Catholic Book Club.
- Baur, Chrysostom (1910). "St. John Chrysostom" . In Herbermann, Charles (ed.). Catholic Encyclopedia. Vol. 8. New York: Robert Appleton Company.
- Blamires, Harry (1996), The New Bloomsday Book: A Guide Through Ulysses, London, Routledge ISBN 0-415-13858-2.
- Brändle, R., V. Jegher-Bucher, and Johannes Chrysostomus (1995), Acht Reden gegen Juden (Bibliothek der griechischen Literatur 41), Stuttgart, Hiersemann.
- Brustein, William I. (2003), Roots of Hate: Anti-Semitism in Europe before the Holocaust, Cambridge University Press ISBN 0-521-77308-3.
- Butler, Alban (1821). The lives of the fathers, martyrs, and other principal saints. Archived from the original on 27 January 2024..
- Carter, Robert (1962), "The Chronology of St. John Chrysostom's Early Life", Traditio 18, 357–364.
- Chrysostom, John (1979), Discourses Against Judaizing Christians, trans. Paul W. Harkins, The Fathers of the Church; V. 68. Washington, The Catholic University of America Press.
- Chuvin, Pierre (1990), "A chronicle of the last pagans", Harvard University Press.
- Dumortier, Jean (1951), "La valeur historique du dialogue de Palladius et la chronologie de saint Jean Chrysostome", Mélanges de science religieuse, 8, 51–56.
- Hartney, Aideen (2004), John Chrysostom and the Transformation of the City, London, Duckworth Books ISBN 0-520-04757-5.
- Joyce, James (1961), Ulysses, New York, Modern Library.
- Kelly, John Norman Davidson (1995), Golden Mouth - The Story of John Chrysostom-Ascetic, Preacher, Bishop, Ithaca, New York, Cornell University Press ISBN 0-8014-3189-1.
- Laqueur, Walter (2006), The Changing Face of Antisemitism - From Ancient Times To The Present Day, Oxford University Press ISBN 0-19-530429-2.
- Liebeschuetz, J.H.W.G. (1990), Barbarians and Bishops - Army, Church and State in the Age of Arcadius and Chrysostom, Oxford, Clarendon Press ISBN 0-19-814886-0.
- Lechințan, Lucian (29 November 2023). "Paths of Devotion, Art, and Liturgy throughout the Palaiologan Era. The Enthroned Virgin with the Child, Holy Patrons, and Archangels, in the Semi-dome of the Main Apse of the Wallachian Church Dedicated to Saint Nicholas in Curtea de Argeş". Anastasis. Research in Medieval Culture and Art. 10 (2): 47–76. doi:10.35218/armca.2023.2.03. ISSN 2392-862X.
- Lewy, Yohanan [Hans] (1997), "John Chrysostom", Encyclopaedia Judaica, (CD-ROM Edition Version 1.0), Ed. Cecil Roth, Keter Publishing House ISBN 965-07-0665-8.
- Meeks, Wayne A. and Robert L. Wilken (1978), Jews and Christians in Antioch in the First Four Centuries of the Common Era (The Society of Biblical Literature, Number 13), Missoula, Scholars Press ISBN 0-89130-229-8.
- Stephen Morris (theologian), "Let Us Love One Another" - Liturgy, Morality, and Political Theory in Chrysostom's Sermons on Rom, 12–13 and II Thess. 2", in: Speculum Sermonis - Interdisciplinary Reflections on the Medieval Sermon, ed. Georgiana Donavin, Cary J. Nederman, and Richard Utz, Turnhout, Brepols, 2004. pp. 89–112.
- Palladius, Bishop of Aspuna, Palladius on the Life And Times of St. John Chrysostom, transl. and edited by Robert T. Meyer, New York, Newman Press, 1985 ISBN 0-8091-0358-3.
- Parkes, James (1969). Prelude to Dialogue. London: Schocken Books.
- Parry, David; David Melling, eds. (2001). The Blackwell Dictionary of Eastern Christianity. Oxford: Blackwell. ISBN 0-631-18966-1.
- Pradels, W. (2002), "Lesbos Cod. Gr. 27 - The Tale of a Discovery", Zeitschrift für Antikes Christentum, 6, pp. 81–89.
- Pradels, W., R. Brändle, and M. Heimgartner (2001), "Das bisher vermisste Textstück in Johannes Chrysostomus, Adversus Judaeos, Oratio 2", Zeitschrift für Antikes Christentum, 5, pp. 23–49.
- Pradels, W., R. Brändle, and M. Heimgartner (2002), "The sequence and dating of the series of John Chrysostom's eight discourses Adversus Judaeos", Zeitschrift für Antikes Christentum, 6, pp. 90–116.
- Schaff, Philip, and Henry Wace (eds.) (1890), Socrates, Sozomenus: Church Histories, (A Select Library of Nicene and post-Nicene Fathers of the Christian Church, second series, Vol. II), New York, The Christian Literature Company.
- Stark, Rodney (1997), The Rise of Christianity. How the Obscure, Marginal Jesus Movement Became the Dominant Religious Force in the Western World in a Few Centuries, Princeton University Press.
- Stephens, W. R. W. (1883), Saint John Chrysostom, His Life and Times, London, John Murray (publishing house).
- Stow, Kenneth (2006), Jewish Dogs, An Imagine and Its Interpreters - Continiuity in the Catholic-Jewish Encounter, Stanford, Stanford University Press ISBN 0-8047-5281-8.
- Wilken, R. L. (2004). John Chrysostom and the Jews - Rhetoric and Reality in the Late 4th Century. Wipf and Stock. ISBN 978-1-59244-942-2. Archived from the original on 27 January 2024.
- Wilken, Robert (2013). Ferguson, Everett (ed.). Encyclopedia of Early Christianity - Second Edition. Garland reference library of the humanities. Taylor & Francis. ISBN 978-1-136-61158-2. Archived from the original on 27 January 2024.
- Willey, John H. (1906), Chrysostom - The Orator, Cincinnati, Jennings and Graham.
- Thomas Woods (2005), How the Catholic Church Built Western Civilization, Washington, D.C., Regenery ISBN 0-89526-038-7.

Titles of the Great Christian Church
Preceded by Nectarius	Archbishop of Constantinople; 398 – 404	Succeeded by Arsacius of Tarsus
