= Institute for Trade and Investment =

Former representative office of Ireland for Taiwan

Agency overview
- Formed: 1989
- Dissolved: 2012
- Headquarters: Taiwan

The Institute for Trade and Investment was the representative office of Ireland to Taiwan.

== History ==
The office was opened in 1989. In 2012, the office was closed due to austerity measures.

== See also ==
- List of diplomatic missions of Ireland
