= List of diplomatic missions of Ireland =

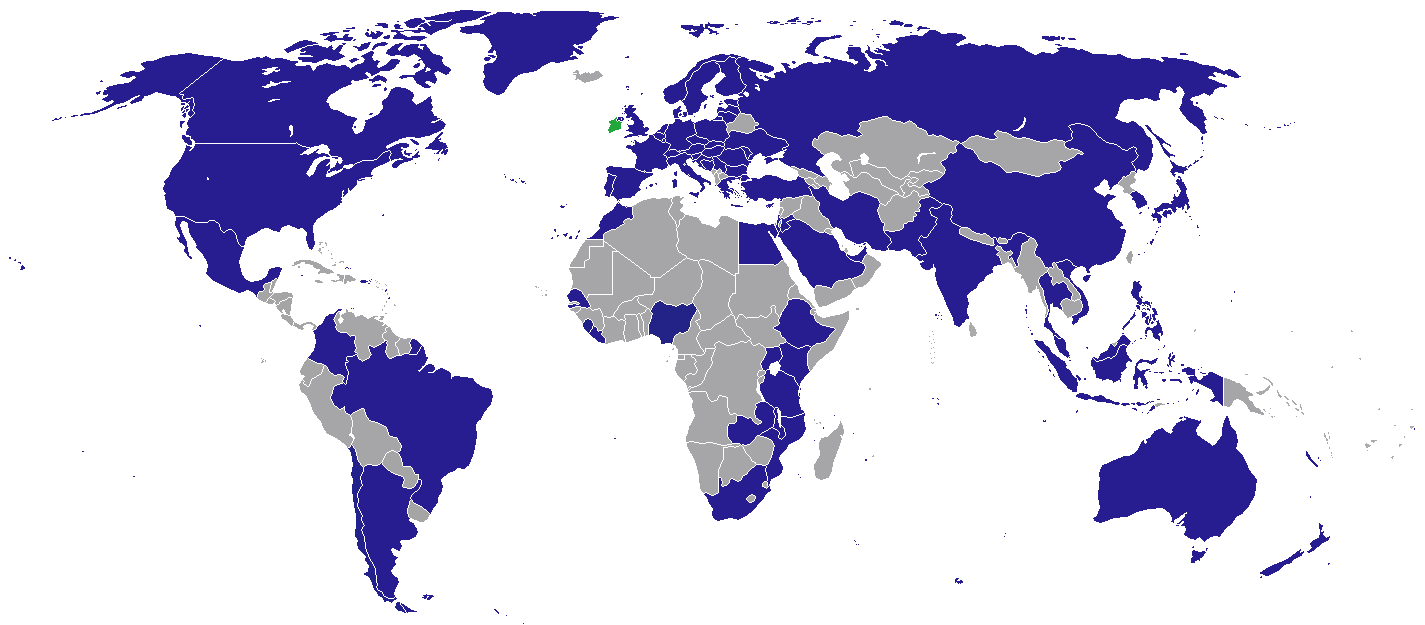
Countries with Irish diplomatic missions

Ireland has diplomatic relations with 161 other governments. Ireland has numerous embassies and consulates abroad.

Honorary consulates and the overseas offices of Irish state agencies, namely Bord Bia, Enterprise Ireland, IDA Ireland, and Tourism Ireland, are omitted from this listing.

== Current missions ==
=== Africa ===
Host country	Host city	Mission	Year Opened	Concurrent accreditation	Ref.
Egypt	Cairo	Embassy	1975	Countries: Lebanon; Syria	
Ethiopia	Addis Ababa	Embassy	1994	Countries: Djibouti; South Sudan; International Organizations: African Union; Intergovernmental Authority on Development; UNECA	
Kenya	Nairobi	Embassy	1979 (Note: Closed in 1989. Reopened in 2015.)	Countries: Eritrea; Somalia; Sudan; International Organizations: United Nations; United Nations Environment Programme; United Nations Human Settlements Programme	
Liberia	Monrovia	Embassy	2018		
Malawi	Lilongwe	Embassy	2007		
Morocco	Rabat	Embassy	2021	Countries: Mauritania; Tunisia	
Mozambique	Maputo	Embassy	1996	Countries: Eswatini; Madagascar	
Nigeria	Abuja	Embassy	1961 (Note: was moved from Lagos to Abuja in 1992)	Countries: Benin; Burkina Faso; Cameroon; Chad; Gabon; Ghana; Ivory Coast; Niger; São Tomé and Principe; Togo; International Organizations: Economic Community of West African States (Note: Accredited as an observer mission)	
Senegal	Dakar	Embassy	2023	Countries: Gambia; Mali	
Sierra Leone	Freetown	Embassy	2014	Countries: Guinea	
South Africa	Pretoria	Embassy	1994	Countries: Botswana; Lesotho; Mauritius; Zimbabwe; International Organizations: Southern African Development Community	
Tanzania	Dar es Salaam	Embassy	1979	Countries: Burundi; Comoros; Congo-Kinshasa; Seychelles	
Uganda	Kampala	Embassy	1994	Countries: Rwanda	
Zambia	Lusaka	Embassy	1980	Countries: Namibia; International Organizations: Common Market for Eastern and Southern Africa	

=== Americas ===
Host country	Host city	Mission	Year Opened	Concurrent accreditation	Ref.
Argentina	Buenos Aires	Embassy	1947	Countries: Bolivia; Paraguay; Uruguay	
Brazil	Brasília	Embassy	2001	Countries: Guyana; Suriname	
Brazil	São Paulo	Consulate-General	2014	Countries: Guyana; Suriname	
Canada	Ottawa	Embassy	1950	Countries: Bahamas; Jamaica	
Canada	Toronto	Consulate-General	2022	Countries: Bahamas; Jamaica	
Canada	Vancouver	Consulate-General	2018	Countries: Bahamas; Jamaica	
Chile	Santiago	Embassy	2019	Countries: Ecuador; Peru	
Colombia	Bogotá	Embassy	2018	Countries: Dominican Republic; Panama; Venezuela	
Mexico	Mexico City	Embassy	1998	Countries: Belize; Costa Rica; Cuba; El Salvador; Guatemala; Honduras; Nicaragua	
United States	Washington, D.C.	Embassy	1924	Countries: Antigua and Barbuda; Barbados; Dominica; Grenada; Saint Lucia; Saint Kitts and Nevis; Saint Vincent and the Grenadines; Trinidad and Tobago; International Organizations: Organization of American States	
United States	Atlanta	Consulate-General	2011	Countries: Antigua and Barbuda; Barbados; Dominica; Grenada; Saint Lucia; Saint Kitts and Nevis; Saint Vincent and the Grenadines; Trinidad and Tobago; International Organizations: Organization of American States	
United States	Austin	Consulate-General	2014	Countries: Antigua and Barbuda; Barbados; Dominica; Grenada; Saint Lucia; Saint Kitts and Nevis; Saint Vincent and the Grenadines; Trinidad and Tobago; International Organizations: Organization of American States	
United States	Boston	Consulate-General	1929	Countries: Antigua and Barbuda; Barbados; Dominica; Grenada; Saint Lucia; Saint Kitts and Nevis; Saint Vincent and the Grenadines; Trinidad and Tobago; International Organizations: Organization of American States	
United States	Chicago	Consulate-General	1933	Countries: Antigua and Barbuda; Barbados; Dominica; Grenada; Saint Lucia; Saint Kitts and Nevis; Saint Vincent and the Grenadines; Trinidad and Tobago; International Organizations: Organization of American States	
United States	Los Angeles	Consulate-General	2019	Countries: Antigua and Barbuda; Barbados; Dominica; Grenada; Saint Lucia; Saint Kitts and Nevis; Saint Vincent and the Grenadines; Trinidad and Tobago; International Organizations: Organization of American States	
United States	Miami	Consulate-General	2022	Countries: Antigua and Barbuda; Barbados; Dominica; Grenada; Saint Lucia; Saint Kitts and Nevis; Saint Vincent and the Grenadines; Trinidad and Tobago; International Organizations: Organization of American States	
United States	New York City	Consulate-General	1930	Countries: Antigua and Barbuda; Barbados; Dominica; Grenada; Saint Lucia; Saint Kitts and Nevis; Saint Vincent and the Grenadines; Trinidad and Tobago; International Organizations: Organization of American States	
United States	San Francisco	Consulate-General	1933	Countries: Antigua and Barbuda; Barbados; Dominica; Grenada; Saint Lucia; Saint Kitts and Nevis; Saint Vincent and the Grenadines; Trinidad and Tobago; International Organizations: Organization of American States	

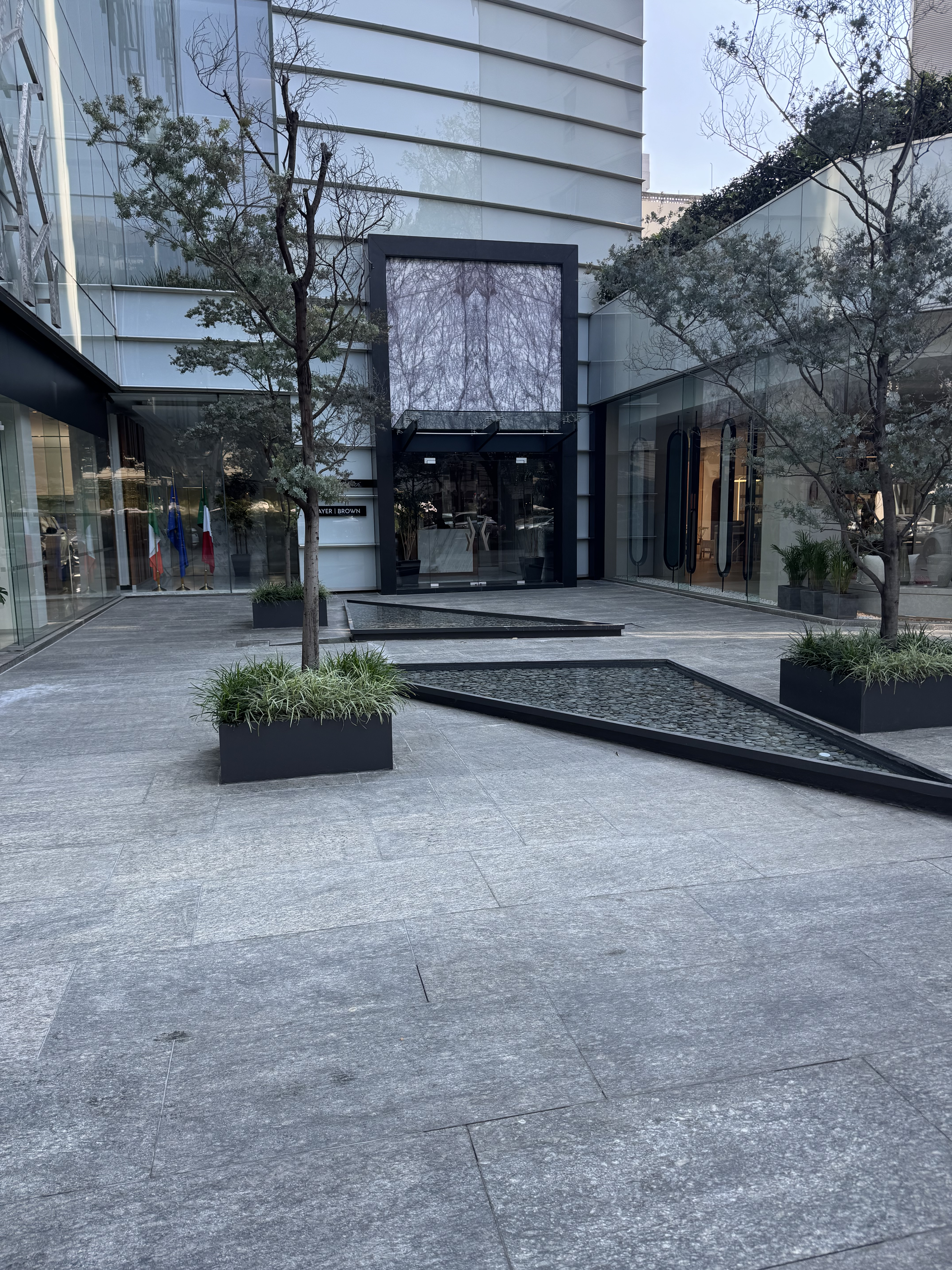
Building hosting the Embassy in Mexico City

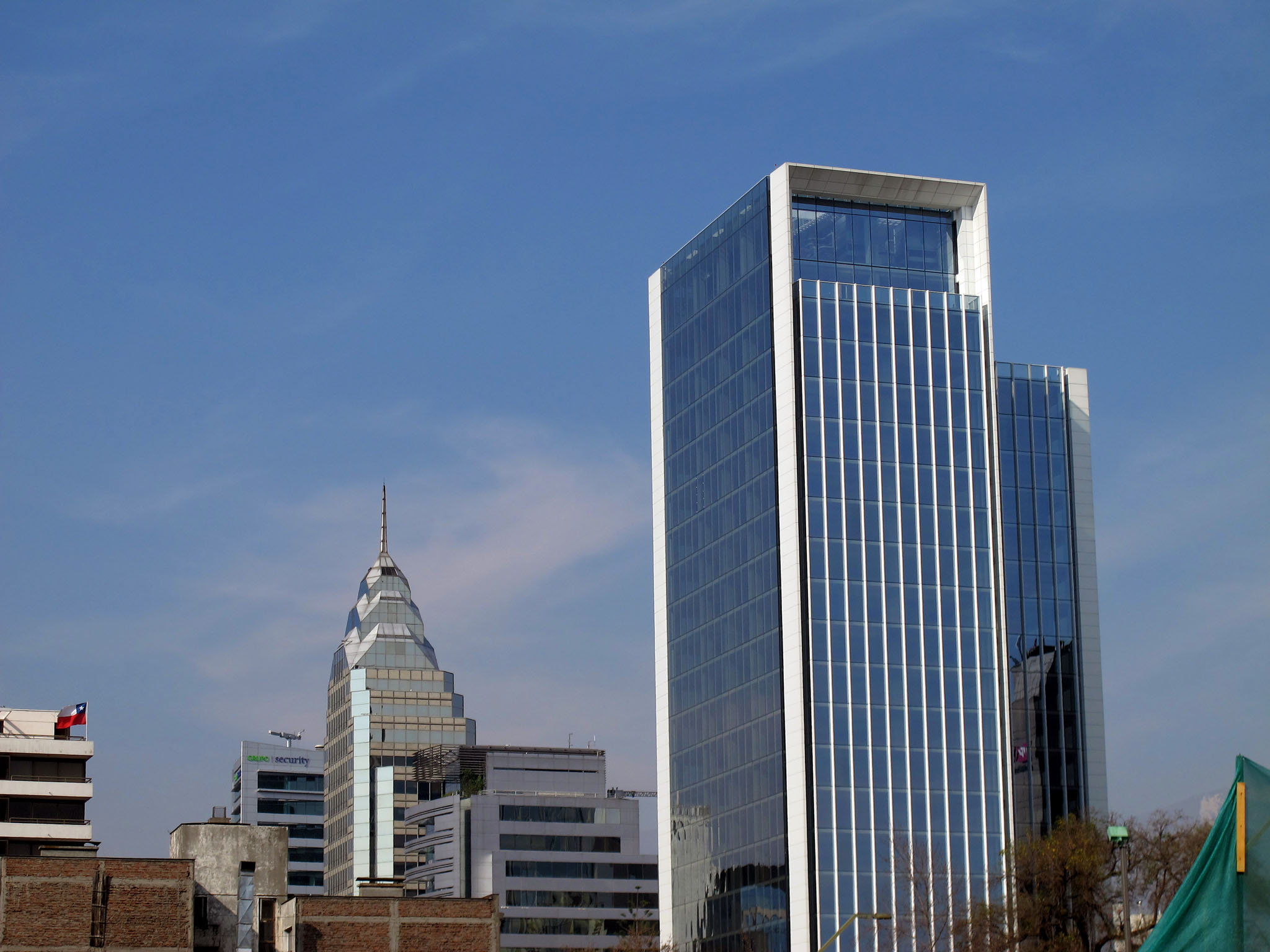
Building hosting the Embassy in Santiago de Chile

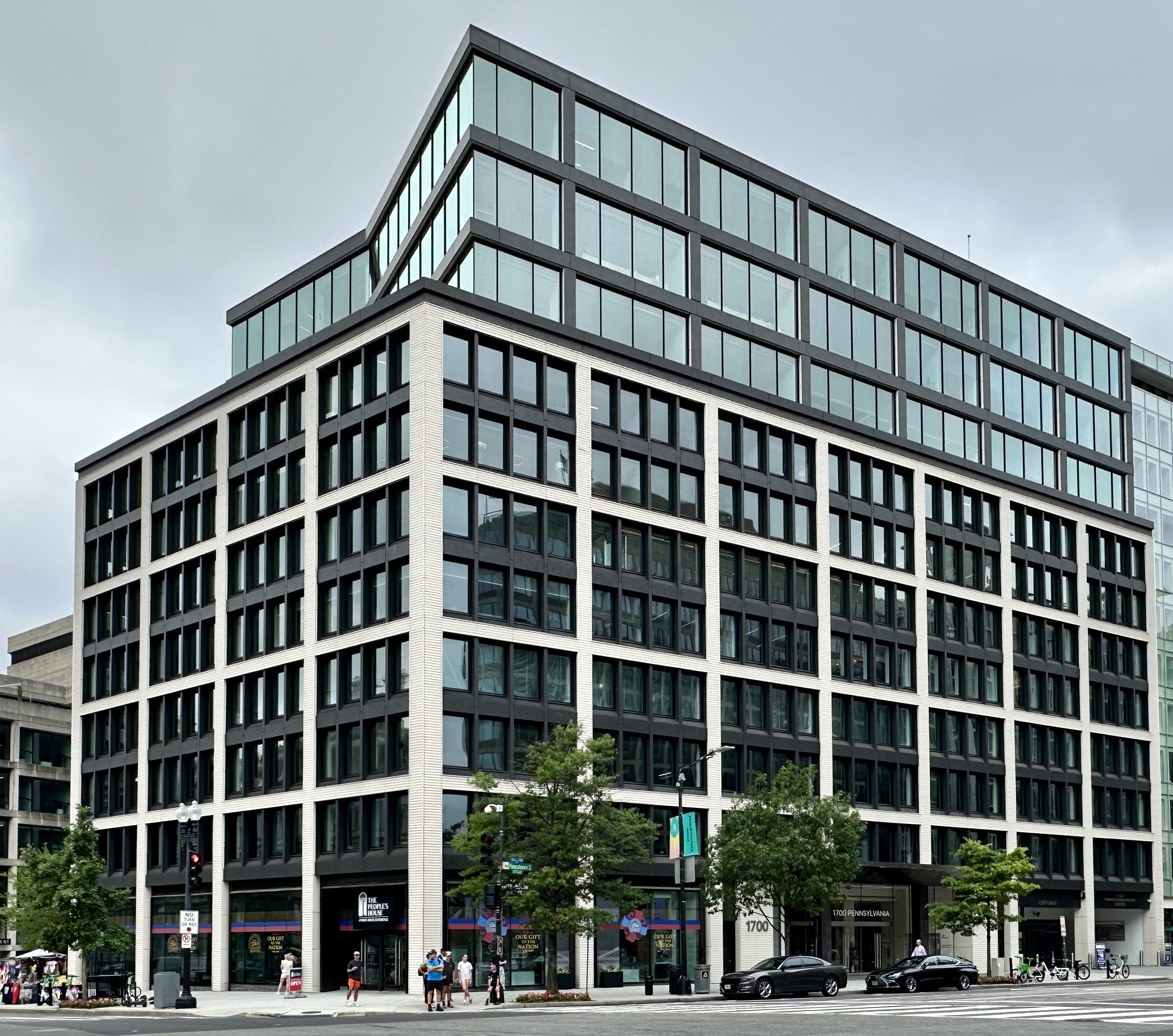
Building hosting the Embassy in Washington, D.C.

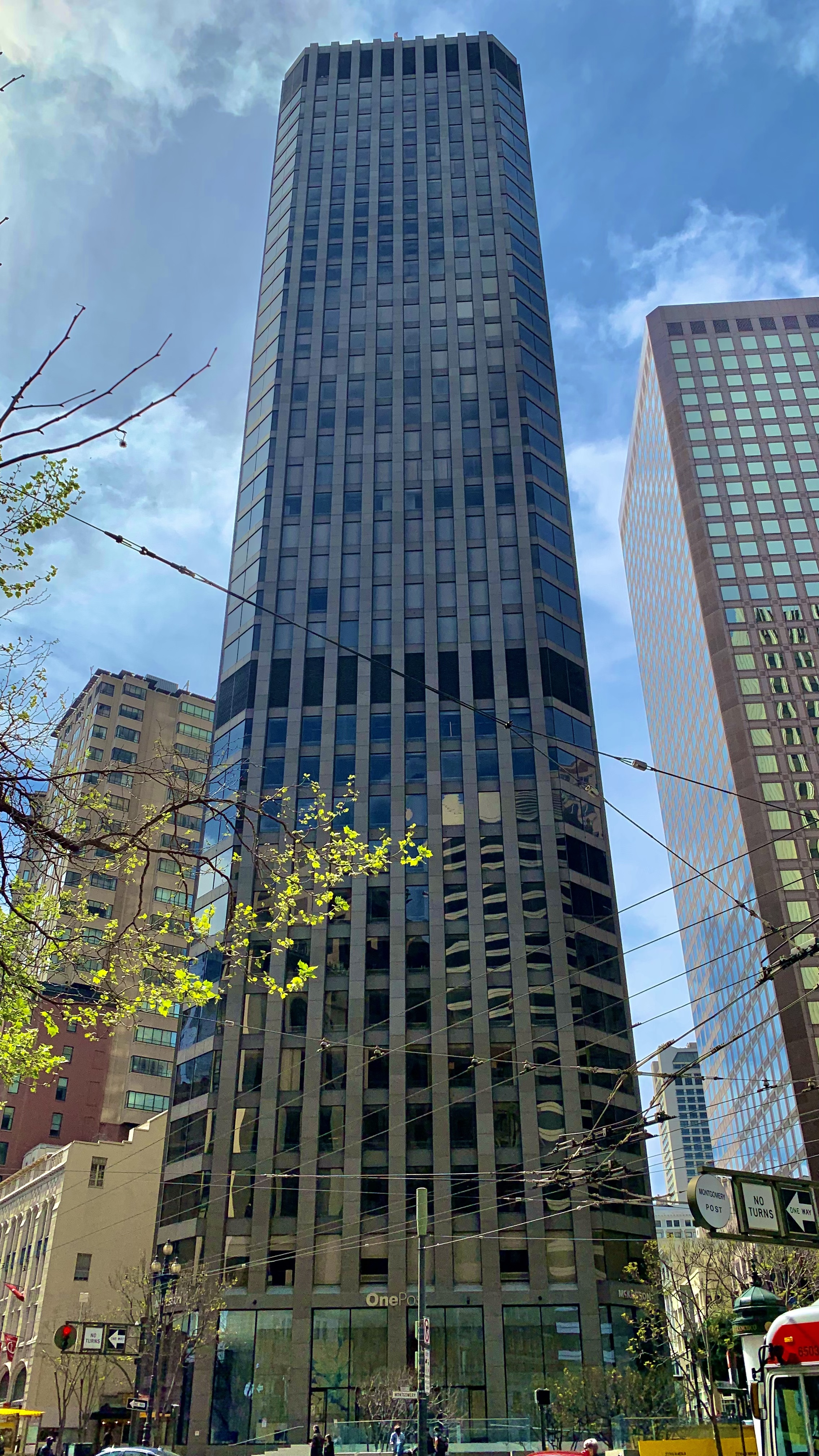
Building hosting the Consulate-General in San Francisco

=== Asia ===
Host country	Host city	Mission	Year Opened	Concurrent accreditation	Ref.
China	Beijing	Embassy	1979	Countries: Mongolia	
China	Hong Kong	Consulate-General	2014	Countries: Mongolia	
China	Shanghai	Consulate-General	2000	Countries: Mongolia	
India	New Delhi	Embassy	1964	Countries: Bangladesh; Maldives; Nepal; Sri Lanka	
India	Mumbai	Consulate-General	2019	Countries: Bangladesh; Maldives; Nepal; Sri Lanka	
Indonesia	Jakarta	Embassy	2014	Countries: Timor Leste; International Organizations: Association of Southeast Asian Nations	
Iran	Tehran	Embassy			
Israel	Tel Aviv	Embassy	1996		
Japan	Tokyo	Embassy	1973		
Jordan	Amman	Embassy	2019	Countries: Iraq	
Malaysia	Kuala Lumpur	Embassy	1995		
Pakistan	Islamabad	Embassy	2024	Countries: Afghanistan	
Palestine	Ramallah	Representative office	2000		
Philippines	Manila	Embassy	2021	Countries: Marshall Islands; Micronesia; Palau	
Saudi Arabia	Riyadh	Embassy	1976	Countries: Bahrain; Oman; Yemen	
Singapore	Singapore	Embassy	2000	Countries: Brunei	
South Korea	Seoul	Embassy	1989	Countries: North Korea	
Thailand	Bangkok	Embassy	2014	Countries: Myanmar	
Turkey	Ankara	Embassy	1998	Countries: Azerbaijan; Georgia; Turkmenistan	
United Arab Emirates	Abu Dhabi	Embassy	2009	Countries: Kuwait; Qatar	
Vietnam	Hanoi	Embassy	2005	Countries: Cambodia; Laos	

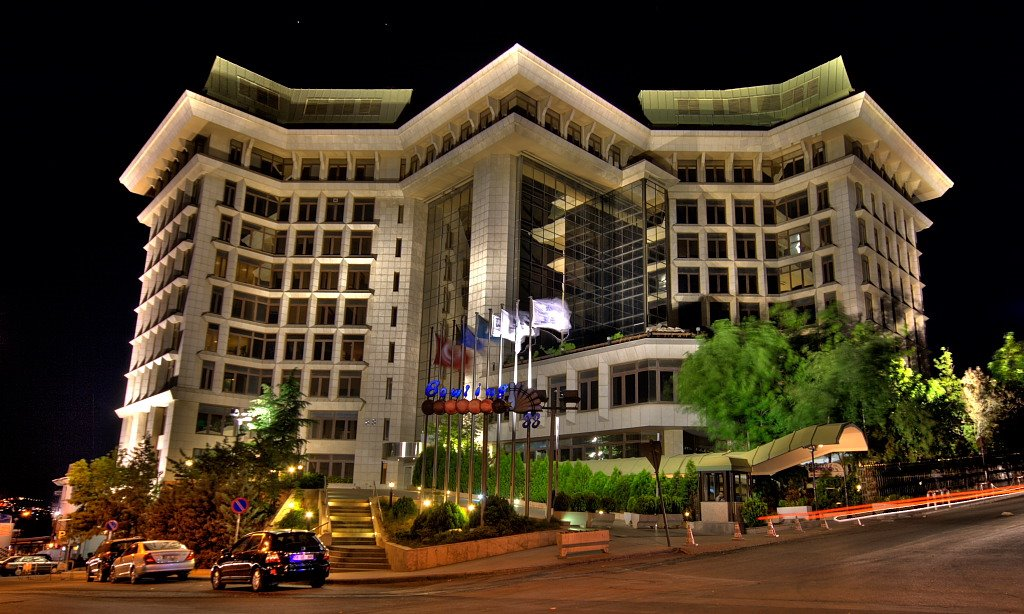
Building hosting the Embassy in Ankara

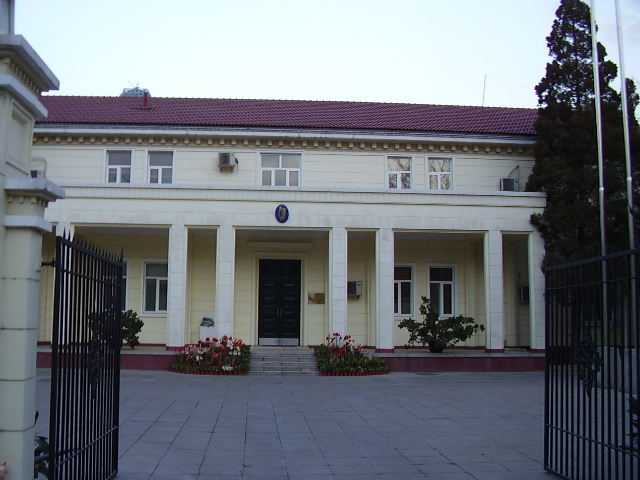
Embassy in Beijing

Building hosting the Embassy in Jakarta

Building hosting the Embassy in Manila

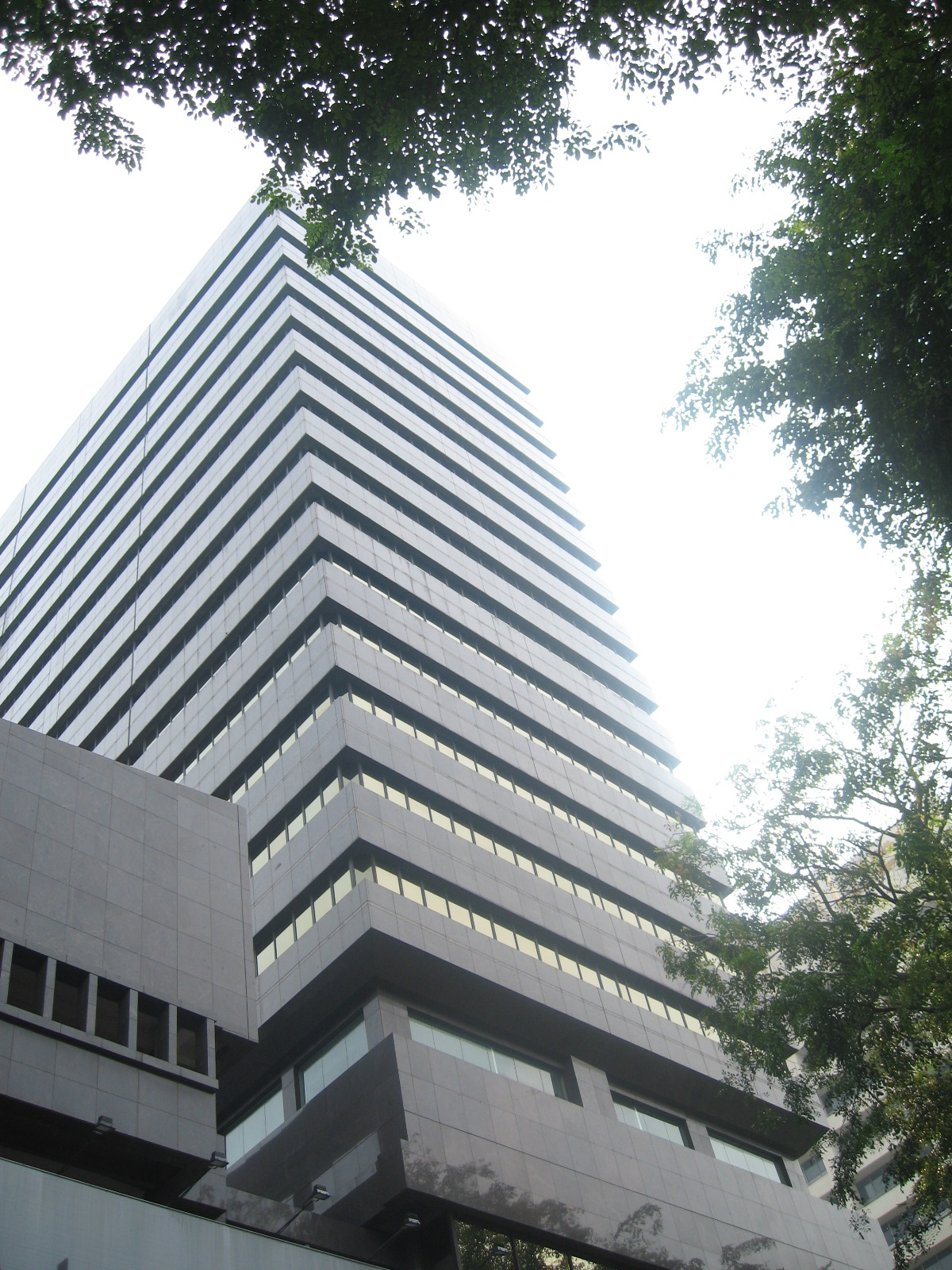
Building hosting the Embassy in Singapore

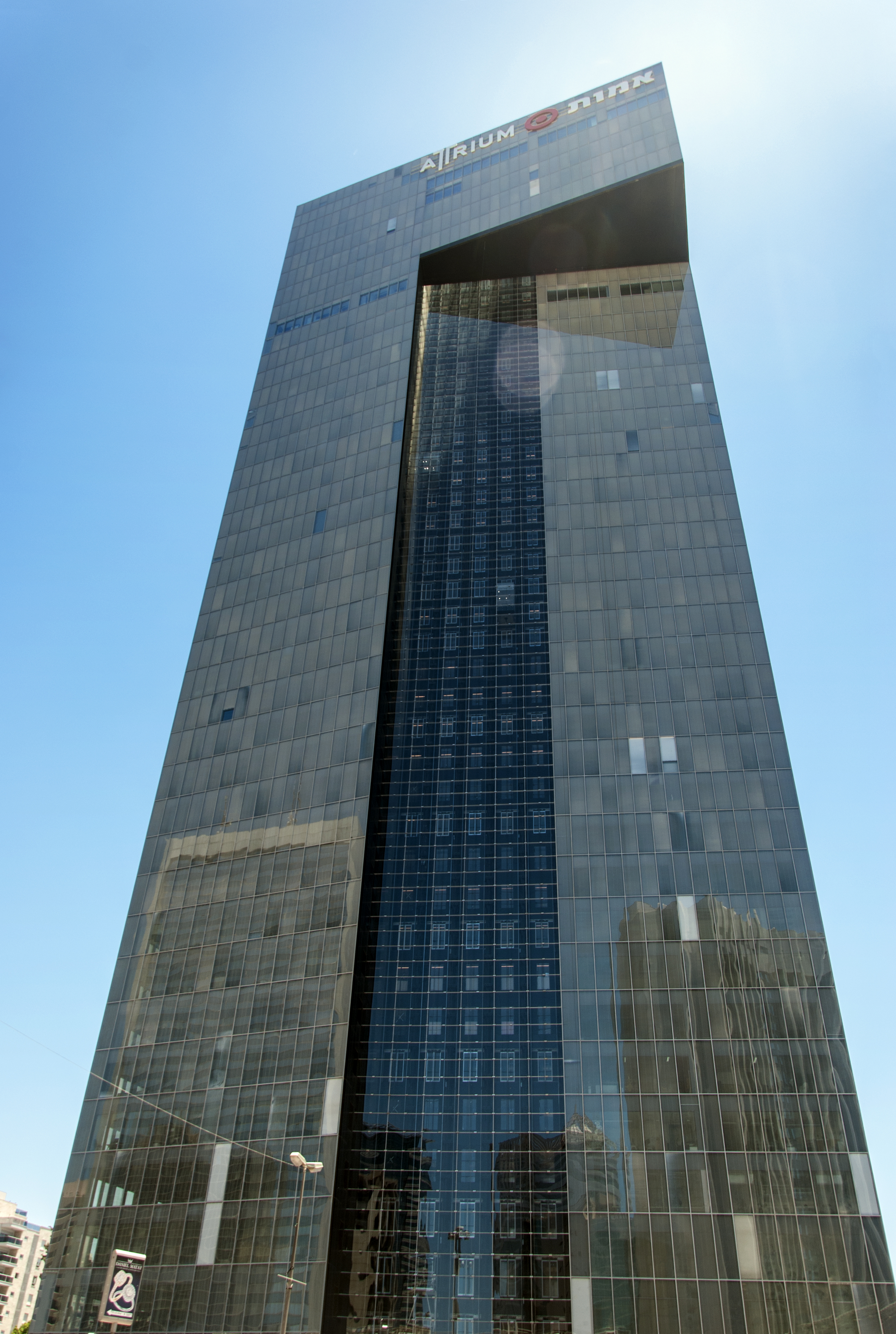
Building hosting the Embassy in Tel Aviv

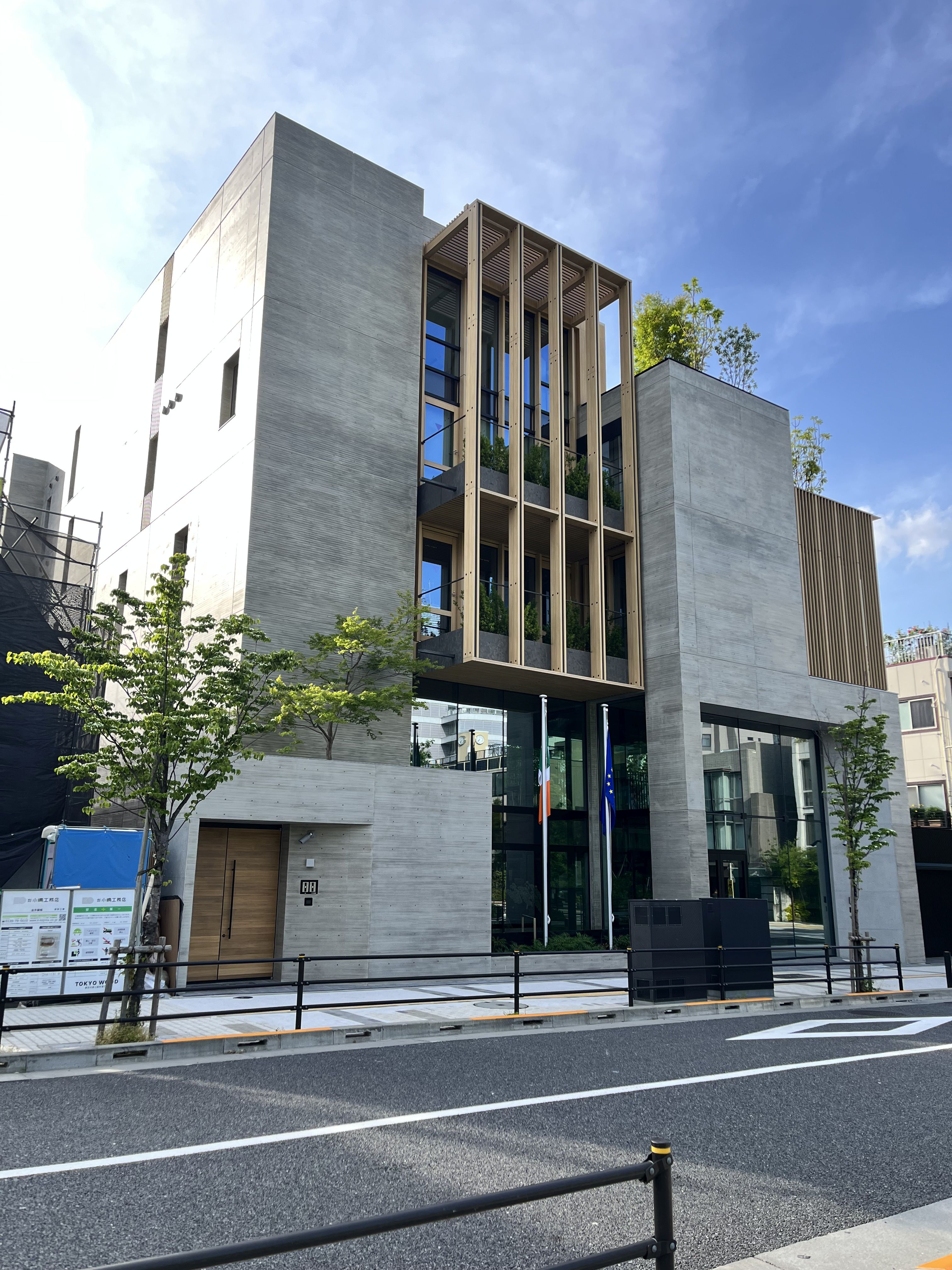
Embassy in Tokyo

=== Europe ===
Host country	Host city	Mission	Year Opened	Concurrent accreditation	Ref.
Austria	Vienna	Embassy	1974	International Organizations: United Nations; International Atomic Energy Agency; UNIDO; UNODC	
Belgium	Brussels	Embassy	1950		
Bosnia and Herzegovina	Sarajevo	Embassy	2025		
Bulgaria	Sofia	Embassy	2005	Countries: Armenia	
Croatia	Zagreb	Embassy	2014		
Cyprus	Nicosia	Embassy	2001		
Czech Republic	Prague	Embassy	1995		
Denmark	Copenhagen	Embassy	1962		
Estonia	Tallinn	Embassy	2001		
Finland	Helsinki	Embassy	1993		
France	Paris	Embassy	1929	Countries: Monaco	
France	Lyon	Consulate-General	2022	Countries: Monaco	
Germany	Berlin	Embassy	1929 (Note: Closed in 1945; reopened in 1951 in Bonn; removed to Berlin in 2000)		
Germany	Frankfurt	Consulate General	2019		
Germany	Munich	Consulate General	2024		
Greece	Athens	Embassy	1977	Countries: Albania	
Holy See (Note: The Irish Embassy to the Holy See is located outside Vatican territory, in Rome.)	Rome	Embassy	1929 (Note: Closed in 2011 reopened in 2014)		
Hungary	Budapest	Embassy	1995	Countries: Kosovo	
Italy	Rome	Embassy	1938	Countries: Libya; San Marino; International Organizations: Food and Agriculture Organization; International Fund for Agricultural Development; World Food Programme	
Italy	Milan	Consulate General	2024	Countries: Libya; San Marino; International Organizations: Food and Agriculture Organization; International Fund for Agricultural Development; World Food Programme	
Latvia	Riga	Embassy	2005		
Lithuania	Vilnius	Embassy	2005	Countries: Belarus	
Luxembourg	Luxembourg	Embassy	1973		
Malta	Valletta	Embassy	2005		
Moldova	Chișinău	Embassy	2025		
Netherlands	The Hague	Embassy	1950	International Organizations: International Criminal Court; Organisation for the Prohibition of Chemical Weapons	
Norway	Oslo	Embassy	2001	Countries: Iceland	
Poland	Warsaw	Embassy	1990		
Portugal	Lisbon	Embassy	1942	Countries: Angola; Cape Verde; Guinea-Bissau	
Romania	Bucharest	Embassy	2005	Countries: North Macedonia	
Russia	Moscow	Embassy	1974	Countries: Kazakhstan; Kyrgyzstan; Tajikistan; Uzbekistan	
Serbia	Belgrade	Embassy	2025	Countries: Montenegro	
Slovakia	Bratislava	Embassy	2001		
Slovenia	Ljubljana	Embassy	2001		
Spain	Madrid	Embassy	1935	Countries: Andorra	
Sweden	Stockholm	Embassy	1946		
Switzerland	Bern	Embassy	1940	Countries: Algeria; Liechtenstein	
Ukraine	Kyiv	Embassy	2020		
United Kingdom	London	Embassy	1923		
United Kingdom	Cardiff	Consulate-General	2019		
United Kingdom	Edinburgh	Consulate-General	1998		
United Kingdom	Manchester	Consulate-General	2021		

==== Northern Ireland ====
Non-consular Department of Foreign Affairs missions to represent the Republic of Ireland in the Good Friday Agreement institutions.

Location	Institution	Host city	Mission	Year Opened	Ref.
Northern Ireland	British–Irish Intergovernmental Conference	Belfast	Government Secretariat	1999	
Northern Ireland	North/South Ministerial Council	Armagh	Joint Secretariat	1999	

Building hosting the embassy in Athens

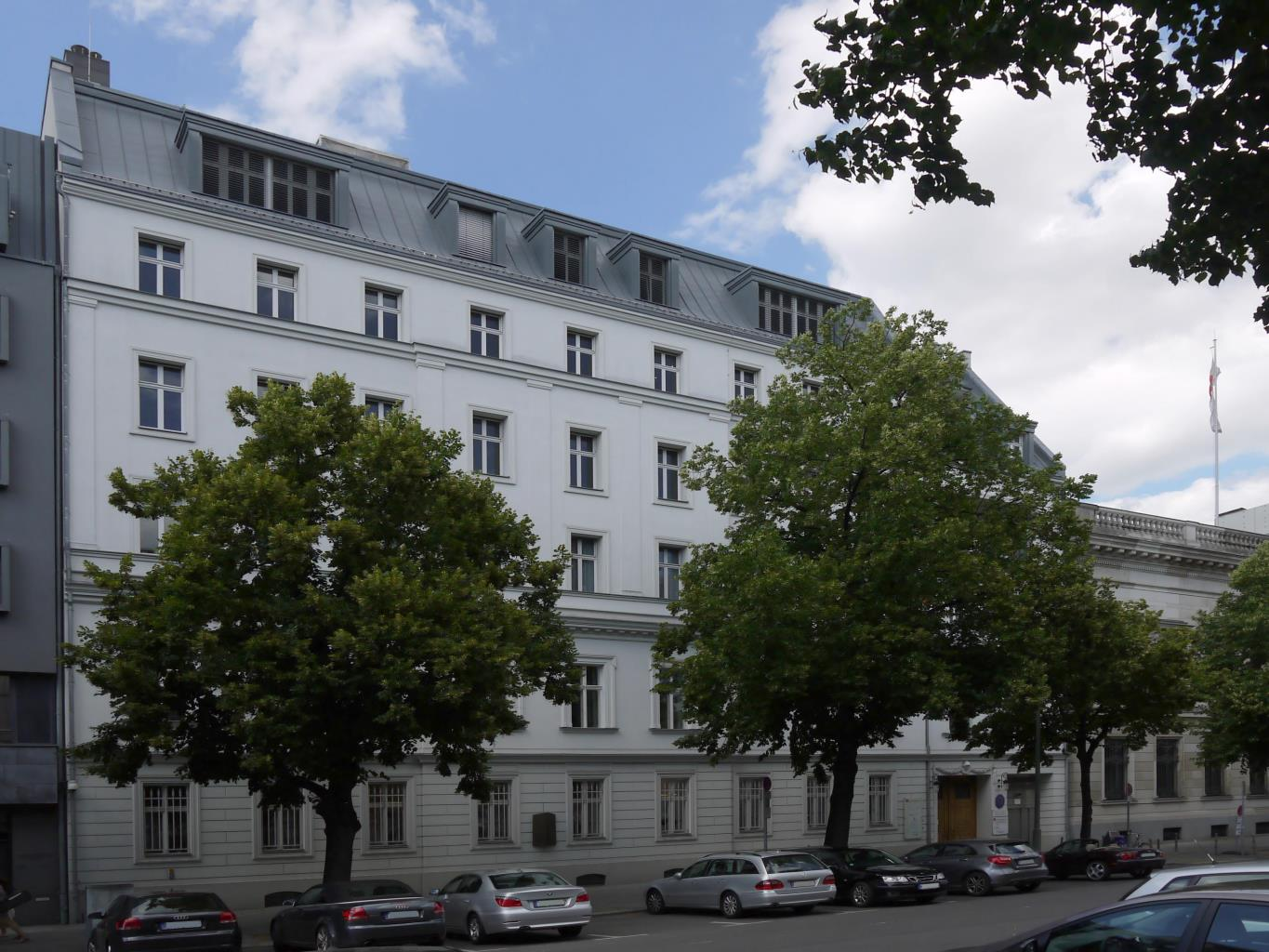
Embassy in Berlin

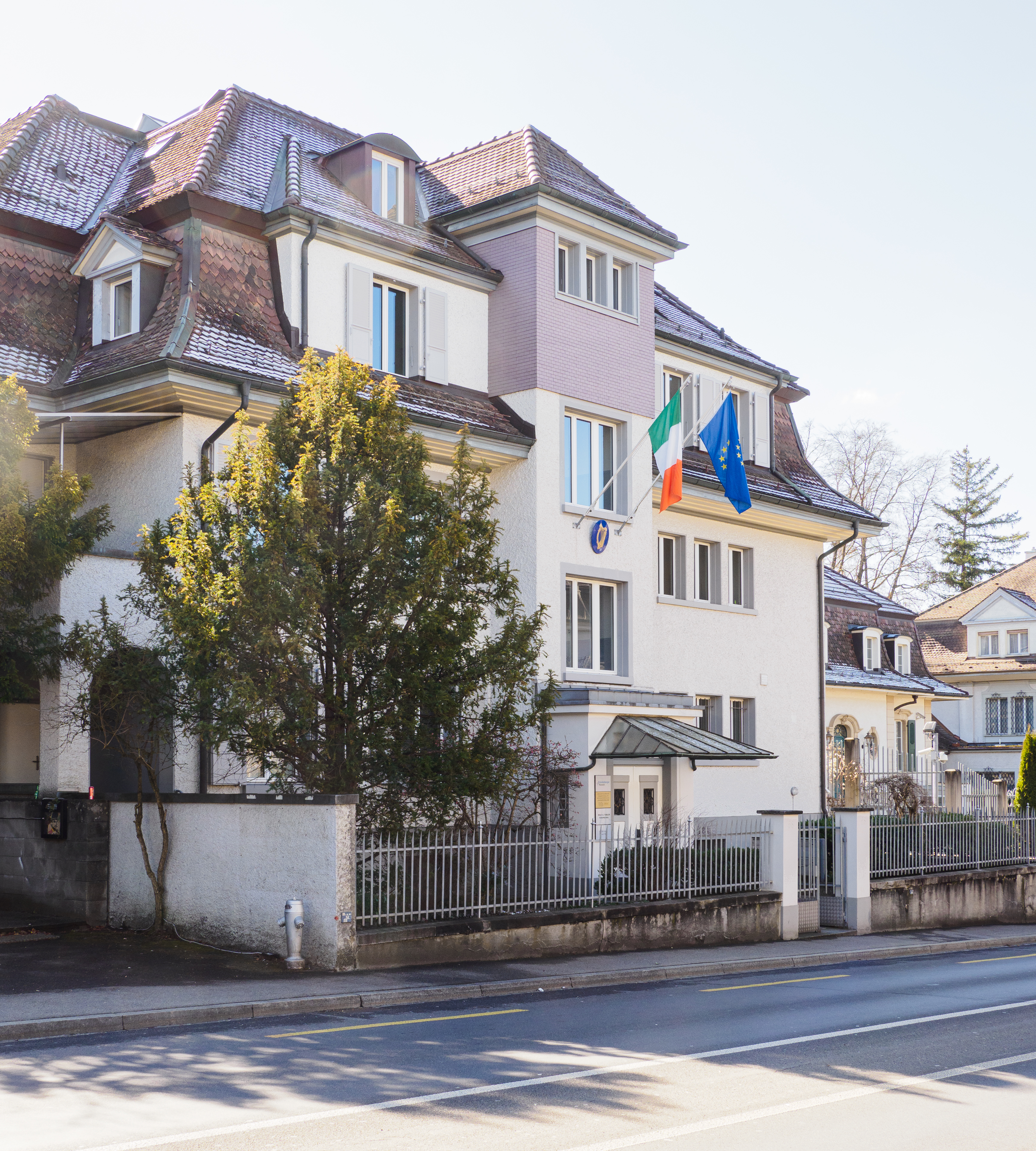
Embassy in Bern

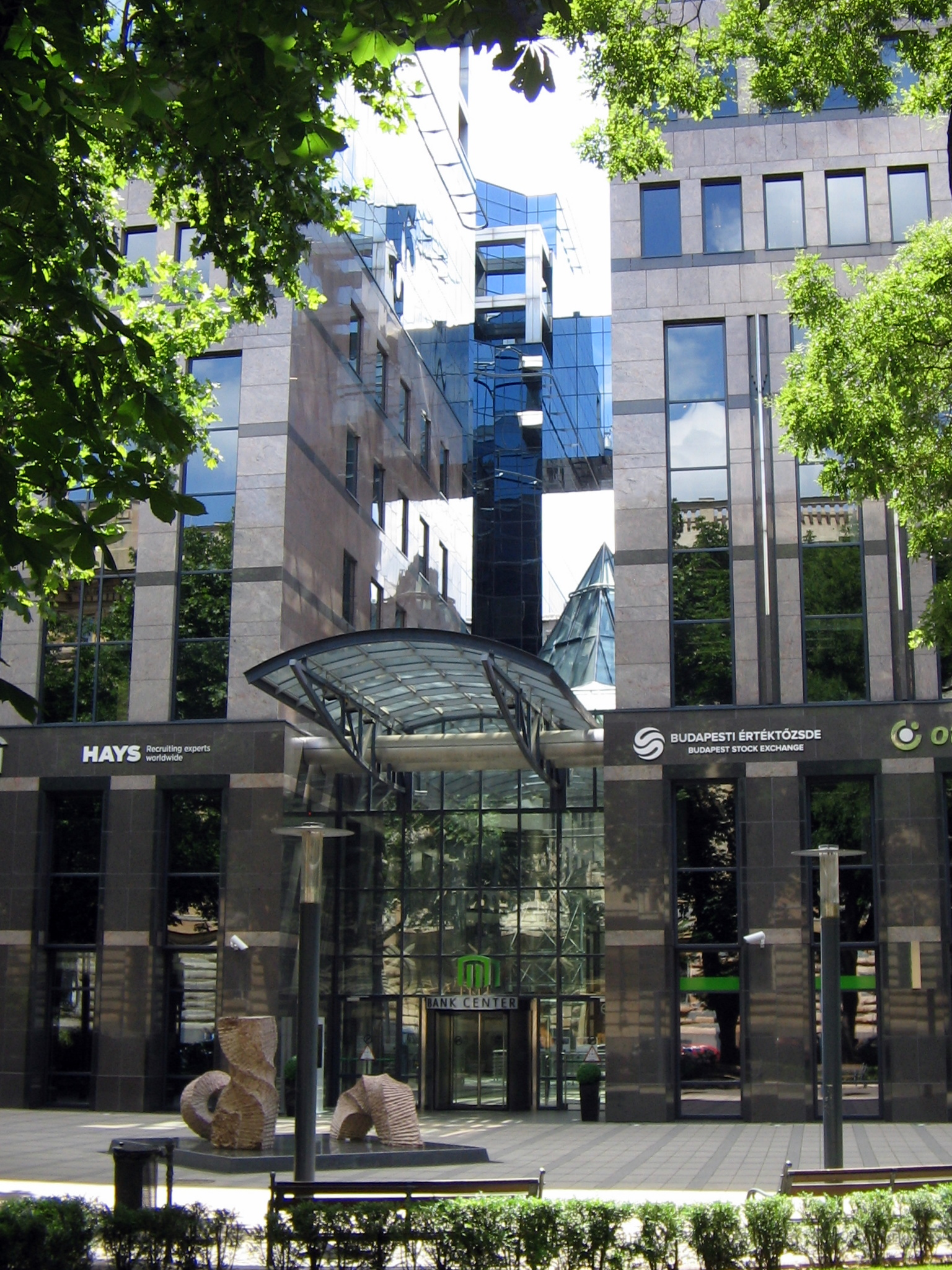
Embassy in Budapest

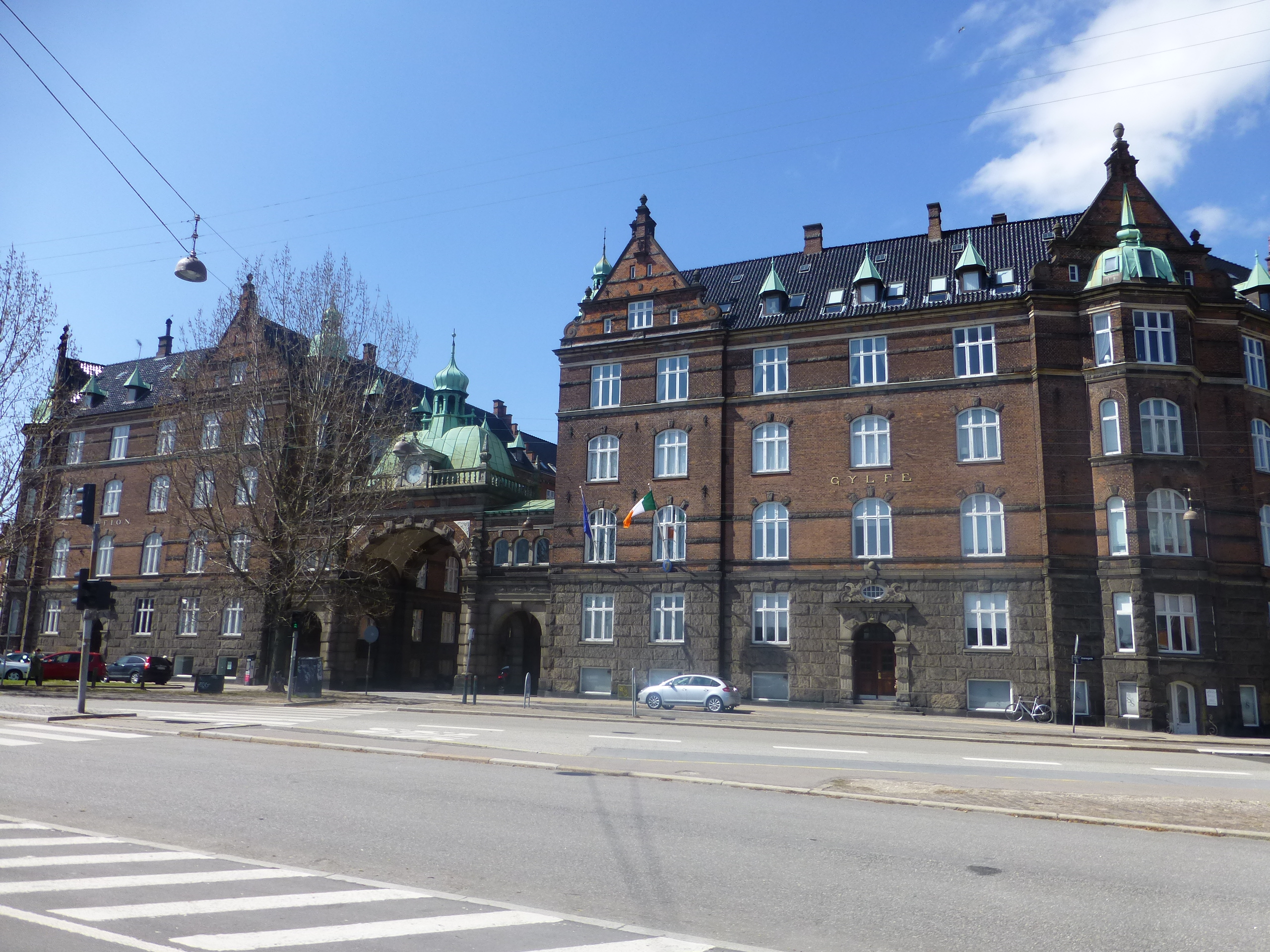
Embassy in Copenhagen

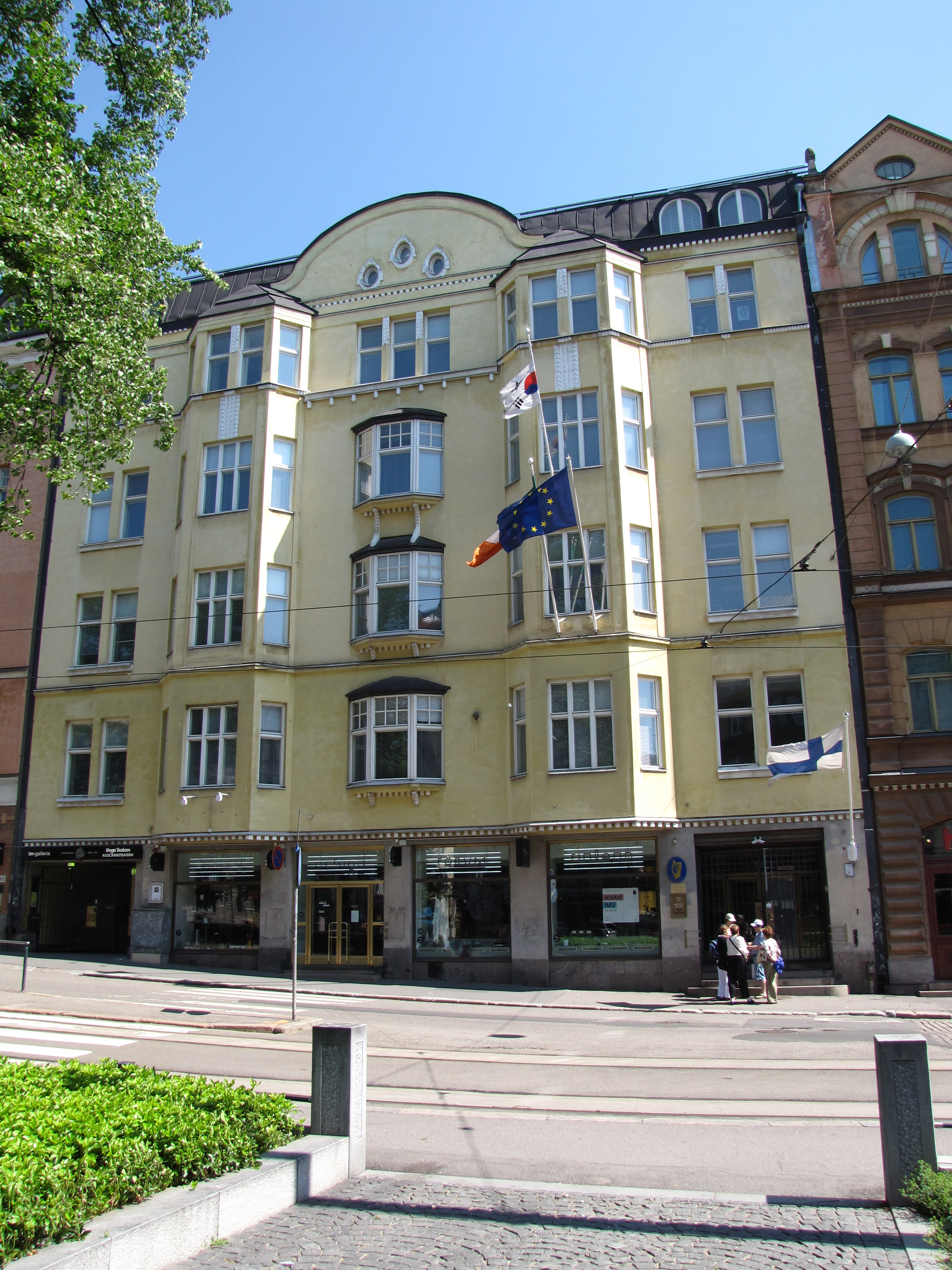
Building hosting the Embassy in Helsinki

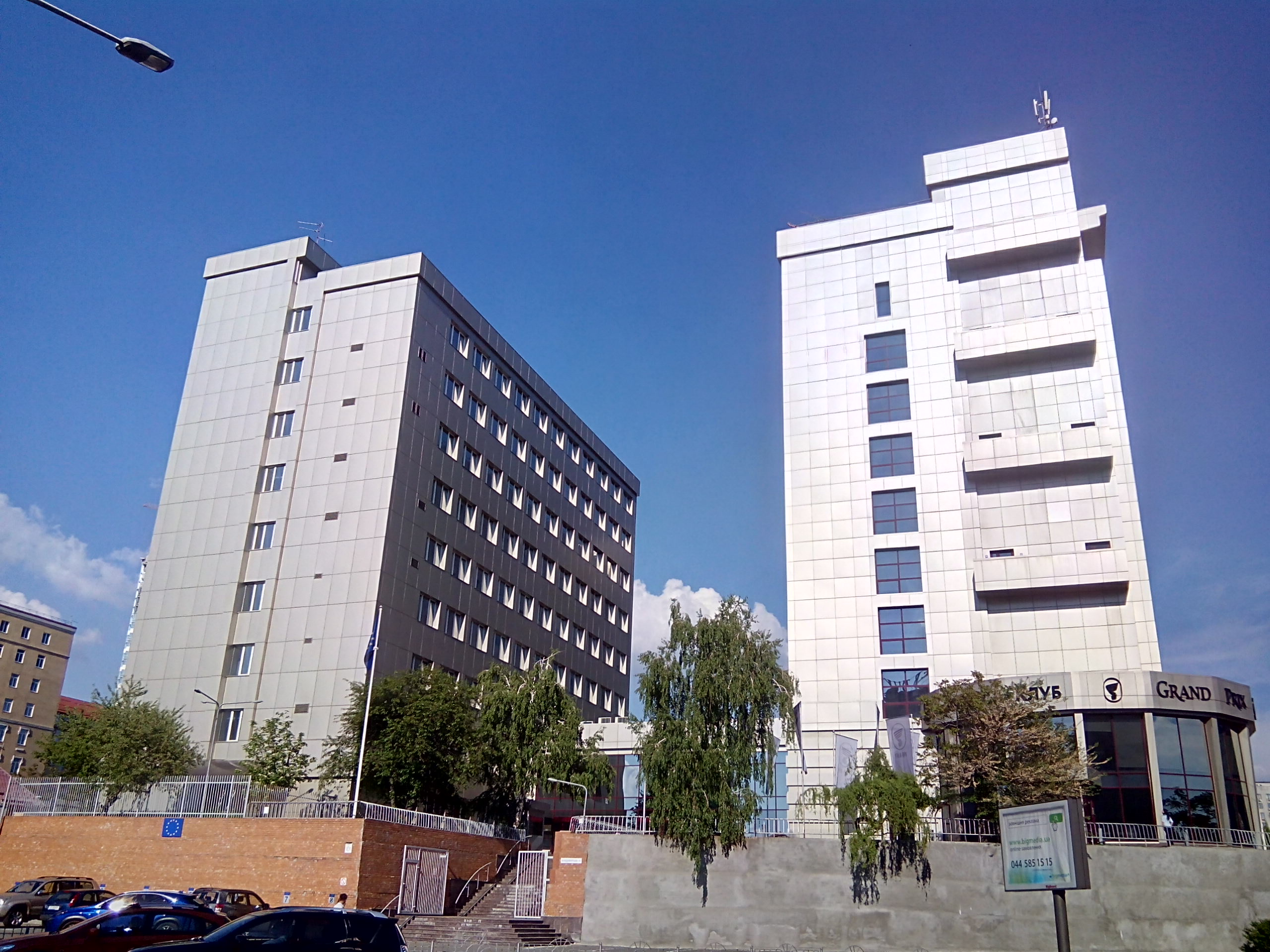
Building hosting the Embassy in Kyiv

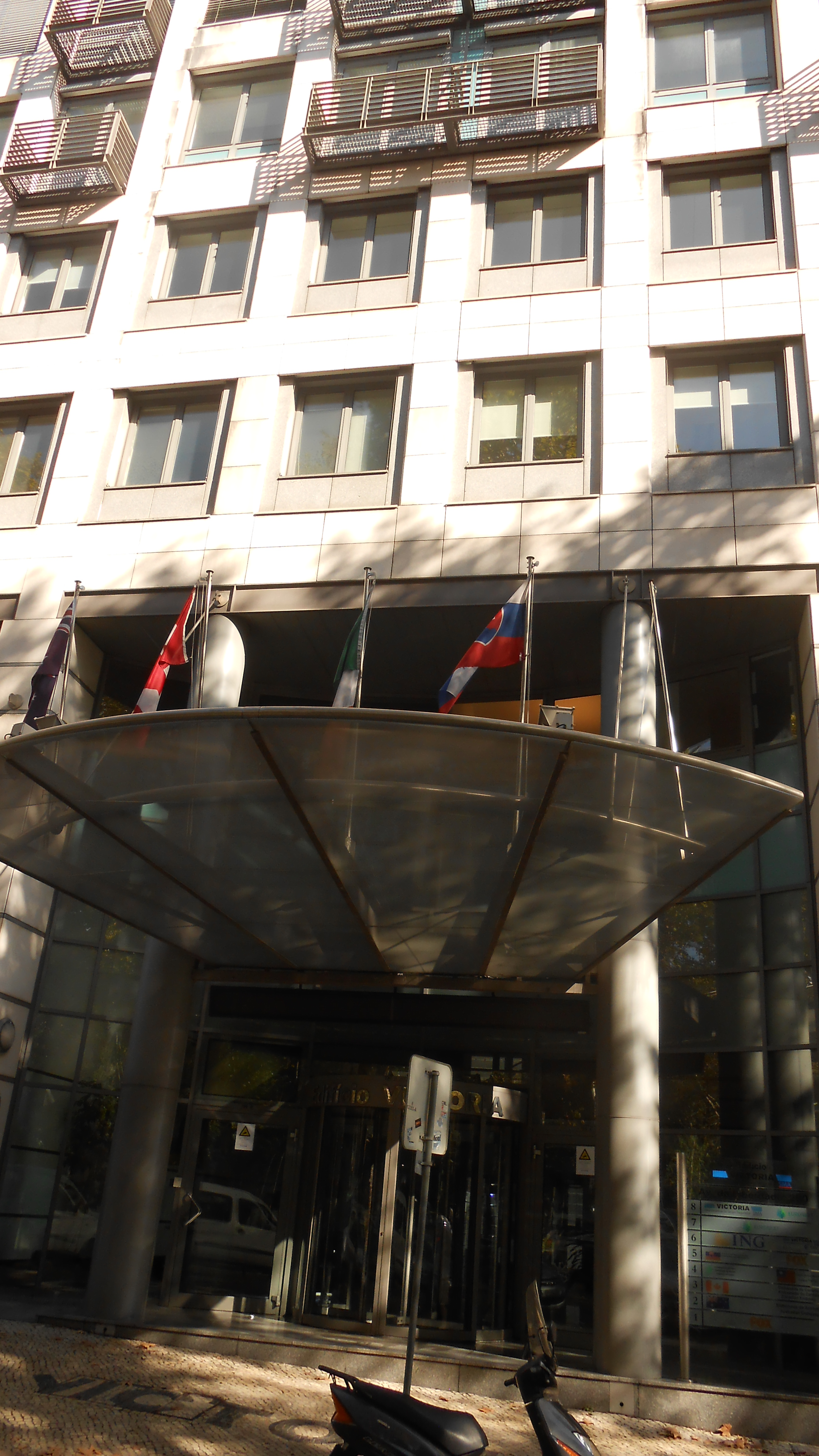
Building hosting the Embassy in Lisbon

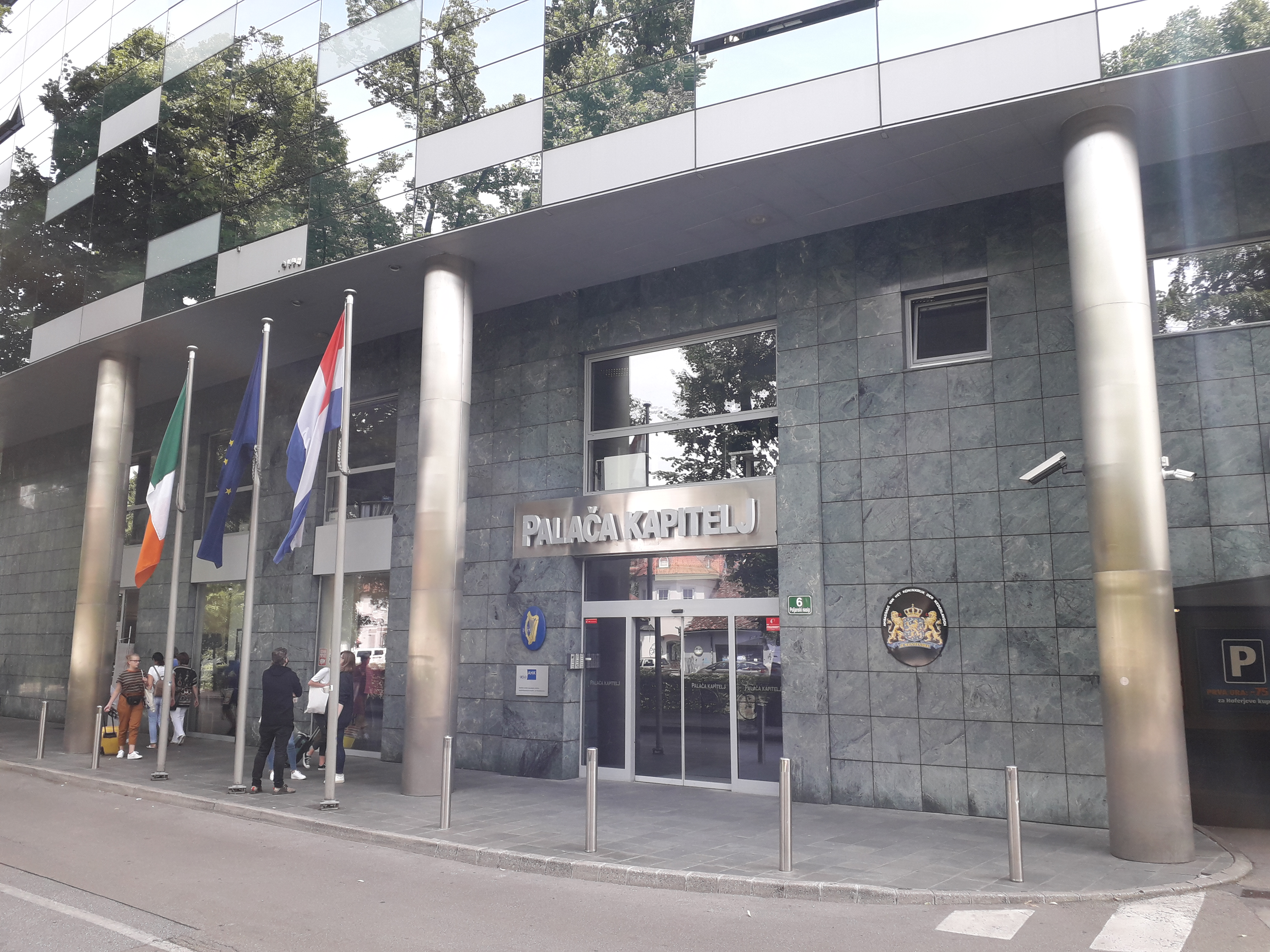
Embassy in Ljubljana

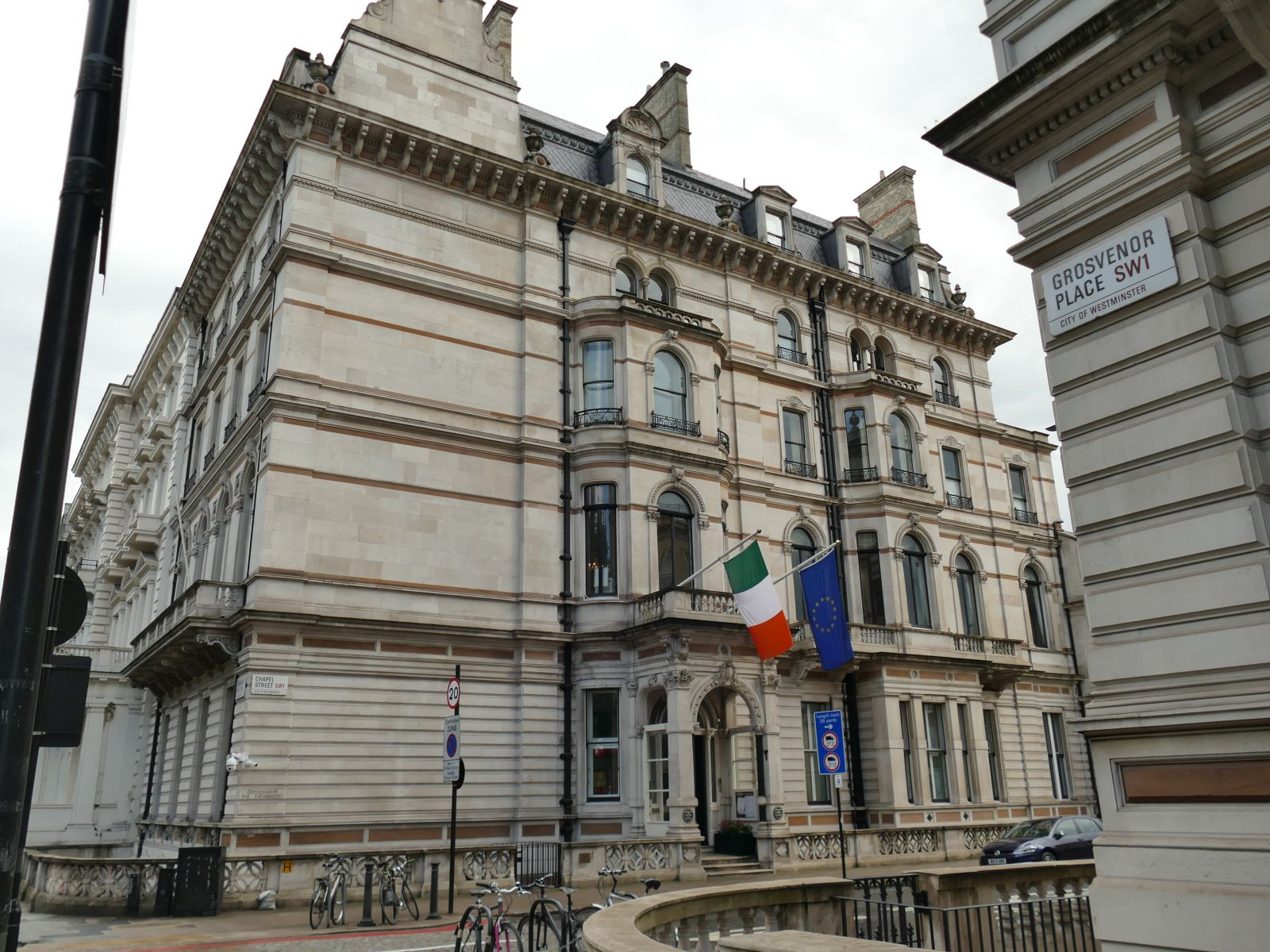
Embassy in London

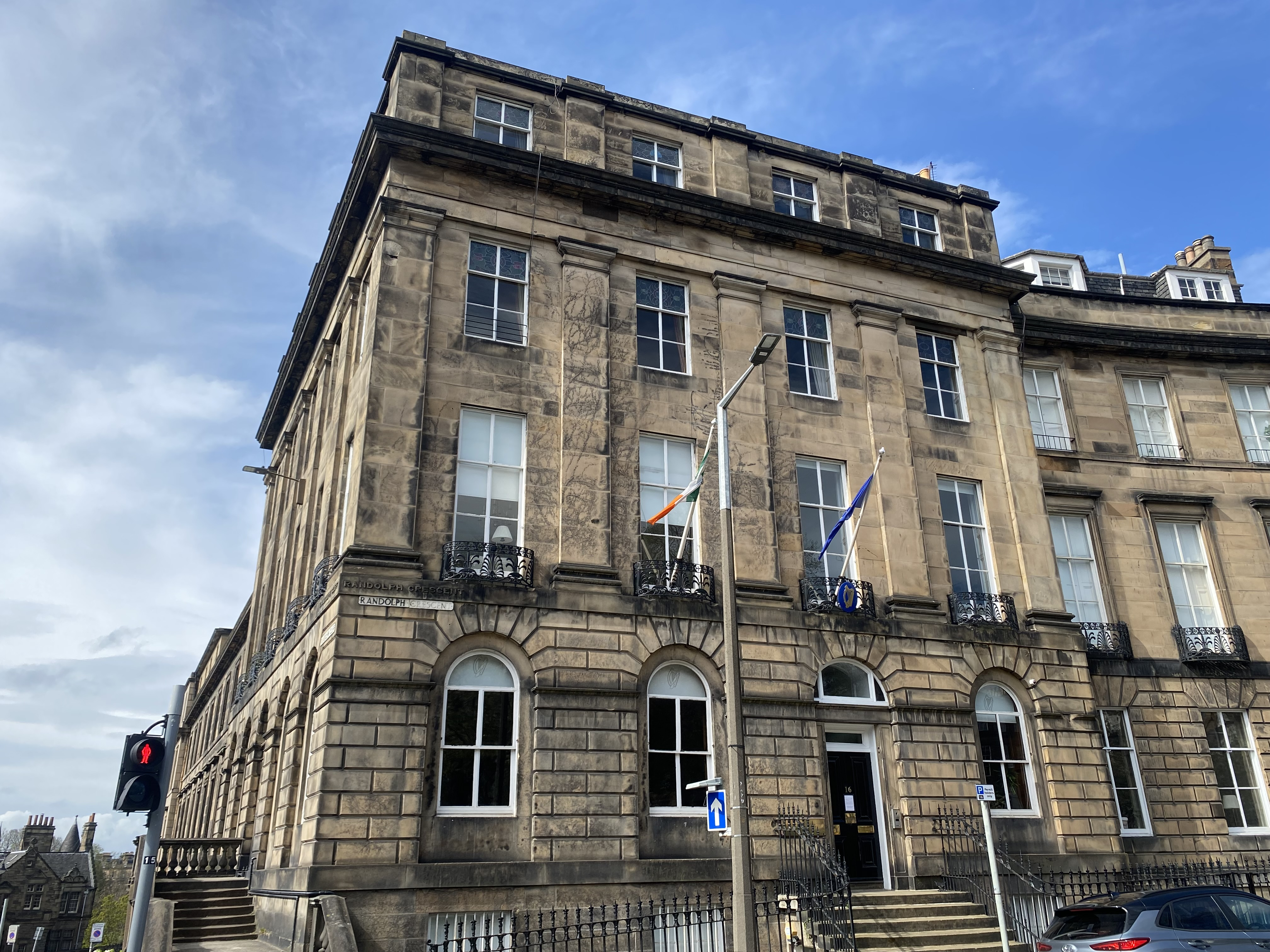
Consulate-General in Edinburgh

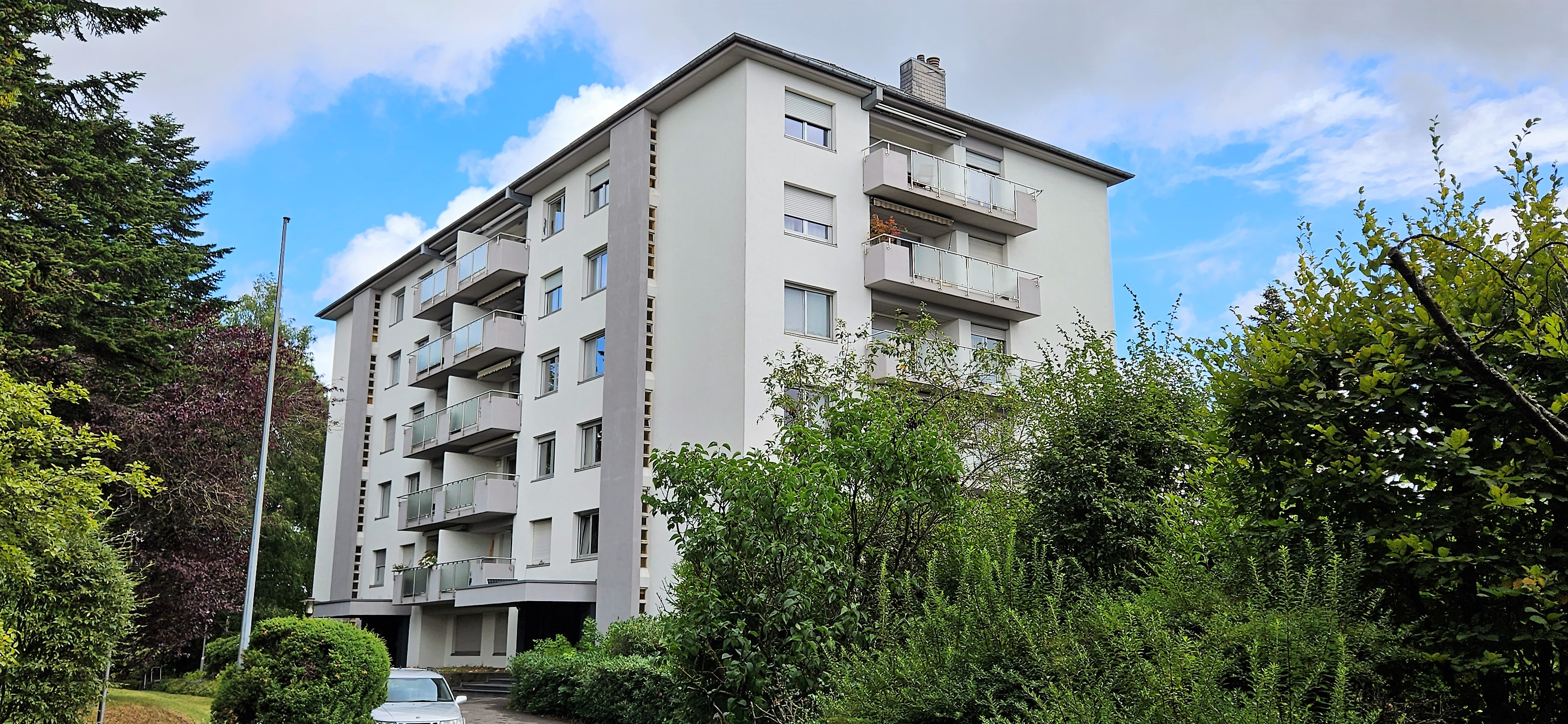
Embassy in Luxembourg

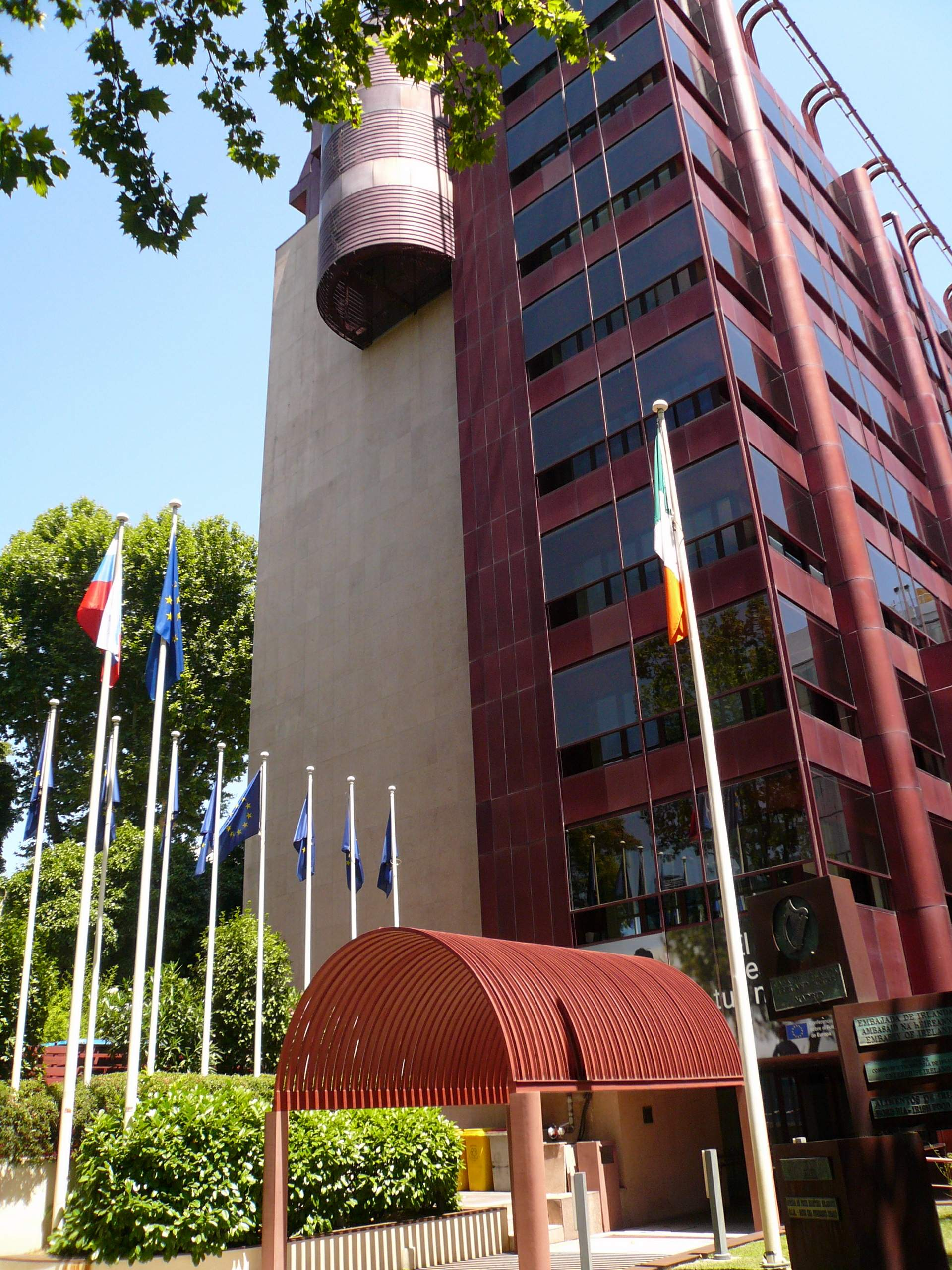
Embassy in Madrid

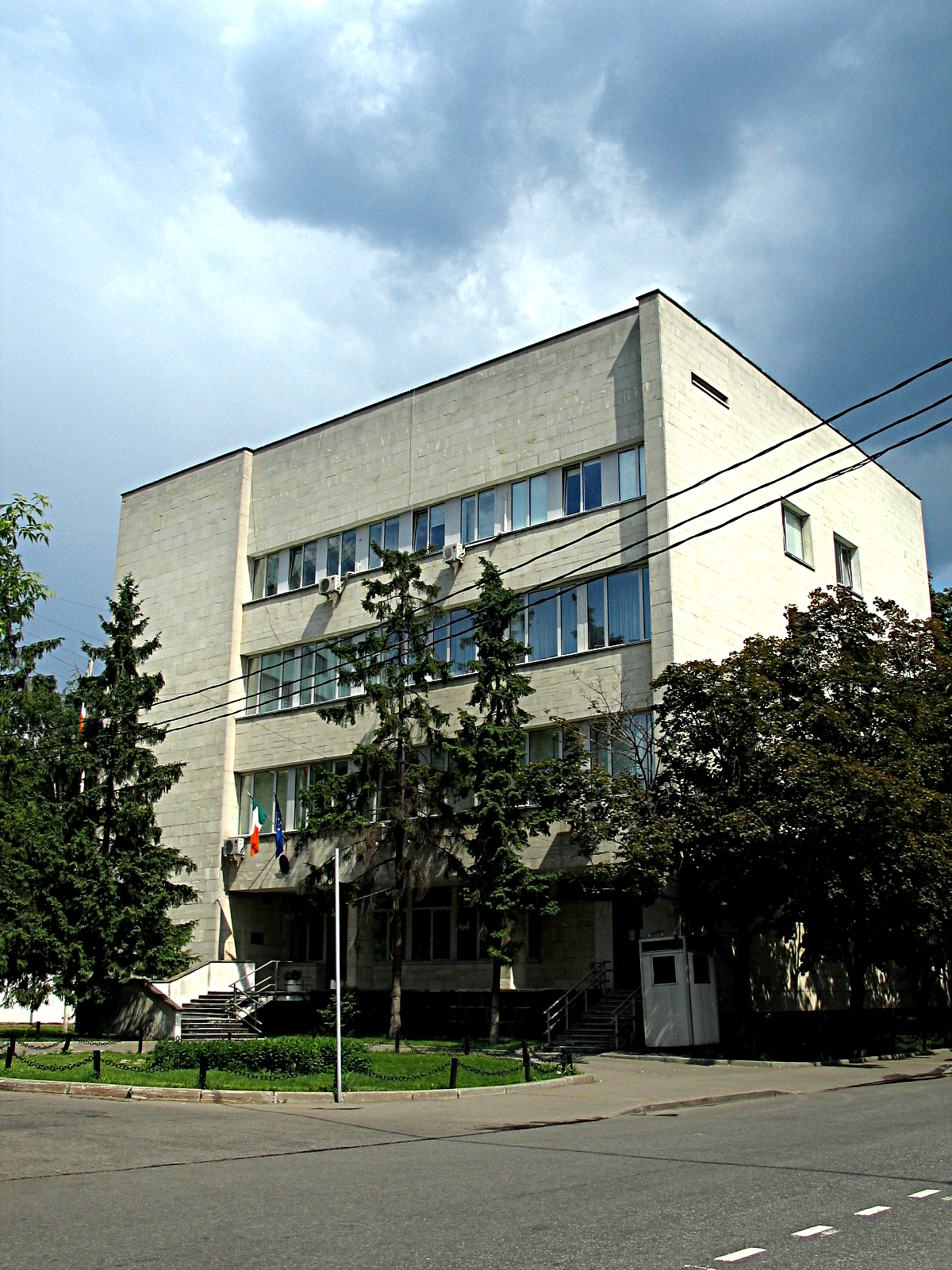
Embassy in Moscow

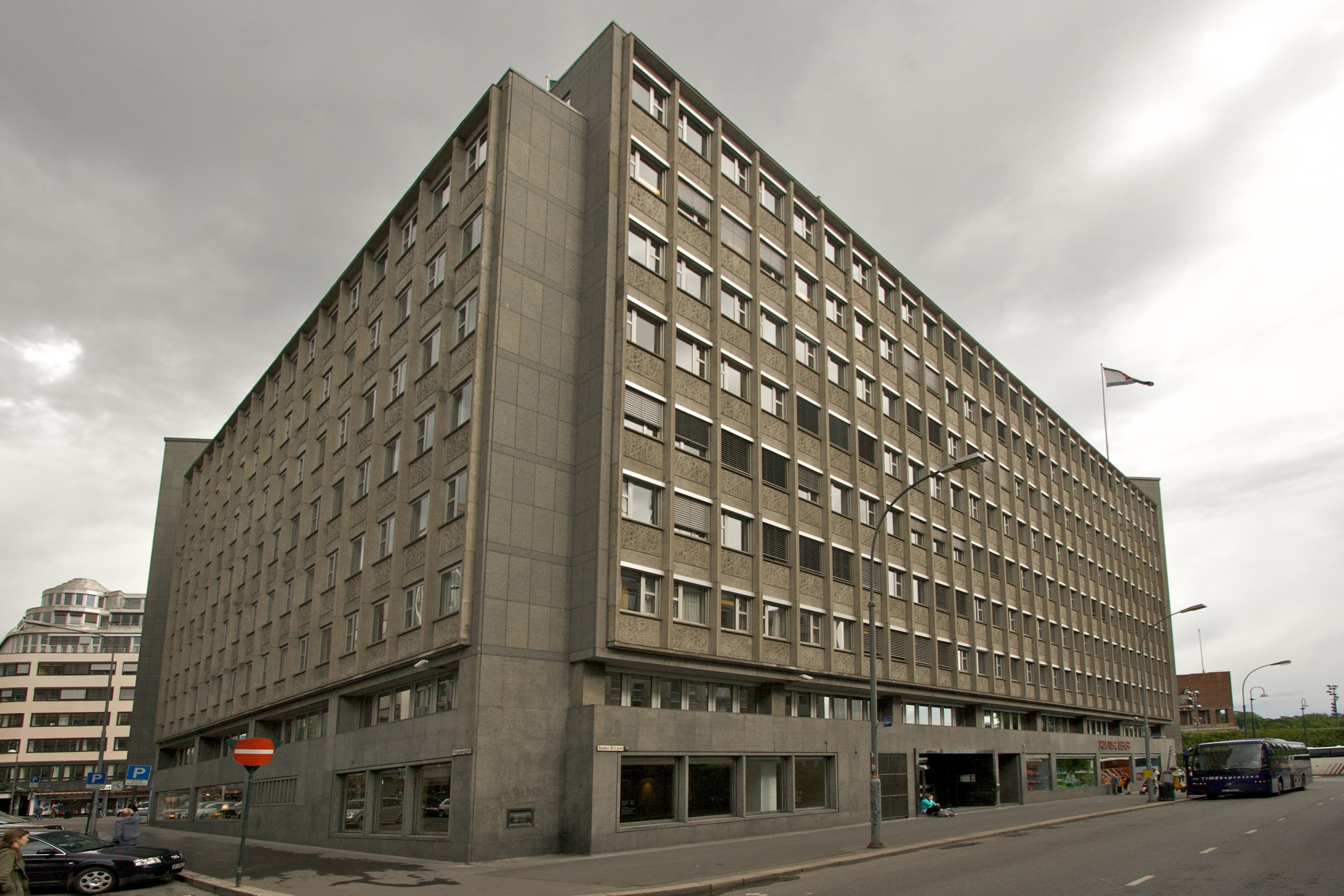
Building hosting the Embassy in Oslo

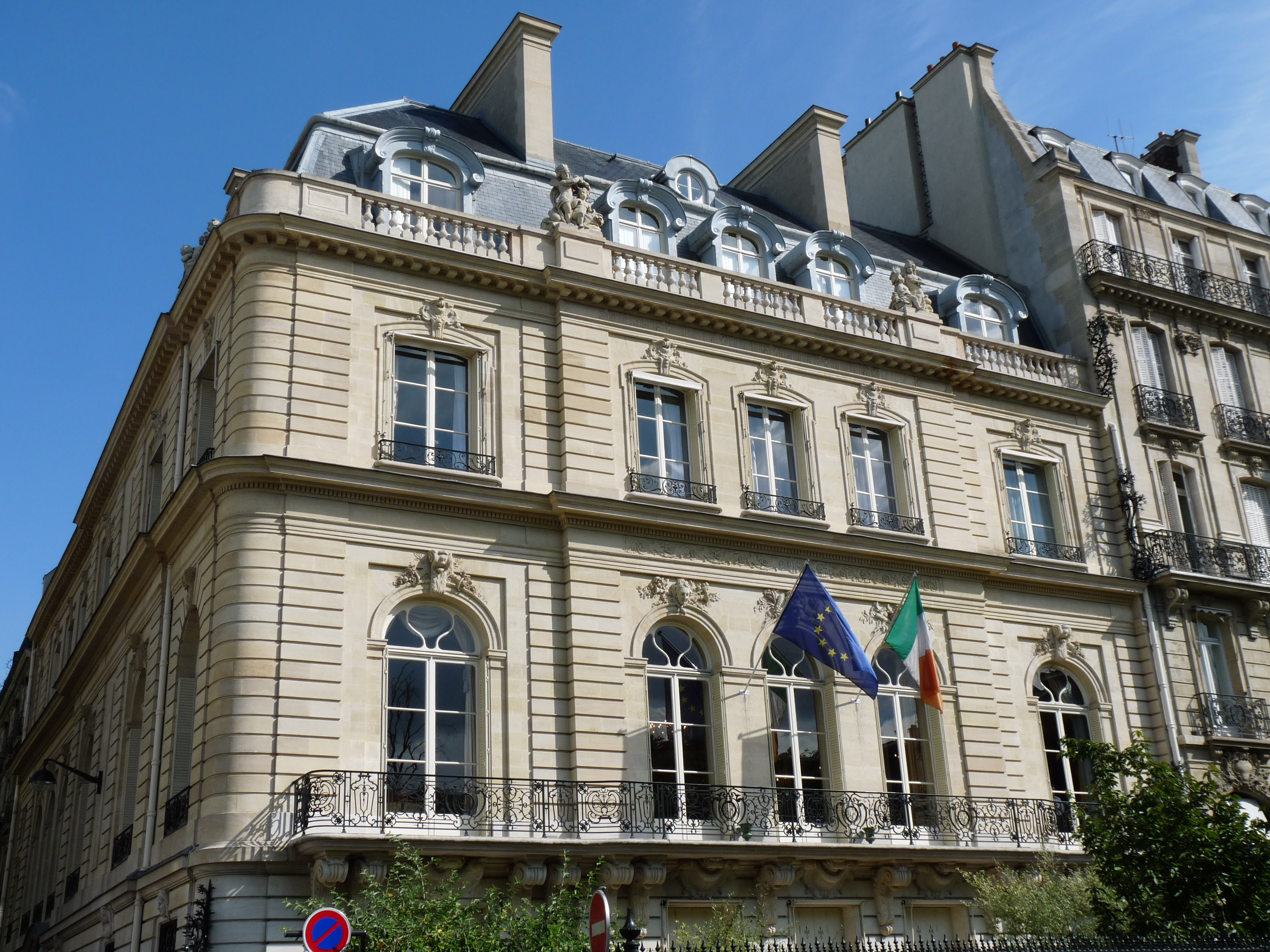
Embassy in Paris

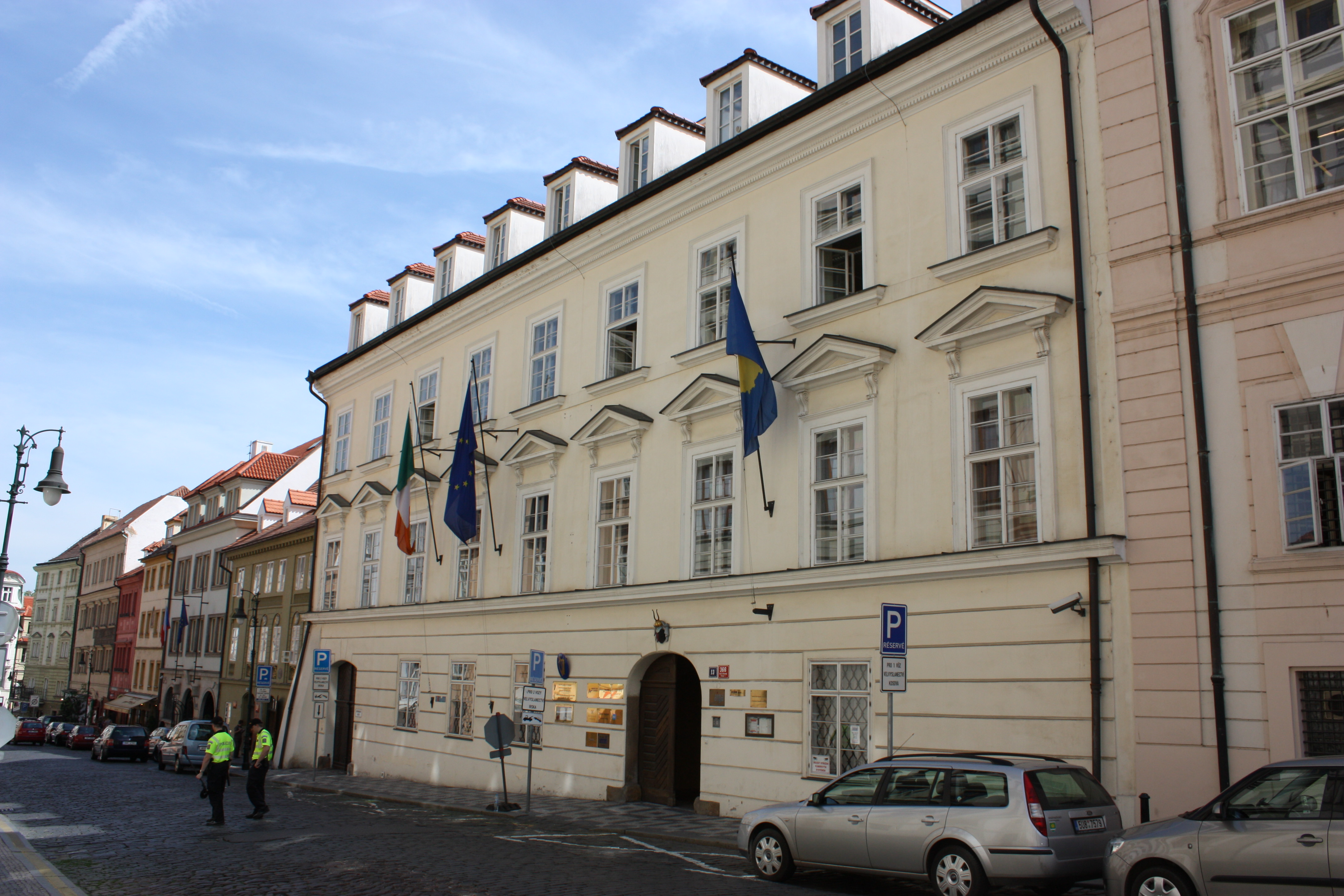
Embassy in Prague

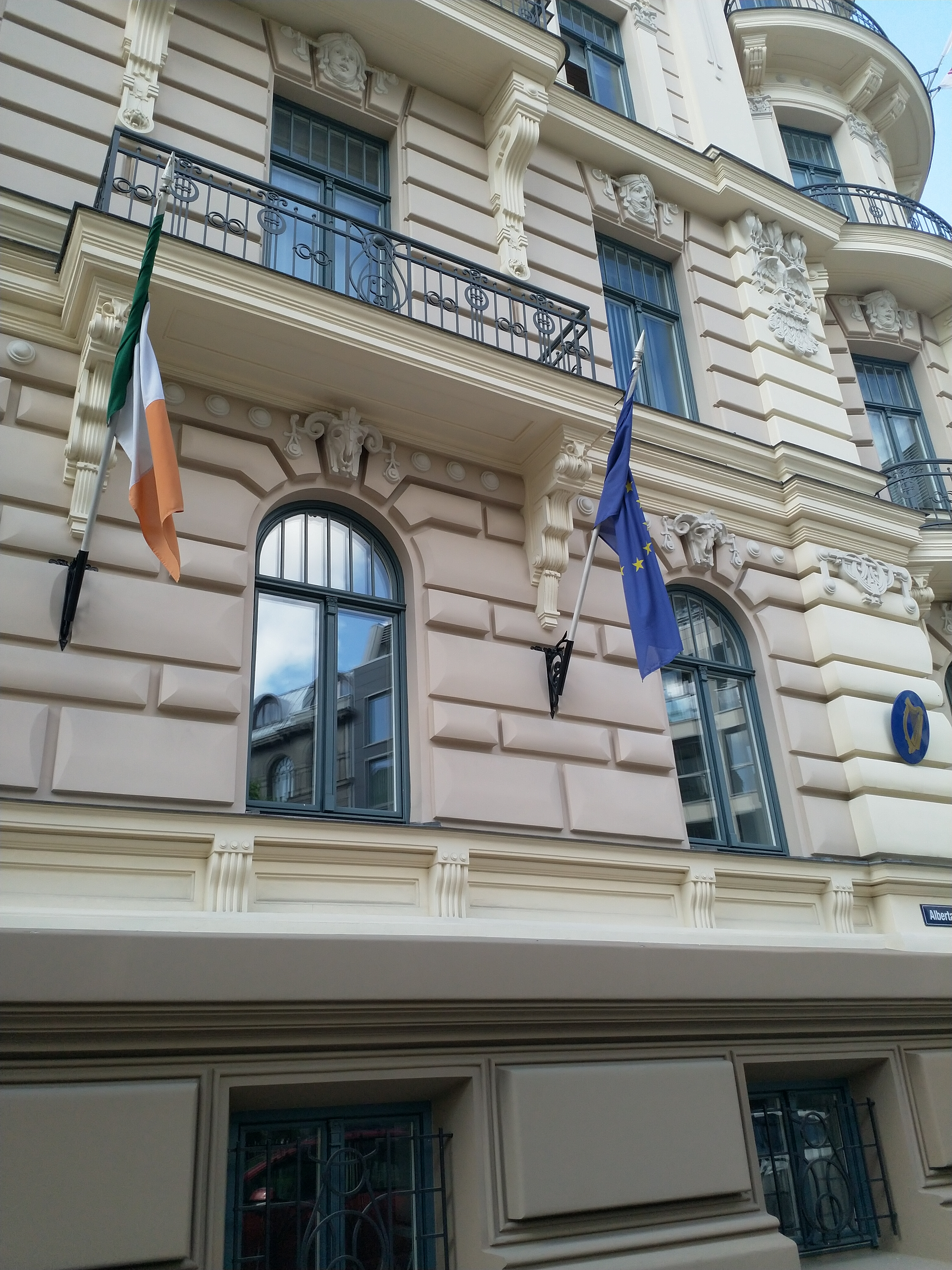
Building hosting the Embassy in Riga

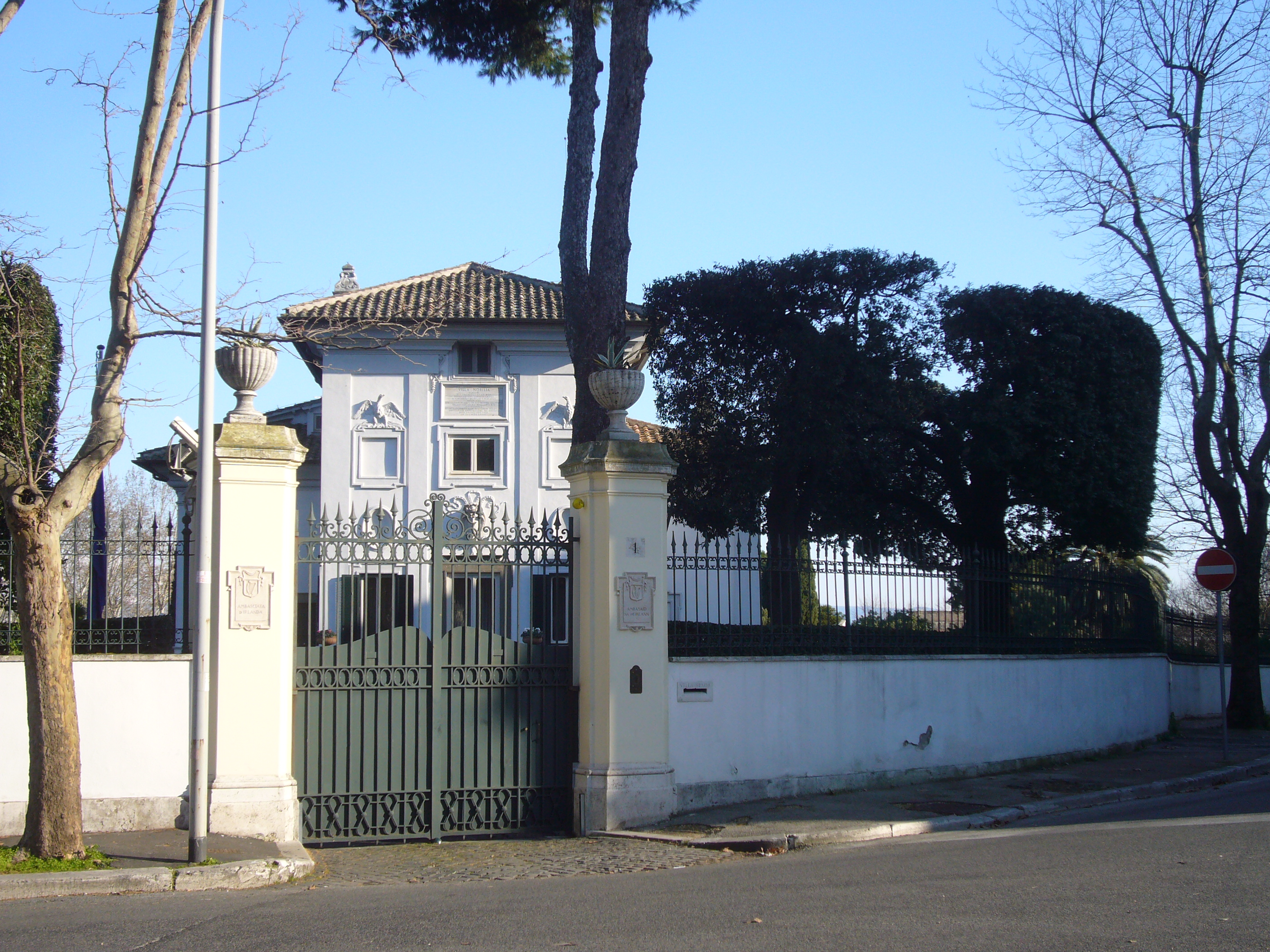
Embassy in Rome

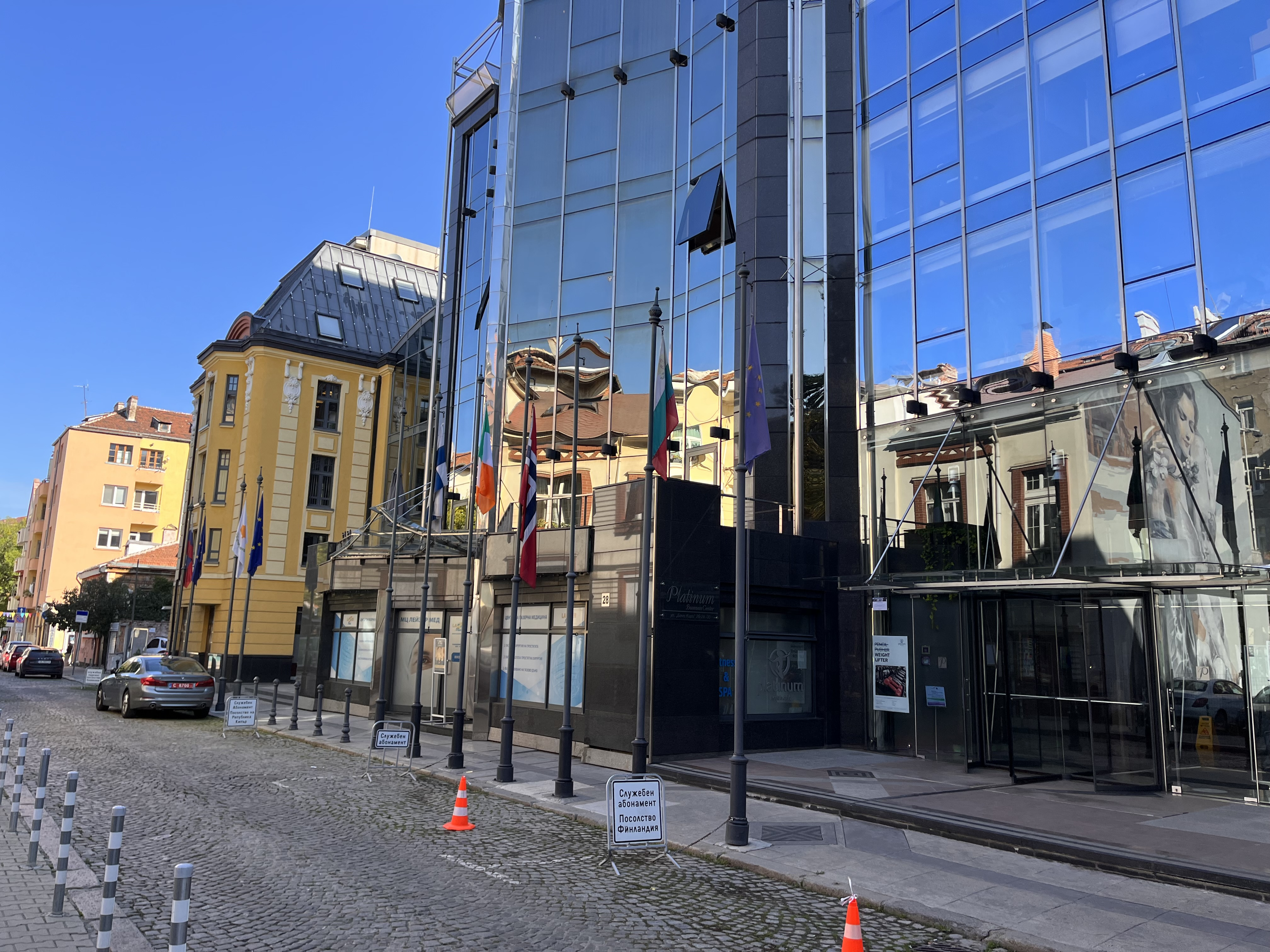
Building hosting the Embassy in Sofia

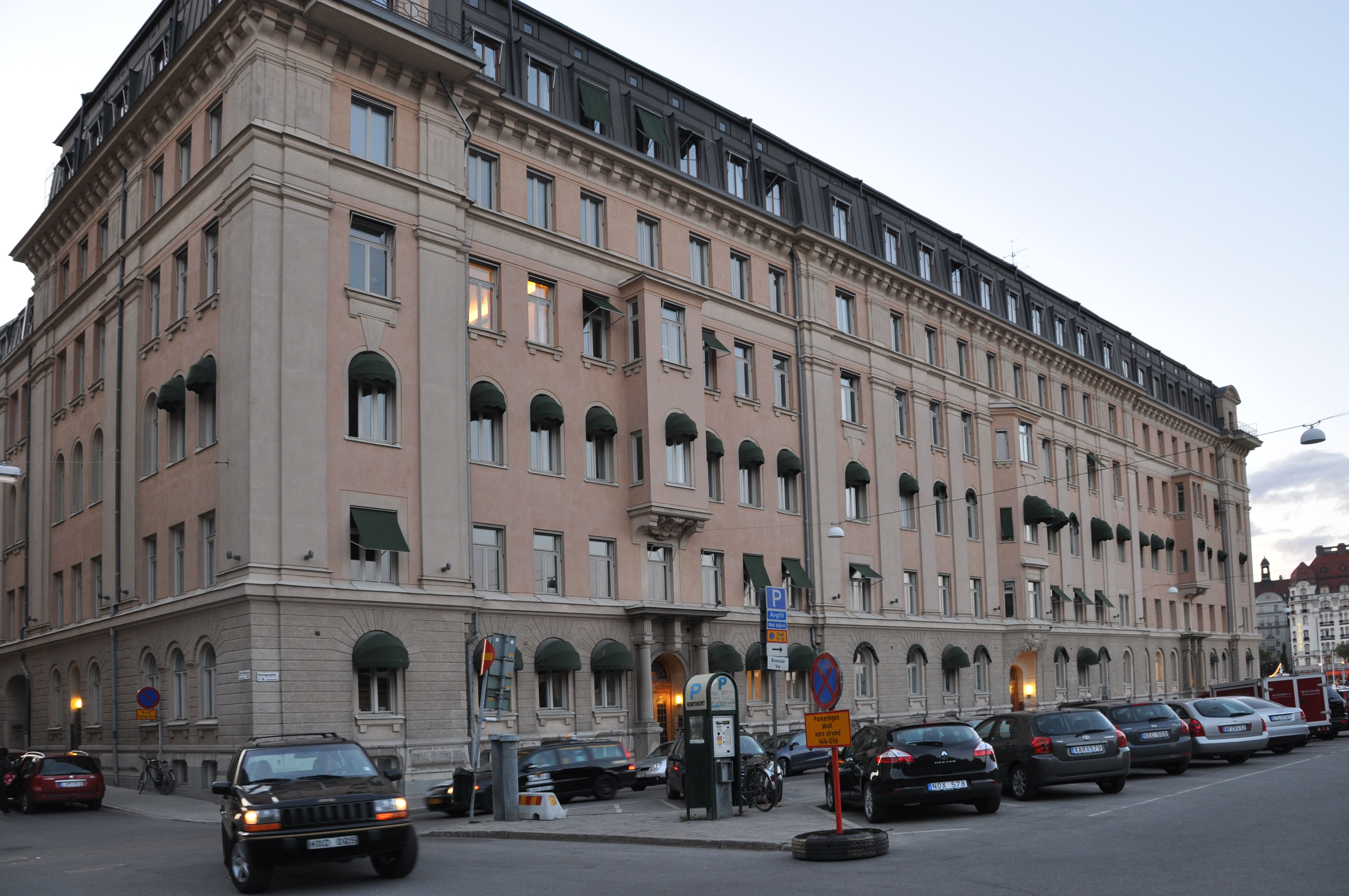
Embassy in Stockholm

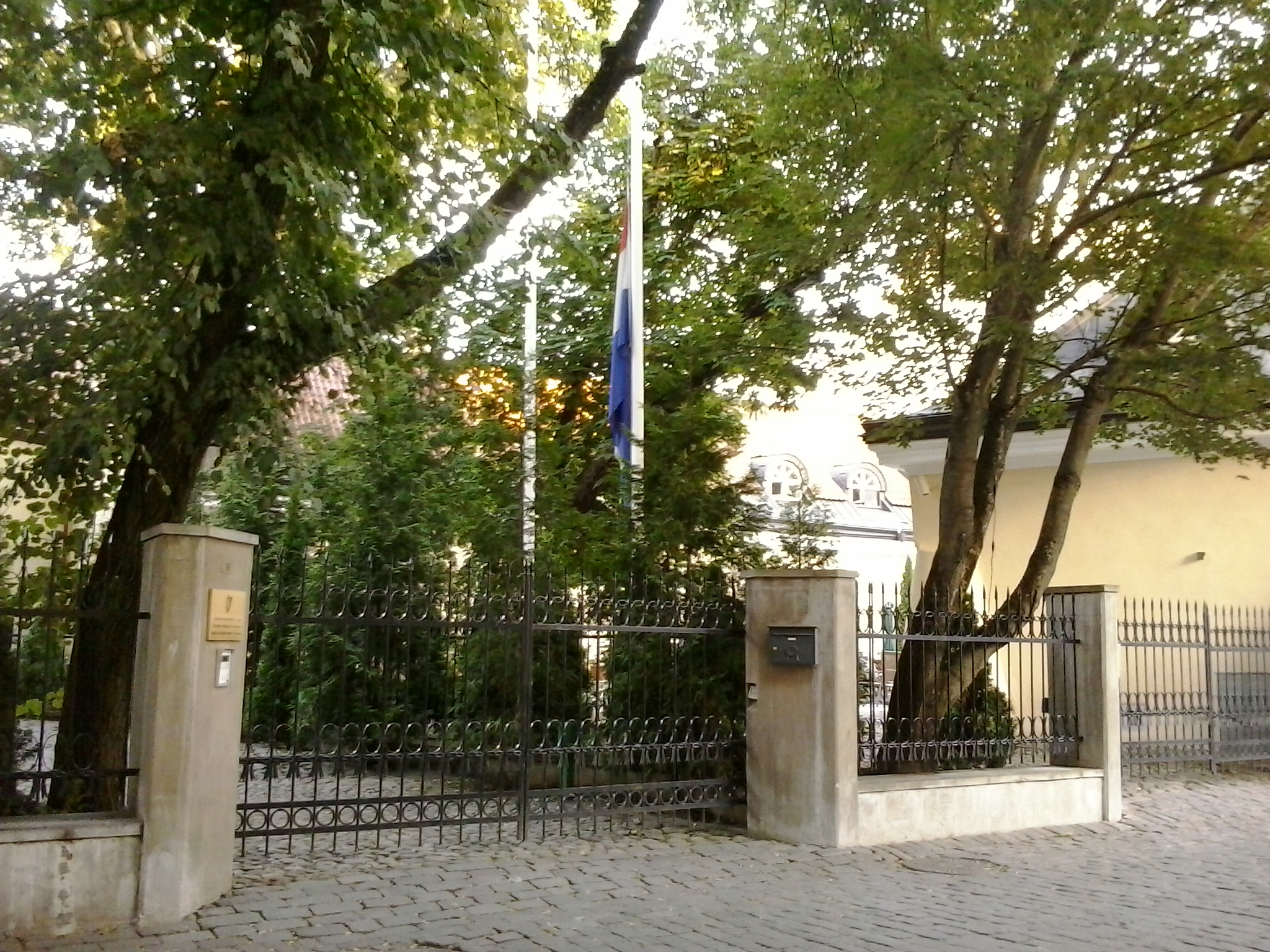
Embassy in Tallinn

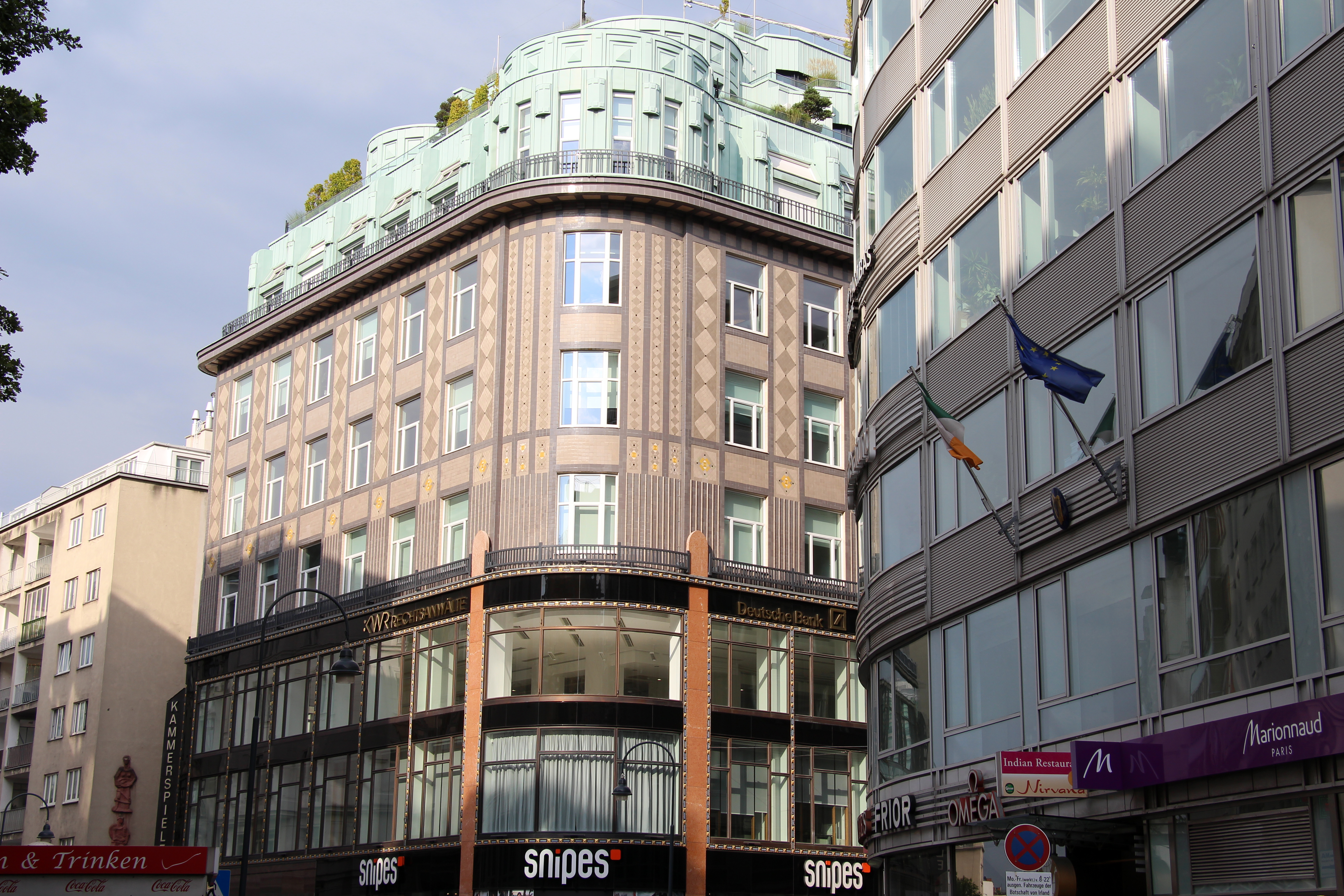
Embassy in Vienna

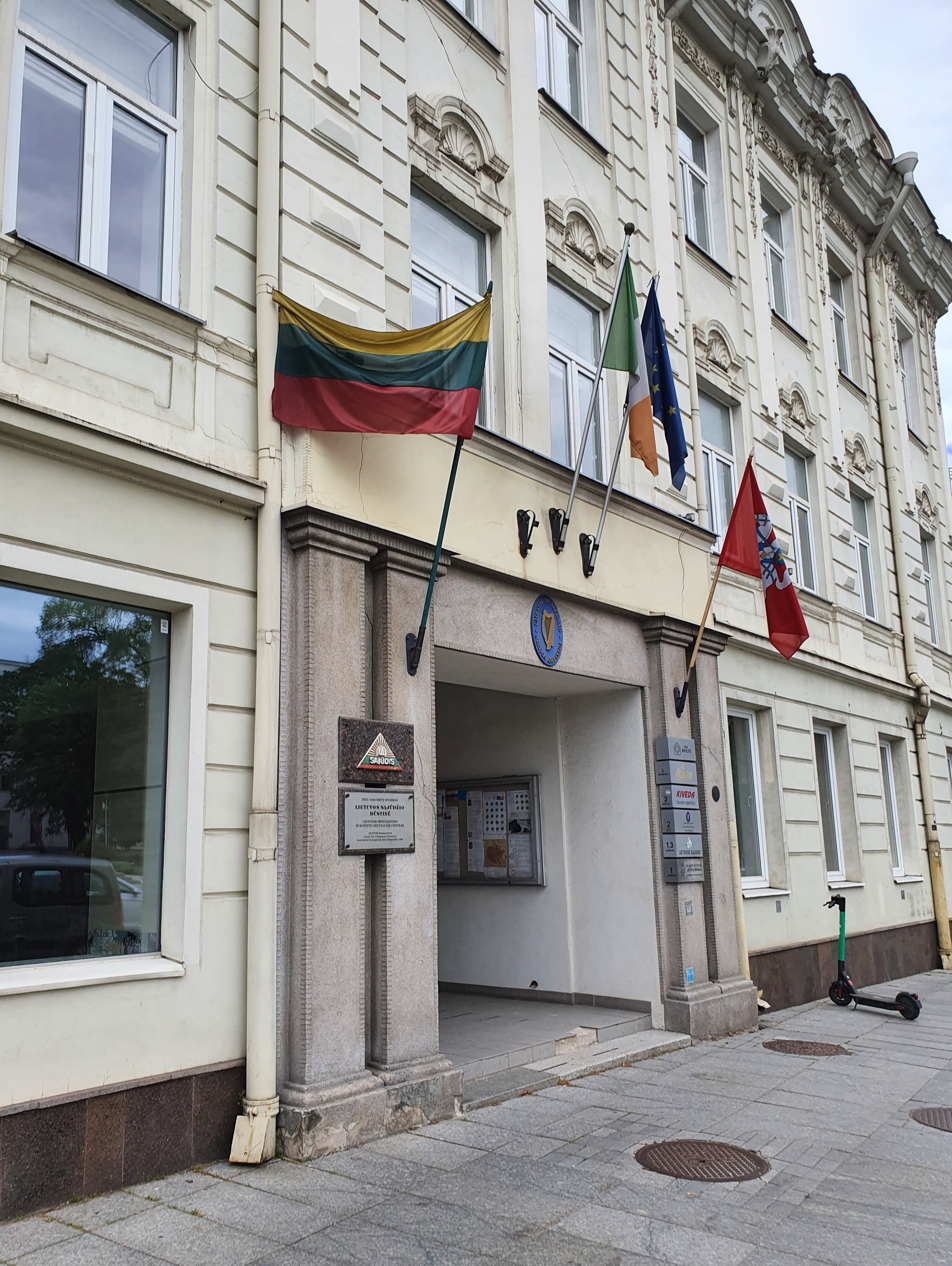
Embassy in Vilnius

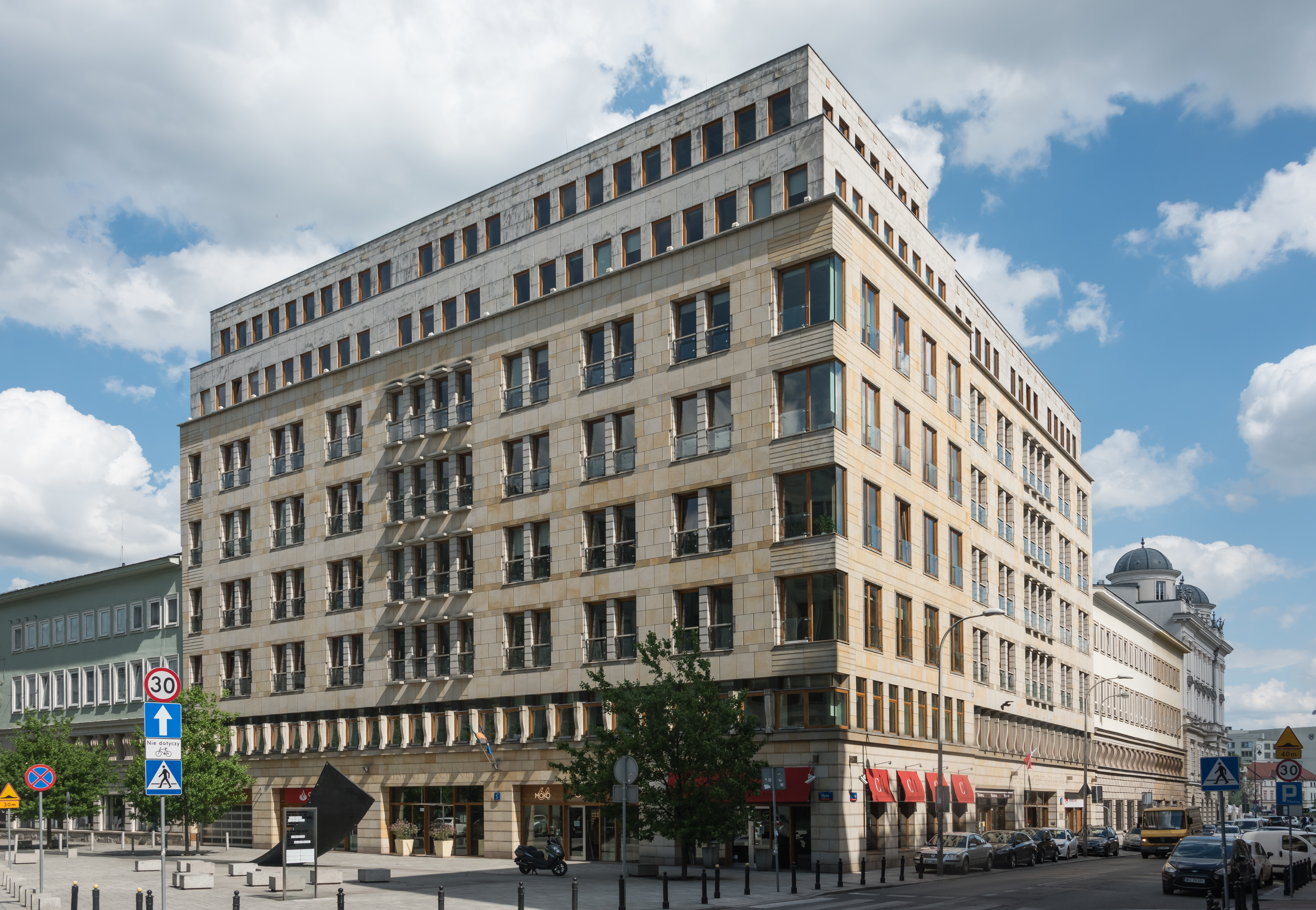
Building hosting the Embassy in Warsaw

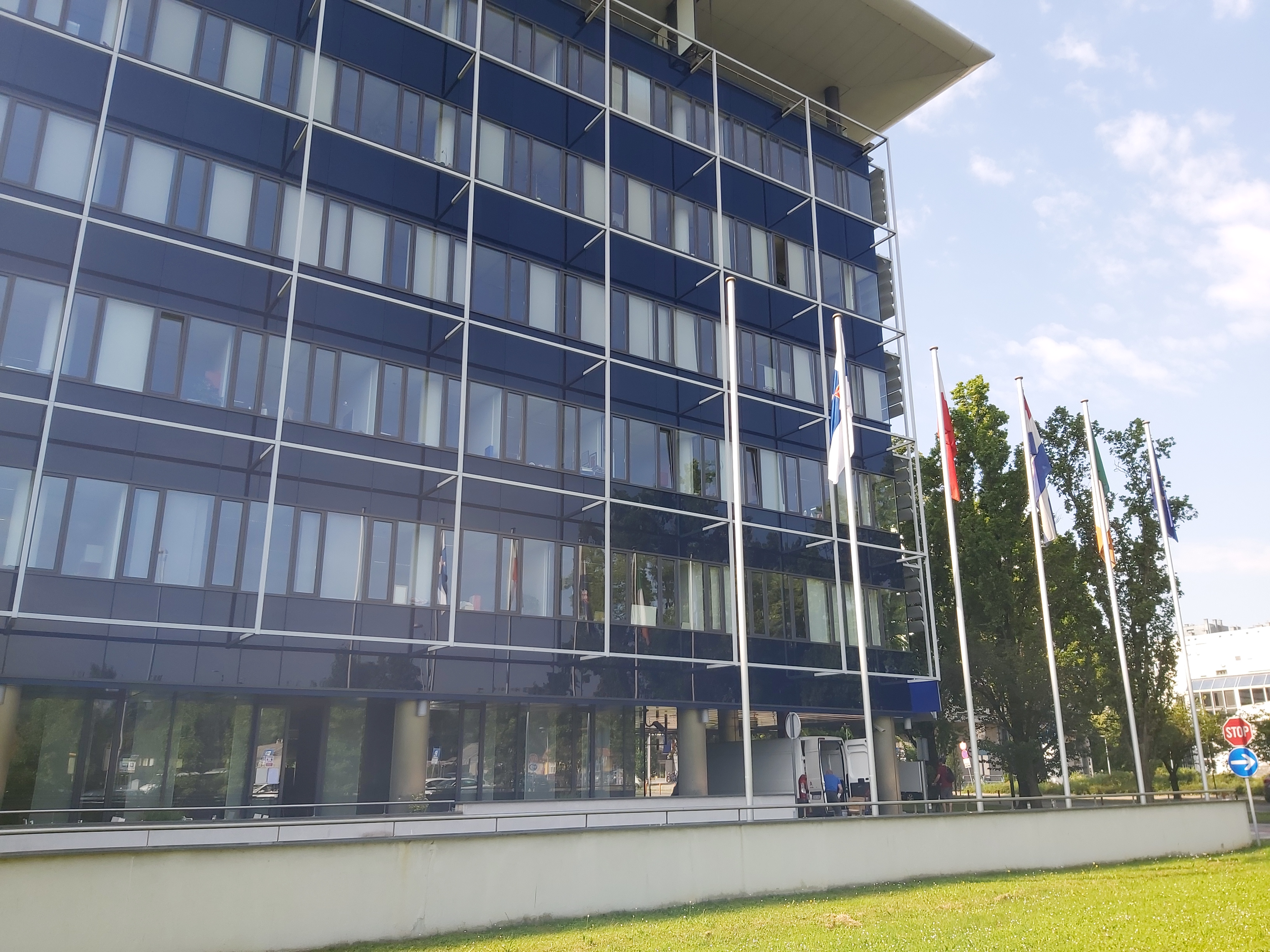
Building hosting the Embassy in Zagreb

=== Oceania ===
Host country	Host city	Mission	Year Opened	Concurrent accreditation	Ref.
Australia	Canberra	Embassy	1946	Countries: Fiji; Nauru; Papua New Guinea; Solomon Islands	
Australia	Melbourne	Consulate-General	2026	Countries: Fiji; Nauru; Papua New Guinea; Solomon Islands	
Australia	Sydney	Consulate-General	2000	Countries: Fiji; Nauru; Papua New Guinea; Solomon Islands	
New Zealand	Wellington	Embassy	2018	Countries: Cook Islands; Kiribati; Samoa; Tonga; Tuvalu; Vanuatu	

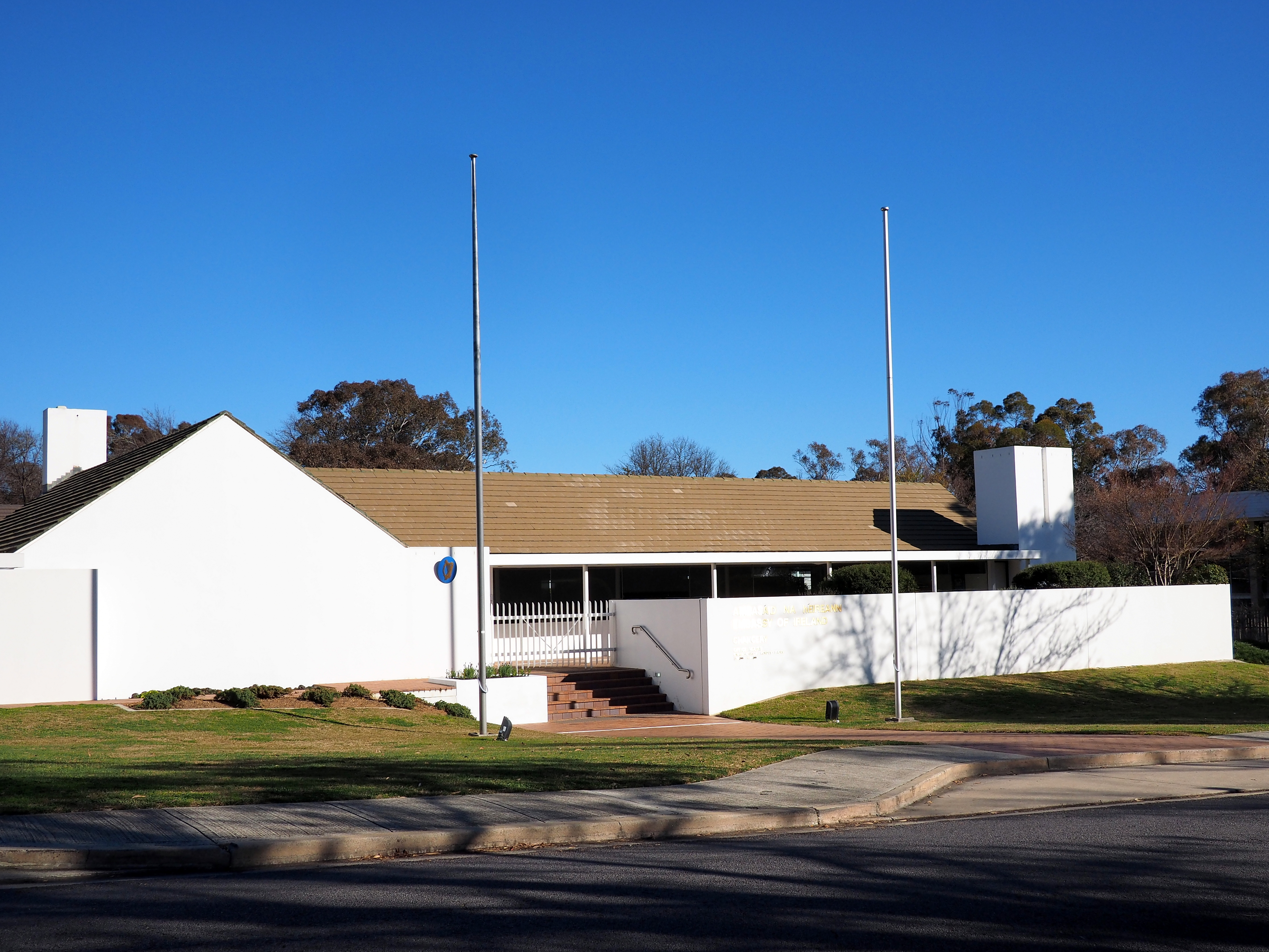
Embassy in Canberra

=== Multilateral organisations ===
Organization	Host city	Host country	Mission	Year Opened	Concurrent accreditation	Ref.
Council of Europe	Strasbourg	France	Permanent Mission			
European Union	Brussels	Belgium	Permanent Representation	1999		
OECD	Paris	France	Permanent Representation		International Organizations: UNESCO	
OSCE	Vienna	Austria	Permanent Mission	1993		
United Nations	New York City	United States	Permanent Mission	1956	Countries: Congo-Brazzaville; Haiti	
United Nations	Geneva	Switzerland	Permanent Mission	1965	International Organizations: Conference on Disarmament; World Health Organization; World Intellectual Property Organization; World Trade Organization	

== Closed missions ==
=== Africa ===
Host country	Host city	Mission	Year opened	Year closed	Ref.
Lesotho	Maseru	Embassy (Note: Resident in Pretoria, Gauteng, South Africa)	1975	2014	
South Africa	Cape Town	Liaison office	1994	Unknown	
Sudan	Khartoum	Embassy (Note: Resident in Nairobi, Kenya)	1999	2003	

=== Asia ===
Host country	Host city	Mission	Year opened	Year closed	Ref.
East Timor	Dili	Representative office (Note: Resident in Jakarta, Daerah Khusus Ibukota, Indonesia)	2003	2011	
Republic of China (Taiwan)	Taipei	Representative office	1989	2012	
Iraq	Baghdad	Embassy (Note: Resident in Amman, Jordan)	1977	1990	
Israel	Jerusalem	Consulate	1996	Unknown	
Lebanon	Beirut	Embassy (Note: Resident in Cairo, Egypt)	1974, 1979	1977, 1989	
Qatar	Doha	Embassy (Note: Resident in Abu Dhabi, United Arab Emirates)	1979	1995	

=== Europe ===
Host country	Host city	Mission type	Year opened	Year closed	Ref.
West Germany	Hamburg	Consulate-General	1962	1982	

== Missions to open ==
In September 2022, Minister for Foreign affairs Simon Coveney announced the creation the last 8 missions out of 26 in Global Ireland 2025 In March 2024 Irish foreign minister want to open 5 more missions.

Missions announced in 2003

- Iraq
  - Baghdad (Embassy)

Missions announced in 2019

- Bangladesh
  - Dhaka (Embassy)

Missions announced in 2020

- Qatar
  - Doha (Embassy)

Missions announced in 2024

- Spain
  - Málaga (Consulate General)

== See also ==
- Foreign relations of Ireland
- Department of Foreign Affairs and Trade (Ireland)
- List of diplomatic missions in Ireland
- Visa policy of Ireland
- Irish Aid
