= Embassy of Ireland, Wellington =

Diplomatic mission of Ireland to New Zealand

Embassy of Ireland in Wellington
- Location: Level 10, 86 Victoria Street, Wellington 6011
- Coordinates: 41.2886870°S 174.7758272°E
- Relocated: 17 March 2023
- Ambassador: Jane Connolly
- Website: https://www.ireland.ie/en/new-zealand/wellington/

The Embassy of Ireland in New Zealand (Irish: Ambasáid na hÉireann Nua-Shealainne; Māori: Te Aka Aorere o Airangi) is the diplomatic mission of the Republic of Ireland to New Zealand. Formally established in 2018 within the EU delegation to New Zealand, the current chancery opened in 2023.

== History ==
Prior to the establishment of an embassy in Wellington, the Irish ambassador to Australia was accredited to New Zealand. Plans to open embassies in each others' countries were announced in 2017 during a state visit by Irish President Michael D. Higgins, with warm relations, similar foreign policy stances and significant trade ties, as well as the geopolitical impact of Brexit being the main reasons for the decision.

The embassy opened in 2018, with Peter Ryan being the first ambassador to New Zealand, hosted by the EU delegation to New Zealand at Solnet House, 70 The Terrace in Wellington.

The current chancery and the first independent location was officially opened on St. Patrick's Day in 2023 by the newly appointed ambassador Jane Connolly and Minister for Agriculture, Food and the Marine Charlie McConalogue.

== List of ambassadors to New Zealand ==
- Peter Ryan, 2018–2022
- Jane Connolly, 2022–present

== See also ==
- Ireland-New Zealand relations
- Foreign Relations of Ireland
- Foreign Relations of New Zealand
