= Lady Bridget Poulett =

English socialite (1912–1978)

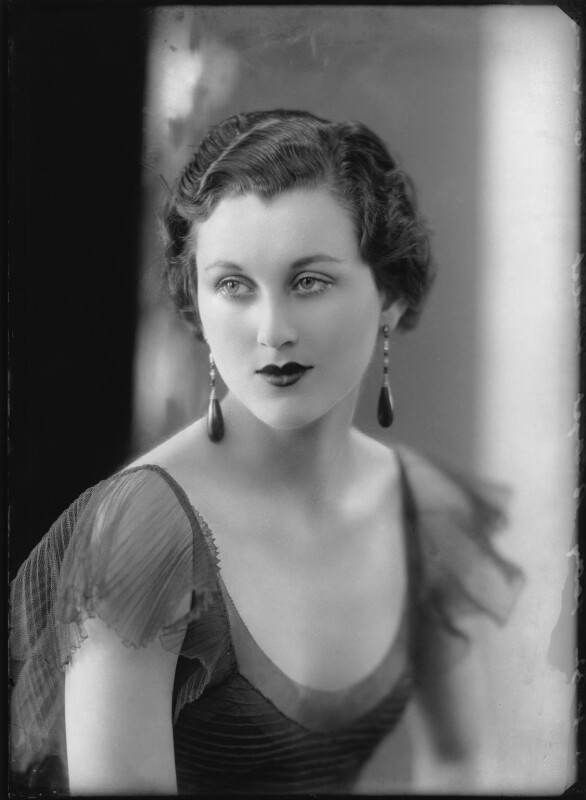
- Lady Bridget Poulett, by Bassano Ltd, 1933
- Born: Bridget Elizabeth Felicia Henrietta Augusta Poulett; 29 January 1912
- Died: 31 July 1978 (aged 66); Bogotá, Columbia
- Occupations: Socialite; model

Lady Bridget Elizabeth Felicia Henrietta Augusta Poulett (29 January 1912 – 31 July 1978), was an English socialite, sometime model of Cecil Beaton.

== Biography ==
Lady Bridget Elizabeth Felicia Henrietta Augusta Poulett was born on 29 January 1912, the daughter of William Poulett, 7th Earl Poulett, and Sylvia Lilian Storey, an actress and Gaiety girl.

Lady Bridget Poulett was considered one of the great Society Beauties of the 1930s. She was famous for her green almond eyes and jet-black hair. She was photographed by all the leading photographers of the day. A famous 1920 photo by Cecil Beaton depicts Baba Beaton, Wanda Baillie-Hamilton and Lady Bridget Poulett. She was one of a series of society beauties photographed as classical figures by Madame Yevonde.

In June 1932, Lady Bridget Poulett, together with Baba Beaton, Lady Patricia Moore, Jeanne Stourton, Molly Vaughan, Katherine Horlick, Margaret Livingstone-Learmonth and Priscilla Weigall, considered among the most beautiful debutantes of 1932, were supposed to be the bridesmaids to the wedding of Miss Margaret Whigham to Charles Greville, 7th Earl of Warwick, but the engagement was broken in April. In the end, she was a bridesmaid when Whigham married Charles Francis Sweeny, an American golfer.

In January 1933, she was the bridesmaid of Nancy Beaton who was marrying Sir Hugh Houston Smiley, 3rd Baronet (1905–1990). The dresses were designed by Cecil Beaton and among the other bridesmaids there were Baba Beaton, Margaret Whigham, and Lady Anne Wellesley.

On 20 March 1933, she was a model for the 24th Birthday Celebrations and opening of the new building of Selfridge's; it was advertised as a Fashion Premiere presented by Society Beauties, and the other models were: Baba Beaton, Betty Colclough, Dorothy Hyson, Averil Streatfield, Audrey Simpson, Peta Dundas, Hilary Charles, Mona Simpson and Pat Charles; directing the parades was Jeanne Stourton.

In April 1934, she did a charitable fashion parade in aid of the Manchester Babies' Hospital organized by Finnigans in conjunction with Norman Hartnell.

In March 1935, she was the bridesmaid of Lady Norah Jellicoe marrying Edward William Rhys Wingfield. The other bridesmaids were: Lady Gwendoline Jellicoe, Lady Prudence Jellicoe, Avice Cayzer, Pamela Blackett and Bridget Smiley. In November 1935, her name was linked to that of George II of Greece together with Primrose Salt, Lady Mary Lygon, Lady Sibell Lygon

In 1938 at the "Beau Geste" party, Lady Bridget Poulett wore pearls worth a million dollars ($22,872,340 in 2025 dollars), while her friend Margaret Whigham was showing off a fortune in diamonds and rubies.

In 1948 she married Luis Robledo, a Colombian diplomat, one of the founders of Independiente Santa Fe football club of Bogotá. They divorced later.

In 1950 Lady Bridget Poulett modelled for Pond's.

Since both the 8th Earl and his sister Lady Bridget Poulett were childless, in 1968 the 8th and last Earl Poulett sold the Hinton estate, after which he and his wife settled in Jersey, Channel Islands.

Lady Bridget died in 1978 in Bogotá.
