= Nancy Beaton =

English socialite

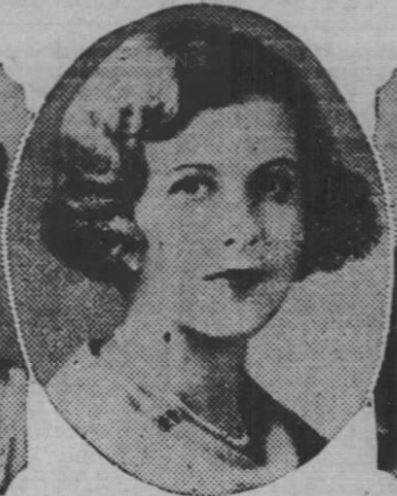
- Born: Nancy Elizabeth Louise Hardy Beaton; 30 September 1909; London, England
- Died: 6 June 1999 (aged 89)
- Occupation: Socialite
- Title: Lady Smiley
- Spouse: Sir Hugh Smiley, 3rd Baronet (m. 1933; died 1990)
- Parent(s): Ernest Walter Hardy Beaton; Esther "Etty" Sisson
- Relatives: Baba Beaton (sister); Cecil Beaton (brother)

Nancy Elizabeth Louise Hardy, Lady Smiley (née Beaton; 30 September 1909 – 6 June 1999) was an English socialite who, together with her sister, Baba Beaton, was known as one of the Beaton Sisters and was included in The Book of Beauty by their brother, Cecil Beaton.

== Biography ==
Nancy Beaton was born 30 September 1909, in London, the daughter of Ernest Walter Hardy Beaton (1867–1936), a timber merchant from Hampstead, and Esther "Etty" Sisson (1872–1962). Her paternal grandfather was Walter Hardy Beaton (1841–1904), founder of the family business "Beaton Brothers Timber Merchants and Agents". On 4 December 1909 she was baptized into the Church of England as Nancy Elizabeth Louise Hardy at St Mary's Church, Kilburn, with her parents recorded as Ernest Walter and Esther Beaton.

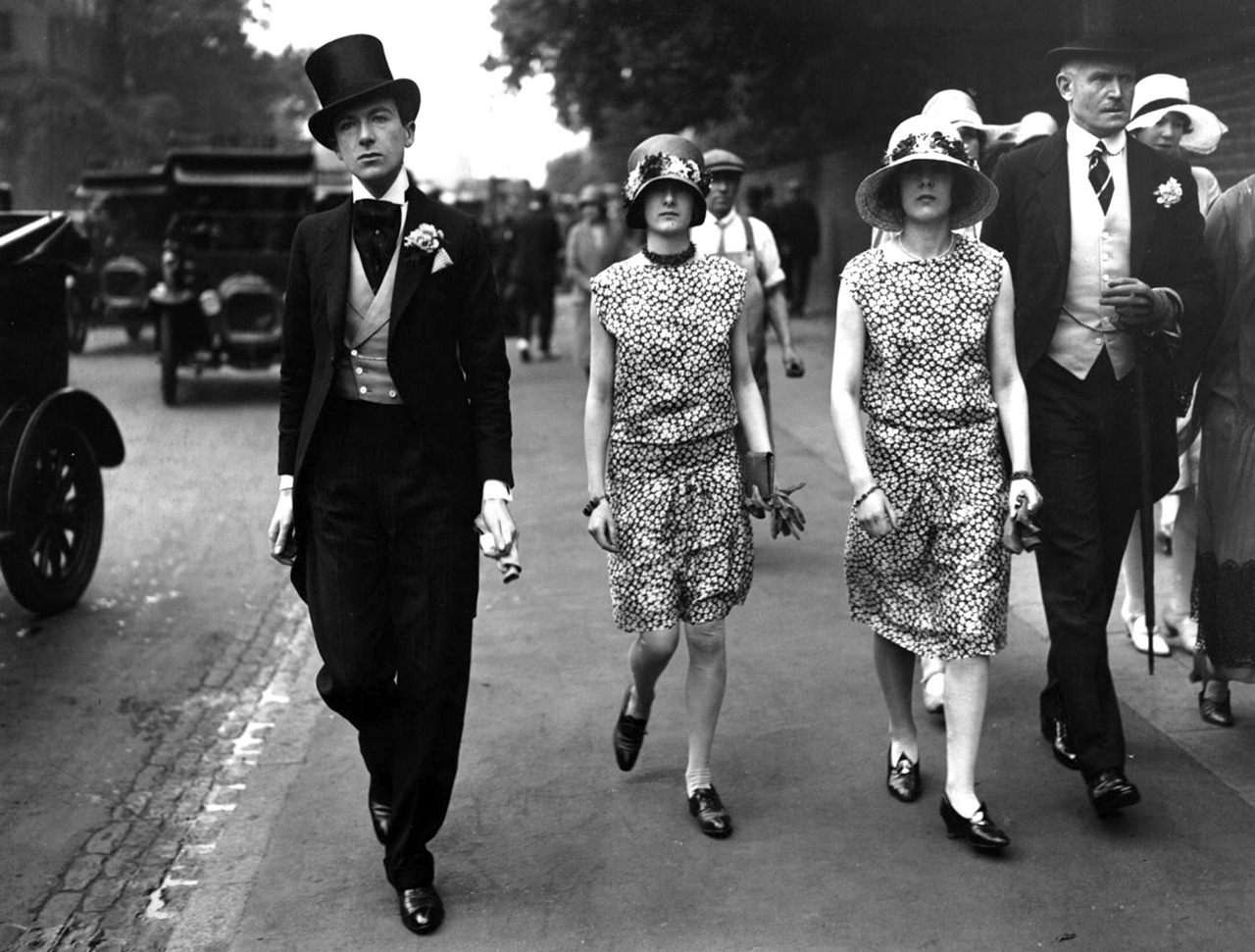
Cecil Beaton, and his sisters Nancy and Barbara, arriving at an Eton

Nancy was one of the first models of her brother Cecil.

Nancy Beaton was presented as a debutante at court in 1928, at the Queen Charlotte's Ball, in the presence of George V. She was part of a Bright Young Things' scandal when she, Stephen Tennant, and David Plunket Greene were thrown out from a party at the home of the Countess of Ellesmere they were crashing.

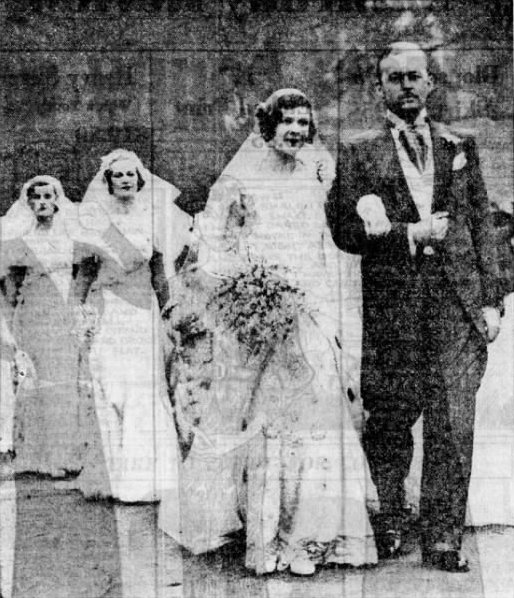

In January 1933 she married Sir Hugh Houston Smiley, 3rd Baronet (1905–1990). Constance Spry arranged the flowers and the wedding was a notable society event. The dresses were designed by her brother, Cecil Beaton. Baba Beaton, Margaret Whigham, Lady Bridget Poulett, and Lady Anne Wellesley were among the bridesmaids.

According to her brother Cecil Beaton in The Book of Beauty (1933): "I am enthralled at the childish intentness and gaiety of Nancy when looking for a coral tiara in a curiosity shop, by the complexion that emerges from underneath the water after she has fallen off an aquaplane board, by her dazzling blondness when, like a Gainsborough, writing her diary on a haystack."

She died on 6 June 1999.
