= Baba Beaton =

English socialite

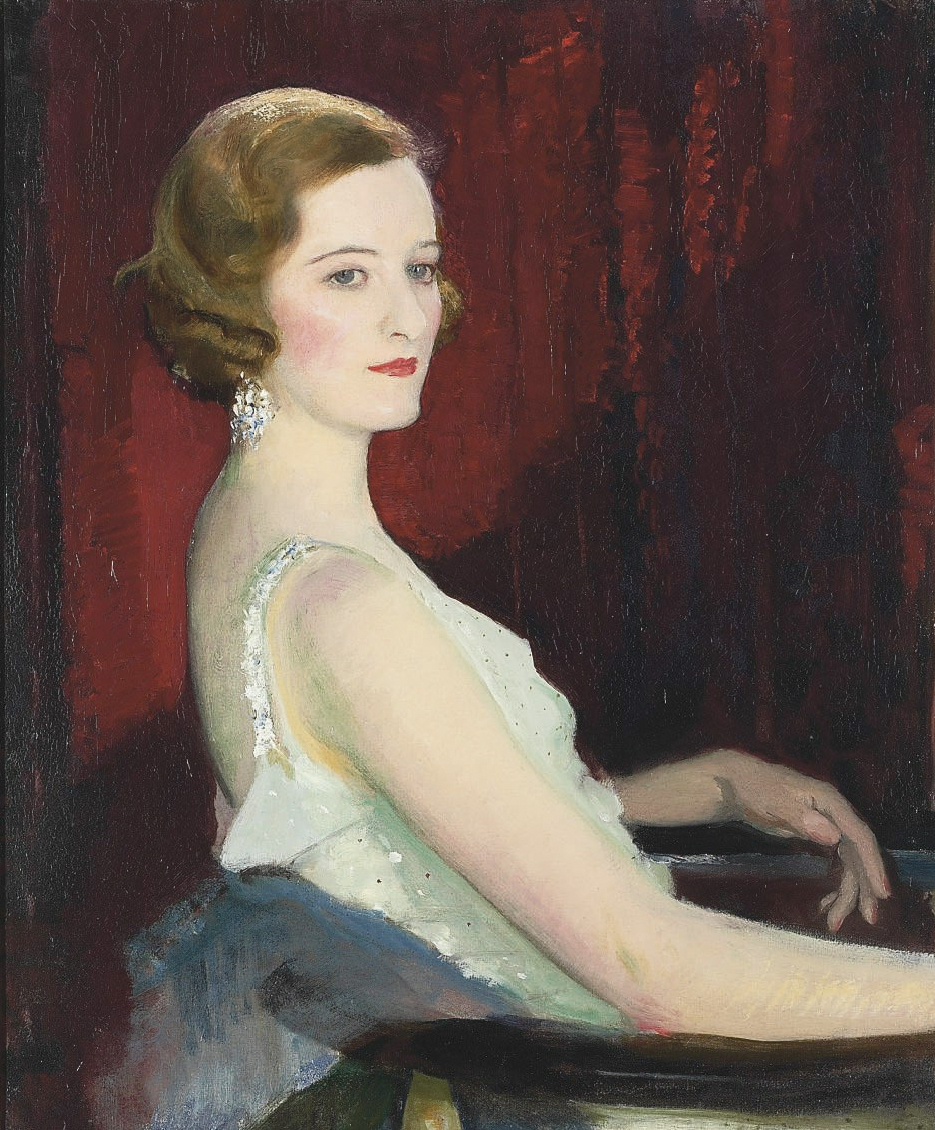
- George Spencer Watson (1869–1934) - Portrait of Miss Beaton
- Born: Barbara Jessica Hardy Beaton; 21 January 1912; London, England
- Died: 18 March 1973 (aged 61); Hawarden, Flintshire, Wales
- Occupation: Socialite
- Spouse: Alec Hambro (m. 1934; died 1943)
- Parent(s): Ernest Walter Hardy Beaton; Esther "Etty" Sisson
- Relatives: Nancy Beaton (sister); Cecil Beaton (brother)

Barbara Jessica Hardy Beaton (21 January 1912 – 18 March 1973), known as Baba Beaton, was an English socialite who, together with her sister, Nancy, was known as one of the Beaton Sisters, and was included in The Book of Beauty by their brother, Cecil Beaton.

== Biography ==
Barbara Jessica Hardy Beaton, nicknamed "Baba", was born on 21 January 1912, in London, the daughter of Ernest Walter Hardy Beaton (1867–1936), a timber merchant from Hampstead, and Esther "Etty" Sisson (1872–1962). Her paternal grandfather was Walter Hardy Beaton (1841–1904), founder of the family business "Beaton Brothers Timber Merchants and Agents".

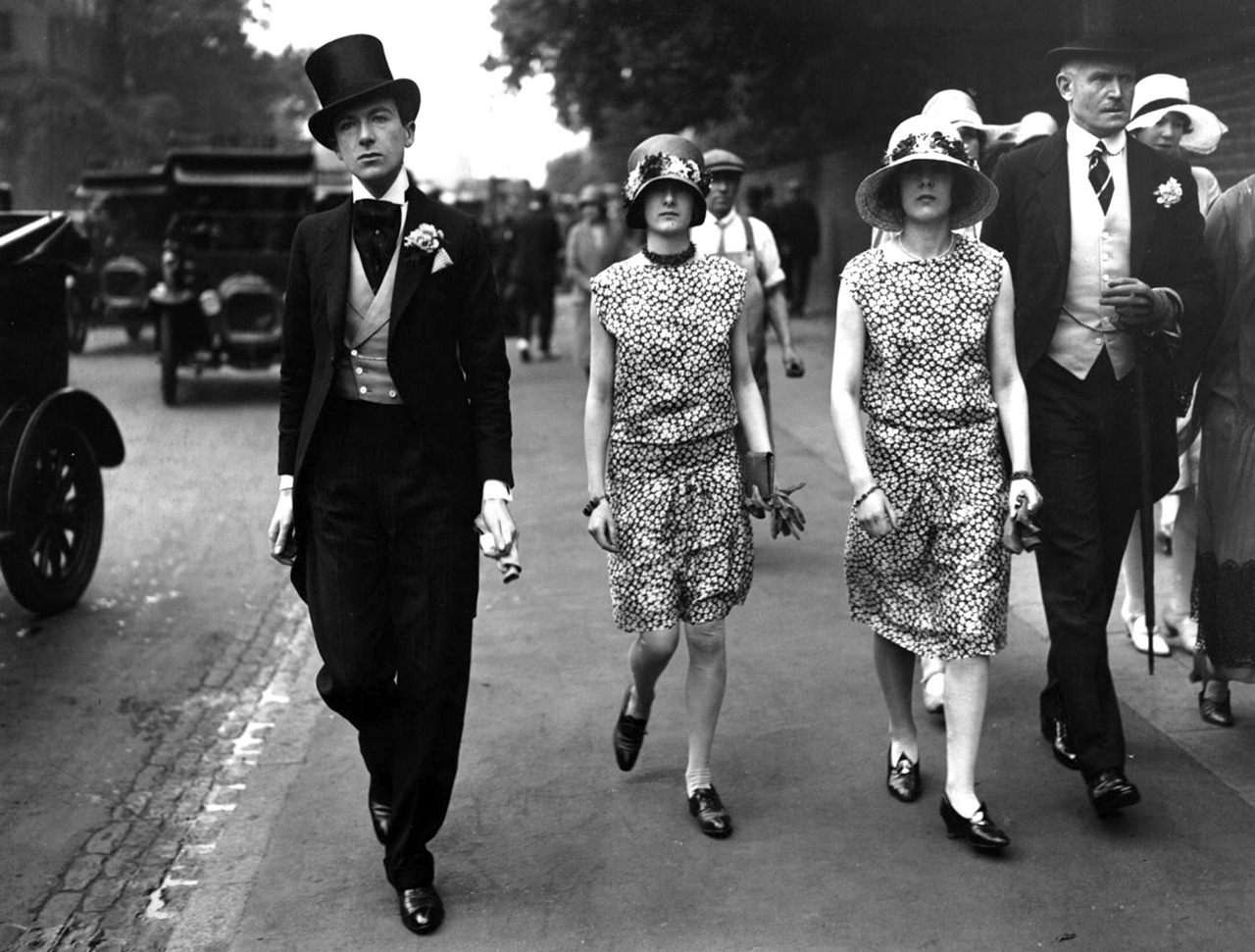
Cecil Beaton, and his sisters, Nancy and Barbara

Baba was one of the first models of her brother Cecil. A famous 1920 photo by Cecil Beaton depicts Baba Beaton, Wanda Baillie-Hamilton and Lady Bridget Poulett. According to her brother, Cecil Beaton, in The Book of Beauty (1930): "Baba is too wise to be young, and has the repose of archaic sculpture. She is like a Giotto painting with her classical features and limp spun hair like a mediaeval page’s, and though she is diminutively proportioned, with small, pointed breasts, her little figure is so elongated that, on her, materials fall in vertical folds like the flutings on a Grecian column. I did not know that anyone could look so liltingly lyrical in a bathing costume as she. I stare a lot, watching the varying lights of day and night upon them. I see new unsuspected qualities in Baba as she sits against the lamp or by the light of the fire."

In May 1930, Baba Beaton was presented at court as a debutante, dressed in an Empire cut mousseline de soie gown adorned with bands of opalescent paillettes. The other debutantes with her were: Eunice Bennett, Elizabeth Brinton Kent, and Frances Stotesbury Hutchinson. Always in May, she was at the famous Mozart Party held by David Tennant and his wife. Other guest included Lya de Putti, Gwen Ffrangcon-Davies, Olivia Wyndham, and Harry Melville.

In June 1932, Baba Beaton, together with Lady Bridget Poulett, Lady Patricia Moore, Jeanne Stourton, Molly Vaughan, Katherine Horlick, Margaret Livingstone-Learmonth, and Priscilla Weigall, considered among the most beautiful debutantes of 1932, were supposed to be the bridesmaids to the wedding of Miss Margaret Whigham to Charles Greville, 7th Earl of Warwick, but the engagement was broken in April. In the end, she was a bridesmaid when Whigham married Charles Francis Sweeny, an American golfer.

On 20 March 1933, she was a model for the 24th Birthday Celebrations and opening of the new building of Selfridge's; it was advertised as a Fashion Premiere presented by Society Beauties.

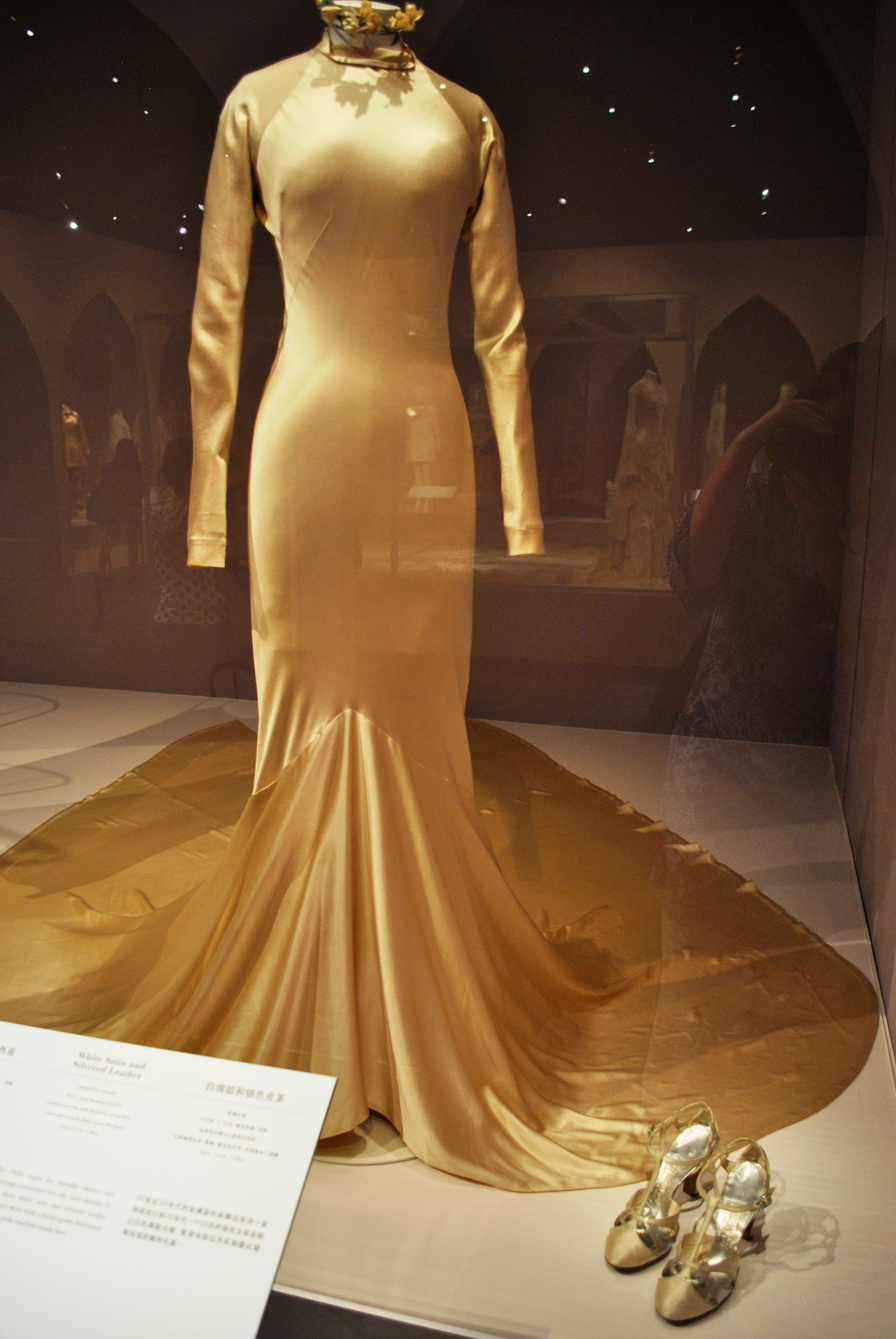
Wedding dress with orange-blossom choker, 1934, for Baba Beaton. V&A Museum

On 6 November 1934, she married Major Alec Hambro (7 July 1910 - 8 August 1943), the son of Angus Valdimar Hambro, M.P. for North Dorset Divn., and Rosamund Maud Kearsley, of Blandford, Dorsetshire. Baba Beaton's wedding dress was designed by Charles James, a very modern interpretation of the white wedding dress, with a raised neckline and divided train. Baba and Alec had two daughters, Alexandra, born 5 August 1935 (now Mrs Michael Lamb), and Rosamund, born 27 September 1939 (now Lady Gladstone), married Sir William Gladstone, 7th Baronet. In 1934, George Spencer Watson painted her portrait, titled: "Baba" Beaton, Mrs. Alec Hambro.

Alec Hambro was killed in action during World War II, while serving with the Reconnaissance Corps. He is buried in Tripoli War Cemetery, and a memorial is at Milton Abbey in Dorset. Baba Beaton died on 18 March 1973 in Hawarden, Flintshire, Wales.
