= Vivex =

Vivex was an early colour photography process invented by the research chemist Dr. Douglas Arthur Spencer (1901 - 1979) and first used in 1931. It was produced by the British company Colour Photographs (British and Foreign) Ltd of Willesden, which operated the first professional colour printing service. The company was in business from 1928 until the start of World War II in 1939. Up until the war, the Vivex process accounted for 90% of UK colour print photography.

Vivex was a wash-off relief process using three negatives, one for each primary colour. It was a subtractive process, using cyan, magenta, and yellow primaries. The three negative plates could be exposed in sequence using a special automated camera back (designed for plate cameras) or simultaneously via the company's own VIVEX Tri-Colour Camera. After processing, the three negatives were printed as bromide prints, these were bleached and used to produce Carbro images on cellophane. These were then assembled by hand, the cellophane being stripped away once each layer was aligned, to obtain the final print.

With other assembly processes of this type, where the image was built up from three exposures, getting the image in register was difficult. The cellophane supports did however allow the individual layers to be stretched somewhat, making the assembly easier. It also created the possibility of all manner of colour manipulation. A noted proponent of the Vivex process was Yevonde Middleton, who made use of Vivex's creative possibilities and whose work helped overcome public scepticism about the merits of colour photography.

== See also ==
A short history of colour photography (National Science and Media Museum blog)
