= Edgar Middleton =

British playwright and author (1894–1939)

- Born: 26 November 1894
- Died: 10 April 1939 (aged 44); London
- Occupations: Playwright; author
- Spouse: Yevonde Cumbers (m. 1920)

Edgar Charles William Middleton (26 November 1894 – 10 April 1939) was a British playwright and author.

== Biography ==
He was educated at Bancroft's School, Woodford, Essex, then worked for the Eastern Telegraph Company in Cape Town as a cable operator.

=== Military service ===
When war broke out in 1914 he resigned his post and returned to UK, taking up a commission in the 12th Essex Regiment as temporary Second Lieutenant on 11 November 1914. He relinquished his commission on 5 May 1915 to transfer into the Royal Naval Air Service (RNAS), where he was given a probationary commission as Flight Sub-Lieutenant. He trained and qualified in ballooning at Roehampton and observed the second bombardment of Ypres from an observation balloon. However, he became ill when in Dunkirk and suffered a "serious mental breakdown". He received a letter from the Admiralty, dated 15 December 1915, stating that he had been found unsuitable for the Air Service and terminating his appointment.

=== Journalist ===
He then tried to get work as a journalist and wrote articles for the Daily Mail under the name "Air Pilot", and it was in this capacity that an unfortunate incident occurred which led to him being arrested and tried under the Defence of the Realm Act. On 12 April 1916, Middleton visited Dover and met up with former colleagues in the RNAS, telling them, "I have come to Dover to do a bit of spying for Pemberton Billing". He asked whether officers still lived about two miles from the aerodrome and had to travel there each meal time. He was arrested and appeared at Dover magistrates court on 20 April where, despite pleading not guilty, he was committed for trial at Kent Assizes, charged with "unlawfully attempting to elicit information with respect to the movements or disposition of His Majesty's forces (to wit, the Royal Naval Air Service) such as might be of value to the enemy." He was released on bail. At his trial in Maidstone on 22 June he pleaded guilty, and the Lord Chief Justice dealt leniently with him on the basis that he was trying to work for the improvement of the Air Service, and he had no evil motive and was loyal to his country. He was bound over in the sum of £25.

Middleton continued as a journalist, but also turned his hand to writing books, drawing upon his experiences in the Air Service to produce Aircraft (1916), The Way of the Air: A Description of Modern Aviation (1917), Glorious exploits of the air (1917), Airfare of to-day and of the future (1918), Tails Up (1918), and The Kingdom of the Air (1919), culminating in The Great War in the Air, a history of the air in the war in four volumes with an introduction by Lord Montagu of Beaulieu which was released in 1920.

=== Marriage ===
In 1920 he married Yevonde Philone Cumbers (1893–1975), who in 1914 had set up her own studio as Madame Yevonde – Portrait Photographer. During their courtship she offered to relinquish her career for him, but he considered that would be a mistake, to her relief. She was upset on their honeymoon when he told her that he could not bear the thought of children, since she regarded marriage as pointless without children. Nevertheless, she concentrated her efforts instead on her career and went on to become a remarkable pioneer in colour photography in the 1930s.

Middleton's journalistic career continued, with appointments including aeronautical editor of the London Daily Mail, London Correspondent for the New York Sun and correspondent for the Calgary Herald in their new London office. He also contributed to the Daily Express, Daily Mirror, Evening Standard, Evening News, Sunday Times, Sunday Express, Sunday Dispatch, Sunday Pictorial, Woman's Journal, Woman's Pictorial and other publications. In 1921, he and his wife were two of the 43 Foundation Members who attended the inauguration of PEN International, an organisation which celebrates literature and promotes freedom of expression and which now has over 20,000 members in more than 100 countries.

=== Playwright ===
Middleton is, however, primarily famed for his writing for the stage, particularly his first play, the comedy Potiphar's Wife, which was first staged in London in 1927 and was described by the Evening Standard as the "Play that shocks London". Performances followed as far afield as Paris, and New York and Middleton is reputed to have made eighty thousand pounds from the play. The plot is derived from the Biblical story in Genesis 39 in which Joseph rejects attempts by his master's wife to seduce him, and she retaliates by accusing him of attempted rape. However, unlike the original, Middleton's play ends in court with the exoneration of the virtuous chauffeur and with Lady Aylesbrough exposed as a shameful perjurer. The play opened at the Globe Theatre in London in August 1927 with Jeanne de Casalis as Lady Aylesbrough and Paul Cavanagh as the accused chauffeur, and one scene caused something of a stir when she appeared on stage in pyjamas. The play was also staged at the Savoy Theatre. The novel of the play was published the following year, advertised as "The best novel on the market. The story of the Play that shocked the critics".

In 1928 Middleton followed this with a "melodramatic satire" called Tin Gods, produced at the Garrick Theatre in London in February 1928. His next work, Morning, Noon, and Night, a revue, which included additional scenes by Harold Scott and William Pollock, was staged in the Everyman Theatre in May 1929, but only after three sketches from the revue had been censored by the Lord Chamberlain, who refused to license Mussolini's Lunch, Returned With Thanks and Force of Habit for the stage. Middleton responded by publishing them in a book entitled Banned By the Censor: The Eclectic Library, released later in 1929.

=== Parliamentary candidate ===
In 1929 Middleton took a foray into politics, which he described as a hobby. In the 1929 General Election he stood as candidate for the Liberal party in the Islington East constituency in London and adopted a novel method of canvassing support by using the telephone to contact electors. Both the other candidates got more votes than he did, but his support exceeded that of any previous Liberal candidate in this constituency.

=== The 1930s ===
In the years that followed, he continued to write, and was also secretary to the Daily Mail Trust. He wrote biographies of the Prince of Wales in 1933, and of Lord Beaverbrook in 1934, and then in 1934 he published his autobiography entitled, I might have been a success.

His next major play was England Expects..., featuring the life of Nelson and his romantic relationship with Emma Hamilton. The play was first produced at the Embassy Theatre in April 1936, with Walter Hudd as Nelson and Margaretta Scott as Lady Hamilton. Following this, in 1938 he wrote a "crooked comedy", titled Lady with Designs, written with Frank Gregory, which was staged in the Ambassadors Theatre to unenthusiastic reviews.

He was also involved with the production of several films (known as "talking pictures") of Potiphar's Wife (1929), Tin Gods (1932), Captivation (1931), and the Official film of the life of The Prince of Wales (1933).

He lived at 3, Dr Johnson's Buildings, Inner Temple, London EC4. He died of cancer at the age of 44 in a London nursing home on 10 April 1939 after a short illness. At the time of his death he was collaborating in the production of a film biography of Queen Mary. His wife, who adored him, was devastated by his death. However, in his autobiography Middleton never mentions his marriage, but does include chapters with the titles Women aren't wonderful and Why I hate women.

However, despite sometimes being described as a misogynist, in 1935 it was said of him: "Airman, author, journalist, playwright, politician, royal biographer, Edgar Middleton has possibly led a more varied career than any other man of his age."

== List of works ==
=== Books ===
- 1916: Aircraft. George Newnes Limited. 1916.
- 1917: The Way of the Air: A Description of Modern Aviation. Frederick A. Stokes Company. 1917.
- 1917: Glorious Exploits of the Air. D. Appleton. 1917. ISBN 9781246578645.
- 1918: Airfare of Today And of the Future. Constable. 1918. ISBN 9780548509463.
- 1918: Tails Up. Simpkin, Marshall, Hamilton, Kent. 1918. ISBN 9781245168496.
- 1919: The Kingdom of the Air. E. J. Burrow & Company, Limited. 1919.
- 1920: The Great War in the Air. Waverley Book Company. 1920.
- 1928: Potiphar's wife. 1928.
- 1928: Potiphar's Wife. The Novel of the Play. London. 1928.
- 1929: Banned by the censor. T. W. Laurie. 1929.
- 1933: H.R.H., A Pictorial Biography; Edited by Edgar Middleton. 1933.
- 1934: Beaverbrook: The Statesman and the Man. Stanley Paul. 1934.
- 1934: I Might Have Been a Success. Stanley Paul. 1934.
- 1939: The Men who are Shaping the Future. The Scientific Book Club. 1939. Published posthumously

=== Plays ===
- 1926: One-act sketches: Habit, The Night Out
- 1927: Potiphar's Wife
- 1928: Tin Gods
- 1929: Morning, Noon and Night (revue)
- 1936: England Expects—?
- 1938: Lady with Designs (with Frank Gregory)

=== Films ===
- 1929: Potiphar's Wife
- 1931: Captivation
- 1932: Tin Gods
- 1933: Official film of the life of The Prince of Wales
