= Dorothy Bartlam =

English actress (1907–1991)

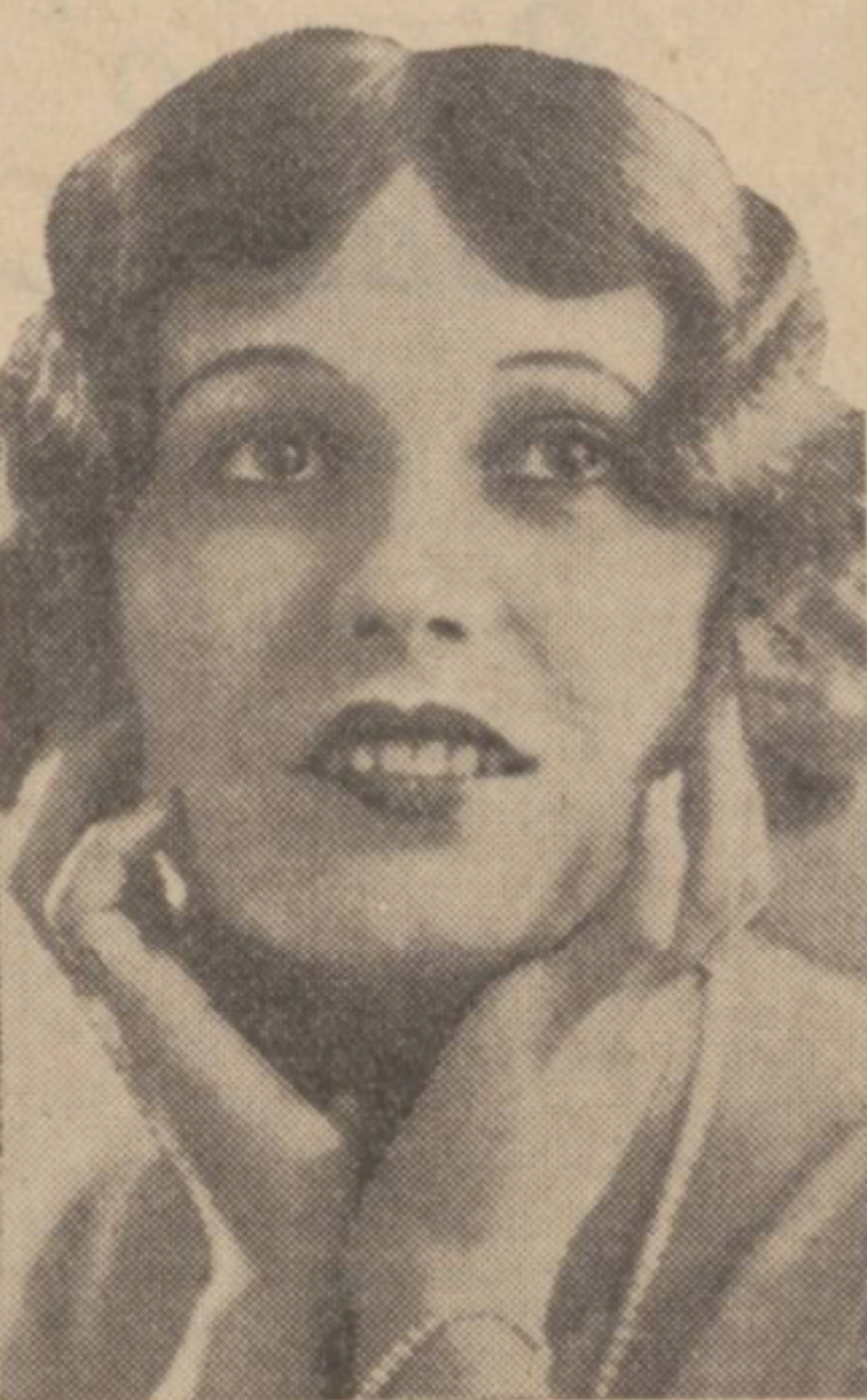
- Bartlam circa 1928
- Born: Dorothy Ezard Bartlam; 8 November 1907; Goole
- Died: September 1991 (aged 83); Bournemouth

Dorothy Ezard Bartlam (8 November 1907 in Goole, Yorkshire – September 1991 in Bournemouth, Hampshire) was an English actress and novelist.

== Early life ==
Bartlam was born in Goole, East Riding of Yorkshire to father Charles Ruby Bartlam, an ironmonger, and mother Henrietta (née Ezard).

== Personal life ==
Bartlam was married to art director David Rawnsley from 1933 until their divorce in 1936.

== Bibliography ==
- Contrary Wise (1931)

== Filmography ==
- A Woman Redeemed (1927)
- The Fake (1927)
- A Little Bit of Fluff (1928)
- Not Quite a Lady (1928)
- Afterwards (1928)
- The Flying Squad (1929)
- The Ringer (1931)
- Fascination (1931)
- Stranglehold (1931)
- Tin Gods (1931)
- The Love Race (1931)
- Her Night Out (1932)
- Watch Beverly (1932)
- Fires of Fate (1932)
- On Thin Ice (1933)
- The Fear Ship (1933)
- The Jewel (1933)
- Up for the Derby (1933)
- Call Me Mame (1933)
