= Tin Gods (1932 film) =

1932 film

- Frank Royde, Dorothy Bartlam, Evan Thomas, Ben Weldon and Ruth Maitland in the film.
- Directed by: F.W. Kraemer
- Written by: Edgar C. Middleton
- Produced by: F.W. Kraemer
- Starring: Frank Cellier; Dorothy Bartlam; Evan Thomas
- Production company: British International Pictures
- Distributed by: Pathé Pictures
- Release date: 25 July 1932
- Running time: 52 minutes
- Country: United Kingdom
- Language: English

Tin Gods is a 1932 British drama film directed by F.W. Kraemer and starring Frank Cellier, Dorothy Bartlam and Evan Thomas. It was written by Edgar C. Middleton based on his 1928 play of the same title, and made at Welwyn Studios as a quota quickie by British International Pictures.

== Plot ==
An American sausage magnate and his wife, a missionary, a Vice Consul with his family, and a young drunkard are the passengers on a steam ship sailing on the China Sea. They are kidnapped and held to ransom by a pirate, the evil Cheng Chi Lung, and after being taunted by him, are rescued by marines.

== Cast ==
- Frank Cellier as Major Drake
- Dorothy Bartlam as Daphne Drake
- Evan Thomas as Robert Staveley
- Frank Royde as Cheng Chi Lung
- Ben Welden as Cyrus P. Schroeder
- Alexander Field as Lane
- Margaret Damer as Mrs. Drake
- Ruth Maitland as Mrs Schroeder
- Atholl Fleming as padre
- Hal Gordon

== Reception ==
Film Weekly wrote: "A good idea has gone wrong in Tin Gods, through feeble direction and half-hearted acting. ... This might have been very effective if the director had developed his theme resourcefully, or if the cast had made their parts live. But the treatment is painfully weak and obvious."

Kine Weekly wrote: "A drama of the Orient, a lesson in social snobbery, which is so poorly acted and treated with such little imagination that its point and purpose are lost and it is always in danger of sinking to bathos. ... The idea of segregating a number of people, all of whom are snobs in their own particular way, and testing their clams to social eminence by following their reactions to imminent danger, is a good one, but the fine dramatic possibilities offered my the original theme are dissipated by the producer and players, and the proceedings peter out, destitute of all drama."

Picture Show wrote: "Slow moving melodrama, a trifle obscure in its development ... Too much unnecessary dialogue, and not very convincing settings. Excellent acting."
