= On Thin Ice (1933 film) =

- Directed by: Bernard Vorhaus
- Written by: Bernard Vorhaus
- Produced by: Bernard Vorhaus
- Starring: Ursula Jeans; Kenneth Law; Dorothy Bartlam
- Cinematography: Eric Cross
- Production company: Hall Mark Productions
- Distributed by: Equity British Films
- Release date: February 1933
- Running time: 62 minutes
- Country: United Kingdom
- Language: English

On Thin Ice is a 1933 British crime film directed, written and produced by Bernard Vorhaus and starring Ursula Jeans, Kenneth Law and Dorothy Bartlam. It was produced as a quota quickie.

== Preservation status ==
In 1992 the British Film Institute classed On Thin Ice as a lost film. Subsequently its National Archive obtained 183 feet of silent 35mm print labelled "On Thin Ice (extracts)". The archive contains no ephemera or stills.

== Synopsis ==
Harry Newman is engaged to Lady Violet. Corry, jealous of Newman, pays nightclub singer Mabel to flirt with Newman and blackmail his father over letters she claims to have written to his son.

== Cast ==
- Ursula Jeans as Lady Violet
- Kenneth Law as Harry Newman
- Dorothy Bartlam as unidentified role
- Viola Gault as Mabel
- Stewart Thompson as Corry
- Cameron Carr as Mr Newman

== Reception ==
Kine Weekly wrote: "So competent a stage actress as Ursula Jeans is ill-served by a production which does not add to the prestige of British pictures. The plot, which attempts a portrayal of Society life, is thin, while the treatment is not sufficient to win approval from any but an uncritical audience."

The Daily Film Renter wrote: "Poor story, crudely directed; suffering from over-acting and incredible confusion of sequence. British picture that does not stand up to criticism, but may possibly get by in small halls with the most indulgent audiences. The story in this film is its principal weakness. Frankly, it does not bear reiteration. The picture opens with a garden party, in which the hero takes his lady upon a lake which might well be as big as Windermere, a sequence which has all the aspects of an interesting film, but does not help the story. The cabaret show later is similarly indifferent, and the sequences which follow are likely to be greeted with ridicule by any average audience. Yesterday, the sophisticated trade show audience howled with laughter at the banalities of supposedly dramatic situations. There is quite a good cast, including Ursula Jeans, Dorothy Bartlam, and others, but it is too much to expect players, whatever their ability, to cope with such a weak and pitiful narrative. A subject which will not add to the prestige of British films, and is unlikely to be accepted anywhere but in the very small halls, and by the most indulgent patrons."
