= Captivation =

1931 British film by John Harvel

- Betty Stockfeld, Violet Vanbrugh and Conway Tearle in the film.
- Directed by: John Harvel
- Written by: Edgar C. Middleton
- Produced by: John Harvel
- Starring: Conway Tearle; Betty Stockfeld; Violet Vanbrugh
- Cinematography: James E. Rogers
- Edited by: Stewart B. Moss
- Music by: William Trytel
- Production company: John Harvel Productions
- Distributed by: Woolf and Freedman Film Service
- Release date: 19 May 1931
- Running time: 68 minutes
- Country: United Kingdom
- Language: English

Captivation is a 1931 British romantic comedy film directed by John Harvel and starring Conway Tearle, Betty Stockfeld and Violet Vanbrugh. It was written by Edgar C. Middleton, and made as a quota quickie at Beaconsfield Studios near London.

== Preservation status ==
The British Film Institute National Archive holds a collection of stills but no film or video materials.

== Synopsis ==
On the French Riviera, a young woman attempts to attract a famous novelist.

== Cast ==
- Conway Tearle as Hugh Somerton
- Betty Stockfeld as Ann Moore
- Violet Vanbrugh as Lady Froster
- Marilyn Mawn as Muriel Froster
- A. Bromley Davenport as Colonel Jordan
- Louise Tinsley as Fluffy
- Frederick Volpe as Skipper
- George De Warfaz as clerk
- Dorothy Black as adventuress

== Reception ==
Film Weekly wrote: "It is fortunate that Captivation has striking settings and capable acting to its credit, for it has little else to entertain you."

Kine Weekly wrote: "A popular type of romantic drama, which rings the changes effectively on a familiar theme, and is treated with a lightness of touch which results in a number of piquant situations. The production qualities are satisfactory, the leading players make the most of their roles, and the dialogue is quite well written. Development is a trifle slow, but the story gathers momentum in the second halt, and ends on a happy note."
