= Frank Ormond Soden =

Frank Soden
- Born: 3 November 1895; Petitcodiac, New Brunswick, Canada
- Died: 12 February 1961 (aged 65); London, England
- Military career
- Allegiance: United Kingdom
- Branch: British Army; Royal Air Force
- Rank: Group Captain
- Nickname: Mongoose
- Units: Royal Flying Corps: No. 41 Squadron; No. 60 Squadron
- Conflicts: First World War; Second World War
- Awards: Distinguished Flying Cross & Bar

Frank Ormond "Mongoose" Soden DFC & Bar (3 November 1895 – 12 February 1961) was a First World War flying ace and RAF commander during the Second World War.

He served initially in the British Army as an infantry officer, before joining the Royal Flying Corps and transferring to the Royal Air Force on its creation. He remained in the RAF following the war, and went on to serve in Iraq and also as an RAF Station commander during the Second World War.

== Early life and World War I service ==
Soden was born in Petitcodiac, New Brunswick, Canada, but emigrated to England as a child in 1904. He was educated at Woodbridge School.

His career in the armed forces began with the Inns of Court Regiment Officer Training Corps, from which he was commissioned into the South Staffordshire Regiment as second lieutenant in 1914. He first entered a theatre of war on 14 July 1915. He was first attached to the Royal Flying Corps in 1916, and officially transferred on 27 April 1917.

His career as a fighter ace began in No. 60 Squadron RFC, when flying a Nieuport 17 to claim an Albatros D.III down 'out of control' on 25 June 1917. Beginning with his third victory on 17 September 1917, he was flying the new Royal Aircraft Factory SE.5a. He was not credited with the destruction of an enemy aircraft until his fourth claim, on 20 September. He became an ace with the first of two victories the morning of 21 September 1917, sending down an Albatros DV out of control. In the afternoon, he was credited with the destruction of a second enemy craft, shared with two other 60 Squadron pilots. He was given command of a flight on 5 December 1917, and given temporary promotion to captain.

He accumulated victories at a steady pace, downing from one to four Germans per month through February 1918.

He achieved his most notable victory on 9 January 1918, over Max, Ritter von Müller. Müller, whose victory tally was 36, had downed no fewer than five British aces. Accompanied by Captain Robert Chidlaw-Roberts, Soden set Müller's Albatros D.V on fire in the air near Moorslede, Belgium. Müller exited the flaming biplane and fell to his death.

On 5 February, Soden scored a double, bringing his total to 16. On 8 August he was a flight commander with No 41 Squadron, still flying the S.E.5a. He sent a Fokker D.VII down in flames, and scored twice more in August. On 15 September, he singlehandedly shot down an observation balloon for his 20th kill.

October 1918 was his most productive month. On the 8th he destroyed a DFW C. two-seater, and on the 10th a Fokker D.VII. On the 14th, he destroyed two more D.VIIs. On the 25th, he shot down a balloon. On the 28th, he was responsible for the capture of a Fokker D.VII near Ooteghem, Belgium. His 27th and final victory came three days later, when he drove down another D.VII out of control.

Soden's final tally included 13 German aircraft put down 'out of control', 11 destroyed, 2 observation balloons destroyed single-handed, and a Fokker D.VII captured. At least 19 of his victories were over German fighters. Nine of his victories were shared with other pilots from his squadron.

He was awarded the Distinguished Flying Cross on 8 February 1919, the citation read:

Capt. Frank Ormond Soden. (FRANCE) A bold and skilful officer who has accounted for three enemy aeroplanes and two balloons during recent operations.

The main part of the war over, in 1919 Soden volunteered to join the British expedition to Murmansk, part of Allied efforts to support White Russian forces.

== Post World War I life ==
Soden remained in the Royal Air Force after the war (he had been granted a regular commission as a captain on 1 August 1919). His first role was in the Waziristan Campaign. He then joined RAF Iraq Command, serving in Kurdistan (northern Iraq). For his services there he was awarded a Bar to his DFC on 19 December 1922, he now held the rank of flight lieutenant.

Soden was promoted squadron leader on 12 December 1928, he then took command of No. 111 (Fighter) Squadron at RAF Hornchurch. In 1929 he was sent to the British Mandate of Palestine to command No. 14 (Bomber) Squadron and subsequently served on the staff at the RAF headquarters in Jerusalem. He returned to the UK in 1934 to take command of No. 65 Squadron which reformed on 1 August at RAF Hornchurch. He was promoted wing commander on 1 July 1935, and group captain on 1 April 1939. During this period he had also commanded No. 7 (Bomber) Squadron and No. 3 Armament Training Camp at RAF Sutton Bridge.

During the Second World War, he was initially station commander at RAF Upper Heyford before taking command of one of RAF Fighter Command's most important airfields, RAF Biggin Hill. He served in this command from December 1940 to June 1941. He later served in the Middle East, as airfield commander at RAF Castel Benito, and commanding Operational Training Units.

Soden retired from the RAF on 21 May 1945, married Wanda Holden and emigrated to Kenya. There, in 1953, during the Mau Mau Uprising he saw off an attempt by 20 armed Mau Mau to raid his house near Timau. He was later involved in trying to evacuate refugees from Congo in light aircraft, and was held by Congolese forces for a while.

He died in hospital in London, on 12 February 1961. A memorial service was held at St Clement Danes, the RAF church, on 15 March 1961.
