= Watch Beverly =

1932 film

- Francis X. Bushman in the film.
- Directed by: Arthur Maude
- Written by: Cyril Campion (play); N. W. Baring-Pemberton; John Cousins
- Produced by: Ivar Campbell
- Starring: Henry Kendall; Dorothy Bartlam; Francis X. Bushman
- Cinematography: George Stretton
- Production company: Sound City Films
- Distributed by: Butcher's Film Service
- Release date: 21 October 1932
- Running time: 80 minutes
- Country: United Kingdom
- Language: English

Watch Beverley is a 1932 British comedy film directed by Arthur Maude and starring Henry Kendall, Dorothy Bartlam and Francis X. Bushman. It was written by N. W. Baring-Pemberton and John Cousins, adapted from the play by Cyril Campion, and was shot at Shepperton Studios outside London.

== Preservation status ==
The British Film Institute National Archive holds a collection of ephemera and stills but no film or video materials.

== Premise ==
A British diplomat becomes entangled with a ring of international criminals.

== Cast ==
- Henry Kendall as Victor Beverly
- Dorothy Bartlam as Audrey Thurloe
- Francis X. Bushman as President Orloff
- Frederic de Lara as Rachmann
- Charles Mortimer as Sir James Briden
- Patrick Ludlow as Patrick Nolan
- Colin Pole as George
- Anthony Holles as Arthur Briden
- Aileen Pitt Marsden as Anne Markham

== Reception ==
Film Weekly wrote: "Light-hearted but rather stagey farce on the old impersonation theme, carried along fairly well by the ebullience and slick touch of Henry Kendall in the principal part. ... Kendall's performance is the main excuse for the picture, and he is especially amusing when he poses as the outlandish politician; clad in beard, and weird accent. He is moderately well supported by Dorothy Bartlam and Anthony Holles, but the other members of the cast are poor, a fact which serves to accentuate the frailties of the plot."

Kine Weekly wrote: "Although the fun, and particularly the dialogue, does not always hit the target, situations are amusing enough to afford a useful quota inclusion for any hall."
