= Wanda Holden =

English socialite

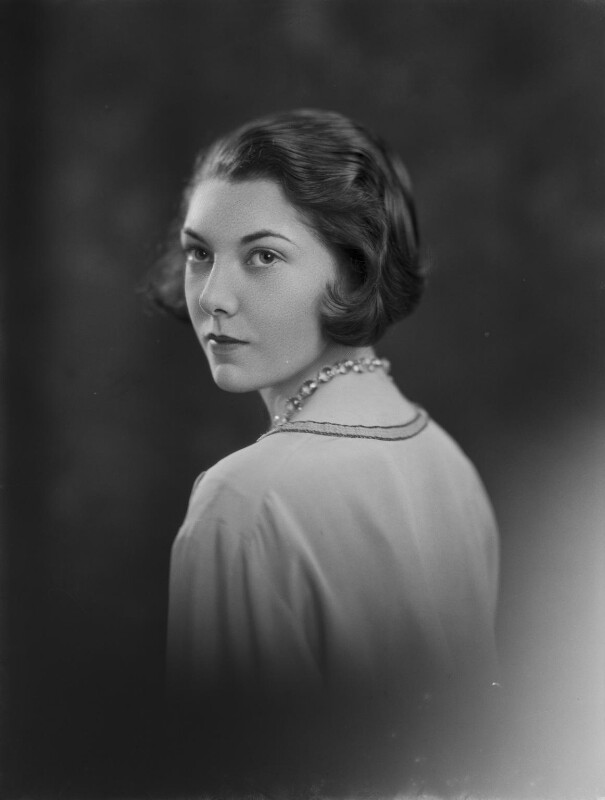
Wanda Holden, by Lafayette, 1929

Wanda Holden (c. 1911 – 30 October 1956) was an English socialite, included in The Book of Beauty by Cecil Beaton.

== Biography ==
She was born circa 1911 to parents Emily Marion Holden and financier Major Norman Holden OBE, son of the Liberal politician Sir Edward Holden.

On 17 July 1929 Wanda Holden married Charles Baillie-Hamilton. She was described in the press as "one of the most admired débutantes of the last season, with a vivacious personality", and "one of the most popular figures in society". From 1929 to 1931 her husband held the office of Member of Parliament (MP) for Bath. They were divorced in November 1932 in an uncontested claim of her adultery with the actor John Loder.

In 1933 she was included in The Book of Beauty by Cecil Beaton, who described her as "a wild-eyed bacchante".

On 6 November 1936 she married Frank Ormond Soden and moved to Kenya. She died on 30 October 1956, at Chateau Shauri, Timau, near Nanyuki, Kenya, and is buried at Nanyuki War Cemetery, Kenya.
