= Yevonde Middleton =

English photographer (1893–1975)

- Self portrait
- Born: Yevonde Philone Cumbers; 5 January 1893; Streatham, London, England
- Died: 22 December 1975 (aged 82); London, England
- Known for: Photography
- Spouse: Edgar Middleton (m. 1920; died 1939)

Yevonde Philone Middleton (née Cumbers; 5 January 1893 – 22 December 1975) was an English photographer, who pioneered the use of colour in portrait photography. She used the professional name Madame Yevonde or simply Yevonde in a career lasting over 60 years. During the interwar period, she was amongst a group of photographers that "brought a new vitality to British photography".

== Early life ==
Yevonde Philone Cumbers was born on 5 January 1893 in Streatham. She was the elder of two daughters; her younger sister was Verena. The family moved to Bromley in 1899. She was initially educated by a governess and a local day school, then at the liberal and progressive Lingholt Boarding School in Hindhead and subsequently at the Guilde Internationale in Paris, as well as boarding schools in Belgium and France. From an early age Yevonde Cumbers displayed an independent attitude. Her heroine was women's liberationist Mary Wollstonecraft, and she joined the Suffragette movement in 1910.

On leaving school, she returned to the family home in Bromley, Kent, and became active in suffragette activities, but realised that she was not cut out to be a leader in the field of women's rights. Cumbers eventually ceased her active involvement, but not before answering an advertisement she had seen in The Suffragette for a photographer's apprentice. She attended an interview with Lena Connell, who took austere photographs of nobility and suffragette leaders.

Instead, Cumbers sought, and was given, a three-year apprenticeship with the portrait photographer Lallie Charles. In 1914, with the technical grounding she received from working with Charles, and a gift of £250 from her father, at the age of 21 Yevonde set up her own studio at 92 Victoria Street, London, and began to make a name for herself by inviting well-known figures to sit for free. Before long her pictures were appearing in society magazines such as the Tatler and The Sketch. Her style quickly moved away from the stiff "pouter pigeon" look of Lallie Charles, toward a still formal, but more creative, style. Her subjects were often pictured looking away from the camera, and she began using props to creative effect.

By 1921, Madame Yevonde had become a well-known and respected portrait photographer, and moved to larger premises at 100 Victoria Street. Here she began taking advertising commissions and also photographed many of the leading personalities of the day, including A.A. Milne, Barbara Cartland, Diana Mitford, Louis Mountbatten and Noël Coward.

== Career ==
In the early 1930s, Yevonde began experimenting with colour photography, using the new Vivex colour process from Colour Photography Limited of Willesden. The introduction of colour photography was not universally popular; indeed photographers and the public alike were so used to black-and-white pictures that early reactions to the new process tended toward the hostile. Yevonde, however, was hugely enthusiastic about it and spent countless hours in her studio experimenting with how to get the best results. Her dedication paid huge dividends. In 1932 she put on an exhibition of portrait work at the Albany Gallery, half monochrome and half colour, to enthusiastic reviews.

In an address to the Royal Photographic Society in 1932, Yevonde argued that women were more strongly suited to embrace colour photography, because colour was more important to women's lives.

In 1933, Madame Yevonde moved once again, this time to 28 Berkeley Square. She began using colour in her advertising work as well as her portraits, and took on other commissions too. In 1936, she was commissioned by Fortune magazine to photograph the last stages in the fitting out of the new Cunard liner, the Queen Mary. This was very different from Yevonde's usual work, but the shoot was a success. People printed twelve plates, and pictures were exhibited in London and New York City. One of the portraits was of artist Doris Zinkeisen who was commissioned together with her sister Anna to paint several murals for the Queen Mary. Another major coup was being invited to take portraits of leading peers to mark the coronation of King George VI and Queen Elizabeth. She joined the Royal Photographic Society briefly in 1921 and then again in 1933, and became a Fellow in 1940. The RPS Collection holds examples of her work.

Yevonde's most famous work was inspired by a theme party held on 5 March 1935, where guests dressed as Roman and Greek gods and goddesses. Yevonde subsequently took studio portraits of many of the participants (and others), in appropriate costume and surrounded by appropriate objects. This series of prints showed Yevonde at her most creative, using colour, costume and props to build an otherworldly air around her subjects. She went on to produce further series based on the signs of the zodiac and the months of the year. Partly influenced by surrealist artists, particularly Man Ray, Yevonde used surprising juxtapositions of objects which displayed her sense of humour. Another 1935 work, a portrait of Princess Alice, Duchess of Gloucester, is the earliest surviving colour print of a member of the British royal family.

This highly creative period of Yevonde's career would only last a few years. At the end of 1939, Colour Photographs Ltd closed, and the Vivex process was no more. It was the second major blow to Yevonde that year—her husband, the playwright Edgar Middleton, had died in April. Yevonde returned to working in black and white, and produced many notable portraits. By the mid-1960s, the importance of both her work and that of other experimental British photographers of the 1920s and 1930s had largely been forgotten. However, there was a revival of interest in her work after this was the subject of an exhibition at the National Portrait Gallery in 1990.

Yvonde continued working up until her death, just two weeks short of her 83rd birthday, but is chiefly remembered for her work of the 1930s, which did much to make colour photography respectable. In her 1940 memoir, In Camera, Yevonde wrote, 'I took up photography with the definite purpose of making myself independent. I wanted to earn money of my own'.

== Exhibitions ==
- Be Original or Die Photographs by Madame Yevonde in 1953 featured 64 color photographs produced from original glass plate negatives and Vivex prints. It showed her Goddesses series of 1935, in which society women posed in, surreal, mythical guises.
- Madame Yevonde: Colour, Fantasy & Myth was a retrospective of her work at the Royal Photographic Society, Bath and the National Portrait Gallery, London in 1990. An exhibition catalogue was also published by the Gallery.
- Goddesses and Others: Photographs by Madame Yevonde in 2005 at the National Portrait Gallery, London displayed 15 of her colour photographs from the 1930s.
- Yevonde: Life and Colour, a third National Portrait Gallery exhibition, opened in London on 22 June 2023, with an accompanying catalogue edited by Clare Freestone.

== See also ==
- Robin Warwick Gibson
