= Cecil Beaton =

British photographer and designer (1904–1980)

Sir Cecil Beaton CBE
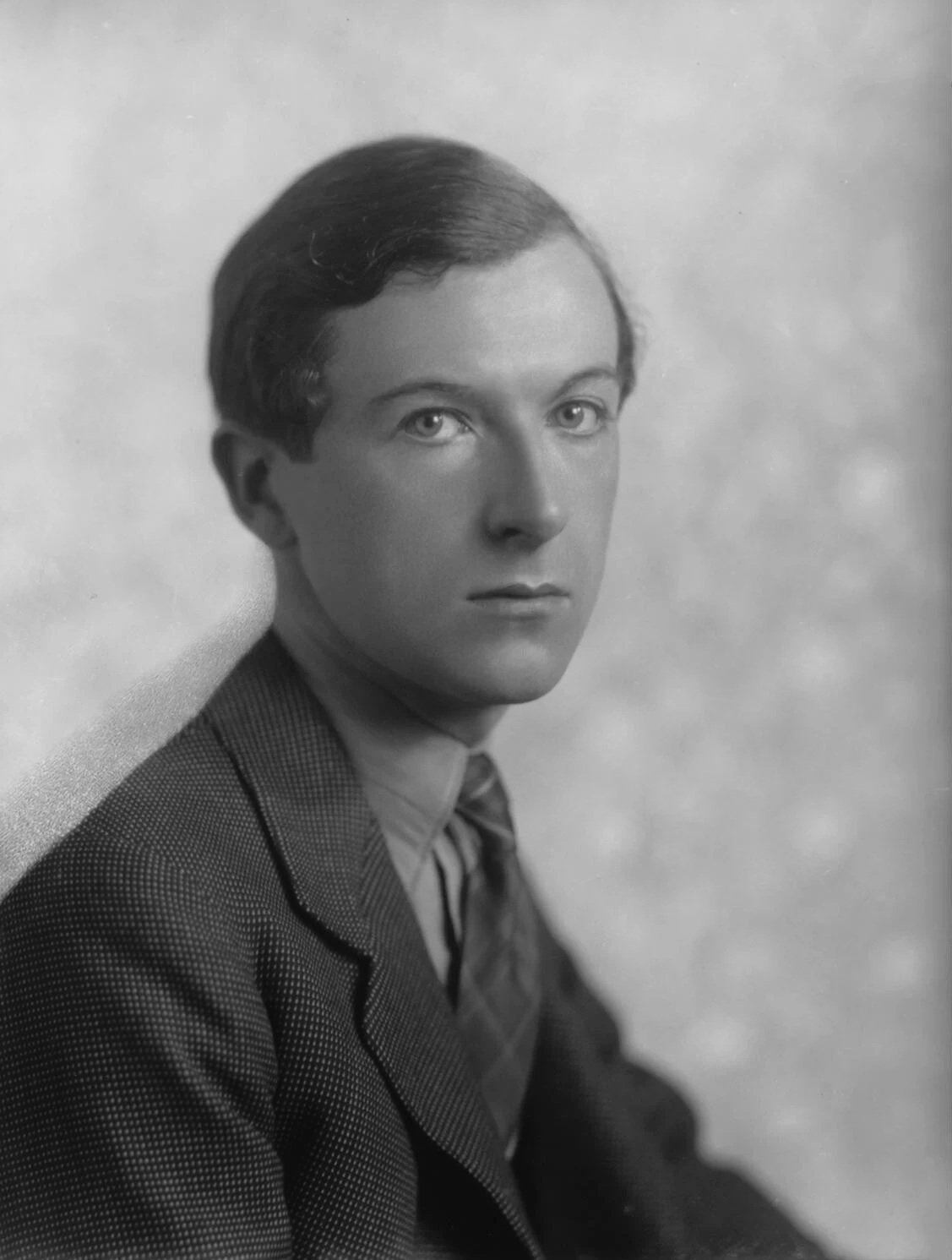
- Beaton in 1928
- Born: Cecil Walter Hardy Beaton; 14 January 1904; Hampstead, London, England
- Died: 18 January 1980 (aged 76); Reddish House, Broad Chalke, Wiltshire, England
- Resting place: All Saints' church graveyard, Broad Chalke, Wiltshire, England
- Education: Heath Mount School; St Cyprian's School; Harrow School; St John's College, Cambridge
- Occupations: Photographer; interior designer; socialite; writer; costume designer
- Relatives: Baba Beaton (sister); Nancy Beaton (sister)

Sir Cecil Walter Hardy Beaton (14 January 1904 – 18 January 1980) was a British photographer, designer, and diarist. Renowned for his elegant and often theatrical style, Beaton's work appeared in leading publications such as Vogue and Harper's Bazaar. He gained international acclaim for his portraits of celebrities, royalty, and socialites, as well as his work in fashion, theatre, and film. Though he is best known for his celebrity portraits, Beaton was also one of the most prolific photographers of life during World War II, taking over 7,000 photographs between 1940 and 1945 in Britain, as well as in China and Africa.

In addition to his photography, Beaton won three Academy Awards, including two for Best Costume Design (Gigi, 1958; My Fair Lady, 1964) and one for Best Art Direction (My Fair Lady, 1964), and received several Tony Awards for his work in theatre. He was also celebrated for his diaries and memoirs, which documented the cultural and social life of his era. Knighted in 1972, he was also recognised with numerous honours for his contributions to photography, design, and the arts, cementing his legacy as one of the 20th century's most influential visual artists.

== Early life and education ==
Beaton was born on 14 January 1904 in Hampstead, north London, the son of Ernest Walter Hardy Beaton (1867–1936), a prosperous timber merchant, and his wife, Esther "Etty" Sisson (1872–1962). His grandfather, Walter Hardy Beaton (1841–1904), had founded the family business of "Beaton Brothers Timber Merchants and Agents", and his father followed into the business. Ernest Beaton was an amateur actor and met Etty when playing the lead in a play. She was the daughter of a Cumbrian blacksmith named Joseph Sisson and had come to London to visit her married sister.

Ernest and Etty Beaton had four children – Cecil; two daughters, Nancy Elizabeth Louise Beaton (1909–99, who married Sir Hugh Smiley, Bt.) and Barbara Jessica Beaton (1912–73, known as Baba, who married Alec Hambro); and another son, Reginald Ernest Hardy Beaton (1905–33).

Cecil Beaton was educated at Heath Mount School (where he was bullied by Evelyn Waugh) and St Cyprian's School, Eastbourne, where his artistic talent was quickly recognised. Both Cyril Connolly and Henry Longhurst report in their autobiographies being overwhelmed by the beauty of Beaton's singing at the St Cyprian's school concerts.

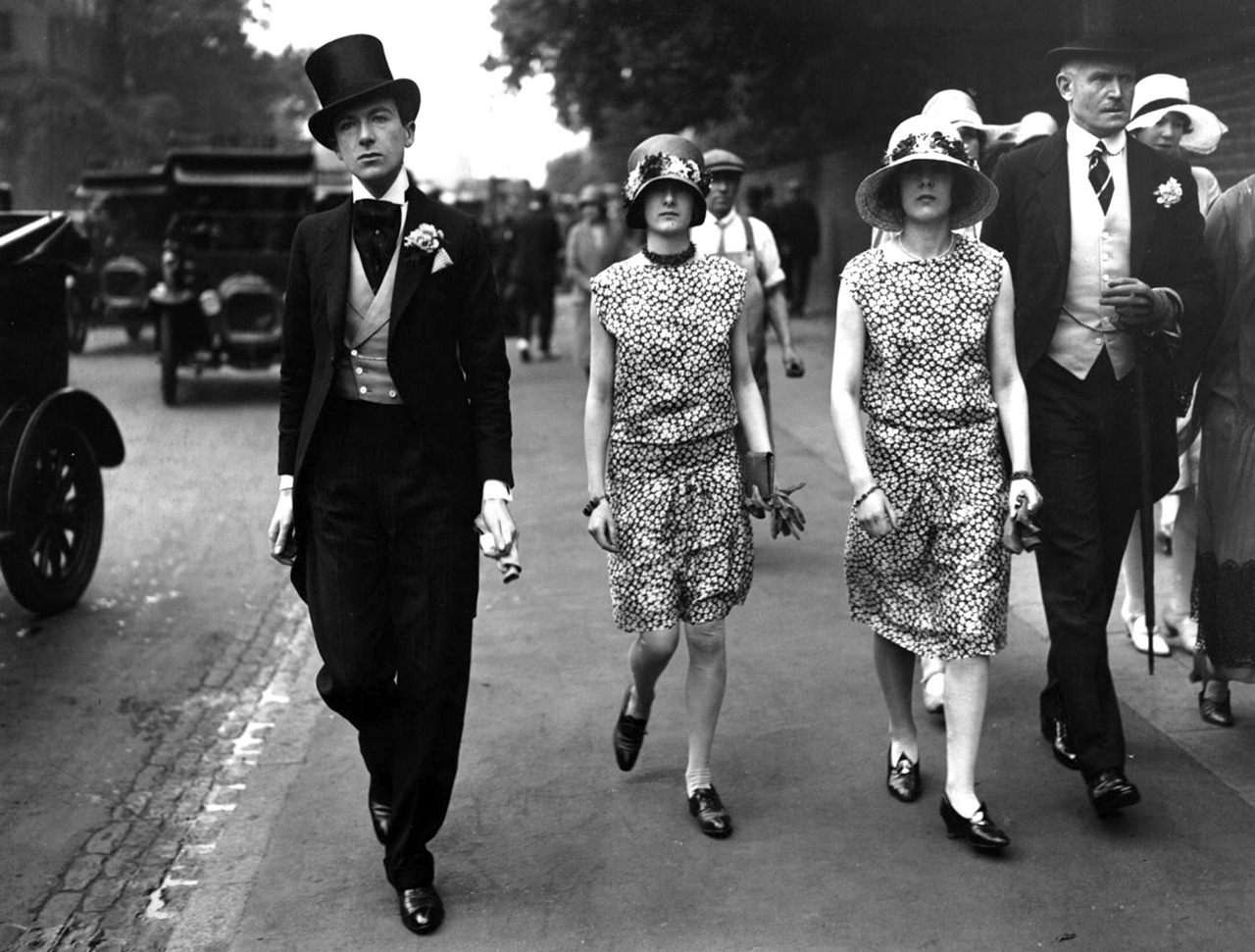
Beaton alongside his sisters Nancy and Barbara, 1930

When Beaton was growing up, his nanny had a Kodak 3A Camera, a popular model which was renowned for being an ideal piece of equipment to learn on. Beaton's nanny began teaching him the basics of photography and developing film. He would often get his sisters and mother to sit for him. When he was sufficiently proficient, he would send the photos off to London society magazines, often writing under a pen name and "recommending" the work of Beaton.

Beaton attended Harrow School, and then, despite having little or no interest in academia, moved on to St John's College, Cambridge, and studied history, art and architecture. Beaton continued his photography and, through his university contacts, got a portrait depicting the Duchess of Malfi published in Vogue. It was actually George "Dadie" Rylands – "a slightly out-of-focus snapshot of him as Webster's Duchess of Malfi standing in the sub-aqueous light outside the men's lavatory of the ADC Theatre at Cambridge." Beaton left Cambridge in 1925 without a degree.

== Career ==
=== Photography ===
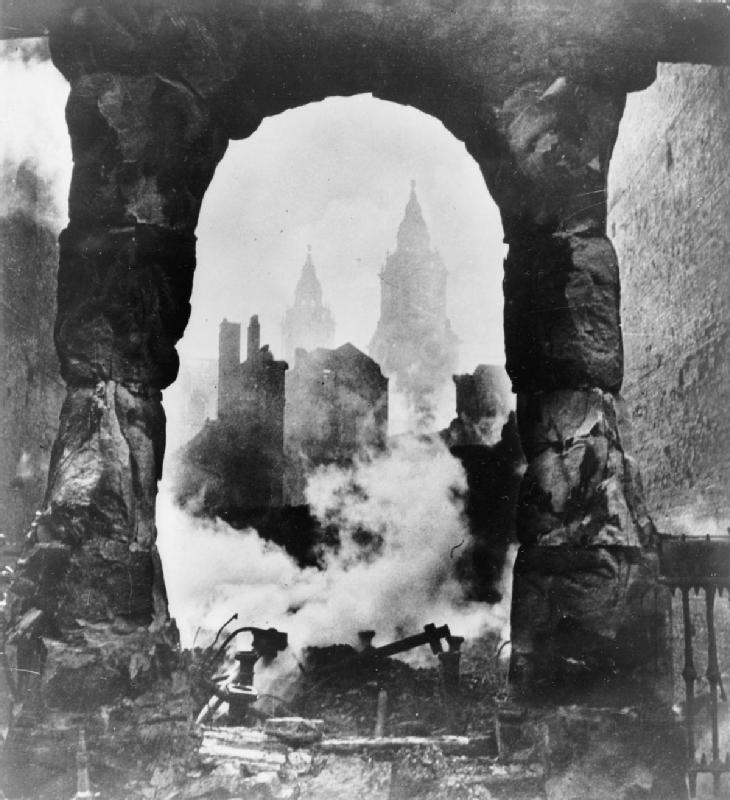
Beaton's photograph of the bell towers of St Paul's Cathedral in London, seen through an archway after an incendiary raid, 1940

After a short time in the family timber business, he worked with a cement merchant in Holborn. This resulted in "an orgy of photography at weekends", so he decided to strike out on his own. Beaton's first camera was a Box Brownie. Over the course of his career, he employed both large format cameras, and smaller Rolleiflex cameras. In his early career Beaton's first published photograph appeared in British Vogue in April 1924, a portrait of academic George "Dadie" Rylands, which earned him a modest fee but marked the start of his professional life in photography.

After leaving Cambridge without a degree in 1925, he briefly worked on book jacket designs and theatrical costumes and learned photography at Paul Tanqueray's studio. Under the patronage of Osbert Sitwell he put on his first exhibition in the Cooling Gallery, London in 1927. That year, he began contributing regularly to Vogue under Condé Nast, quickly becoming a prolific and respected contributor who photographed high society figures, debutantes, and aristocratic circles. He had "a contract with Condé Nast Publications to take photographs exclusively for them for several thousand pounds a year for several years to come."

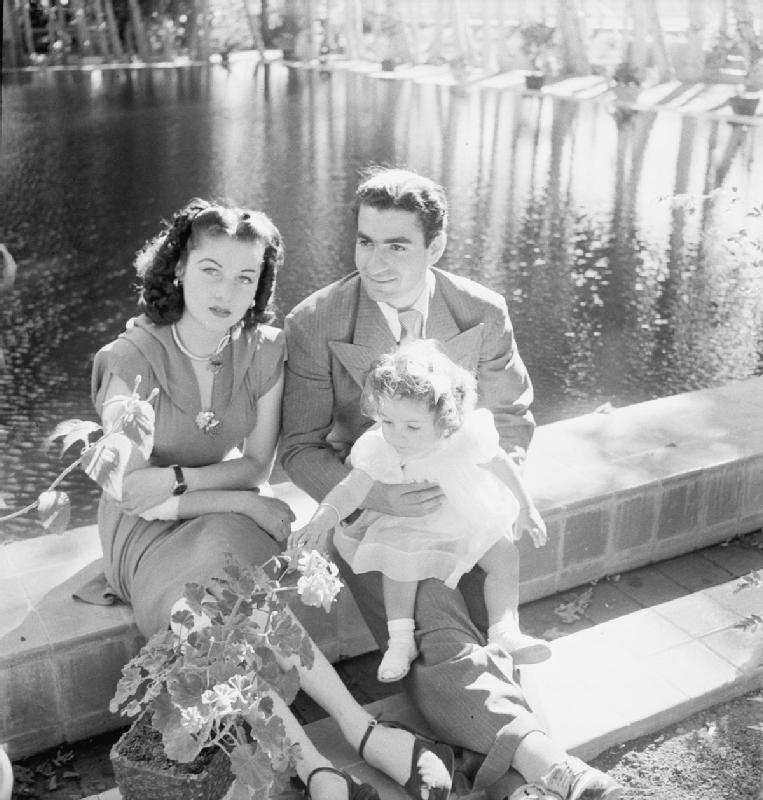
Beaton's photograph of Queen Fawzia Fuad Chirine with Shah Mohammed Reza Pahlavi and their daughter, Princess Shahnaz Pahlavi, in Tehran, 1942

Believing he would find greater success in the United States, Beaton moved to New York in 1928, gradually establishing his reputation. He thereafter spent part of each year working in the city, living in stylish hotel suites he redecorated in his "Japanese art nouveau" style in exchange for reduced rent. He photographed high-society figures such as Mrs. Cornelius Vanderbilt and the future Duchess of Windsor, and even adopted disguises, including impersonating the notorious Lady Mendl at a fancy-dress ball. Beaton's early photographic style was distinctive for blending Edwardian stage portraiture with European avant‑garde influences, moving beyond the soft‑focus, imported American images that had dominated fashion magazines up to that point. Encounters with influential figures such as Edith Sitwell and Stephen Tennant helped shape his focus on elegance and the British upper class. Beaton's photographs of Tennant and his circle are regarded as some of the finest visual records of the Bright Young Things of the 1920s and 1930s, capturing the glamour and exuberance of that social milieu.

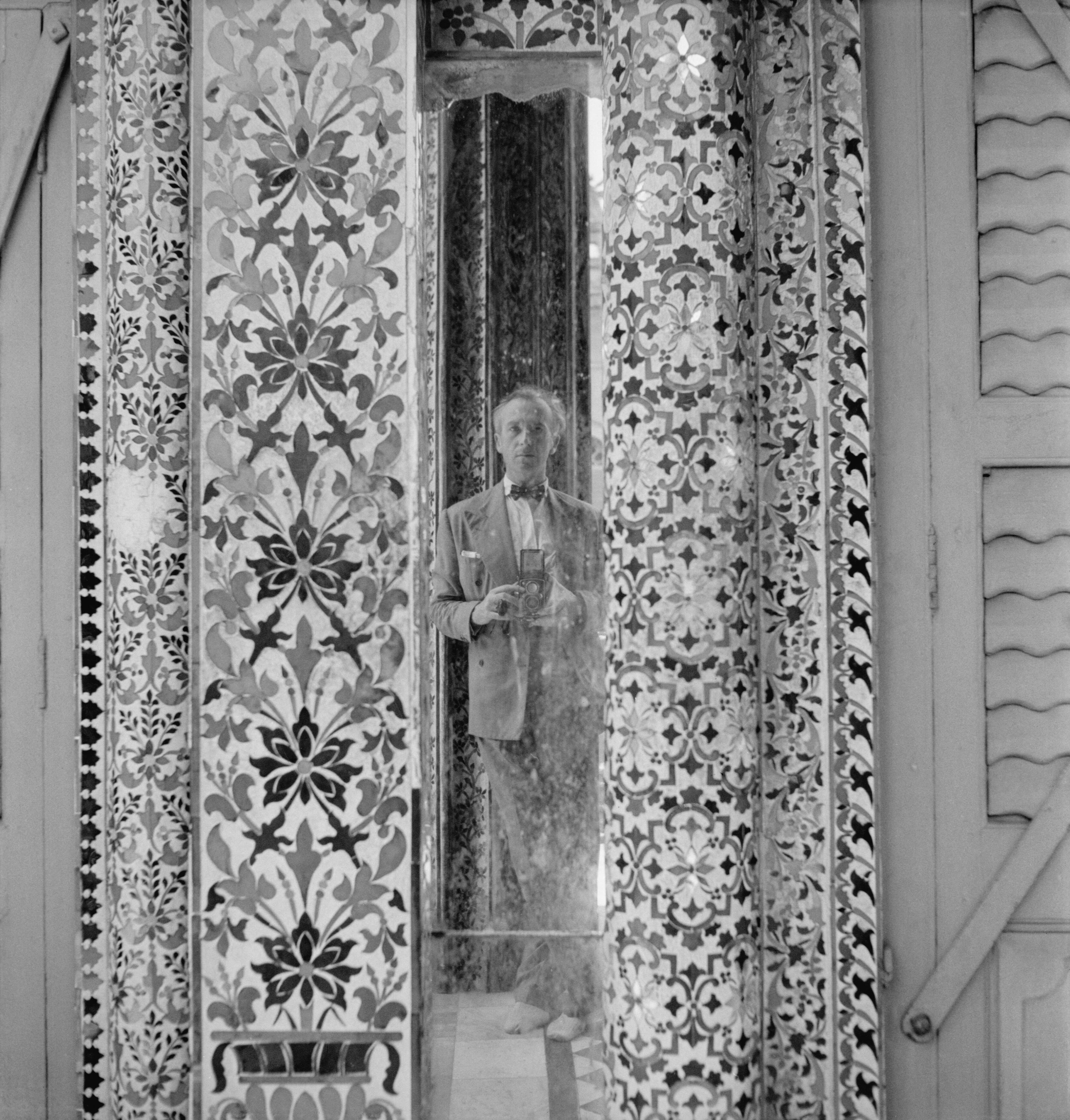
Beaton's self-portrait with his Rolleiflex reflected in a mirror of the Jain temple, Calcutta, India, 1944

Beaton was renowned for his fashion photography and society portraits, capturing figures across British and international high society. He was a photographer for the British edition of Vogue in 1931 when George Hoyningen-Huene, photographer for French Vogue, travelled to England with his new friend Horst. Horst himself would begin to work for French Vogue in November of that year. The exchange and cross pollination of ideas between this collegial circle of artists across the Channel and the Atlantic gave rise to the look of style and sophistication associated with the 1930s.

In addition to contributing extensively to Vogue and working as a staff photographer for Vanity Fair, and he also photographed Hollywood celebrities, including Katharine Hepburn, Marlene Dietrich, and Audrey Hepburn, as well as prominent political and royal figures. In 1938, Beaton became embroiled in controversy when he inserted small but legible anti-Semitic phrases, including the word "kike," into an illustration in American Vogue about New York society. The issue was recalled and reprinted, and Beaton was subsequently dismissed from the magazine.

Beaton returned to England, where the Queen recommended him to the Ministry of Information (MoI). He became a leading war photographer, best known for his images of the damage done by the German Blitz. With his style sharpened and his range broadened, Beaton's career was restored by the war. Beaton took over 7,000 photographs between 1940 and 1945 in Britain as well as in China and Africa.

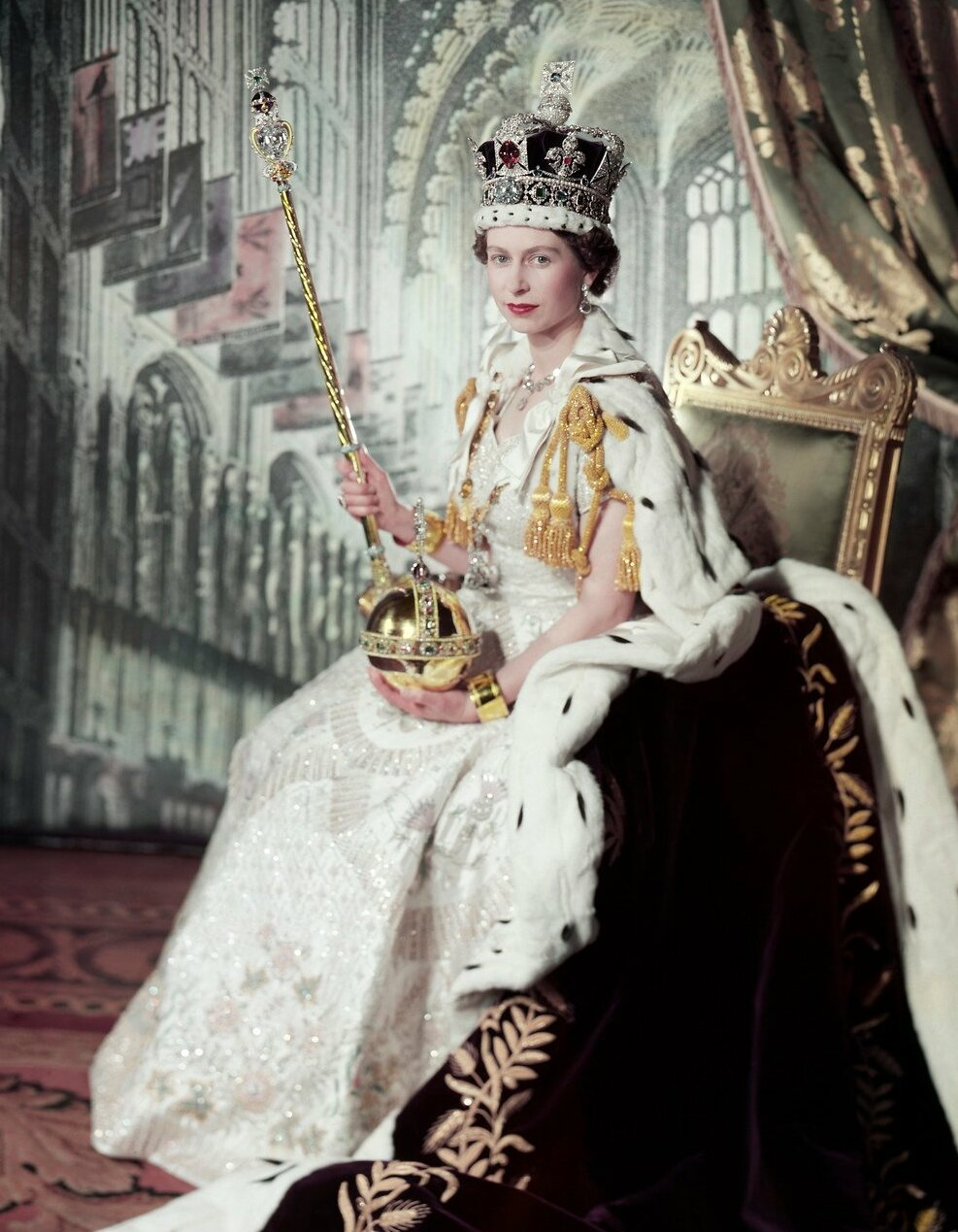
Beaton's photograph of Queen Elizabeth II on her coronation day, 1953

During World War II, Beaton was first posted to the MoI and given the task of recording images from the home front. During this assignment he captured one of the most enduring images of British suffering during the war, that of 3-year-old Blitz victim Eileen Dunne recovering in hospital, clutching her beloved teddy bear. When the image was published, America had not yet joined the war, but images such as Beaton's helped push the Americans to put pressure on their government to help Britain in its hour of need.

Beaton's photographs of the British royal family played a central role in shaping the monarchy's public image. Beginning in the late 1930s, he developed a long-standing relationship with the royal household, photographing figures including Queen Elizabeth (later the Queen Mother)—his favourite royal sitter—and Elizabeth II over several decades. His work ranged from highly staged, painterly compositions to more intimate portraits, balancing grandeur with accessibility; he once even kept the Queen Mother's scented handkerchief as a memento of a successful sitting. Beaton's images captured key moments, such as the 1953 coronation of Elizabeth II and portraits of the royal children. He also produced notable images of the Duke and Duchess of Windsor, including their wedding photographs, and his 1951 portrait of Princess Margaret in a Dior dress for her 21st birthday became one of the most iconic royal images of the 20th century.

In 1951, Beaton published his memoir Photobiography. To coincide with its release, Vogue published a June 1951 photo spread highlighting his career, illustrating his progression from early society portraits to his later work in Hollywood, wartime photography, and official portraits of the British royal family.

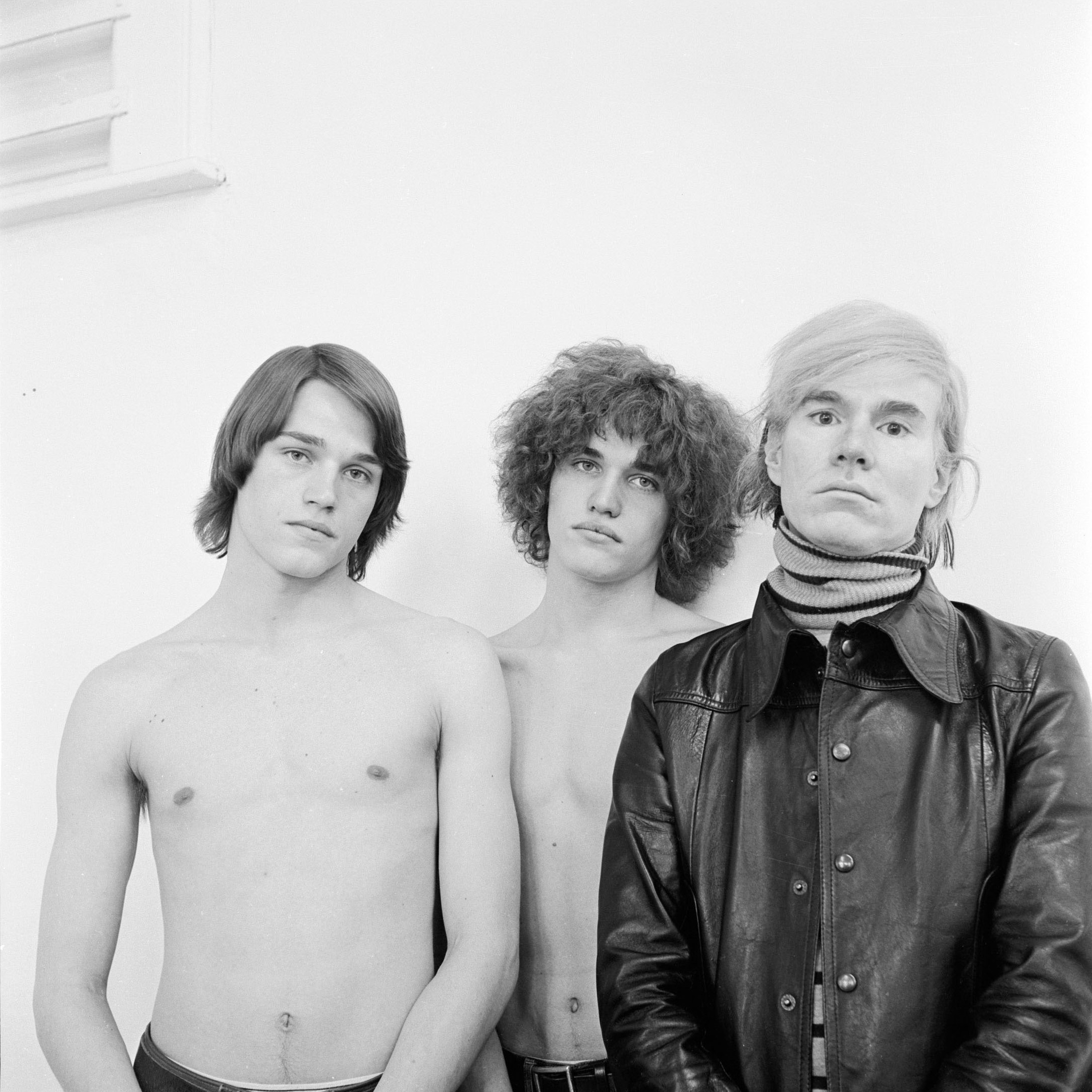
Beaton's photograph of Andy Warhol with his partner Jed Johnson and Johnson's twin brother, Jay Johnson, at the Factory, 1969

Beaton had a major influence on and relationship with Angus McBean and David Bailey. McBean was a well-known portrait photographer of his era. Later in his career, his work was influenced by Beaton. Bailey was influenced by Beaton when they met while working for British Vogue in the early 1960s. Bailey's use of square format (6x6) images is similar to Beaton's own working patterns.

In 1968, the National Portrait Gallery in London mounted its inaugural photographic exhibition Beaton Portraits 1928-68. Furthermore, it was the first time a retrospective of a living photographer's work was shown at a British national museum. The exhibition, which was viewed by over 80,000 people, featured themed rooms with photographs of the royal family, war heroes, authors, composers, and celebrities. The exhibition travelled to the United States and was displayed as 600 Faces by Beaton 1928-69 at the Museum of the City of New York in 1969. Just weeks before the New York opening, Beaton photographed Andy Warhol and members of his Factory as a last-minute addition to the show. The exhibition proved so popular that it was extended for a month and subsequently toured the country under museum auspices.

In November 1977, Beaton came out of retirement to photograph a Bill Blass design for an advertisement published in Vogue, Harper's Bazaar, Town & Country, and The New Yorker in February 1978.

In 2025, a scrapbook assembled by darkroom assistant Roland Haupt of unpublished photographs by Beaton and Lee Miller surfaced from a private collection; photography dealer Michael Hoppen arranged the sale of the scrapbook to the University of Oxford's Bodleian Libraries in April 2026. The scrapbook includes Beaton's pictures of North Africa, as well as theatre sets and newspaper cuttings.

=== Stage and film design ===
Beaton combined wide-ranging interests with notable versatility, achieving success across multiple artistic fields. He designed acclaimed costumes and sets for several ballets, and after the war created sets, costumes, and lighting for London and New York productions of Oscar Wilde's Lady Windermere's Fan. In 1946, he also performed the role of Mr. Cecil Graham in the New York production for twenty-five weeks. In 1951, he designed costumes for Ronald Duncan's play at the Festival of Britain, while his own production, The Gainsborough Girls, featuring his costume designs, opened at the Brighton Festival.

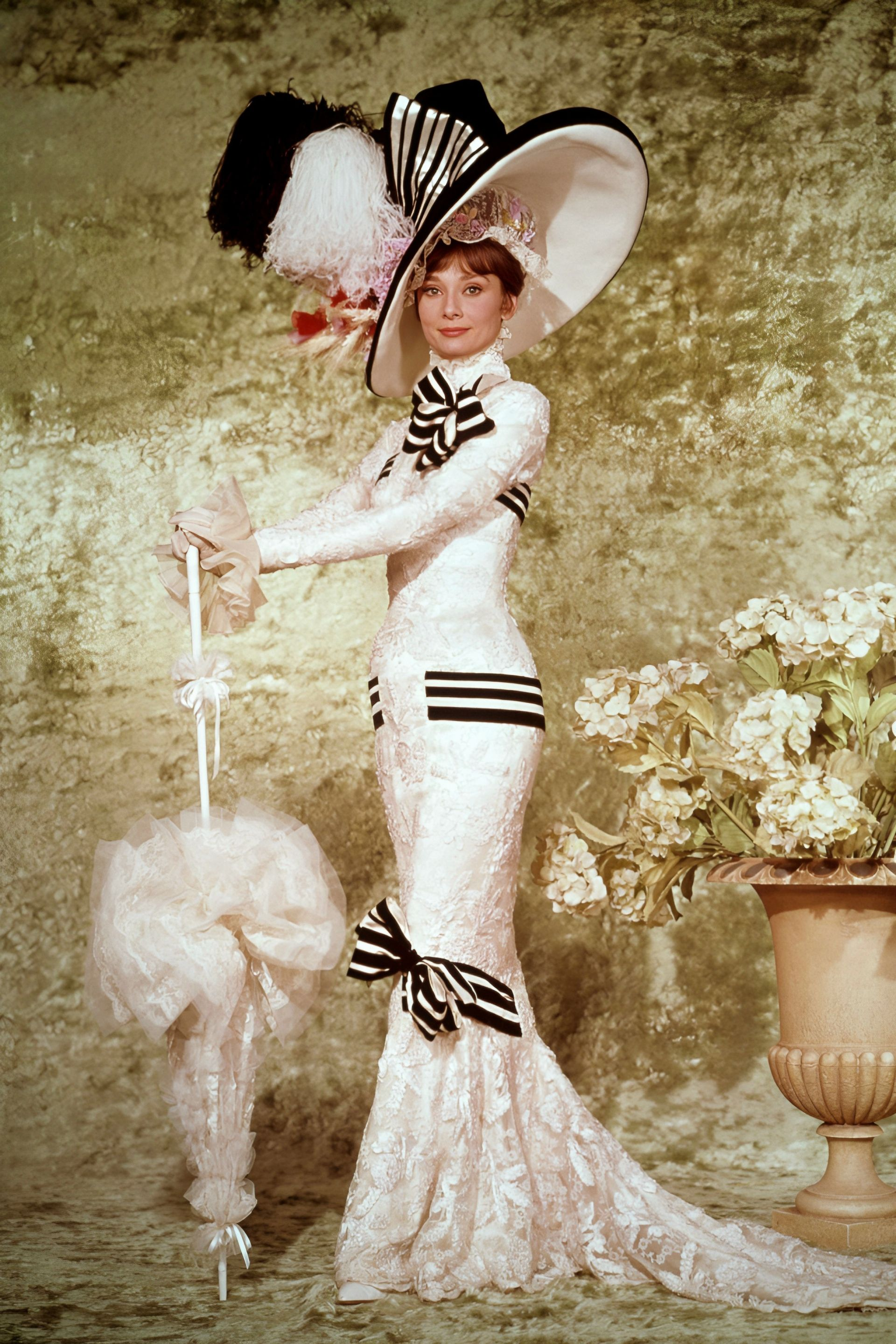
Audrey Hepburn wearing a Beaton design in My Fair Lady (1964), for which he won an Academy Award for Best Costume Design

His costumes for Lerner and Loewe's musical play My Fair Lady (1956) were highly praised. This led to him being the designer for two Lerner and Loewe film musicals, Gigi (1958) and My Fair Lady (1964), each of which earned Beaton the Academy Award for Best Costume Design. He also designed the period costumes for On a Clear Day You Can See Forever.

His additional Broadway credits include The Grass Harp (1952), The Chalk Garden (1955), Saratoga (1959), Tenderloin (1960), and Coco (1969). He was the recipient of four Tony Awards.

He designed the sets and costumes for a production of Giacomo Puccini's last opera Turandot, first used at the Metropolitan Opera in New York and then at Covent Garden.

Beaton designed the academic dress of the University of East Anglia.

=== Diaries ===
Cecil Beaton was a published and well-known diarist. In his lifetime, six volumes of diaries were published, spanning the years 1922–1974. A more selective but unexpurgated edition was published in 2003. Hugo Vickers, its editor, commented: "In the [earlier] published diaries, opinions are softened, celebrated figures are hailed as wonders and triumphs, whereas in the originals, Cecil can be as venomous as anyone I have ever read or heard in the most shocking of conversation."

== Later years and death ==
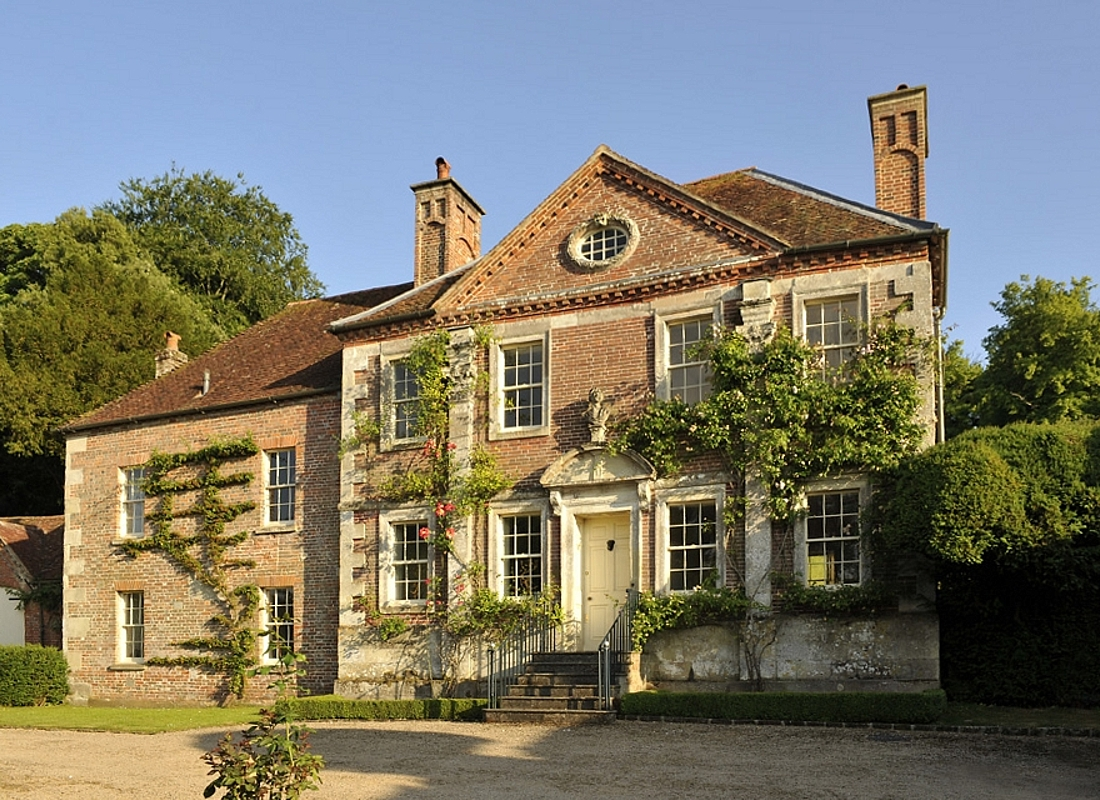
Reddish House in Broad Chalke, Wiltshire

=== Health issues and archive ===
He suffered a stroke that left him permanently paralysed on the right side of his body. Although he learnt to write and draw with his left hand, and had cameras adapted, Beaton became frustrated by the limitations the stroke had put upon his work. As a result of his stroke, Beaton became anxious about financial security for his old age and, in 1976, entered into negotiations with Philippe Garner, expert-in-charge of photographs at Sotheby's.

On behalf of the auction house, Garner acquired Beaton's archive – excluding all portraits of the Royal Family, and the five decades of prints held by Vogue in London, Paris and New York. Garner, who had almost single-handedly invented the photographic auction, oversaw the archive's preservation and partial dispersal, so that Beaton's only tangible assets, and what he considered his life's work, would ensure him an annual income. The first of five auctions was held in 1977, the last in 1980.

=== Last public interview ===
The last public interview given by Sir Cecil Beaton was in January 1980 for an edition of the BBC's radio programme Desert Island Discs. The interviewer was Roy Plomley. The recording was broadcast posthumously on Friday 1 February 1980 following the Beaton family's permission. Owing to Beaton's frailty, the interview was recorded at Beaton's home, Reddish House.

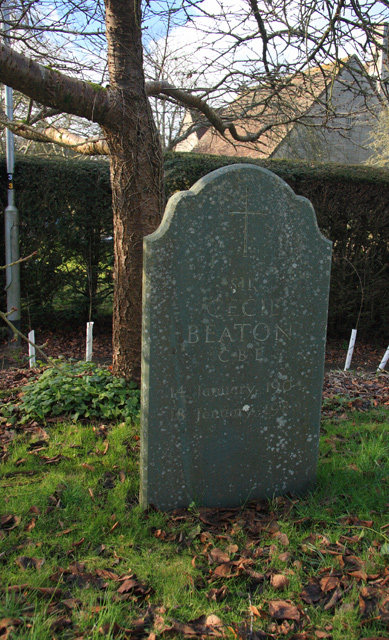
Sir Cecil Beaton's grave at Broad Chalke Churchyard

Beato recalled events in his life, particularly from the 1930s and 1940s (the Blitz). Among the recollections were his associations with stars of Hollywood and British Royalty notably The Duke and Duchess of Windsor (whose official wedding photographs Beaton took on 3 June 1937 at relatively short notice); and official portraits of Queen Elizabeth (later Queen Elizabeth The Queen Mother) and Queen Elizabeth II on her Coronation day on 2 June 1953. The interview also alluded to a lifelong passion for performing arts and in particular ballet and operetta.

The Beaton programme is considered to be almost the final words on an era of "Bright Young Things" whose sunset had taken place by the time of the abdication of Edward VIII. Beaton commented specifically on Wallis Simpson (later titled The Duchess of Windsor after her marriage to the former King Edward VIII). The Duchess of Windsor was still alive at the time of the original Beaton interview and broadcast.

Beaton said that the one record that he would retain on the desert island should the others get washed away would be Beethoven's Symphony No 1, and his chosen book was a compendium of photographs he had taken down the years of "...people known and unknown; people known but now forgotten".

=== Death ===
By the end of the 1970s, Beaton's health had faded. He died on 18 January 1980 at Reddish House, four days after his 76th birthday.

== Personal life ==
=== Relationships and sexuality ===
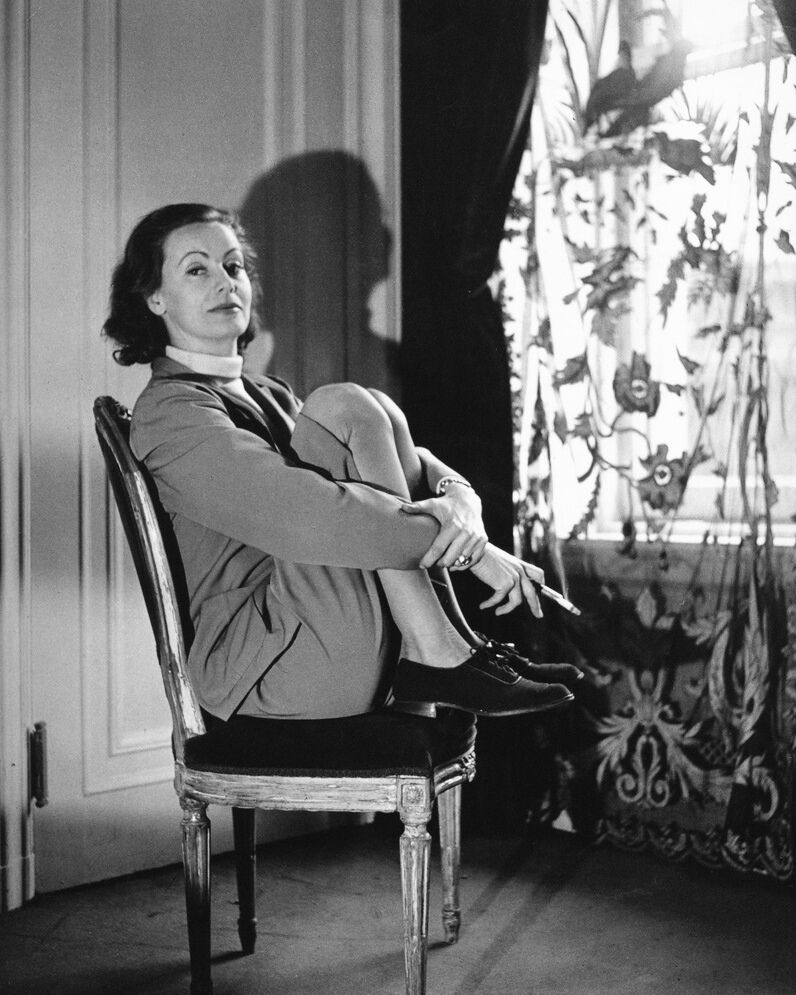
Greta Garbo photographed by Beaton, 1946

Beaton never married, but he had relationships with various women, including actress Coral Browne, dancer Adele Astaire, Greek socialite Madame Jean Ralli (Julie Marie 'Lilia' Pringo), and British socialite Doris Castlerosse. Despite his public flamboyance and numerous affairs, Beaton privately struggled with the inability to live openly as a homosexual and much of his creative life was underlined by a life of careful discretion. "I'm a terrible homosexualist", he wrote in his diary.

Beaton met actress Greta Garbo in 1932, and they renewed their acquaintance years later. In his 1951 memoir Photobiography, Beaton said, "Of all the women I have ever seen, Miss Garbo is by far the most beautiful. After our first encounter in Hollywood, many years passed before I met her again; but the passage of time had only improved her lunar beauty, given her features a more chiselled sensitivity, and her expression a more touching nobility." His infatuation developed into a romantic but largely unreciprocated relationship in 1947, and although he considered marriage, he faced competition from Garbo's companion, George Schlee. Their relationship was strained in part by critical remarks Beaton had written about her in his Scrapbook in 1937, which resurfaced publicly in 1951 and caused tension; they later reconciled somewhat and maintained a friendship.

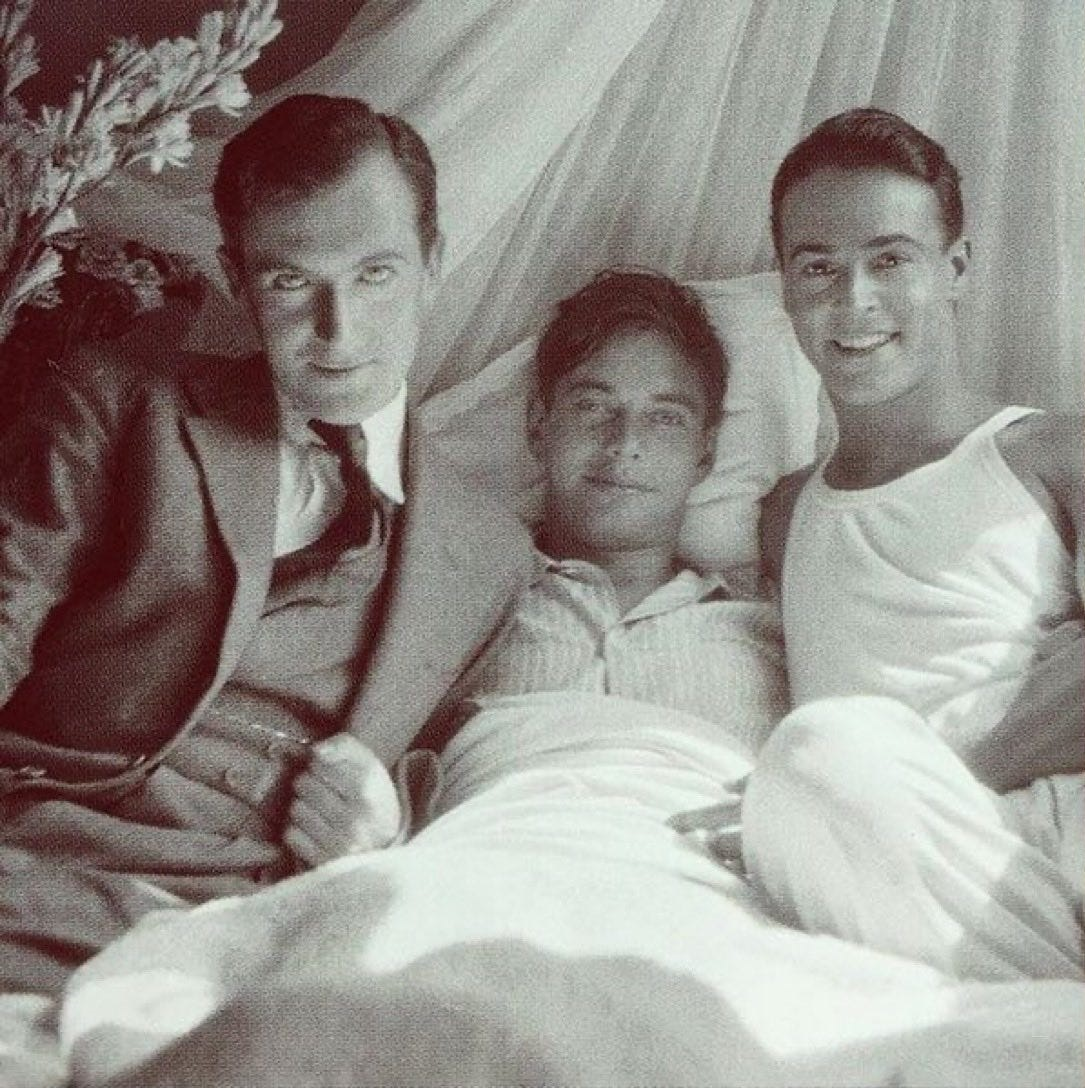
Beaton with friends Peter Watson and Oliver Messel, c. 1930s

Beaton had a deep love for British art collector Peter Watson, though the two never became lovers. Beaton met Watson in Vienna in 1930, initially finding him unremarkable, though he soon became captivated. The two spent time together travelling and visiting antique shops, and Beaton quickly developed a deep emotional attachment. During a subsequent trip to Venice, where they stayed with friends including Oliver Messel, Beaton's infatuation intensified, particularly as he cared for Watson during an illness. However, Watson and Messel soon became romantically involved, leaving Beaton distressed but determined to win Watson's affection. This marked the beginning of a four-year period of intense obsession, during which Beaton closely imitated Watson's style and mannerisms. "Cecil's work and social life became of secondary consideration to this great passion, from which he never wholly freed himself," wrote biographer Hugo Vickers.

While working on the film My Fair Lady (1964), Beaton met American Olympic fencer Kinmont Hoitsma during a visit to San Francisco in March 1963. Staying with socialite Whitney Warren, Beaton explored the city's nightlife and encountered Hoitsma at the Tool Box bar; the two quickly formed a close bond, spending time hiking in Big Sur and camping in Yosemite Valley. Their relationship continued in London, where Hoitsma lived with Beaton in 1964. Although Hoitsma returned to California after a year, they remained close friends. In an August 1972 diary entry, Beaton wrote of Hoitsma: "We have a wonderful rapport. He is exactly the opposite of me, yet we complement one another so well. His brain is analytical, mine instinctive. We can criticise each other's work and are of great help. But Kin's great attraction to me is that he makes allowances."

In 1966, Beaton met Sam Green, an American modern art curator who would become his travel companion. According to Green, their relationship was not romantic or sexual but rather a "mythical bachelor uncle handsome euphemistic nephew-type situation." In 1970, Beaton and Green travelled together in South America and later toured the Dordogne in France. In 1973, they travelled through Italy, visiting Countess Diana Phipps in Padua and attending the Volpi Ball in Venice. In 1974, they travelled to Mexico and Guatemala. Beaton was interviewed by Green and interior designer Suzie Frankfurt at the Pierre Hotel in New York for the April 1978 issue of Interview.

=== Residences ===
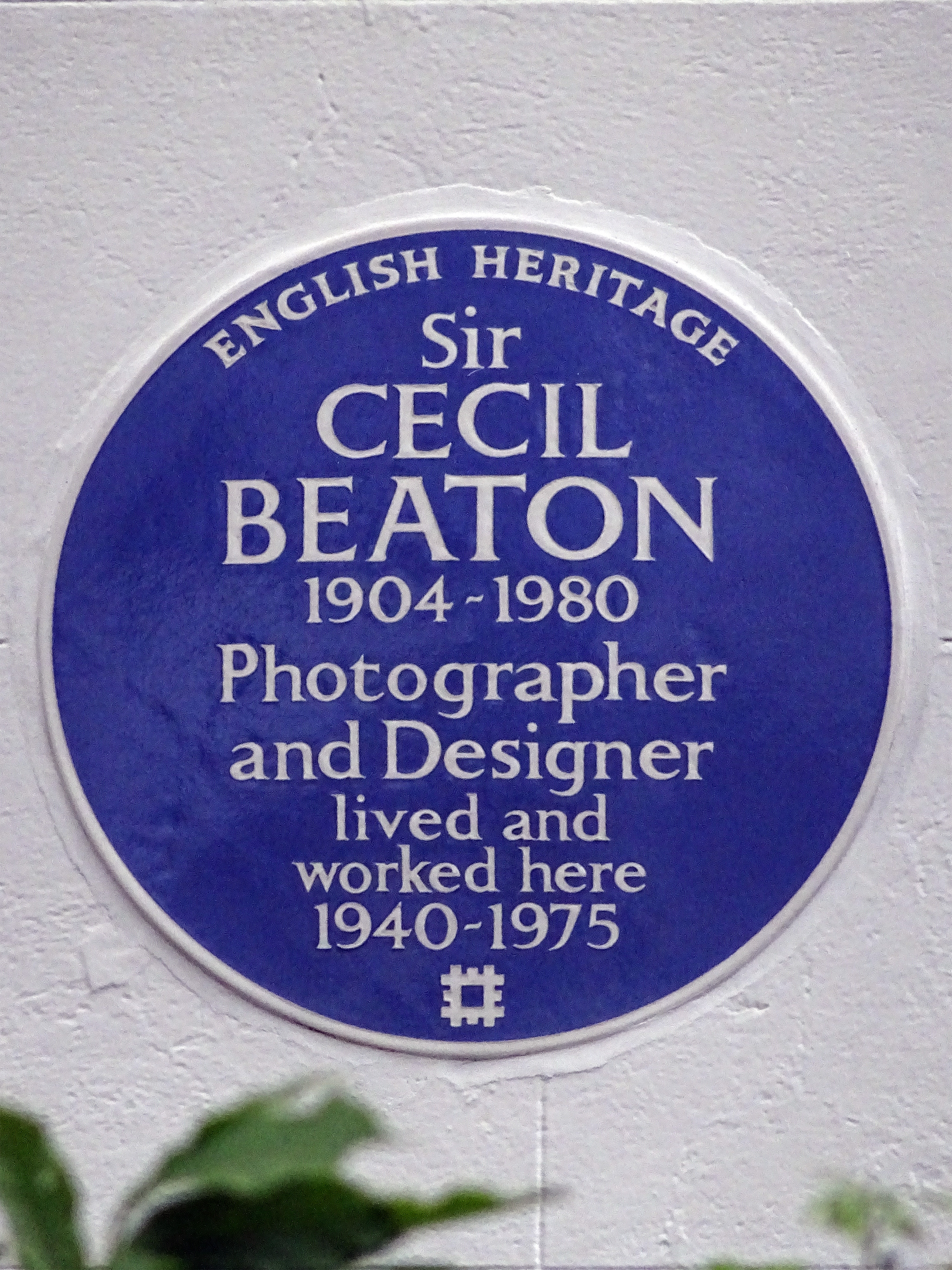
A plaque honoring Beaton at 8 Pelham Place in London

Beaton's homes were central to his creative life and reflected his interests in art, design, and entertaining. He leased Ashcombe House, a country estate in Wiltshire, from 1930 to 1945, where he hosted many notable figures and developed his theatrical interior style.

In 1940, Beaton moved to 8 Pelham Place, a terraced house in Kensington, London designed in 1833 by George Basevi. He decorated it eclectically, mixing styles and paintings, and it was described by Chips Channon as a "tiny but super-attractive snuff-box of a house." In 1962 he updated the interiors in a contemporary style, featuring a mustard stair carpet and black velvet with gold embroidery. Over 35 years at Pelham Place, Beaton produced an extensive body of work, photographing figures including John Osborne, Arthur Miller, Rose Macaulay, Mick Jagger, Patrick Lichfield, Benjamin Britten, Twiggy, Sir William and Lady Walton, and Gilbert & George.

In 1947, he purchased the 17th-century Reddish House in Broad Chalke, also in Wiltshire, set in 2.5 acres of gardens. He transformed its interiors and gardens, adding rooms on the eastern side, extending the parlour southwards, and introducing many new fittings. He remained at the house until his death in 1980 and is buried in the parish church graveyard.

His hotel suites in New York similarly served as stages for his refined taste and elaborate décor, with interiors that fuelled his passions for fashion, gardening, and village life. These spaces have since been the subject of exhibitions and publications exploring Beaton's approach to personal and domestic aesthetics.

== Awards and honours ==
Throughout his career, Cecil Beaton received numerous awards and distinctions recognizing his work in theatre, film, and photography, as well as his contributions to British cultural life.

- 1955 – Tony Award for Best Costume Design for Quadrille
- 1956 – Appointed Commander of the Order of the British Empire (CBE)
- 1957 – Tony Award for Best Costume Design for My Fair Lady
- 1957 – Elected Fellow of the Ancient Monuments Society
- 1958 – Academy Award for Best Costume Design for Gigi
- 1960 – Tony Award for Best Costume Design for Saratoga
- 1960 – Appointed Chevalier de la Légion d'Honneur
- 1964 – Academy Award for Best Art Direction for My Fair Lady
- 1964 – Academy Award for Best Costume Design for My Fair Lady
- 1965 – Named Honorary Fellow of the Royal Photographic Society of Great Britain
- 1970 – Tony Award for Best Costume Design for Coco
- 1970 – Inducted into the International Best Dressed Hall of Fame List
- 1972 – Knighted (Knight Bachelor)
- 2020 – English Heritage erected a plaque at Beaton's residence at 8 Pelham Place

== Exhibitions ==
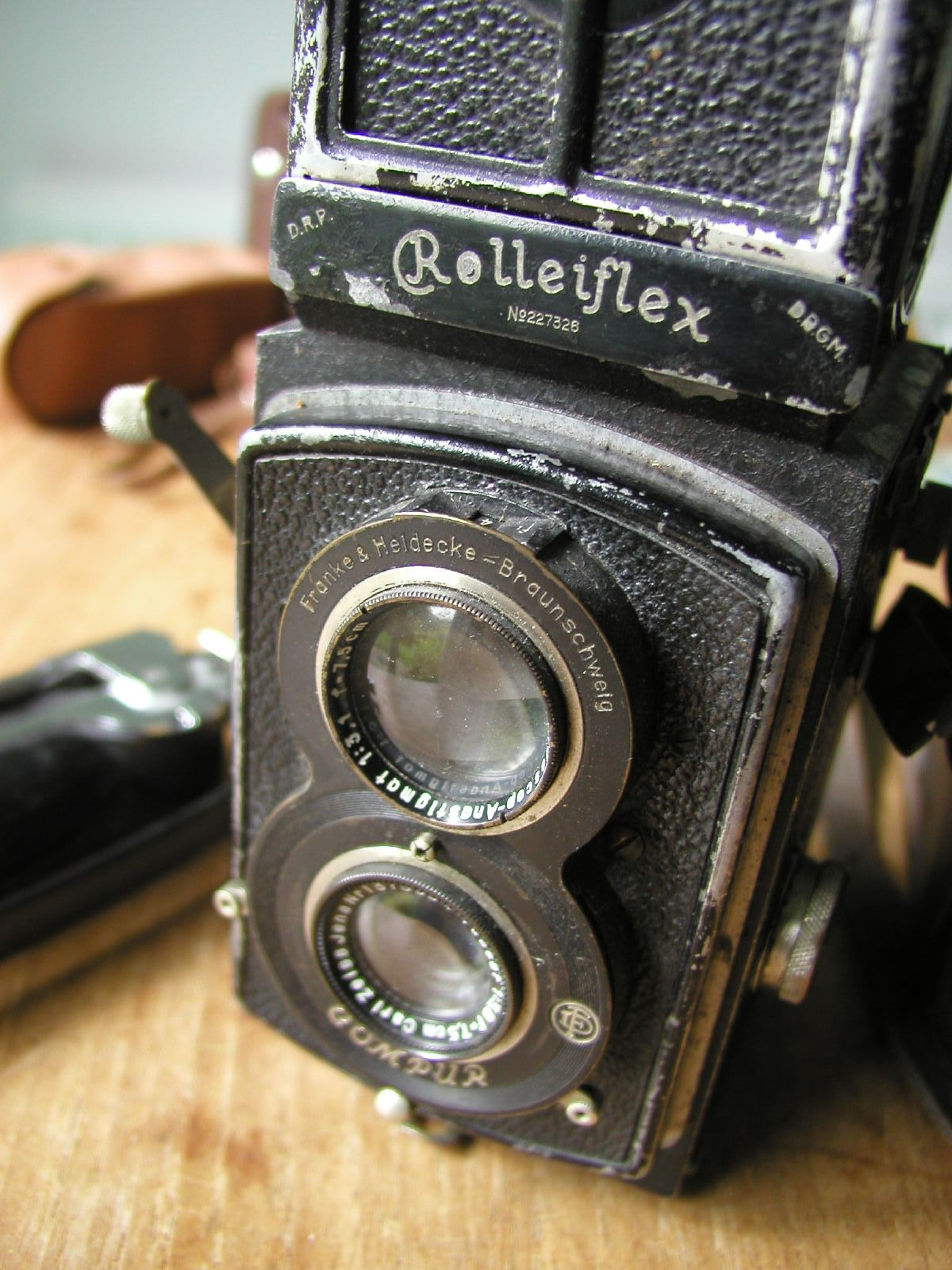
A 1932 Standard Rolleiflex, a type of camera used by Beaton

An exhibition of his works, curated by David Alan Mellor, opened on 16 May 1986 at the Barbican Centre in London, and subsequently travelled to Barcelona and New York. The New York exhibition was held from March to April 1988 and was divided between the Fashion Institute of Technology, whose exhibit focused on Beaton's fashion photography, and the Grey Art Gallery, whose exhibit focused on photographs of his personal life and celebrities.

Major exhibitions have been held at the National Portrait Gallery in London in 1968 and in 2004.

The first international exhibition in thirty years, and first exhibition in Australia of his works, was held in Bendigo, Victoria from 10 December 2005 to 26 March 2006.

In October 2011, the BBC's Antiques Roadshow featured an oil portrait by Beaton of rock star Mick Jagger, whom Beaton met in the 1960s. The painting, originally sold at the Le Fevre Gallery in 1966, was valued for insurance purposes at £30,000.

The Museum of the City of New York dedicated an exhibition to Cecil Beaton from October 2011 to April 2012.

An exhibition celebrating The Queen's Diamond Jubilee and showing portraits of Her Majesty by Cecil Beaton, opened in October 2011 at the Laing Art Gallery in Newcastle-upon-Tyne.

Cecil Beaton: Theatre of War at the Imperial War Museum in London was a major retrospective of Beaton's war photography, held from 6 September 2012 to 1 January 2013.

Cecil Beaton at Home: Ashcombe & Reddish at The Salisbury Museum, Wiltshire, which ran from 23 May to 19 September 2014, was a biographical retrospective focussing on Beaton's two Wiltshire houses, and brought together for the first time many art works and possessions from both eras of Beaton's life. The exhibition included a full-size reproduction of the murals and four-poster bed from the Circus Bedroom at Ashcombe, as well as a section of the drawing room at Reddish House.

Cecil Beaton's Fashionable World at the National Portrait Gallery in London ran from 9 October 2025 to 11 January 2026.

Cecil Beaton's Garden Party ran at The Garden Museum from May to September 2025.

== In popular culture ==
In the 1989 Australian film Darlings of the Gods, Beaton was portrayed by Shane Briant. In the 2010 series Upstairs Downstairs (series 1, episode 3), Beaton was portrayed by Christopher Harper. In Netflix's 2016 series The Crown, Beaton was portrayed by Mark Tandy. In the 2023 film Lee, Beaton was portrayed by Samuel Barnett.

== Publications ==
=== Selected works ===
- The Book of Beauty (Duckworth, 1930)
- Cecil Beaton's Scrapbook (Batsford, 1937)
- Cecil Beaton's New York (Batsford, 1938)
- My Royal Past (Batsford, 1939)
- History Under Fire with James Pope-Hennessy (Batsford, 1941)
- Time Exposure with Peter Quennell (Batsford, 1941)
- Air of Glory (HMSO, 1941)
- Winged Squadrons (Hutchinson, 1942)
- Near East (Batsford, 1943)
- British Photographers (William Collins, 1944)
- Far East (Batsford, 1945)
- Cecil Beaton's Indian Album (Batsford, 1945–6, republished as Indian Diary and Album, OUP, 1991)
- Cecil Beaton's Chinese Album (Batsford, 1945–6)
- India (Thacker & Co., 1945)
- Portrait of New York (Batsford, 1948)
- Ashcombe: The Story of a Fifteen-Year Lease (Batsford, 1949)
- Photobiography (Doubleday & Company, 1951)
- Ballet (Allan Wingate, 1951)
- Persona Grata with Kenneth Tynan (Allan Wingate, 1953)
- The Glass of Fashion (Weidenfeld & Nicolson, 1954)
- It Gives Me Great Pleasure (Weidenfeld & Nicolson, 1956)
- The Face of the World: An International Scrapbook of People and Places (Weidenfeld & Nicolson, 1957)
- Japanese (Weidenfeld & Nicolson, 1959)
- Quail in Aspic: The Life Story of Count Charles Korsetz (Weidenfeld & Nicolson, 1962)
- Images with a preface by Edith Sitwell and an introduction by Christopher Isherwood (Weidenfeld & Nicolson, 1963)
- Royal Portraits with an introduction by Peter Quennell (Weidenfeld & Nicolson, 1963)
- Cecil Beaton's 'Fair Lady' (Weidenfeld & Nicolson, 1964)
- The Best of Beaton with an introduction by Truman Capote (Weidenfeld & Nicolson, 1968)
- My Bolivian Aunt: A Memoir (Weidenfeld & Nicolson, 1971)

=== Diaries ===
- Cecil Beaton's Diaries: 1922–39 The Wandering Years (Weidenfeld & Nicolson, 1961)
- Cecil Beaton's Diaries: 1939–44 The Years Between (Weidenfeld & Nicolson, 1965)
- Cecil Beaton's Diaries: 1944–48 The Happy Years (Weidenfeld & Nicolson, 1972)
- Cecil Beaton's Diaries: 1948–55 The Strenuous Years (Weidenfeld & Nicolson, 1973)
- Cecil Beaton's Diaries: 1955–63 The Restless Years (Weidenfeld & Nicolson, 1976)
- Cecil Beaton's Diaries: 1963–74 The Parting Years (Weidenfeld & Nicolson, 1978)
- Self Portrait with Friends: The Selected Diaries of Cecil Beaton 1926–1974 edited by Richard Buckle (Weidenfeld & Nicolson, 1979)
- The Unexpurgated Beaton: The Cecil Beaton Diaries as they were written with an introduction by Hugo Vickers (Orion, 2003)
- Beaton in the Sixties: More Unexpurgated Diaries with an introduction by Hugo Vickers (Weidenfeld & Nicolson, 2004)

== Notable portrait sessions ==
- Sir William Walton, 1926
- Stephen Tennant, 1927
- Lady Diana Cooper, 1928
- Charles James (designer), 1929
- Lillian Gish, 1929
- Oliver Messel, 1929
- Lord David Cecil, 1930
- Lady Georgia Sitwell, 1930
- Gary Cooper, 1931
- Molly Fink, 1926
- Storm Jameson, 1932
- Pablo Picasso, 1933
- Helen Hope Montgomery Scott, 1933
- Dürrüşehvar Sultan, 1933
- Marlene Dietrich, 1935
- Salvador Dalí, 1936
- Natalie Paley, 1936
- Aldous Huxley, 1936
- Daisy Fellowes, 1937
- Helen of Greece and Denmark, Queen Mother of Romania, 1937
- Lady Ursula Manners, 1937
- Queen Sita Devi of Kapurthala, 1940
- Winston Churchill, 1940
- Graham Sutherland, 1940
- Charles de Gaulle, 1941
- Walter Sickert, 1942
- Maharani Gayatri Devi, Rajmata of Jaipur, 1943
- John Pope-Hennessy, 1945
- Isabel Jeans, 1945
- Greta Garbo, 1946
- Yul Brynner, 1946
- Marlon Brando, 1946
- Princess Fawzia Fuad of Egypt, Queen of Iran
- Vivien Leigh, 1947
- Truman Capote, 1948–1949
- Bobby Henrey, 1948
- Countess Cristiana Brandolini d'Adda, 1951
- Duchess of Windsor, 1951
- Vita Sackville-West, 1952
- Graham Greene, 1953
- Elizabeth II's Coronation, 1953
- Alexis von Rosenberg, Baron de Redé, 1953
- Elizabeth Taylor, 1954
- Grace Kelly, 1954
- Mona von Bismarck, 1955
- Bernard Berenson, 1955
- Joan Crawford, 1956
- Mrs. Charles (Jayne Wrightsman), 1956
- Maria Callas, 1956
- Dame Edith Sitwell, 1956
- Colin Wilson, 1956
- Marilyn Monroe, 1956
- Leslie Caron, 1957
- Dolores Guinness, 1958
- Princess Margaret, Countess of Snowdon, 1960
- Albert Finney, 1961
- Cristóbal Balenciaga, 1962
- Lee Radziwill, 1962
- Karen Blixen, 1962
- Rudolf Nureyev, 1963
- Audrey Hepburn, 1964
- Margot Fonteyn, 1965
- Jacqueline Kennedy, 1965
- Sheridan Hamilton-Temple-Blackwood, 5th Marquess of Dufferin and Ava, 1965
- Jamie Wyeth, 1966
- Georgia O'Keeffe, 1966
- Twiggy, 1967
- Mick Jagger, 1968
- Andy Warhol, 1969
- Katharine Hepburn, 1969
- Barbra Streisand, 1969
- Gloria Guinness, 1970
- Hubert de Givenchy, 1970
- Mae West, 1970
- David Hockney, 1970
- Jane Birkin, 1971
- Marie-Hélène de Rothschild, 1971
- Marisa Berenson as Luisa Casati, 1971
- Jacqueline de Ribes, 1971
- Pauline de Rothschild, 1972
- Tina Chow, 1973
- Gilbert & George, 1974
- Inès de La Fressange, 1978
- Paloma Picasso, 1978
- Caroline of Monaco, 1978
- Dayle Haddon, 1979
