= Smiley baronets =

Baronetcy in the Baronetage of the United Kingdom

Escutcheon of the Smiley baronets of Drumalis and Gallowhill

The Smiley baronetcy, of Drumalis in Larne in the County of Antrim and Gallowhill in Paisley in the County of Renfrew, is a title in the Baronetage of the United Kingdom. It was created on 13 October 1903 for Hugh Smiley, main owner of The Northern Whig. The third Baronet was Vice Lord-Lieutenant of Hampshire between 1973 and 1982.

The family seat, until 1930, was Drumalis House, near Larne, County Antrim.

== Smiley baronets, of Drumalis and Gallowhill (1903) ==
- Sir Hugh Houston Smiley, 1st Baronet (1841–1909)
- Sir John Smiley, 2nd Baronet (1876–1930)
- Sir Hugh Houston Smiley, 3rd Baronet (1905–1990)
- Sir John Philip Smiley, 4th Baronet (born 1934)

The heir apparent is the present holder's son, Christopher Hugh Charles Smiley (born 1968).

Baronetage of the United Kingdom
Preceded by Brooke baronets	Smiley baronets of Drumalis and Gallowhill; 13 October 1903	Succeeded by Knowles baronets
