= Dahesh =

Dahesh may refer to:

- Daheshism, a religion
- Dr. Dahesh, real name Salim Moussa Achi, founder of Daheshism
- Dahesh Museum of Art, a New York museum containing the collection of Dr. Dahesh
