= Cochrane baronets of Woodbrook, Lisgar Castle and Kildare Street (1903) =

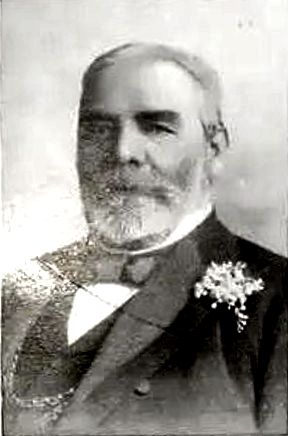
Sir Henry Cochrane, 1st Baronet

The Cochrane baronetcy, of Woodbrook, Old Connaught, near Bray in County Wicklow, Ireland, of Lisgar Castle in Bailieborough in County Cavan, and of Kildare Street in the City of Dublin, was created in the Baronetage of the United Kingdom on 8 October 1903 for Sir Henry Cochrane. He was governing director of Cantrell and Cochrane, mineral water manufacturers, of Dublin, and an alderman of the city.

His second but eldest-surviving son, the 2nd Baronet, was a dramatist under the name Ernest Cecil. He was succeeded by his second son, the 3rd Baronet, in 1952. The 4th Baronet succeeded his father in 1979.

While the baronetcy was created while Ireland was under rule of the British empire, it is illegal in Ireland for "title of nobility or of honour" to be "accepted by any citizen except with the prior approval of the Government", as clarified in Article 40 of the Irish constitution.

== List of baronets ==
- Sir Henry Cochrane, Kt., 1st Baronet (1836–1904)
- Sir Ernest Cecil Cochrane, 2nd Baronet (1873–1952) married four times. His second but only surviving son by his second wife:
- Sir Desmond Oriel Alastair George Weston Cochrane, 3rd Baronet (1918–1979) married to Yvonne Sursock (of the Sursock family), with issue three sons and a daughter.
- Sir (Henry) Marc Sursock Cochrane, 4th Baronet (born 1946) married to Hala es-Said with issue.

The heir apparent is the present holder's elder son Alexander Desmond Sursock Cochrane (born 1973) who is married to Irish-Canadian heiress Alannah Weston (of the Weston family) with two daughters.

== Notes ==
Baronetage of the United Kingdom
Preceded by Dixon baronets	Cochrane baronets of Woodbrook, Lisgar Castle and Kildare Street; 8 October 1903	Succeeded by Murphy baronets
