= Former Presidential Palace of Kantari =

Villa / former presidential residence in Beirut

- القصر الجمهوري السابق في القنطاري
- Alternative names: Qasr Hanna Heneiné, Hanna Heneine Palace, Independence Palace, Beit al-Mustaqbal; Arabic: قصر حنا حنينة, قصر الاستقلال, بيت المستقبل

General information
- Type: Villa / former presidential residence
- Architectural style: Late Ottoman-period Beirut villa
- Location: Kantari, Beirut, Lebanon
- Coordinates: 33.895422°N 35.495603°E
- Completed: 1885

The Former Presidential Palace of Kantari, also known as Qasr Hanna Heneiné (Arabic: قصر حنا حنينة), is a late 19th-century mansion in the Kantari neighborhood of Beirut, Lebanon. From 1943 to 1958 it served as the residence and seat of the first two presidents of independent Lebanon, Bechara El Khoury and Camille Chamoun; it was the first presidential palace of independent Lebanon, before the presidency relocated to Baabda.

== Location ==
The building stands at the corner of Rue Michel Chiha and Rue Abdel-Kader in the Kantari neighborhood of the Minet el-Hosn quarter of Beirut.

== History ==
=== Construction and early ownership ===
According to the architectural historian Ralph Bodenstein, family tradition holds that the house was built in 1885 by Hanna Heneiné, uncle of a better-known local doctor, Joseph Heneiné. (Note: Sources disagree on the exact construction date: Bodenstein (2012) dates the house to 1885, while the American University of Beirut's Beirut's Heritage Buildings guide gives 1870.) Around 1910 the house passed to Derviche Y. Haddad, a Beirut building contractor and building-materials merchant, and later to his daughter Renée Haddad by inheritance; she was married to Fouad Khalil El Khoury, an architect and business partner of her father. The initials of Hanna Heneiné and Derviche Haddad, were visible on the estate's garden gates. The AUB guide corroborates the Haddad ownership, giving 1929 as the year Darwish Yousef Haddad owned the property, and states the El Khoury family acquired it in 1936. For much of the early twentieth century the building was occupied by various relatives and tenants, including Dr. Joseph Heneiné's family until 1936. From the late 1930s, Bechara Khalil El Khoury occupied the upper floor while Tannous Haddad occupied the ground floor.

=== Presidential residence (1943–1958) ===
When Bechara El Khoury became the first president of independent Lebanon in 1943, the entire building came into use as his official residence. His successor, Camille Chamoun (president 1952–1958), continued to use the building, having rented it from the El Khoury family. According to the Lebanese journalist Patricia Khoder, Chamoun considered a rented residence unsuitable for the presidency and commissioned a new palace, which was built on a hillside in Baabda, completed in 1956. The presidency used residences in Sin el-Fil and Jounieh before the Baabda Palace became its permanent, purpose-built seat under President Charles Helou in the 1960s.

=== Later use ===
Sources differ on when the El Khoury family's ownership ended: Bodenstein gives 1986, while the AUB guide states the house was bought by Rafic Hariri in 1985. Michel El Khoury, son of President Bechara El Khoury, lived in the building during the 1960s and 1970s. Hariri had the building renovated to house the headquarters of the Future Movement, and the palace became known as Beit al-Mustaqbal (House of the Future).

== Architecture ==
The house is built as a north-facing central-hall house of two residential storeys under a hipped tile roof, over a vaulted ground floor that was used only for storage and utility. The two upper floors are reached differently: the lower of the two (the first upper floor) has a formal, double-flight open staircase rising from the north façade into a vestibule and the central hall, while the second upper floor is reached instead by a fully enclosed staircase on the building's east side. A further stair at the southeast corner serves the utility wings of both floors. The second upper storey has a rectangular central hall oriented north–south, closed at its north end by a front hall and at its south end by a liwan that projects outward from the building's otherwise cubic massing as a risalit. Both spaces are separated from the central hall by open, triple-arched screens.

Because of the building's width, the side halls flanking the central hall on its north side run transverse to the hall's main axis; each opens onto the central hall but not onto the front hall. One side hall connects, on its east side, to the enclosed staircase and, beyond that, to a utility wing of pantry, servant's room, toilet, and kitchen. The other side hall, by contrast, has its own independent entrance from outside the building, a detail Bodenstein suggests may indicate it originally served as the main reception room (manzul). West of the liwan, a narrow corridor (rather than a further room, as on the east side) leads to what twentieth-century plans record as two bedrooms and a dressing room; Bodenstein interprets this arrangement as an early example of the increasing separation of sleeping quarters in Beirut houses of the following decades. A small arched loggia on the building's west side originally caught the westerly night breeze for the bedroom wing; it was later converted into a bathroom during the French Mandate period.

== See also ==
- Baabda Palace – Residence of the President of Lebanon
- Saint Elias Maronite Church, Kantari – Church in Beirut
- Heneine Palace – Historic mansion in Beirut, Lebanon
- Moussa Sursock Palace – Historic mansion in Beirut, Lebanon
- Ziade Palace – Grand mansion in Beirut, Lebanon

== Bibliography ==
- Bodenstein, Ralph (2012). Villen in Beirut: Wohnkultur und sozialer Wandel 1860–1930. Petersberg: Michael Imhof Verlag. pp. 209–211.
- "Beirut's Heritage Buildings: Minet El Hosn". American University of Beirut Libraries.
- Makarem, May (2022-11-08). "Kantari au temps des présidents Béchara el-Khoury et Camille Chamoun". L'Orient-Le Jour.
- Beirut.com. "The Presidential Palace". Beirut.com.
- Khoder, Patricia (2025-12-28). "The power couple who shaped Lebanon's cultural identity". The Beiruter.
