= Moussa Sursock Palace =

Historic mansion in Beirut, Lebanon

- قصر موسى سرسق (Arabic)
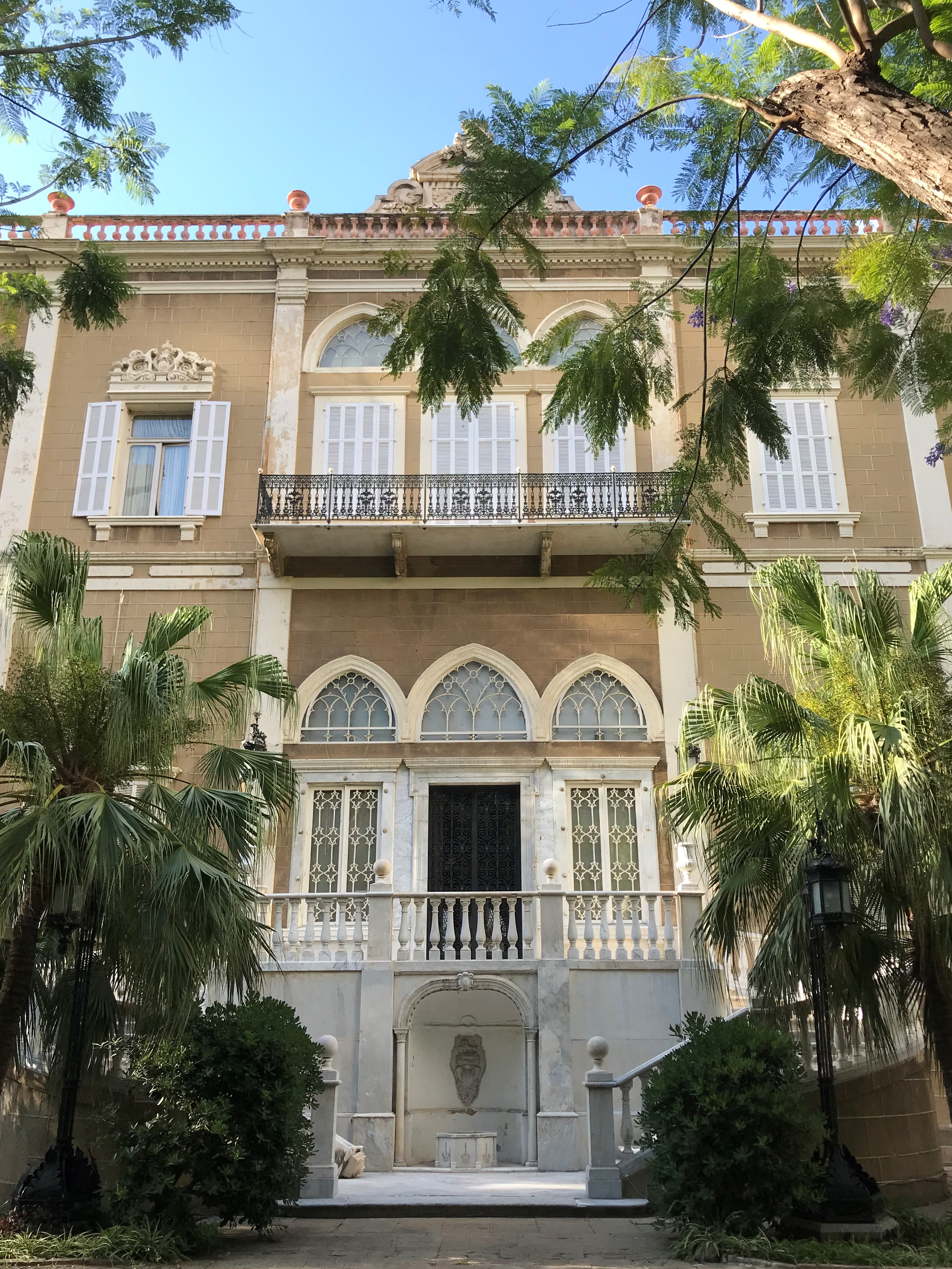
- Main facade of the Qasr Moussa Sursock

- Location within Beirut Location within Lebanon
- 33.893666°N 35.517563°E
- Location: Beirut, Lebanon

History
- Built: Late 1870s
- Built for: Moussa Dimitri Sursock

Site notes
- Architectural style: Italianate Lebanese architecture

The Moussa Sursock Palace (Arabic: قصر موسى سرسق, also known as Sursock Palace) is a historic 19th-century mansion located in the Sursock quarter of Achrafieh, Beirut, Lebanon. Completed in the late 1870s for Moussa Dimitri Sursock, a member of the Sursock family of Beirut, the palace is a large private residence combining Italianate architectural elements with features characteristic of nineteenth-century and traditional Lebanese design. The palace served as the long-time residence of Moussa's granddaughter, Lady Yvonne Sursock Cochrane, until her death in 2020 following the Beirut Port explosion, which caused extensive damage to the property. The palace contains the Sursock family's art collection and archives, including works attributed to Artemisia Gentileschi, Flemish tapestries, family portraits and commercial records.

== History ==
=== Background ===
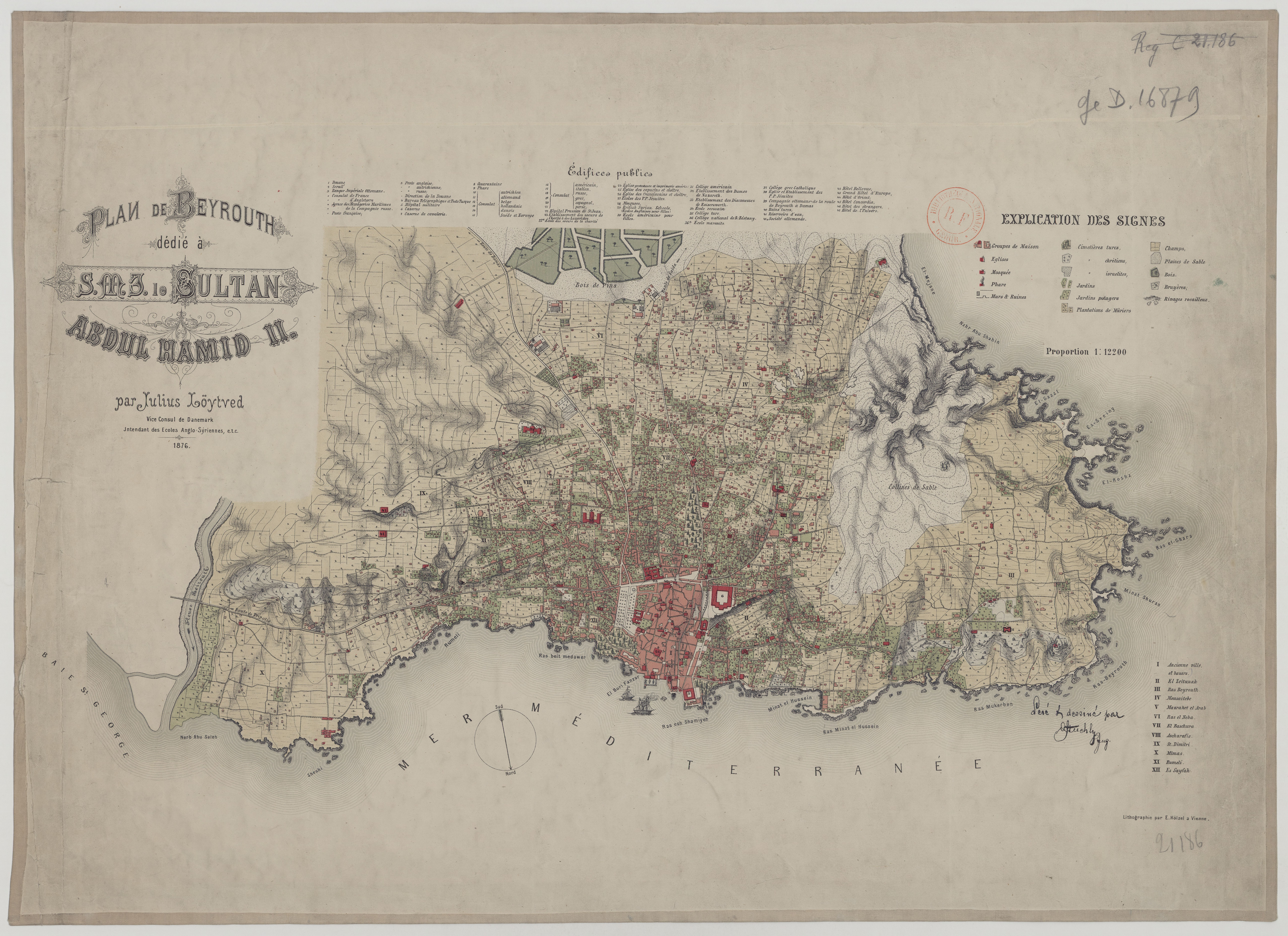
1876 Beirut map by Julius Löytved (Moussa Sursock Palace absent)

The Greek Orthodox Sursock (Sursuq) family's tradition traces their origins to Turkey, though they had long been established near Jbeil (Byblos) before Jabbur Sursock, the family's Beirut progenitor, settled in the city in 1712. By the time of the Egyptian occupation (1832–1840), his grandson Dimitri (or Mitri) Sursock had already made a name for himself as a money-changer and private merchant. Sursock's six surviving sons expanded the family's commercial, financial and landed interests during the nineteenth century. Their fortunes were tied to the Suez Canal, whose construction under the Egyptian khedives Mohamed Sa'id Pasha and Isma'il Pasha they helped finance as bankers. The family was also involved in sericulture and cotton manufacturing and infrastructure, and by the 1890s, their landholdings spanned from Egypt through Palestine into Turkey.

Until the mid-nineteenth century, Dimitri's family lived in the eastern part of the walled city of Beirut, where his descendants would, in the early 1880s, build the Sursock commercial complex (Souk Sursock). All six brothers moved together with their wives and families into a single house to the east of Beirut's old town, in the Mar Niqula (Saint-Nicolas) quarter, the area that would later become the Sursock quarter proper. Once the brothers had returned from Egypt (Lutfallah from Manchester) during the 1870s and 1880s, each built his own villa close to the family's old house and just north of the recently completed park of the Tuéni-Bustros Palace.

=== Construction and later history ===
The villa of Moussa Dimitri Sursock was likely completed in the late 1870s, as it does not appear on the 1876 Julius Löytved plan and its builder died in 1887. Conflicting accounts exist regarding its construction; while some records mention a Lebanese master mason, Sursock's granddaughter, Lady Yvonne Sursock Cochrane, attributes the design and construction to a Turkish master builder. The latter account is regarded as more plausible, though local craftsmen likely executed the masonry. Initially occupied by Moussa Sursock and Anastasie Dagher, the villa was inherited by their son Alfred, an Ottoman diplomat, following Moussa's death in 1887. Alfred's daughter, Yvonne Sursock, married Sir Desmond Cochrane and subsequently inherited the property, and resided in the house until her death on 31 August 2020, less than a month after the 2020 Beirut Port explosion damaged the palace.

== Location ==
The Moussa Sursock Palace is located on Rue Sursock, in the Rmeil district of Beirut. The palace faces the Sursock Museum, a villa from 1912 that was bequeathed to the city of Beirut by Nicolas Sursock and became a museum in 1961.

== Architecture and description ==
The villa of Moussa Sursock is among the largest private residences in Beirut, characterized by a castle-like, feudal appearance. The massive, block-like structure rises two residential storeys above a utility basement, a layout following the precedent of the nearby Qasr Tuéni-Bustros. The facade is distinguished by round towers that flank central projecting bays, including a staircase bay on the west and a utility wing on the east. The house features a two-sided orientation with triple-arch windows on both the southern street-facing entrance and the northern sea-facing garden front. The exposed stone facades are decorated with Italianate profiled cornices, pilasters, and Baroque-style window pediments, topped by an ornamental gable on the street-facing side.

The interior is organized around a "double-T" scheme, with the ground floor serving as the primary reception area and the upper floor housing private family rooms. A defining feature is the exceptionally wide central hall of over 11 m (36 ft), which contains a smaller, inscribed hall at its center. This inner hall communicates with the surrounding ambulatory through open triple-arch screens. The ground floor includes a front hall (diwan-khane) on the northern side that opens onto a garden terrace. The main staircase on the west side is symmetrically arranged with two flights supported by marble columns and iron girders. Unlike typical Beirut houses of the era, the staircase remains open to the central hall through a Serliana arch, architecturally unifying the two floors as a single dwelling. Architectural ornamentation includes Italianate Neo-Baroque and Neo-Rococo stucco ceilings, with the ground-floor central hall featuring an original orientalizing ceiling with geometric interlace and arabesque patterns.

== Holdings ==
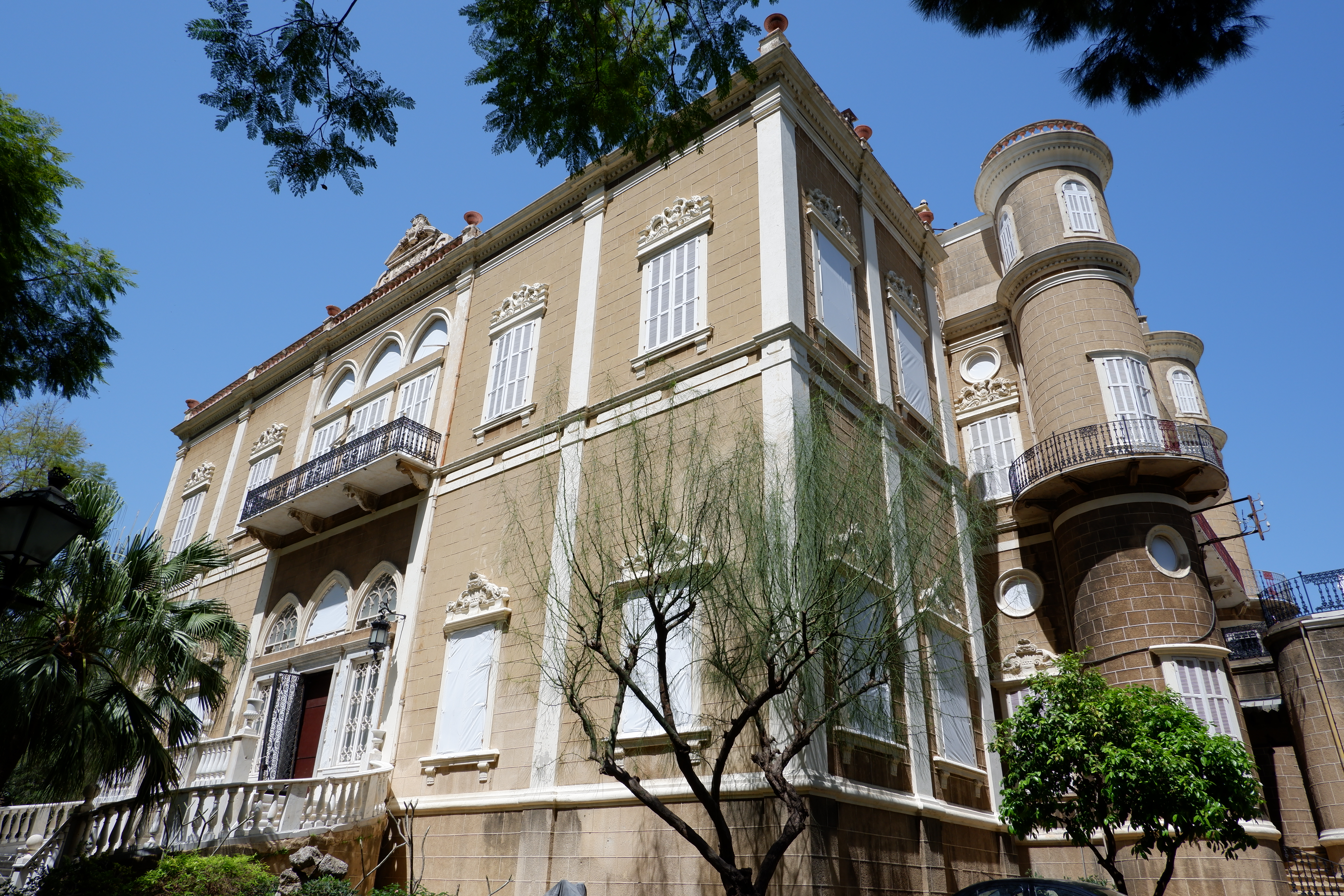
As seen from the palace grounds

The artistic holdings of the Moussa Sursock Palace include a collection of pictures, carpets, and art. The palace houses the painting Hercules and Omphale by Italian artist Artemisia Gentileschi. The Upstairs Hall features a 17th-century Flemish tapestry titled Time cutting the wings of Cupid and sacred Love repelling profane Love, alongside a set of 18th-century Venetian gilt figures of boys holding candelabras. Notable paintings in this area include a portrait of Lady Cochrane by Sutter Robertson and a depiction of Muzio Scevola by Stomer. The library contains a large portrait of Madame Isabelle Sursock by the French painter Gustave Bordes and is paneled in mahogany. The first entrance hall displays a pair of 17th-century Brussels tapestries depicting Cleopatra and Mark Antony. In the central part of the Great Hall, the ceiling is an example of Lebanese plasterwork, and the painted furniture was specifically designed for the house with decorations that mirror the ceiling's design. Additionally, the palace houses 18th-century paneling salvaged from the Donna Maria Sursock residence in Sawfar.

The halls of the Sursock Palace contain the family's archives, divided into three categories (public, private, and commercial-accounting), primarily for the years 1876 to 1978. They record the activities of Alfred, Moussa, Nicolas, Princess Isabelle, Lady Yvonne Cochrane and other members of the family.

== See also ==
- Former Presidential Palace of Kantari – Villa / former presidential residence in Beirut
- Heneine Palace – Historic mansion in Beirut, Lebanon
- Ziade Palace – Grand mansion in Beirut, Lebanon
