= Ziade Palace =

Grand mansion in Beirut, Lebanon

- قصر زياده (Arabic)
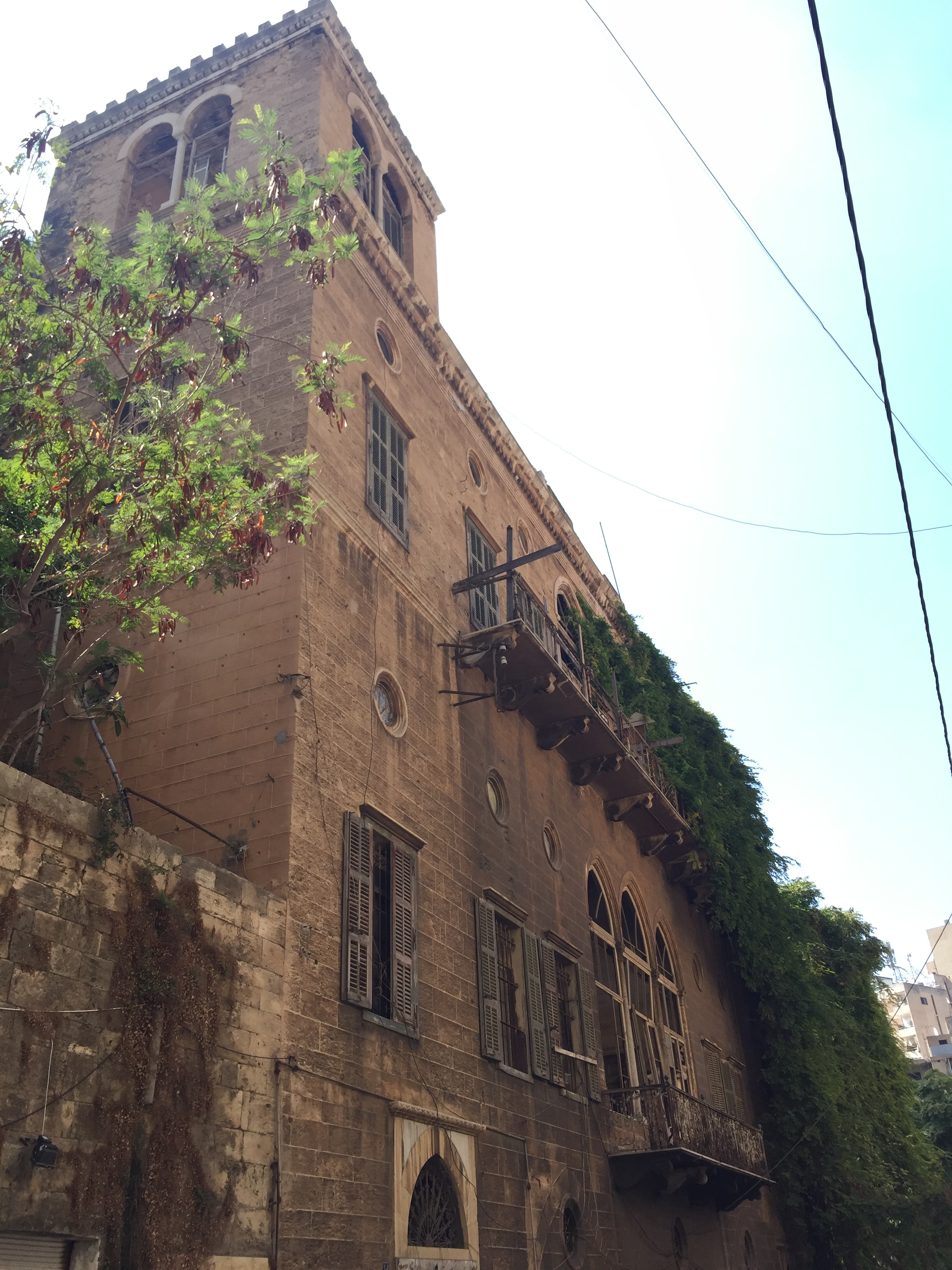
- Side view of the Ziade palace

- Location within Beirut Location within Lebanon
- 33.894137°N 35.496379°E
- Location: Beirut, Lebanon

History
- Built: 1860

Site notes
- Architect: "Altina"
- Architectural style: Lebanese architecture

The Ziade Palace (Arabic: قصر زيادة, romanized: Qasr Ziade, lit. 'Ziade Palace') is a 19th-century mansion located in Beirut's Zokak el-Blat quarter.

== History ==
The identity of the patron who commissioned the mansion in 1860 is not documented. It was designed by an Italian architect known only as Altina. It was purchased ten years later by Youssef Nasr, a wealthy Lebanese expatriate in England. In 1930, the mansion was bought by the Ziade brothers; Joseph, a physician and Louis, a lawyer and president of the Aleppo bar association. The Ziades were related to the then Maronite archbishop of Beirut Ignatius Ziade and to the renowned feminist poet, writer and essayist May Ziade. May suffered severe depression for years after the loss of both her parents, and Khalil Gibran, with whom she maintained an close written correspondence. In 1938, Joseph persuaded May, who was then living in Egypt, to return to Beirut and stay with the family. She arrived the following year but was soon committed to the 'Asfourieh mental hospital in Hazmieh. Joseph subsequently sought control of her estate on the grounds that she was unable to manage her affairs. May later returned to Cairo, where she died on 17 October 1941. The house was occupied by the Ziades until the beginning of the Lebanese civil war in 1975. The mansion was pillaged and occupied by militias during the conflict.

== Location ==
Qasr Ziadé stands in the Beirut quarter of Zuqaq el-Blat, on the southeast intersection of Rue Abdel-Kader and Hussein Beyhum streets; the mansion's western facade faces Selim Bustani street. The mansion occupies parcels ZAB 614 and 615. Historically, as of the 1870s, it occupied the Zuqaq el-Blat’s western edge, and, before the development of the neighborhood, overlooked the dunes that once stretched towards Ras Beirut. These dunes, referred to as ar-Raml or Ramlat az-Zarif, prevented suburban development west and south until around the early 20th century. In the 19th century, the neighborhood was an upscale residential area with villas of wealthy merchants and notables amid large garden plots. To the North, the mansion's main facade opened towards the Qantari neighborhood and to the Minet el-Hosn bay. The road skirting the western walled garden of the mansion was named after Beirut's sand hills, Tariq ar-Raml (meaning the sand road, later renamed Abdel-Kader street) follows the course of the flat valley rising from north to south. 19th-century maps, such as Löytved’s plan of 1876, confirm its presence and show surrounding gardens and its small outbuildings.

== Architecture and description ==
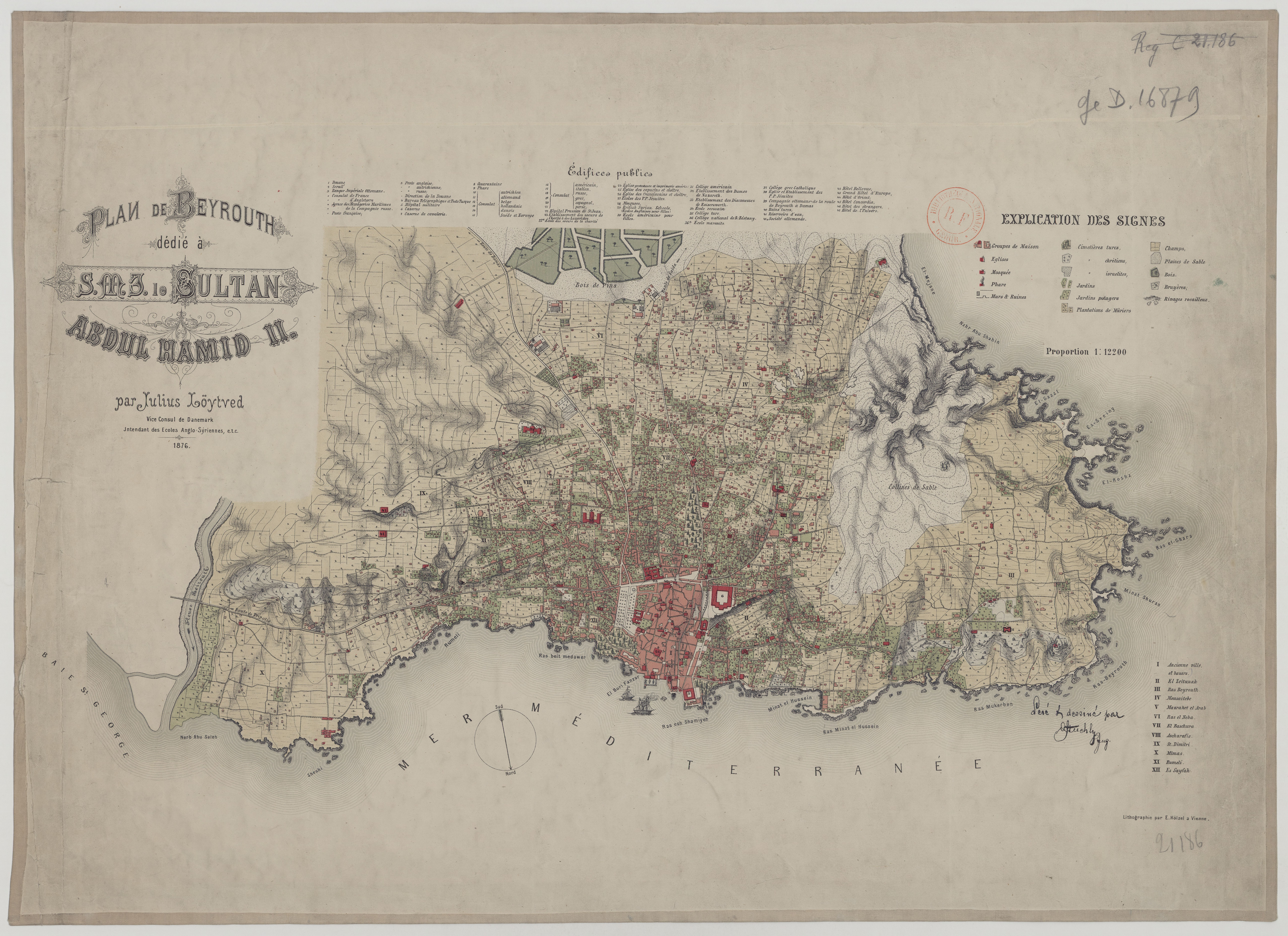
1876 Julius Löytved map of Beirut.

Qasr Ziadé is described as a "suburban middle-hall house" with a two-sided arcaded gallery. It comprises three stories: two residential floors built above a vaulted substructure. The ground floor contains several vaulted rooms opening onto the street; these were historically used as stables and for storage. Another vaulted space in the southwest corner connects to both the south and west gardens. The ground floor vault configuration compensates for the sloping terrain. The walls and vaults are made of sandstone ashlar masonry with plastered interiors, the walls have an average thickness of about 30 cm. A hipped Marseille-tiled roof covers the central mass of the house, while the surrounding areas and the service wing are topped with flat mortar roofs. The two main residential levels each feature a central hall (Arabic: دار, romanized: dar). To the north side, these halls open into a three-arch arcade. The other rooms stand around this central zone, with two larger side halls to the north and smaller secondary rooms around the perimeter. A liwan extends south from the central hall, flanked by two interior windows and a central door.

On the outside, the north facade has nearly symmetrical exposed sandstone masonry; it comprises two rectangular portals, each with pointed arch lunette, that sit at the edges of the ground floor. Between them, three carriage doors with oculi above fill the remaining space. The upper floors each have a prominent triple-arch arcade with a balcony; slender columns support pointed arches, and marble slabs form the balcony floors with cast- or wrought iron railings. Flanking windows are tall and rectangular, with small oculi overhead. The roof features twin tower-like masyafs (Note: In Levantine architecture, a masyaf refers to a type of rooftop structure or shelter commonly found in traditional homes across the Levant. It is typically an open-sided structure, designed to provide shade and ventilation during hot weather. The masyaf serves as a functional and social space where families can gather, sleep, or relax during the summer months.) at each corner, there is a pair of arched windows with three open sides and a crenellated parapet. A parapet extends across the center, where a decorative gable once stood.

The residence is surrounded by three distinct garden segments: a lower square garden on the west side, another square garden to the south adjacent to a small bakehouse, and an elongated rectangular garden on the east side. The latter is partially bounded by a single-story sandstone building formerly containing an outhouse, firewood storage, and a chicken coop. A now-blocked external staircase once ascended from the street into the garden.

== Conservation status ==
In 2010, the Ziade mansion along with other 19th century mansions were protected by a ministerial decree by then culture minister Salim Wardeh. The Lebanese Ministry of Culture listed the Ziade palace on the General National Heritage Inventory List, officially recognizing its historical significance and preventing any alterations or demolition. The decision followed concerns over the deteriorating condition of the buildings, including fire damage and water infiltration, which threatened their structural integrity. The listing was prompted by the National Heritage Committee’s efforts during a cultural heritage event in May 2009, which revealed restricted access to the palaces. The listing imposes restrictions on modifications, ensuring that any restorations preserve the palaces’ historical and architectural integrity under the supervision of the Lebanese Directorate General of Antiquities. The classification also allows owners to request state assistance for restoration work.

== See also ==
- Heneine Palace – Historic mansion in Beirut, Lebanon
- Former Presidential Palace of Kantari – Villa / former presidential residence in Beirut

== Bibliography ==
- Abi Akl, May Abboud (25 June 2010). "وزير الثقافة يوقف هدم 5 بيوت تراثية" [The Minister of Culture Halts the Demolition of 5 Heritage Houses]. Centre Catholique d'Information (in Arabic). An-Nahar. Archived from the original on 7 November 2014.
- Aljarida staff (24 May 2010). "منطقة زقاق البلاط في بيروت... بابل الثقافات العمرانية" [Zoqaq al-Blatt Area in Beirut... A Babylon of Architectural Cultures] (in Arabic). Aljarida. Archived from the original on 6 November 2014.
- As-Safir (2 May 2010). "جولة في زقاق البلاط: من الأبجدية إلى النهضة". archive.assafir.com (in Arabic). Archived from the original on 22 February 2025.
- Bajali, Joanne Farshakh (9 July 2010). "هكذا أُنقذ قصرا حنينة وزيادة في بيروت" [This is how the Hanineh and Ziade palaces were saved in Beirut]. Al-Akhbar (in Arabic). Archived from the original on 6 November 2014.
- Bodenstein, Ralph (2012). Villen in Beirut: Wohnkultur und sozialer Wandel 1860-1930 (in German). Michael Imhof Verlag. ISBN 9783865685278.
- Bureau technique des villes Libanaises (2008). "Beirut Pilot Project Study" (PDF). MED-PACT Program - Archimedes project. Beirut Municipality. Archived from the original (PDF) on 1 February 2014.
- Dayeh, Jean (January 26, 2011). "ستة زائد واحد ... من أبنية بيروت العتيقة" (in Arabic). Fikr-mag.com.
- Khader, Lubna (1999). "Previously Featured Life of a Woman:May Ziade". Lebanese Women's Association. Archived from the original on 2007-04-18.
- Ibrahim, Sami; Lamy, Sébastien (2009). "من الأبجدية إلى النهضة - زقاق البلاط: دروب و شخصيات" (PDF). Académie Libanaise des Beaux Arts. Archived from the original (PDF) on 13 August 2019.
- La Revue du Liban staff (1999). "May Ziade: Temoin authentique de son époque" [May Ziade: A True Witness of Her Time]. La Revue du Liban staff (in French). La Revue du Liban. Archived from the original on 2017-06-25.
- LBC staff (November 11, 2011). "منازل بيروت التراثية مهددة بالزوال....فمن يحمي ذاكرتها؟". LBC (in Arabic). LBCI group. Archived from the original on March 4, 2016.
- Lebanese University - Faculty of Law (2010). "إدخال العقارين رقم 614 و622 من منطقة زقاق البلاط العقارية محافظة بيروت في لائحة الجرد العام للأبنية التاريخية" [Inclusion of properties number 614 and 622 from the Zokak El-Blat district, Beirut Governorate, in the general inventory list of historic buildings]. 77.42.251.205 (in Arabic). Archived from the original on 1 August 2024.
- Mneimneh, Suheil; Itany, Ziad Samy (2021). "عائلة+زيادة" المعالم التراثية في المناطق البيروتية [Heritage landmarks in the Beirut area]. Beirut: Beirut Heritage Society. pp. 8–9.
- Singh-Bartlett, Warren (2014). "Beit Ziade". A Magazine.
