= Heneine Palace =

Historic mansion in Beirut, Lebanon

Qasr Heneine
- قصر حنينة
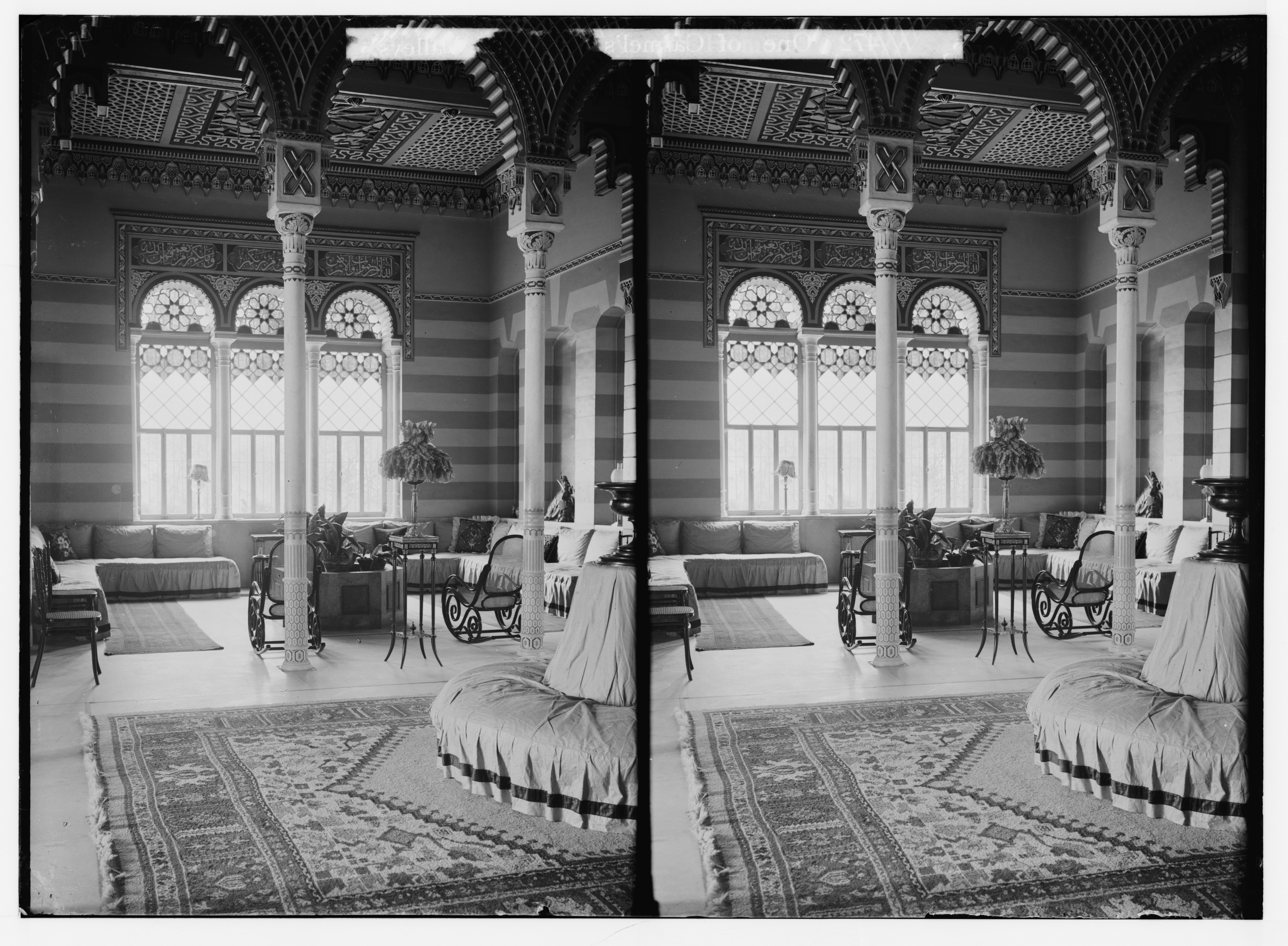
- Qasr Heneine's "Oriental Room" in 1900

General information
- Status: Partially preserved
- Architectural style: Ottoman, Lebanese vernacular
- Location: Zokak al-Blat, Beirut, Lebanon
- Coordinates: 33.8944°N 35.4961°E
- Year built: 1880s
- Owner: Constantin Podhorski, Mezher family, various subsequent owners and residents

Qasr Heneine (Arabic: قصر حنينة), also referred to as the Hneineh Palace or Mezher Palace, is a historic residence in the Zokak al-Blat quarter of Beirut, Lebanon. The palace was built in the 1880s; originally commissioned by a Russian nobleman, the palace housed various institutions and notable figures, including the US Consulate General, the Lebanese artist Marie Chiha Haddad, and the Lebanese philosopher and magician Dr. Dahesh. Although it is a listed heritage site, the palace has suffered from prolonged neglect and was nearly demolished in 2011.

== History ==
=== Construction and early residents ===
Qasr Heneine was built in the 1880s, a period when Beirut's bourgeoisie sought residences in the expanding suburban districts like Zokak al-Blat. The original builder of Qasr Heneine was a Russian nobleman, identified as Count or Prince Constantin Podhorski. After his death around the turn of the century, the palace was acquired by the Salloum Mezher, a member of a family of hoteliers and landowners. From 1903 to 1914, it was leased to the French physician Justin Calmette. Between 1914 and 1936, the ground floor served as the office for the US Consulate General, while the upper floor was the Consul General's residence, with a brief interruption during World War I when it was temporarily occupied by the Dutch Consulate.

After the US Consulate departed in 1936, Joseph Heneine (Yūsuf Ḥunayna), a Lebanese physician, and his wife Marie Mezher, who had inherited the property, moved into the first floor, where Joseph opened his private medical practice. Marie Heneine briefly operated a French restaurant, "Le Petit Palais", in the house from 1969 until her death in 1970. The second floor was rented to Georges Haddad and his wife Marie Chiha Haddad, a painter and writer who hosted artists and intellectuals at her salon during the 1930s and 1940s. From the 1940s, the Haddad residence also became the center for the Daheshists, a religious-spiritual group founded by Dr. Dahesh (Arabic: سليم العشي, romanized: Salīm al-ʿAššī), who resided with the family. Consequently, the house is still known to some as Qasr Dahesh (Dahesh Palace).

=== Preservation and status ===
During the Lebanese Civil War (1975–1990), the Haddad family and Dr. Dahesh emigrated to the United States; a caretaker remained on the second floor. The first floor, vacant after Marie Heneine's death in 1970, was occupied by refugees from around 1976 until 2005. In 2011, the palace faced a demolition order, which was halted "in extremis" due to the intervention of heritage activists, notably the Save Beirut Heritage movement. Due to its deteriorating condition and threats from urban development, the Heneine Palace was placed on the World Monuments Fund (WMF) 2016 Watch list of endangered sites.

== Location ==
Qasr Heneine is situated on at the intersection of Rue Hussein Beyhum and Rue Abdel-Kader in Zokak al-Blat. The construction of the multi-lane Avenue Fouad Chéhab in the late 1960s and early 1970s cut through the northern part of the property and removed the former Rue Tewfik Bassat, exposing the palace's once quiet, garden-facing northern facade.

== Architecture and description ==
The building is a closed, cubic structure with an almost square footprint of around 25 m × 26 m (82 ft × 85 ft), encompassing a ground area of 705 m^{2} (7,590 sq ft) per floor. It features two main residential floors above a low substructure. The house is positioned close to the southern and western street boundaries, leaving an L-shaped garden to the north and east.

The façades of Qasr Heneiné are built of Beirut sandstone and are fully plastered. The elevations are articulated by a base cornice, an intermediate stringcourse, and a roof cornice. The building is covered by a low-pitched hipped roof clad in tiles. The northern façade differs from the standard arrangement found in many late nineteenth-century Beirut houses. Instead of a large triple-arched opening associated with a central hall, it is organised around a comparatively small triple window overlooking the garden. The remainder of the façade consists largely of rectangular windows fitted with shutters, while a series of oculi is built into the upper part of the wall. The western elevation, facing Rue Abdel-Kader, includes a gallery at first-floor level and a terrace above. At its southern end projects an entrance risalit (protruding section of the building) containing the principal doorway. Above the entrance is a triple-arched opening carried on masonry piers rather than the slender marble columns commonly associated with Beirut domestic architecture of the period. The southern façade is composed primarily of regularly arranged rectangular windows. It contains both a secondary entrance to the first floor and the entrance to the stair hall. Smaller openings correspond to service and sanitary spaces located behind the façade. On the eastern side, a two-storey gallery extends across much of the façade. The lower arcade is formed by masonry piers carrying pointed arches, whereas the upper level employs slender marble columns.

While the exterior of Qasr Heneine largely adheres to local building traditions, its internal spatial organization is considered rare for late 19th-century Beirut. The main entrance on the western, street-facing side leads directly into a tall entrance hall that spans the height of the substructure and the first floor, originally featuring a marble fountain. A two-armed stone staircase opposite the entrance ascends to a vestibule on the first floor, which acts as a central distributor to other rooms. A T-shaped grand hall, known as the "Oriental Room", occupies the northern side of the first floor. Its orientalist decoration includes carved woodwork and painted ceilings. It features three wings, each opening through triple-arch arcades into the central area.

== See also ==
- Grand Serail of Beirut
- Petit Serail – Administrative building in Ottoman Beirut, destroyed in 1951
- Pine Residence – Historical building and French embassy headquarters in Beirut, Lebanon
- Ziade Palace – Grand mansion in Beirut, Lebanon
