= FitzGerald baronets of Geraldine Place (1903) =

Dormant baronetcy in Ireland

Escutcheon of the FitzGerald baronets of Geraldine Place

The FitzGerald baronetcy, of Geraldine Place in St Finn Barr in the County of Cork, was created in the Baronetage of the United Kingdom on 10 October 1903 for Edward FitzGerald, Lord Mayor of Cork in 1901, 1902 and 1903.

The baronetcy is now dormant. The presumed 3rd Baronet did not use the title and never successfully proved his succession, and was consequently never on the Official Roll of the Baronetage. His younger brother the presumed 4th Baronet (who was a Roman Catholic priest) did not use the title either and also did not successfully prove his succession.

== FitzGerald baronets, of Geraldine Place (1903) ==
- Sir Edward Fitzgerald, 1st Baronet (1846–1927)
- Sir John Joseph Fitzgerald, 2nd Baronet (1876–1957)
- Edward Thomas Fitzgerald, presumed 3rd Baronet (1912–1988), did not use the title.
- Daniel Patrick Fitzgerald, presumed 4th Baronet (1916–2016), Catholic priest, name did not appear on the Official Roll.
- Sir Andrew Peter FitzGerald, presumed 5th Baronet (born 1950), name does not appear on the Official Roll.

== Notes ==
Baronetage of the United Kingdom
Preceded by Murphy baronets	FitzGerald baronets of Geraldine Place; 10 October 1903	Succeeded by Brooke baronets
