= Murphy baronets of Altadore (1903) =

Escutcheon of the Murphy baronets of Altadore

The Murphy baronetcy, of Altadore in the parish of Booterstown in the County of Dublin, was created in the Baronetage of the United Kingdom on 9 October 1903 for the businessman Sir James Murphy. He was President of the Dublin Chamber of Commerce, Chairman of the Royal Bank of Ireland, and a shipowner. The title became extinct on his death in 1922.

== Murphy baronets, of Altadore (1903) ==
- Sir James Joseph Murphy, 1st Baronet (1843–1922)

== Notes ==
Baronetage of the United Kingdom
Preceded by Cochrane baronets	Murphy baronets of Altadore; 9 October 1903	Succeeded by FitzGerald baronets
