= Nicolas Sursock =

Lebanese art collector (1875–1952)

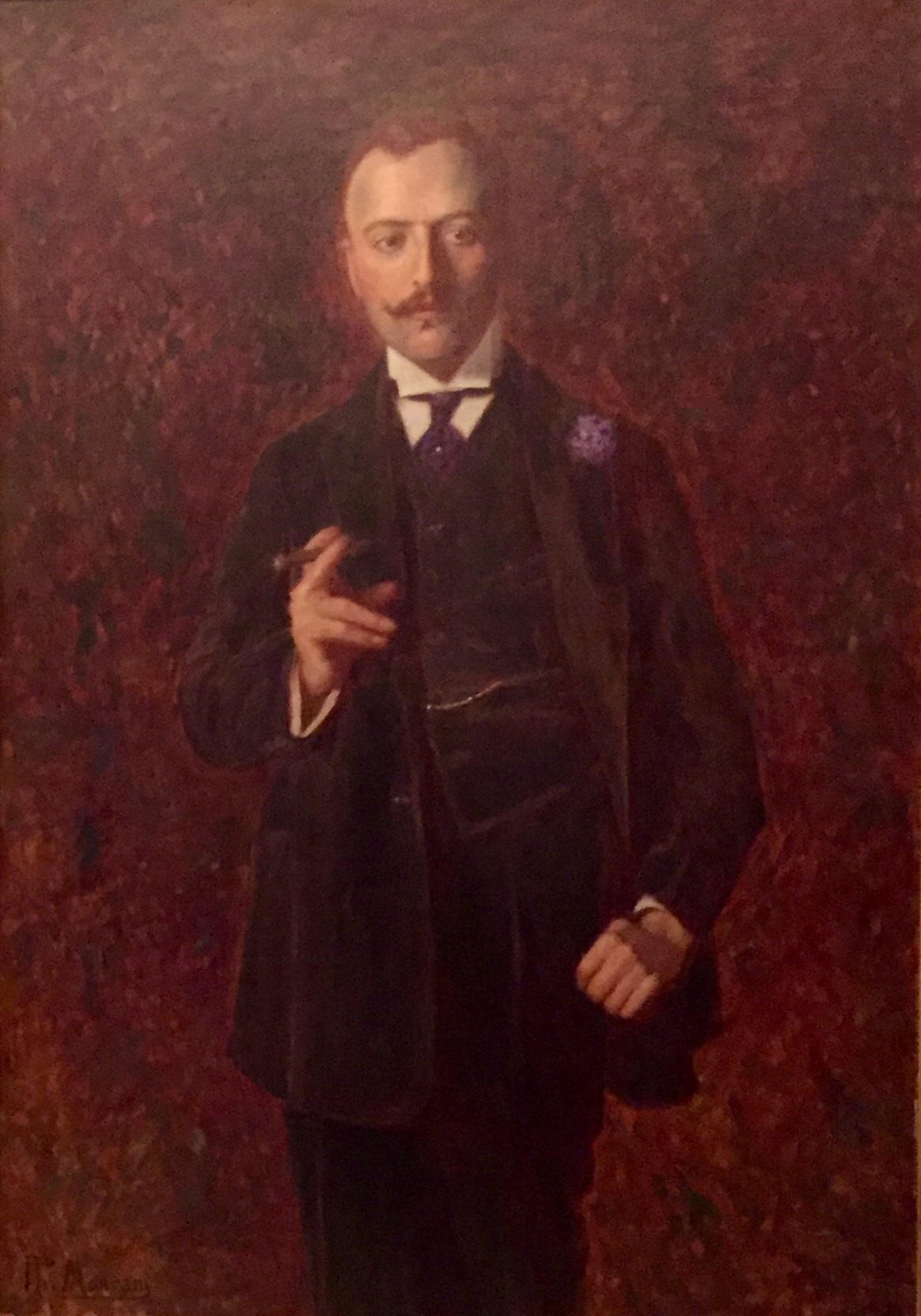
- Portrait of Sursock by Philippe Mourani, Nicolas Sursock Museum.
- Born: 1875
- Died: 1952 (aged 76–77)
- Noble family: Sursock family
- Occupation: Art collector

Nicolas Sursock (1875–1952) was a Lebanese art collector and a prominent member of the Sursock family, one of the old aristocratic families of Beirut.

== Legacy ==
Nicolas Sursock died in 1952 and is probably best known for bequeathing his private villa to the city of Beirut, to be transformed into a museum of modern art. The villa is now known as the Nicolas Sursock Museum.

Last Will and Testament

"As I love fine arts and long for their expansion, particularly in my homeland, Lebanon, as I wish this country would receive a substantial part of fine arts, and my fellow citizens would appreciate art and develop an artistic instinct, for this purpose that I pursue and that I can only be beneficial and contribute to Lebanon's development, I wish there would exist in Beirut, capital of the Republic of Lebanon, museums and exhibition rooms open to everyone, where master-pieces and antiques would be preserved and displayed.

"…I therefore set up in the form of waqf (mortmain) all of the real estate and its contents form a museum for arts, ancient and modern, coming from the territory of the Republic of Lebanon, the other Arab countries or elsewhere, as well as a room where the Lebanese artists' works shall be exhibited. It being understood that this museum shall remain eternally and perpetually (…)"

— Nicolas Sursock

== See also ==
- Rue Sursock
- Sursock House
