= Sursock family =

Greek Orthodox Christian family in Beirut

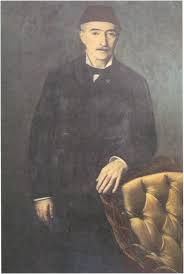
Khalil Sursock, 1882

The Sursock family (also spelled Sursuq) is a Greek Orthodox Christian family from Lebanon, and was once an important family of Beirut. Having originated in Constantinople during the Byzantine Empire, the family has lived in Beirut since 1712, when their forefather Jabbour Aoun (who later adopted the family name Sursock) left the village of Berbara. After the beginning of the 19th century, they began to establish positions of power within the Ottoman Empire. The family, through lucrative business ventures, political maneuvering, and strategic marriages, embarked on what Leila Fawaz called "the most spectacular social climb of the nineteenth century", and, at their peak, had a network of relations to the families of Egyptian, French, Irish, Russian, Italian and German aristocracies, alongside a manufacturing and distribution empire across the Mediterranean.

== Overview ==
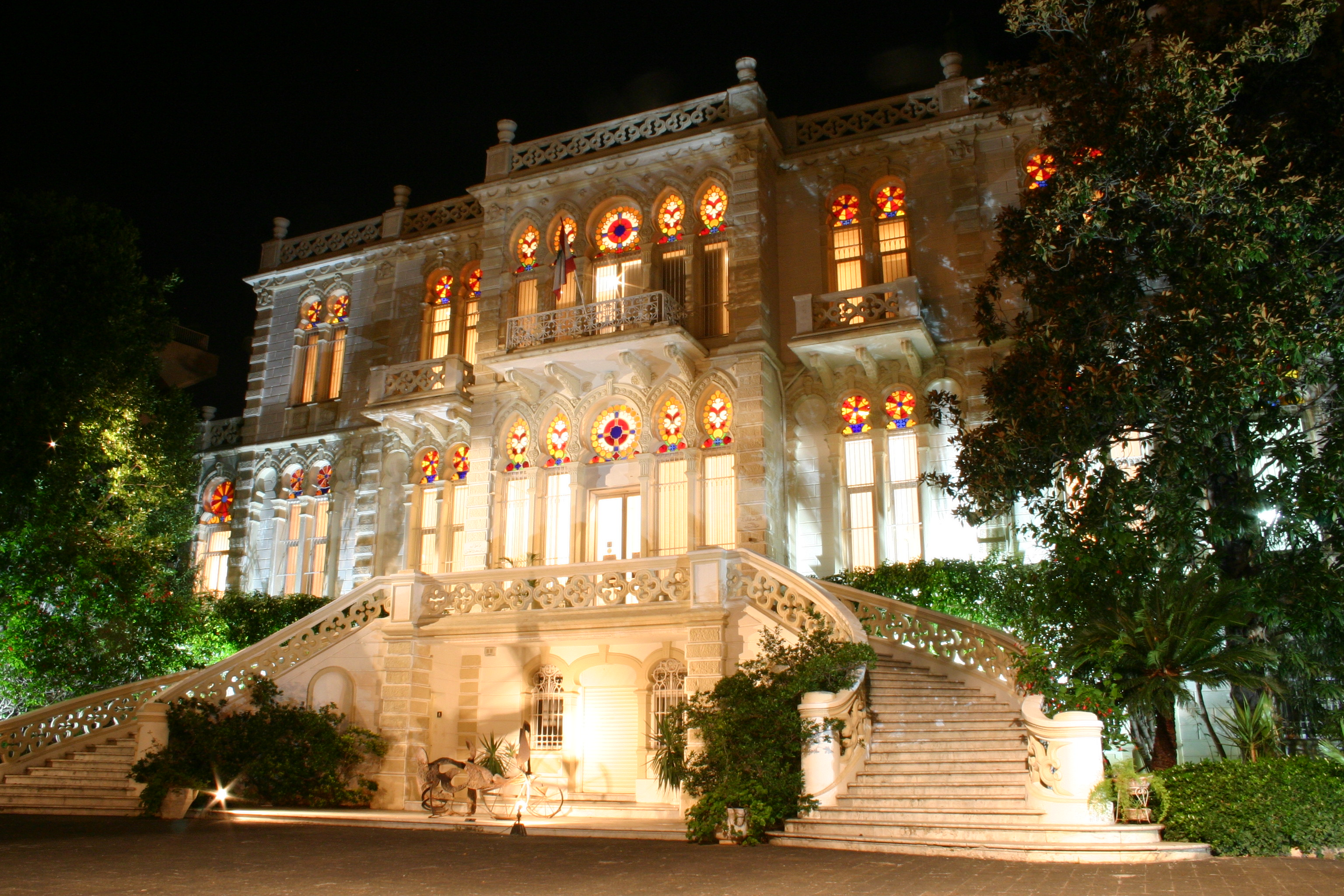
Sursock Museum in Beirut, Lebanon

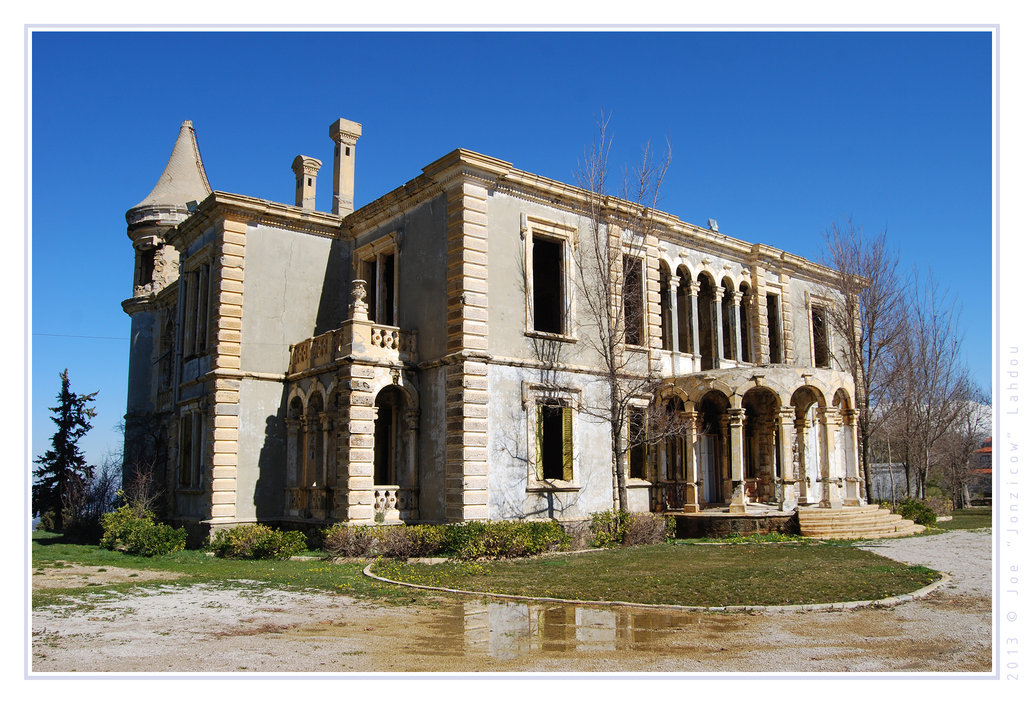
Sursock Villa

The Sursocks were one of Beirut's aristocratic Christian families that moved in Ottoman, Egyptian and European high societies. The Sursocks were part of an international bourgeoisie centered in Alexandria, Beirut, Cairo, Constantinople, Paris and Rome, and one of the "Seven Families" in Beirut's aristocratic nobility. Their wealth and sophistication are also reflected in their residences, equal in elegance to any Italian palazzo, which remained largely unscathed despite fifteen years of mortar fire and violence during the Lebanese Civil War.

In the 17th century, members of the Sursock family served as tax collectors and held other key positions on behalf of the Ottoman Empire. As a result, they benefitted greatly from the 1858 Ottoman land reforms, during which they acquired large tracts of fertile land in Palestine and Syria, in addition to extensive holdings from Egypt to Beirut. The means by which they came into possession of such real estate were multiple. As a long line of land owners and tax collectors, the Sursocks were able to leverage their finances and capital using their connections to American, Russian, German and French consuls over the decades to establish extensive economic and political connections. The family developed wide social ties and was close to key Ottoman and European figures, frequently playing host to a wide range of royals and diplomats, including King Abdul Aziz of Saudi Arabia, German Emperor William I, Turkish Sultan Abdul Hamid II and Emperor Franz Joseph of Austria, amongst other monarchs.

The Sursocks built their fortune through their manufacturing and transportation empire, which extended from Turkey to Egypt and the United Kingdom.

Dimitri Sursock was the founder of Sursock and Brothers, a prominent firm in nineteenth-century Beirut which acted as an agent for Lascaridi and Company in the 1850s and 1860s and shipped grain to London, Cyprus and throughout Europe. The firm and its assets were taken over by his sons after his death: Nicolas, Moussa, Loutfallah, Khalil, Ibrahim and Joseph.

In addition to their manufacturing and export activities, the family increased its fortune as landowners in the Ottoman Levant, amassing profits from both rent and tax collection, as well as from the sale of property. Based in Beirut, the family owned many properties in the Mediterranean region, including in Mersin, Turkey, where an area with many of their shops and properties became known as the Sursock Quarter of the city. Their financial activities were wide-ranging, and included shipping and the production of silk and other goods built for transport to London and throughout the region.

The Sursocks also became heavily involved in banking in Egypt and Lebanon, where they helped finance major projects including the Suez Canal, the Beirut-Damascus highway, and the Beirut Harbour Company. They were also direct creditors to Ismail Pasha and other members of Egyptian royalty, who soon found themselves heavily involved with and indebted to the family. As a result of these financial activities, the family was branded "the Rothschilds of the East", and indeed engaged the Rothschild banking family during their sale of the Jezreel Valley to the Jewish National Fund in 1906. The Sursocks are recorded as having been involved in Freemasonry at the time, under the Grand Orient of France, with many speculating on the reasons behind the family's rise. George Dimitri Sursock, Worshipful Master of the Grand Orient lodge, recorded his extensive dealings with, and on behalf of, the Freemasons.

Members of the family also gained notoriety for taking advantage of the famine in Lebanon during the First World War by selling overpriced basic food supplies, and for selling large swaths of Arab land in Palestine to Jewish settlers, who often demanded forceful eviction of the residents.

In the wake of the Lebanese Civil War many members of the family relocated to various European and Asian capitals, but Yvonne, Lady Cochrane remained in Beirut. Despite the vast damage to Beirut during the conflict, the main Sursock residence lies untouched alongside buildings whose outer walls bear scars caused by years of violence.

== History ==
For many decades, the Sursocks were Lebanon's leading business family. As business partners of the Otis Elevator Company, they were successful industrialists and played a key role in the development and manufacturing of elevators.

The Sursocks have shaped Lebanon's history from the late Ottoman period to present; indeed, the selection of Beirut, which would come to be known as the 'Pearl of the Orient,' as the provincial capital was in no small part the result of their entreaties to the Porte.

According to Lady Cochrane, daughter of Alfred Sursock, the name is a corruption of Κυριε Ισαακ ("Kyrie Isaac", meaning Lord Isaac). The family left Constantinople at its fall in 1453 and settled near Byblos. Other sources list the name as having been derived from the Arabic phrases for "secrets" and "market". Near the close of the 18th century the Sursock family moved to Beirut, where they became successful traders, exporting grain from the eastern Mediterranean to the United Kingdom, whilst also importing textiles from Europe to be sold in the Middle East. Nicolas Sursock founded the Banque Sursock et Frères in 1858 and purchased extensive property in different parts of the Ottoman Empire.

The Sursocks soon became protégés and dragomen to numerous European and American consuls-general and were afforded political privileges and protection by the various countries with whom they had ties, including Russia, Germany, Greece, Ireland and the United States of America. Moussa Sursock, the 8th Duke of Cassano, his brothers and his father Alfred are reported to have travelled on Greek and Russian passports as well as to have gained protégé status with other European consulates in Beirut as a result of their wide-ranging activities. Furthermore, the Sursocks' heavy involvement in Egyptian affairs allowed the family to form close relations with members of the monarchy including Khedive Sa'id of Egypt, who reigned from 1854 to 1863, and his nephew Isma'il Pasha (1863–1879), affording them preferential deals on large infrastructural projects and extravagant public works.

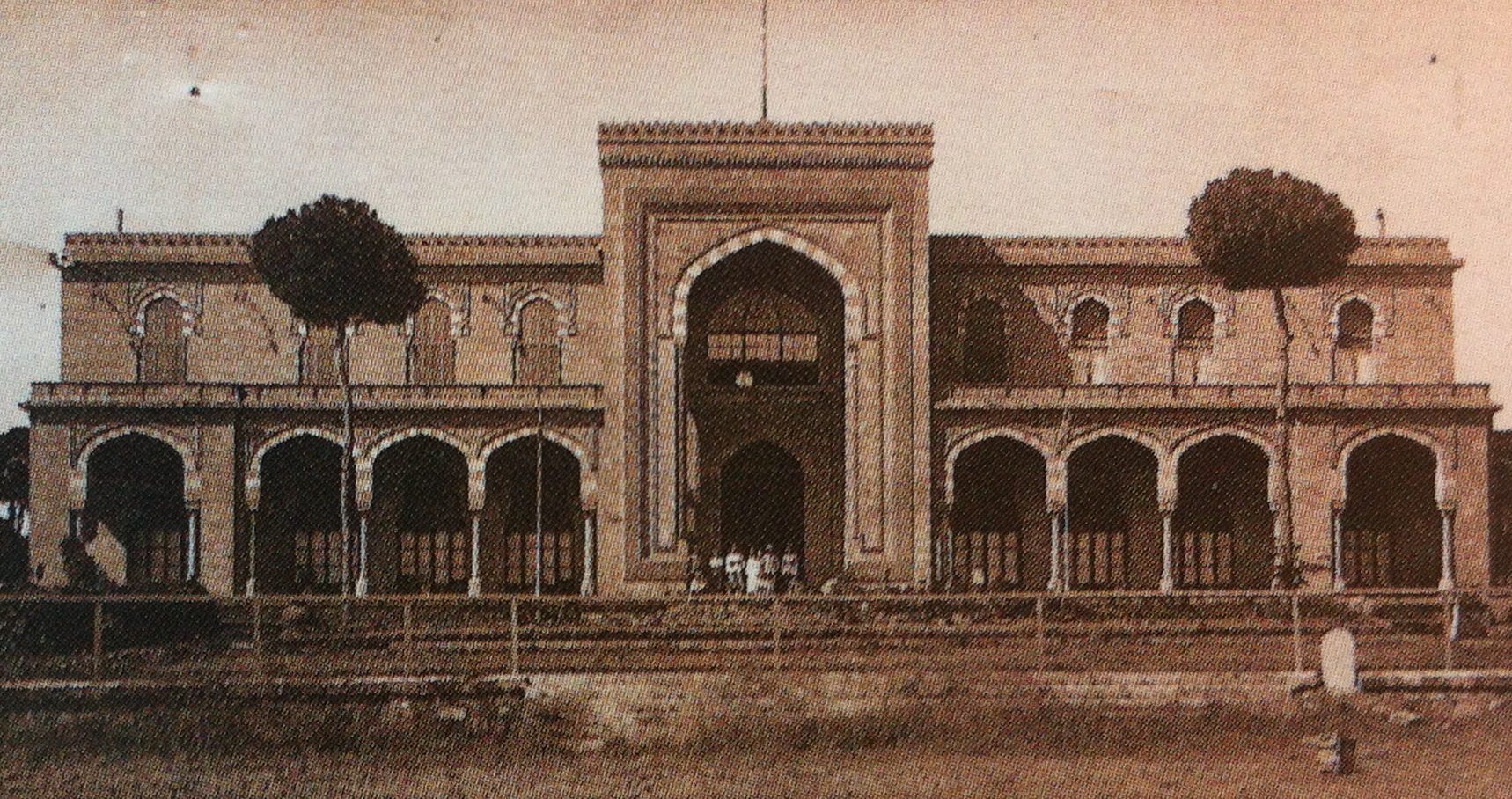
Alfred Sursock's Pine Residence

The Sursocks' success was measured by their admission to the highest circles of both the Ottoman and European elite political spheres. They formed close connections with officials in Constantinople, while aristocrats often approached them to intercede on their behalf with the Ottoman government. One sign of their intimacy with the sources of Ottoman power was the appointment of Alfred Sursock to the post of secretary at the Ottoman embassy in Paris in 1905, who then joined Moussa, Michel and Yusuf Sursock in taking seats within the Ottoman power structure. In addition to connections with Paris, a French report written the following year listed Moussa Sursock as dragoman of the German Consul, and a year later, Mathilde Sursock married Alberto Theodoli, the Italian president of the League of Nations Permanent Mandates Commission, in Paris, thereby extending the family's reach around the Mediterranean. Further evidence of the Sursocks' influence can be found in the court accounts recorded under Russian Grand Duke Nicolai Nikolaevich, identifying Nicolas Sursock, who had long maintained a strong relationship with the court, as an "Honorary Dragoman" of Russia.

Alfred, meanwhile, moved throughout the titled circles of Europe and married Maria Teresa Serra di Cassano, daughter of Francesco Serra, 7th Duke of Cassano, who came from an old Italian princely family from Naples. Their daughter Yvonne was known as Lady Cochrane after marrying Desmond Cochrane, with whom she had four children.

Michel Sursock, a deputy to the Ottoman parliament, became infamous during the great famine in the First World War for hoarding grain and speculating on the supply. He would not sell the grain, which cost 40 piastres in peacetime, for less than 250 piastres.

=== Land sales to early Zionist settlement ===
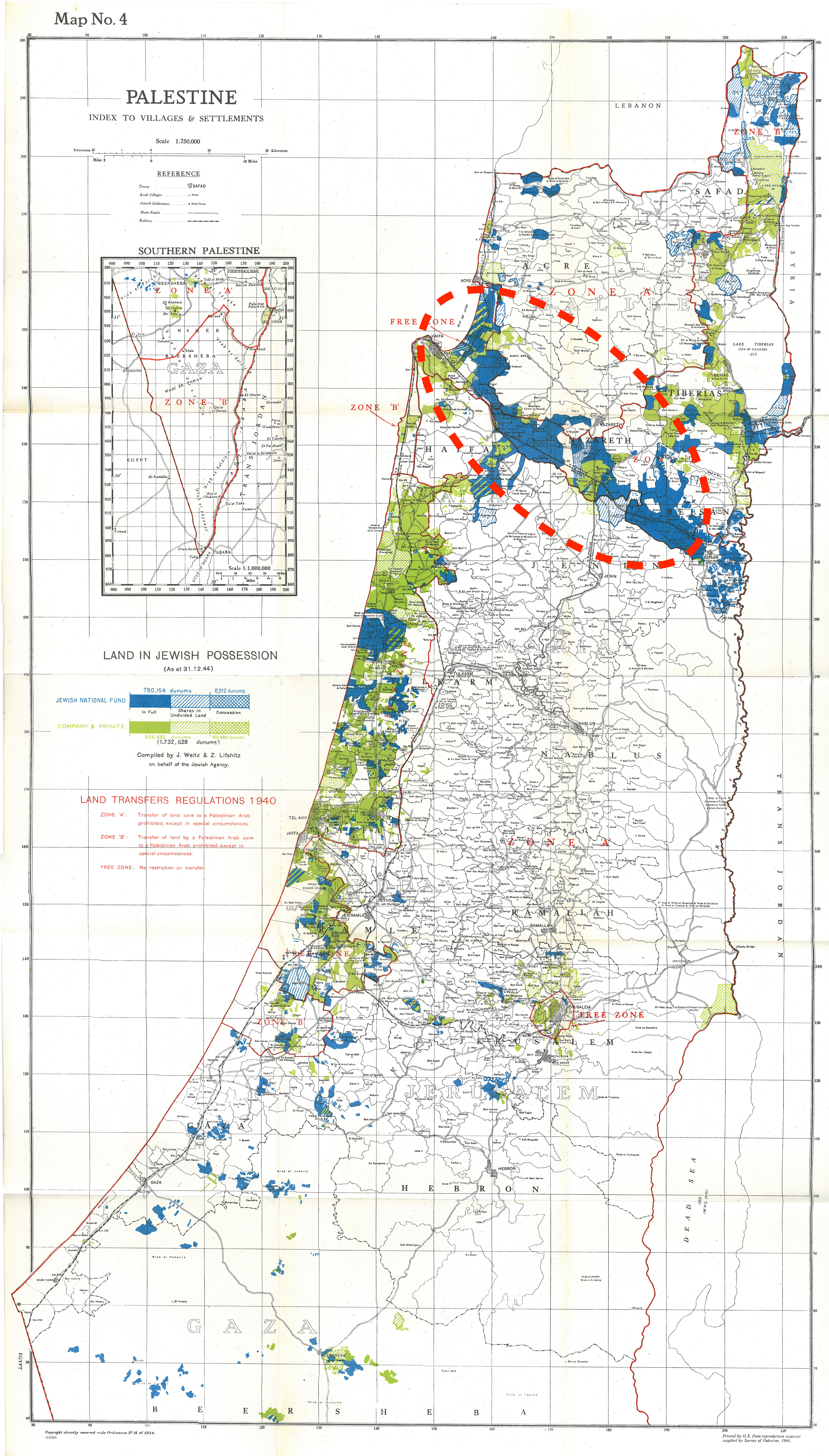
The Sursock Purchases (see red dotted circle) illustrated on a map of Jewish land purchase in Palestine as at 1944; the dark blue represents land then owned by the Jewish National Fund, of which most in the circled area had been acquired under the Sursock Purchases.

The family owned more than 90,000 acres, or 400,000 dunams, (364 km^{2}) in the Jezreel Valley in Palestine, having purchased it from Ottoman authorities in their dealings with the empire. Evidence of the remarkable concentration of wealth accumulated by the Sursocks, who already owned tens of thousands of acres of the finest land in the region, can be found in records detailing their sustained purchases of numerous new villages every year.

In 1872, the Ottoman Government sold Marj ibn Amir (Esdraelon Valley) to the Sursock family of Beirut. The Zionists began to show interest in buying the Jezreel Valley in 1891, but the Palestine Land Development Company (PLDC), a Zionist land purchasing agency, made its first purchases in 1910. In 1897, Theodor Herzl writes about the Sursock family in his diary, noting the onset of negotiations with the Jewish Colonisation Organization for the purchase of 97 villages in Palestine.

In ancient times Esdraelon was the granary, and regarded as the most fertile tract of Palestine. The Sursocks were absentee landlords in the vast Marj Ibn `Amer (Jezreel Valley) in Northern Palestine. The Jewish National Fund was founded in 1901 by funding from the Baron to buy and develop land in Ottoman Palestine for Jewish settlement. The PLDC acquired land for the Jewish National Fund (JNF). Official purchasing organizations such as the Palestine Land Development Company focused on consummating the transfer of some 65,000 dunams of land in the Jezreel Valley owned by the Sursocks. On 18 December 1918, the PDLC concluded an agreement with Nagib and Albert Sursock for the purchase of 71,356 dunams in the Jezreel Valley, including Tel Adashim. The Ottomans tried to limit mass land acquisition and immigration, but had their hands tied by European pressure and also corruption and greed of officials and large landowners. The sale of land in Marj ibn Amer is a noted case. Hankin of the KKL transacted the final settlement of purchase in 1921. Hankin originally worked for the PLDC and then became the main land speculator for both agencies.

Under the British Mandate, the land laws were rewritten, and the Palestinian farmers in the region were deemed tenant farmers by the British authorities. Because the villagers paid tithes to the Sursock family in Beirut for the right to work the agricultural lands in the villages, they were deemed tenant farmers by the British Mandate authorities in Palestine, and the right of the Sursock family to sell the land to the JNF was upheld by the authorities. In the face of local opposition, the right of the Sursocks to sell the land and displace its population was upheld by the authorities. A number of purchased villages, particularly those in the Jezreel Valley, were inhabited by tenants of land who were displaced following the sale. The buyers demanded the existing population be relocated and as a result, the Palestinian Arab tenant farmers were evicted, with some receiving compensation the buyers were not required to pay under the new British Mandate law. Although they were not legally owed any compensation, the evicted tenants (1,746 Arab farmer families comprising 8,730 persons in the largest group of purchases), were compensated with $17 per person (approx. $300 in 2024 dollars).

== Assets ==
=== Regions ===
When Moussa Sursock died in 1888, his share of the Sursock family assets was divided amongst his brothers, nephews, wife, three sons and five daughters. Those assets included a wide range of real estate: in and around Beirut; in Mersin, Turkey; in Tartus, Syria; and in Alexandria, Egypt – which gave the heirs significant influence in the region. Moussa also passed on extensive rural holdings, including entire villages in Egypt and Palestine, and land on Mount Lebanon including a chateau that became the fashionable resort of Sofar.

=== Alfred Sursock villa in Sofar ===
The Sursock villa in Sofar, constructed in the early twentieth century by Alfred Sursock for his wife Maria, bears original foundation inscriptions that proclaim the wealth of these merchants-turned-aristocrats. Though the family often adopted the style and manners of the French and other Europeans, these Arabic inscriptions are reminders of an Ottoman alliance stretching back centuries.

=== Moussa Sursock Palace and Rue Sursock, Beirut ===
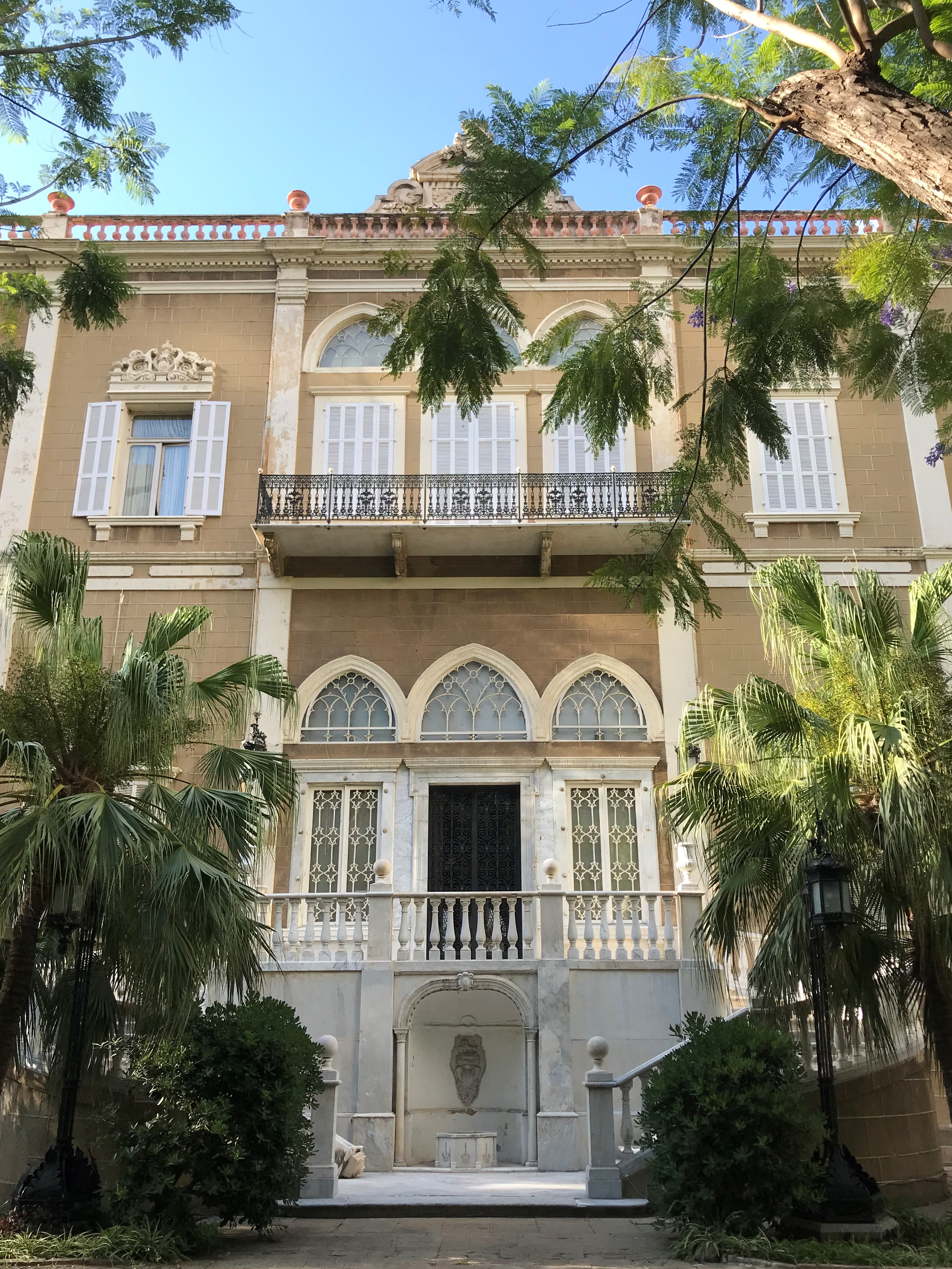
Moussa Sursock Palace in Beirut, Lebanon

Rue Sursock, in the Achrafieh district of Beirut, is named after the family, which owned and continues to own palatial homes on the street, such as Sursock House. Yvonne, Lady Cochrane, who in 1946 married Desmond Cochrane, was the owner of the Sursock House, as well as other property along Rue Sursock, up to the fashionable Rue Gouraud. Nicolas Sursock transformed the house into a museum of art and amassed a large collection of art and glass. But it was Lady Cochrane's father, Alfred Sursock, who initially expanded the size of the palace gardens and contributed most to the collections of art, carpets and other exquisite items, which are amongst the finest and best preserved in the Middle East. The palace is also home to a large collection of Italian artwork from the 16th and 17th centuries, many contemporary Lebanese pieces and antique Lebanese jewellery.

=== Nicolas Sursock villa in Beirut (museum) ===
Nicolas Sursock built himself a spectacular private villa in 1912 and specified in his will that it be transformed into a museum after his death. Thus, when he died in 1952 the villa was bequeathed to the city of Beirut. It is an exceptional, pearl white structure at the top of a hill in Beirut's luxurious Achrafieh neighbourhood, with echoes of both Venetian architecture and Ottoman architecture. The Sursock Museum collection consists of 5,000 pieces, including paintings, sculptures, ceramics, glassware, and iconography, of the 18th, 19th, and 20th centuries. The museum underwent extensive renovation led by French architect Jean-Michel Wilmotte and Lebanese architect Jacques Aboukhaled.

=== Beirut Hippodrome and casinos ===
In 1918, the Sursock family financed the building of the Beirut Hippodrome. Alfred Sursock, who funded the endeavor, agreed to a deal with the city of Beirut regarding the development of 600,000 square meters in Beirut's pine forest. The Hippodrome project was to include a public causeway, a movie theater and a casino in addition to the hippodrome itself. The hippodrome complex was ultimately built in 1921, with the casino eventually becoming the seat of the French Mandate Authorities in Lebanon. The Sursocks had also previously built Lebanon's first casino, the Sawfar Grand Hotel, in the late 1880s.

=== Jezreel Valley Railway ===
In 1882, a consortium headed by the Sursock family won an Ottoman concession for the construction of a railway across the Jezreel Valley. The family sought to build a railway there both to raise land value around the line, which was mostly family-owned, and to enjoy economies of scale in the transport of goods from the Hauran, also owned by the family, to the Mediterranean Sea for export. In 1883, Sir Laurence Oliphant founded a company along with Gottlieb Schumacher, one of the founders of the German Colony of Haifa, to find investors for attaining a construction permit for the Sursock family, and capital for the construction itself. On June 13, 1883, early surveying work was completed and Oliphant began to look for investors, both in Britain and Germany. In a letter he wrote to the Duke of Sutherland, Oliphant claimed that the construction of the line was extremely important both politically and economically, that it would eventually serve as the connection between Asia Minor, the Fertile Crescent, and Egypt, and expressed fear that the line would be under sole German ownership. Oliphant and his peers advertised the line as extremely profitable for investors, estimating the gain at 34%, and promising additional permits to construct additional extensions, a modern port in Haifa or Acre, and a shipping company. For that purpose, Oliphant purchased additional lands on Haifa's coast, and in the Megiddo area. Despite these efforts, the plans failed — the British government, the only one interested in the project, sent the Duke of Sutherland to inspect it, who refused to help sponsor the project. The Lebanese families headed by Mr. Sursock, who wished to build the railway for their personal needs, instead saw their permit and subsequent deposit with Sultan Abdul Hamid II expire two years later.

== Members ==
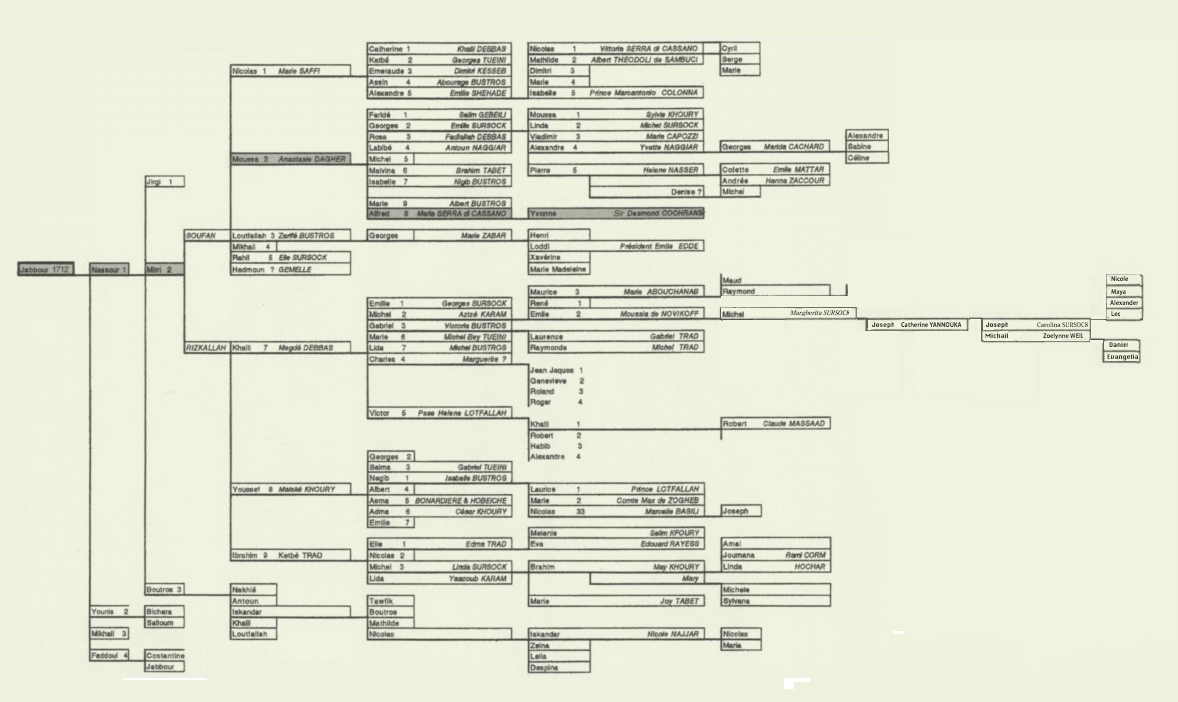
Sursock lineage since 1712

Michel Sursock was a high-ranking member of Ottoman parliament and a senior dragoman to the Persian Empire, having been granted the title "Senator of the Empire". Moussa, Michel-Ibrahim and Yusuf Sursock all served as members of the Ottoman parliament for a number of years, beginning in 1912.

Girgi Dimitri Sursock (1852–1913) married Marie Assad Zahar and was dragoman at the German General Consulate in Beirut. He was decorated with the Order of Osmanieh. He published several books, including Tarikh al-Yunan and Kitab al-ta'lim al-adabi. He was in contact with many intellectuals of al-Nahda, but also with foreign scientists, including the orientalist Martin Hartmann. He was for many years the Worshipful Master of "Le Liban" lodge of Freemasons in Beirut.

George Moussa Sursock had developed close ties with a wide variety of rulers and members of Europe's monarchy, from Franz Joseph of Austria to William of Germany and Louis Prince of Battenberg. Moussa was also involved in Freemasonry, as is evidenced in archives and letters addressed to the Grand Orient in Paris, dated April 1906, as well as in other sources such as "Les Grandes Familles".

Alfred Sursock married Maria Teresa Serra, daughter of Francesco Serra, 7th Duke of Cassano. His daughter Yvonne married the British aristocrat Desmond Cochrane and became known as Lady Cochrane. Alfred's first cousin once removed, Nicolas, married his wife's younger sister Vittoria. Nicolas's eldest sister Mathilde married Alberto Theodoli, and his youngest sister Isabelle married Prince Marcantonio Colonna, the head of the ancient Colonna family of Rome.

Catherine Aleya Beriketti Sursock, who was born in Alexandria, Egypt in 1938 and was formerly the wife of Cyril Sursock (son of Nicolas Sursock and Vittoria Serra), married Prince Sadruddin Aga Khan in November 1972 in the British West Indies. The prince's marriage to Catherine brought with it three sons: Alexandre Sursock, Marc Sursock and Nicolas Sursock.

Alexandre Sursock, son of Cyril Sursock, married Princess Mom Rajawongse Charuvan Rangsit of Thailand (by Mom Nalini) on 9 September 1978.

Michail (Michael) Sursock is a leading figure in Asia's private equity and financial sphere, where he continues to serve as an adviser to numerous companies, having built his name as a leader of several multinational businesses across Europe, America and Asia. Michail has spent time as CEO of KKR Capstone for Asia Pacific, as a managing director at Motorola, and as a president with Mars. Michail is an advisor and speaker at the Tuck School of Leadership Dartmouth and a member of its Asia Advisory Board. He is also a member of the Marshall Goldsmith Leadership 100.

Robert Sursock, over many decades, established himself as a premier banker in Paris and beyond, having built and grown such institutions as PrimeCorp Finance, Gazprombank Invest Mena and Banque Arabe et Internationale d'Investissement.

Nicha Sursock, the co-owner of the restaurant and bar "L'aubergine" in Cairo, is also a member of the family, and Cici Tommaseo Sursock was a renowned artist who exhibited throughout the world, including in Lausanne, Beirut, Cairo, New York, and Rome.

Isabelle Hélène Sursock married Prince Marcantonio VII Colonna and moved to Italy, where she was able to integrate successfully into Roman high society. She subsequently remained a prominent figure throughout the Mussolini era. After the end of the monarchy in 1946 Princess Isabelle effectively replaced Queen Marie José as the substitute queen of Italy, hosting regal receptions where royalty, aristocracy and, among the bourgeoisie, only financiers and bankers were allowed. Isabelle was among the élite of Roman society throughout her long life up to the 1980s. She guarded the artistic collection of the family through both world wars. She and her husband were staunchly loyal to the Holy See, so much so that she was given the rare honor of Vatican citizenship.

The "alternate queen", as she was known in Italy's elite circles, never abandoned her palace (Palazzo Colonna), which she loved, and continued to use her diplomatic skills at the highest level, receiving heads of state and royalty from half the world. Isabelle dedicated her life to preserving the interests and image of the family.

== Archives ==
The halls of the Sursock Palace contain the family's archives, divided into three categories (public, private, and commercial-accounting), primarily for the years 1876 to 1978. They record the activities of Alfred, Moussa, Nicolas, Princess Isabelle, Lady Cochrane and other members of the family.

An extensive study of the archives and the family itself can be found in Lorenzo Trombetta's 'The Private Archive of the Sursocks (Sursuqs), A Beirut Family of Christian Notables: An Early Investigation'.

== See also ==
- Sursock bronze – Roman-era bronze statuette

== Bibliography ==
- Trombetta, Lorenzo (2009). "The Private Archive of the Sursuqs, a Beirut Family of Christian Notables: An Early Investigation". Rivista degli studi orientali, Nuova Serie. 82, Fasc. 1/4 (1/4): 197–228. JSTOR 41913265.
