= Yvonne, Lady Cochrane =

Lebanese philanthropist (1922–2020)

- Born: Yvonne Sursock; 18 May 1922; Naples, Italy
- Died: 31 August 2020 (aged 98); Beirut, Lebanon
- Occupations: Philanthropist, social figure, activist
- Spouse: Sir Desmond Cochrane, 3rd Baronet

Yvonne, Lady Cochrane (née Sursock; 18 May 1922 – 31 August 2020) was a Lebanese philanthropist, advocate of the arts and member of the Sursock family. She died on 31 August 2020, from injuries sustained in the Beirut explosion on 4 August 2020.

== Personal life ==
Yvonne Sursock was born on 18 May 1922, in Naples, Italy. She was the only daughter of Alfred Sursock, a Lebanese aristocrat, and Maria Theresa Serra di Cassano, the daughter of Francesco Serra, 7th Duke of Cassano. Her father owned thousands of tracts of land which included much of Jezreel Valley, the Western Galilee, Haifa, and Jaffa.

She studied at Les Oiseaux in Paris as well as in southern England, and was fluent in Italian, French, and Lebanese Arabic. In 1946, she married Desmond Cochrane. When her husband's father died, the couple inherited the Woodbrook estate outside of Bray, County Wicklow, Ireland, and moved into the home in 1952. They had three sons and a daughter. The couple separated in the 1960s, and Desmond moved to Cyprus where he died in 1979.

After her family sold much of the land to the newly formed Israel, she retained some properties and land in the territory and embarked on a long legal battle to have her assets released from Israel after the declaration of state. She was repeatedly turned down under the Absentees' Property Laws, but with added support from the then president of Lebanon, Camille Chamoun, in 1980 the court ruled in her favor and financial compensation for land around Jaffa and Haifa was agreed upon. At the time she was one of the richest people in Lebanon and was well known for her support of Pierre Gemayel's Kataeb Party.

She died in 2020, 27 days after being injured by the 2020 Beirut explosion. Her children and grandchildren accepted a wreath and a posthumous National Order of the Cedar medal from a representative of the Lebanese president.

== Philanthropy ==
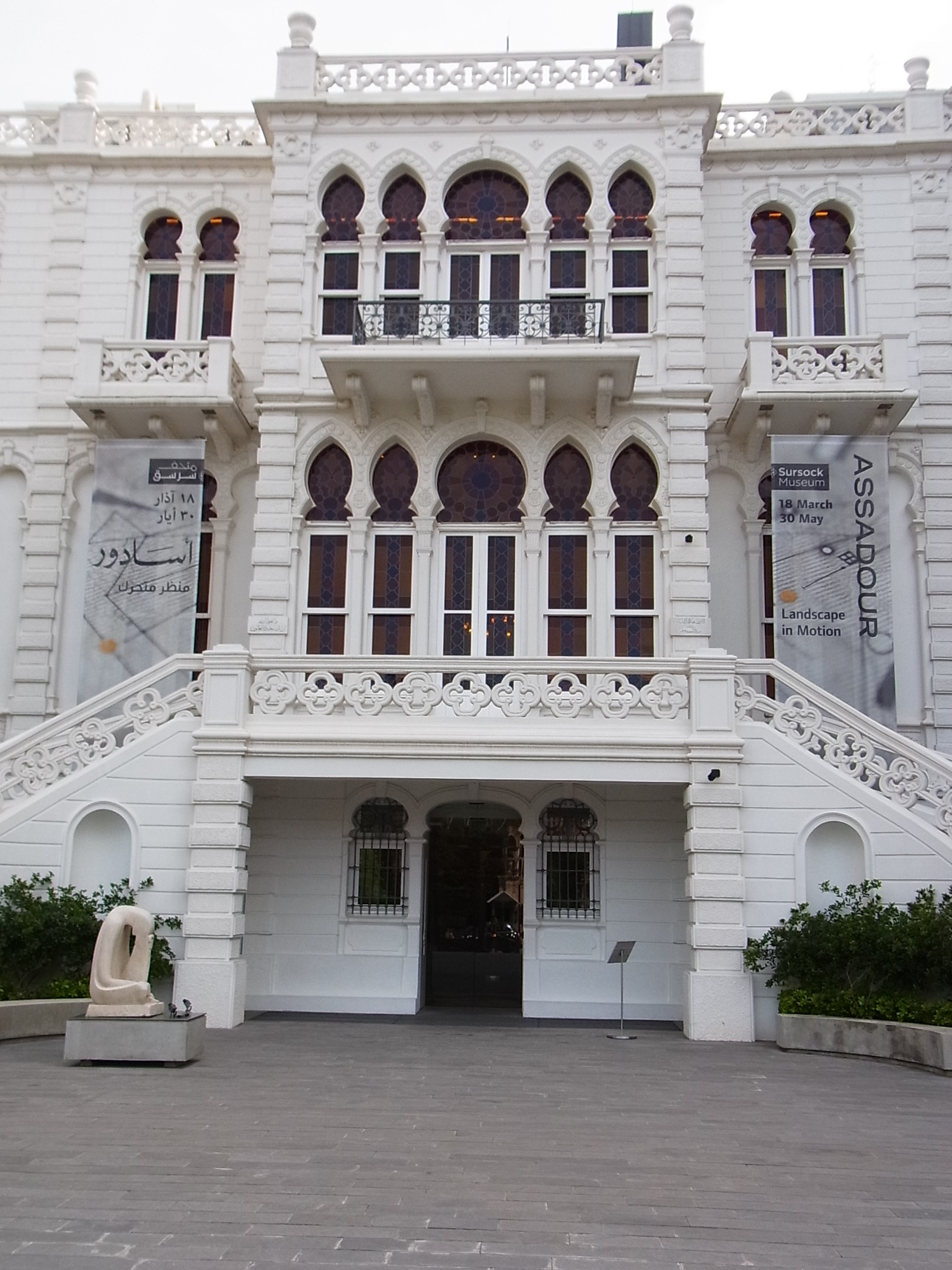
Sursock Museum in Beirut

She was president of the committee and general manager of the Sursock Museum in Beirut from 1960 until 1966. She founded the Association for the Protection of the Natural Sites and Ancient Buildings (French: Association pour la protection des sites et anciennes demeures; APSAD) in Lebanon and was its president from 1960 until 2002.

Her work focused on projects that seek to reduce Lebanese emigration and to support people in their villages of origin, by creating jobs for them in the fields of agriculture, textiles and handcrafts. She was also involved in the protection of the natural environment in Lebanon and in the preservation of the country's unique architectural and cultural heritage.

She was the owner of Sursock Palace, plus a broad swath of property along Rue Sursock, up to the Rue Gouraud.
