= Brooke baronets of Summerton (1903) =

UK Baronetcy based in Castleknock, Ireland

Escutcheon of the Brooke baronets of Summerton

The Brooke baronetcy, of Summerton, Castleknock, in the County of Dublin, was created in the Baronetage of the United Kingdom on 12 October 1903 for George Brooke, head of George F. Brooke and Son, wine merchants, and a Director and Governor of the Bank of Ireland. He was the grandson of George Frederick Brooke (1779–1865), younger brother of the 1st Baronet of the 1822 creation, and nephew of the 1st Baronet of the 1764 creation.

As of 2026 the baronetcy is held by his great-grandson the 4th Baronet, who succeeded in 1982.

== Brooke baronets, of Summerton (1903) ==
- Sir George Frederick Brooke, 1st Baronet (1849–1926)
- Sir Francis Hugh Brooke, 2nd Baronet (1882–1954)
- Sir George Cecil Francis Brooke, 3rd Baronet (1916–1982)
- Sir Francis George Windham Brooke, 4th Baronet (born 1963)

The heir apparent is the present holder's only son George Francis Geoffrey Brooke (born 1991).

== Extended family ==
John Brooke (1887–1974), sixth son of the 1st Baronet, was a captain in the Royal Navy.

== Notes ==
Baronetage of the United Kingdom
Preceded by FitzGerald baronets	Brooke baronets of Summerton; 12 October 1903	Succeeded by Smiley baronets
