= Daheshism =

Religious and philosophical movement

- Region: Worldwide
- Founder: Dr. Dahesh
- Origin: 1942; Lebanon

Daheshism (in Arabic الداهشية) is a spiritual message established by Dr. Dahesh (real name Salim Moussa Achi) born in Jerusalem on June 1, 1909.

On March 23, 1942, at the age of thirty-three, Dr. Dahesh ("Dahesh" in Arabic means "he who astounds") proclaimed in Beirut a spiritual message in which he called upon all people to embrace the ideals, the essence of their religions, not reducing their faith into external shows of pagan-like rituals and practices. He declared his belief that humans—like all the other creatures on Earth—are subject to a cosmic law system.

The just dispensations of this spiritual system apportion to humans their reincarnation on Earth, or in other worlds, according to their deserts. This cycle of reincarnation will come to an end only when they achieve spiritual transcendence by their own free will, integrating themselves into the spirit world.

== Beliefs ==
Proclaimed by Salim Moussa Achi ("Doctor Dahesh") on March 23, 1942, Daheshism is a spiritual doctrine whose tenets are built around the belief in a deeply mysterious, non-anthropomorphic, ever-present and watchful God. Daheshism teaches that all the major prophets (e.g., Abraham, Moses, David, Buddha, Jesus, and Mohammad) emanated from the same source known as The Christ. However — and as per a written directive by Doctor Dahesh — a Daheshist is obligated to respect other cultures' idea of God, to refrain from proselytizing, and never to engage in any sort of coercion. Daheshism believes in the intrinsic correlation between all the major religions: while Daheshism implies a “Unity of Religions,” it recognizes the necessity for those different religions. From a Daheshist perspective, a Christian, for example, need only become a better Christian.

A Daheshist believes that all of creation is spread out over a multidimensional universe divided into three principal realms, each divided into 150 levels:

The utmost 150 levels make up the World of the Spirits, also known as The Divine Worlds. The highest, or purest of these Divine Worlds, are called The Heavens — the realm of God almighty.

Daheshists believe that since no one can transgress certain limits — ever — the prospect of peering into the realm of God is therefore impossible.

The realm of the Spirits comprises 150 levels; within these levels, dwell the Spirits. From these Spirits, extends a network of energy signatures known to the Daheshists as the Spiritual Fluids, in various degrees of loftiness, and depth, forming two subsequent realms known as Paradise, and Hell, each divided into 150 levels.

Spiritual Fluids are therefore the utmost-fundamental sentient energy building blocks, as well as the fabric and hidden consciousness of the realms of Paradise and Hell.

Daheshists believe in the existence of an equitable universal justice system that allows the Spiritual Fluids of all living — and non-living matter alike — to leave one plane of existence and reincarnate into another, according to their actions and tendencies. It is through these many cycles of reincarnation that Spiritual Fluids are given the opportunity to purify themselves in order to materialize in progressively better worlds, with the ultimate goal to become one with God.

To a Daheshist, as sad and tragic as it may often feel, death is but a transition from one reality into another whose setting and circumstances that lie waiting are the direct consequences of one's thoughts and actions.

Daheshism is summarized in the following five points:

- The existence and immortality of the spirit.
- Spiritual Fluids form the texture of the universe, and the substance of its creatures.
- Spiritual causality and just reward. (karma)
- Reincarnation.
- The essential unity of all religions.

Daheshists believe that Doctor Dahesh was, in part, a materialization of a Spiritual Fluid from THE CHRIST — the source of all the prophets, including Jesus Christ and Moses.

== Literature ==
The Dahesh Heritage Center and The Daheshist Publishing Company, located on Broadway, New York, publish many books related to Dr. Dahesh's literature; Daheshism history; beliefs and news; and art-related literature as Dr. Dahesh was an avid art collector. His art collection is gathered in the Dahesh Museum of Art in New York.

The Daheshist Publishing Company also publishes the quarterly publication Dahesh Voice (in Arabic صوت داهش) in English and Arabic.

== Bibliography ==
- Doctor Dahesh, "Strange Tales and Wondrous Legends, Part III," Daheshist Publishing Company.
- Joseph Henri Chakkour, "Reflections on My Life Before and After Doctor Dahesh", Editions Jeunes Lévrier More information on line
- Georges Henri Chakkour, "Le Daheshisme à vol d'oiseau", Editions Jeunes Lévrier Le Daheshisme expliqué sur le Web
- "The Correspondence Between Dr. Dahesh and Dr. Mohammad Hussein Haykal"
- Dr. Iskandar Shaheen, "The Miracles & Wonders of Dr. Dahesh", ISBN 0-935359-44-3, The Daheshist Publishing Co., NY., 1997
- "Dr. Dahesh: A Man of Mystery", ISBN 1-931126-01-1, The Daheshist Publishing Co., NY., 2001
