= Desmond Cochrane =

British Army officer and Irish diplomat

Sir Desmond Oriel Alistair George Weston Cochrane, 3rd Baronet (22 October 1918 – 12 March 1979), was an officer in the British Army and Honorary Consul-General of Ireland for Syria and Lebanon.

== Life and career ==
He was the son of Sir Ernest Cecil Cochrane, 2nd Baronet, and Elsa Dorothea Marie Schumacher. He was educated at Eton College.

During the Second World War, he was a Major in the Lancashire Fusiliers in the British Army, stationed in the Middle East. Following the cessation of hostilities, he married Yvonne Sursock, only child of a Lebanese aristocrat, Alfred Bey Sursock, in 1946.

His elder brother, Ernest Henry Cochrane, MC, had died on active service as a Major in the Royal Inniskilling Fusiliers in Austria in 1945. Desmond thus succeeded his father to the Cochrane baronetcy on 6 March 1952.

He was the Honorary Consul-General of Ireland for the Republics of Syria and Lebanon, and Controller of Beirut Race Course.

Baronetage of the United Kingdom
Preceded by Ernest Cecil Cochrane	Baronet (of Woodbrook, Cavan); 1952–1979	Succeeded by Henry Marc Sursock Cochrane
