= Dr. Dahesh =

Lebanese philosopher and founder of Daheshism (1909–1984)

Dr. Dahesh الدكتور داهش
- Born: Salim Moussa Achi; June 1, 1909; Jerusalem, Mutasarrifate of Jerusalem, Ottoman Empire
- Died: April 9, 1984 (aged 74); Greenwich, Connecticut, United States

Dr. Dahesh (Arabic: الدكتور داهش) (June 1, 1909 – April 9, 1984) was the title and pen name of Salim Moussa Achi (Arabic: سليم موسى عشّي), a writer, poet, philosopher, and the founder of the spiritual doctrine referred to as Daheshism.

== Early life ==
Salim Moussa Achi was born in Jerusalem on June 1, 1909. He was born to Syriac Orthodox parents Moussa Elias Achi and Shmouneh Hanna Kanun from the villages of Esfes and Azekh in Tur Abdin. Shortly after his birth, the family moved to Beirut, Lebanon. In Beirut, Salim's father worked at the American University printing press until he was drafted to fight in the First World War. He returned in 1918 with deteriorated health and died on January 25, 1920, leaving Shmouneh alone with five children. Most of Salim's siblings had to be raised elsewhere, and Salim himself was sent to live at an orphanage in Ghazir where he also attended school. However, health issues made him soon join his mother in Tripoli. In 1921, Salim lived with relatives Tur Abdin, until he moved back to Beirut in 1924.

== Later life ==
He was a prolific Lebanese author and purported worker of miracles. By the age of 21, he had adopted the name Dahesh, Arabic for "he who astounds" or "he who astonishes."

Dr. Dahesh proclaimed Daheshism on March 23, 1942. Daheshism can be summarized as belief in the existence and immortality of the spirit; reincarnation; the intrinsic correlation between all the major religions; spiritual causality and just reward (i.e. karma). His publishing career included essays, poetry, short stories, novels, and an autobiography, and exceeded 150 works.

Dahesh was imprisoned on September 9, 1944 and later on stripped of his Lebanese nationality and exiled from Lebanon in 1944 during the reign of Lebanese President Bechara El Khoury. In 1953, Lebanon, the newly elected President Camille Chamoun restored his citizenship.

In 1975, Dr. Dahesh immigrated to the United States. He died on April 9, 1984, in Greenwich, Connecticut.

== Art legacy ==
Dahesh began collecting works of art around 1930 and continued to do so for the rest of his life. Today, his art collection belongs to New York City's Dahesh Museum of Art.

He also formed the Dahesh Library, the largest private library in the Arab world, known for its literary, scientific, and artistic holdings, and for its periodical collections. The Dahesh Heritage Center, also includes the offices of the Daheshist Publishing Company, on Broadway, New York.
