= Zuqaq al-Blat =

Quarter of Beirut

Coordinates: 33°53′32″N 35°29′54″E

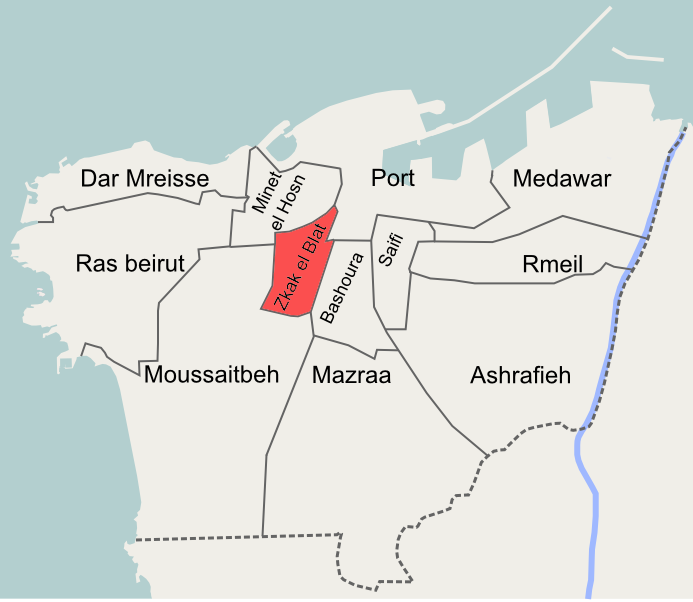
Location of the Zuqaq al-Blat quarter within Beirut

Zuqaq al-Blat (Arabic: زقاق البلاط, romanized: Zuqāq al-Balāṭ) is one of the twelve quarters of Beirut.

== Etymology ==
Zuqaq al-Blat literally means 'The Cobbled Alley'; this was a colloquial name given to the street extending from the old city to the Qantari Hill and which was covered with cobblestones in the 19th century.

Zuqaq al-Blat is also commonly called al-Batrakieh (Arabic: البطركية, romanized: al-Baṭrakiyya, lit. 'the Patriarchate') due to the presence of the seat of the Greek Catholic Patriarchate of Beirut within its borders.

== History ==
Once a medieval walled port town, Beirut experienced rapid growth during the second half of the 19th century; the overcrowded city developed beyond its walls and the affluent citizens started to build their villas on the slopes of the surrounding hills, namely Ashrafieh, Qantari and Musaytbeh.

In 1832 Beirut came under the occupation of Ibrahim Pasha's troops. The new Egyptian authorities undertook grand works of urban planning and sanitation. The appointed Egyptian-Circassian governor of Beirut, Mahmoud Na'ami Bey commissioned street cobbling works which stretched beyond the city's walls, the street extending from the south-western side of the city wall into the new extramural neighborhoods on the Qantari hill came to be known as Zuqaq al-Blat and gave its name to the quarter.

== Demographics ==
Religion in Zuqaq al-Blat (2014)
Religion	Percent
Sunni Islam	50.89%
Shia Islam	39.32%
Christian	8.96%
Others	0.83%

In 2014, Muslims made up 90.23% and Christians made up 8.96% of registered voters in Zuqaq al-Blat. 50.89% of the voters were Sunni Muslims and 39.32% were Shiite Muslims.

== Notable residents ==
- Abd el-Qader Qabbani
- Butrus Bustani
- Fairuz
- Hussein Beyhum
- Khalil Sarkis
- Charles de Gaulle
- Omar Zaani
