= Liwan =

Hall in Arabic houses

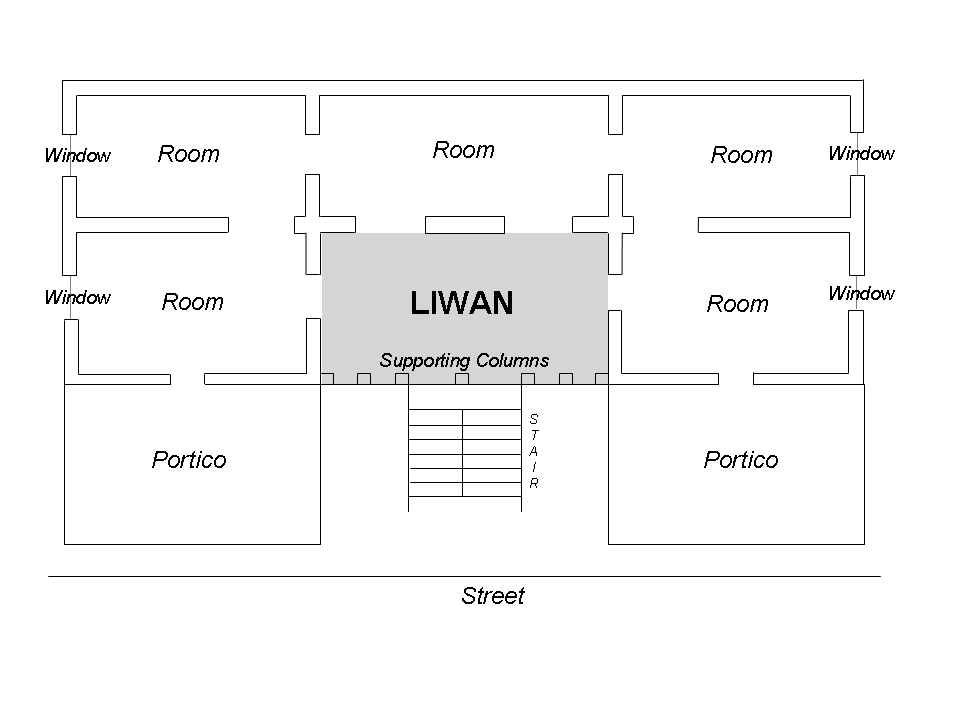
An architectural drawing of a typical Levantine house, with the liwan area in grey.

Liwan (Arabic: ليوان, līwān, from Persian eyvān) is a long narrow-fronted hall or vaulted portal in ancient and modern Levantine homes that is often open to the outside. An Arabic loanword to English, it is ultimately derived from the Persian eyvān, which preceded by the article al ("the"), came to be said as līwān in Arabic, and later, English.

In its simplest form, the history of the liwan dates back more than 2,000 years, when the liwan house was essentially a covered terrace, supported by retaining walls, with a courtyard in front.

In its more complex forms, the liwan house is composed of a large ceremonial entrance hall (liwan) at the front of the complex, divided into three sections, and flanked by two smaller liwans. The back of the house opens onto a columned peristyle courtyard from which the main room and the private apartments opposite can be accessed, with symmetry on either side of the central axis.

Mats and carpets are typically spread along the length of the floor of the liwan, and the mattresses and cushions along the length of the walls make up the diwan or divan seating area.

== Types of liwan houses ==
=== Three-arched house or Central Hall House ===
One type of liwan house is the three-arched house or "Central Hall House", as coined by Friedrich Ragette in 1974. It is also known as the "traditional house" or "Late-Ottoman Arab House" in Haifa or the "Beiruti House" in Mersin.

The 19th-century Levantine model of the three-arched house with many regional variations is found in the coastal regions of Lebanon, Syria, Palestine, and Turkey. A representative example of the liwan house commonly found in towns throughout the West Bank and Gaza is the Al Imam house in Hebron.

== See also ==
- Iwan – Structure in Iranian and Islamic architecture
- Hosh (architecture) – Traditional Arab courtyard

== Bibliography ==
- Abu Salih the Armenian; Evetts, B.T.A; Butler, Alfred Joshua; bn Alī Magrīzī, Ahmad (2002), The Churches and Monasteries of Egypt and Some Neighbouring Countries, Gorgias Press LLC, ISBN 0-9715986-7-3
- Abercrombie, Sir Patrick (1910), The Town Planning Review, Liverpool University Press
- Davey, Eileen (1993), Northern Cyprus: A Traveler's Guide, I.B.Tauris, ISBN 1-85043-747-5
- Houtsma, Martijn Theodoor; Arnold, T.W.; Wensinck, A.J. (1993), E.J. Brill's First Encyclopaedia of Islam, 1913-1936, BRILL, ISBN 9789004097964
