= Dahesh Museum of Art =

Art museum in Manhattan, New York

Coordinates: 40°43′30″N 74°00′17″W

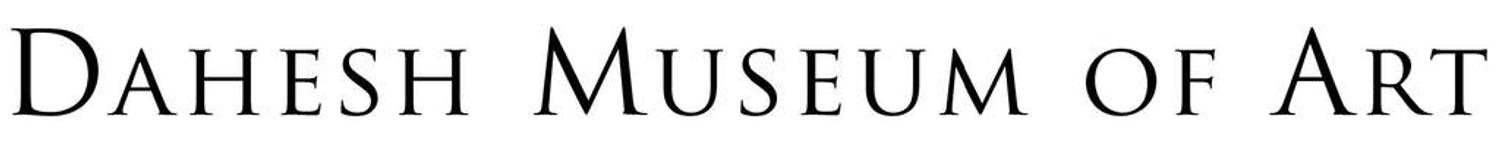

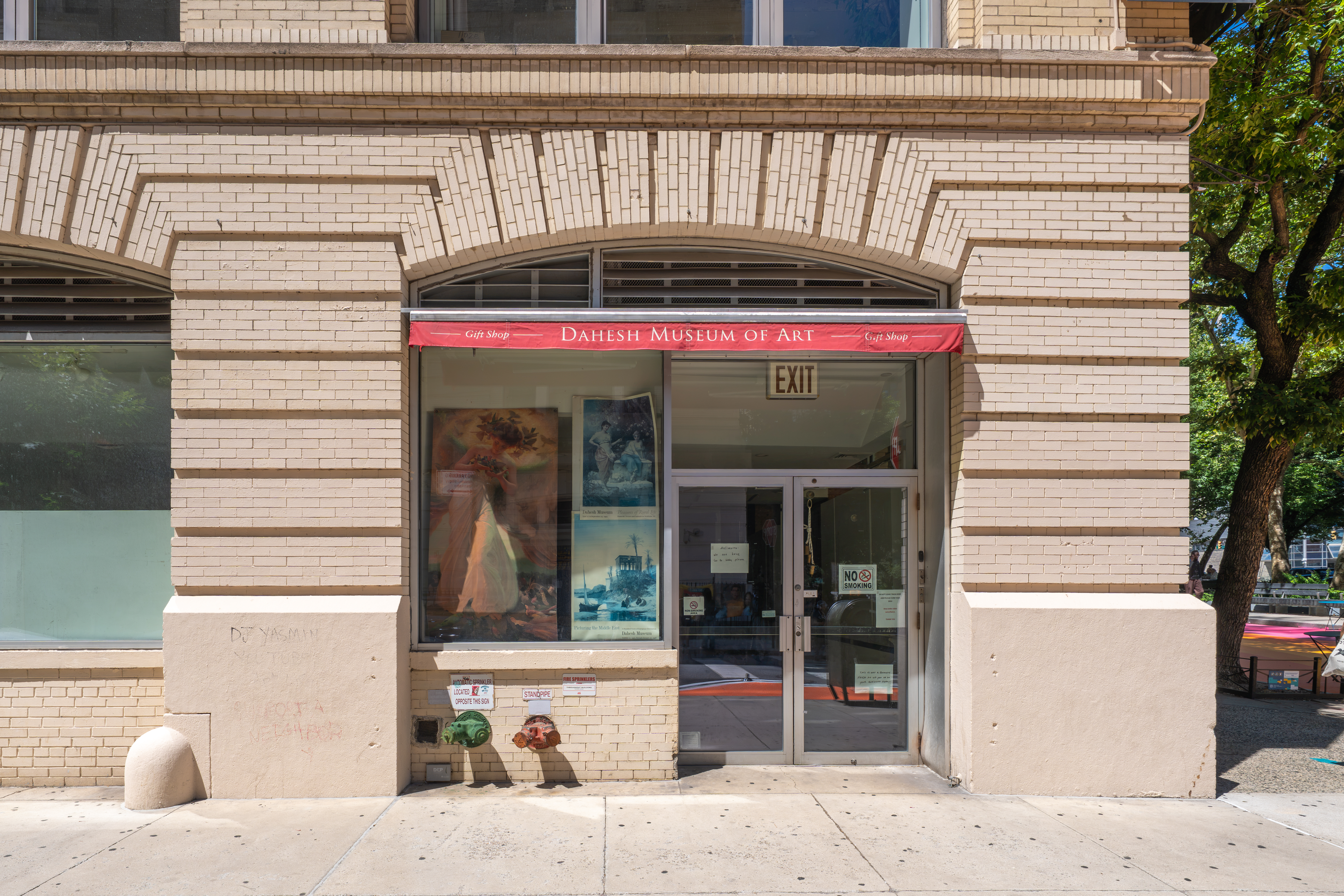
- Location at 145 6th Ave
- Established: 1995
- Location: 145 Sixth Avenue, New York 10013
- Website: Dahesh Museum of Art

The Dahesh Museum of Art is the only museum in the United States devoted to the collection and exhibition of European academic art of the 19th and 20th centuries. The collection, located in Manhattan, New York City, originated with Lebanese writer and philosopher Salim Moussa Achi (1909–1984), whose pen name was Dr. Dahesh. The core of the museum's holdings consists of Dahesh's collection of more than 2,000 academic paintings, which includes many notable Orientalist paintings.

The museum's regular exhibition space closed in 2008, leaving the museum temporarily available only online and in traveling exhibitions. In early 2012, the museum reopened an office and gift shop in Manhattan's Hudson Square neighborhood, near SoHo. Renovations began in 2015 on the museum's new permanent home at 178 East 64th Street. According to the museum's website, the opening is anticipated in winter 2019–2020.

== Collection ==
The museum is noted for its outstanding collections of orientalist paintings and works by American illustrators.

== History ==
The museum's creation stems from the Zahid family's inheritance of Dahesh's collection upon his death. Five members of the family serve on the museum's Board and chose to create the museum in Manhattan rather than Lebanon due to the challenges of the city's art community arising from the political instability of the country. Despite some concerns about the art's origins, the museum was incorporated in 1987 and opened officially in 1995 at an 1,800-square-foot (170 m^{2}) gallery on Fifth Avenue. It struggled in the early years, due in part to the relatively obscure nature of its founder's legacy, and the perception of illustration as an art form. Despite the struggles, the museum attracted an annual attendance of about 20,000 people and it was able to amass a $30m endowment in a little more than five years, rivaling that of the Guggenheim Museum.

In September 2003, it opened in a new 30,000-square-foot (2,800 m^{2}) space at 580 Madison Avenue and 56th Street three years after an unsuccessful bid on a Columbus Circle property and a year after the new location was announced. This property, the former IBM Gallery, was completely redesigned by Hardy Holzman Pfeiffer Associates. The museum moved out of the Madison Avenue space in January 2008, due to rent related issues that caused it to look for a subletter for the remainder of its lease. While the museum did not have a physical presence in New York City, the collection continued to travel and the website has been redesigned in order to make the collection virtual.

While seeking a permanent home, the Dahesh described its mission as a museum without walls, engaging in a regular program of loan exhibitions to museums and galleries, and, in early 2012, opening a gift shop and salon space on Sixth Avenue in Manhattan's Hudson Square neighborhood. The space enabled some public programming and a small presentation of the museum's holdings.

== See also ==
- Art Renewal Center
