= Hikma =

Hikma (Arabic: حكمة), or other romanisations such as Hikmah and Hekme, may refer to:

== Education ==
- Al-Hikmah University, a private university in Ilorin, Nigeria
- Al-Hikma University (Baghdad), a former university in Baghdad, Iraq
- Dar Al-Hekma University, a women's tertiary institute in Jeddah, Saudi Arabia
- Collège de la Sagesse, also known as Al Hekmeh, private school in Beirut, Lebanon
  - Sagesse High School, also known as Hekmeh High School, a private school in Beirut, Lebanon
- Université La Sagesse, also known as Al Hekmeh University, academic institute in Furn-El-Chebak, Lebanon
- House of Wisdom (Bayt al-Ḥikmah), a former library and translation institute in Baghdad, Iraq

== Sports ==
- Sagesse SC, also known as Hekmeh, a Lebanese multi-sports club
  - Sagesse SC (basketball), a Lebanese basketball club
  - Sagesse SC (football), a Lebanese football club

== Other ==
- Hikmah, the concept of wisdom in Islamic philosophy
- Hikma Pharmaceuticals, a British multinational pharmaceutical company
- Al Hekma Tower, a skyscraper in Dubai, United Arab Emirates
- Masjid Alhikmah, a mosque in Aberdeen, Scotland

== See also ==
- Sagesse (disambiguation)
- Wisdom (disambiguation)
