= Sagesse (disambiguation) =

Sagesse (French, 'Wisdom') is an 1881 volume of French poetry by Paul Verlaine.

Sagesse or La Sagesse may also refer to:

== Education ==
- Collège de la Sagesse, originally l'École de la Sagesse, a Lebanese school, and the Sagesse school network
  - Sagesse High School, in Ain Saadeh, Matn District, Lebanon
- La Sagesse School, in Jesmond, Newcastle upon Tyne, England, 1906–2008
- Université La Sagesse, in Lebanon

== People ==
- Sagesse Babélé (born 1993), Congolese footballer
- Renaldo Sagesse (born 1986), Canadian football defensive lineman

== Sports ==
- La Sagesse (horse), a racehorse
- Sagesse SC, a Lebanese multi-sport club
  - Sagesse SC (basketball)
  - Sagesse SC (football)

== See also ==
- Wisdom (disambiguation)
- Hikma (disambiguation)
