= Paul Youssef Matar =

The Most Reverend Paul Youssef Matar
- Archeparch
- Church: Catholic Church
- Diocese: Maronite Catholic Archeparchy of Beirut
- Successor: Paul Abdel Sater

Personal details
- Born: Paul Youssef Matar; February 1, 1941 (age 85)
- Denomination: Maronite Church

Paul Youssef Matar (born 1 February 1941 in Naameh, Lebanon) was the former Archeparch of the Maronite Catholic Archeparchy of Beirut. The archeparchial seat is the city of Beirut, at the Saint George Cathedral.

== Life ==
Paul Youssef Matar was born on February 1, 1941, in the Mount Lebanon Governorate in Na'ameh, located in the historic Chouf Region. He holds a BA degree in Theology and a Masters in Philosophy; he also holds a PhD in Philosophy from the Sorbonne-Paris University.

On 5 June 1965 at the age of 24, Matar was ordained to the priesthood. He subsequently served as director and later president of the Maronite school "Al-Hikma" in Beirut. Matar was also selected by the Council of Catholic Patriarchs and Bishops in Lebanon as president of Caritas-Lebanon.

His appointment as auxiliary bishop of the Maronite Patriarchate of Antioch was on 7 June 1991 as his appointment as Titular bishop of Tarsus dei Maroniti. His ordination to the episcopate took place on 3 August 1991 by the hands of the Maronite Patriarch of Antioch, Nasrallah Boutros Sfeir, and his co-consecrators were Roland Aboujaoudé, Auxiliary Bishop of Antioch, and Boutros Gemayel, Archeparch of Cyprus. On June 8, 1996, at the age of 55 years, Paul Youssef Matar was appointed archbishop of the Archeparchy of Beirut.

Archbishop Paul Youssef Matar was the main co-consecrator of some Maronite bishops: Youssef Anis Abi-Aad, Samir Nassar, Edgard Madi, Michel Aoun, Moussa El-Hage, Georges Chihane, Paul Rouhana, Maroun Ammar, Joseph Emile Mouawad, Anthony Tarabay and Paul Abdel Sater.

He is chancellor of Collège de la Sagesse and Université La Sagesse in Beirut as they both fall under the jurisdiction of Maronite Beirut Archeparchy.
