= Saint Elias Maronite Church, Kantari =

Church in Beirut

- كنيسة مار الياس القنطاري
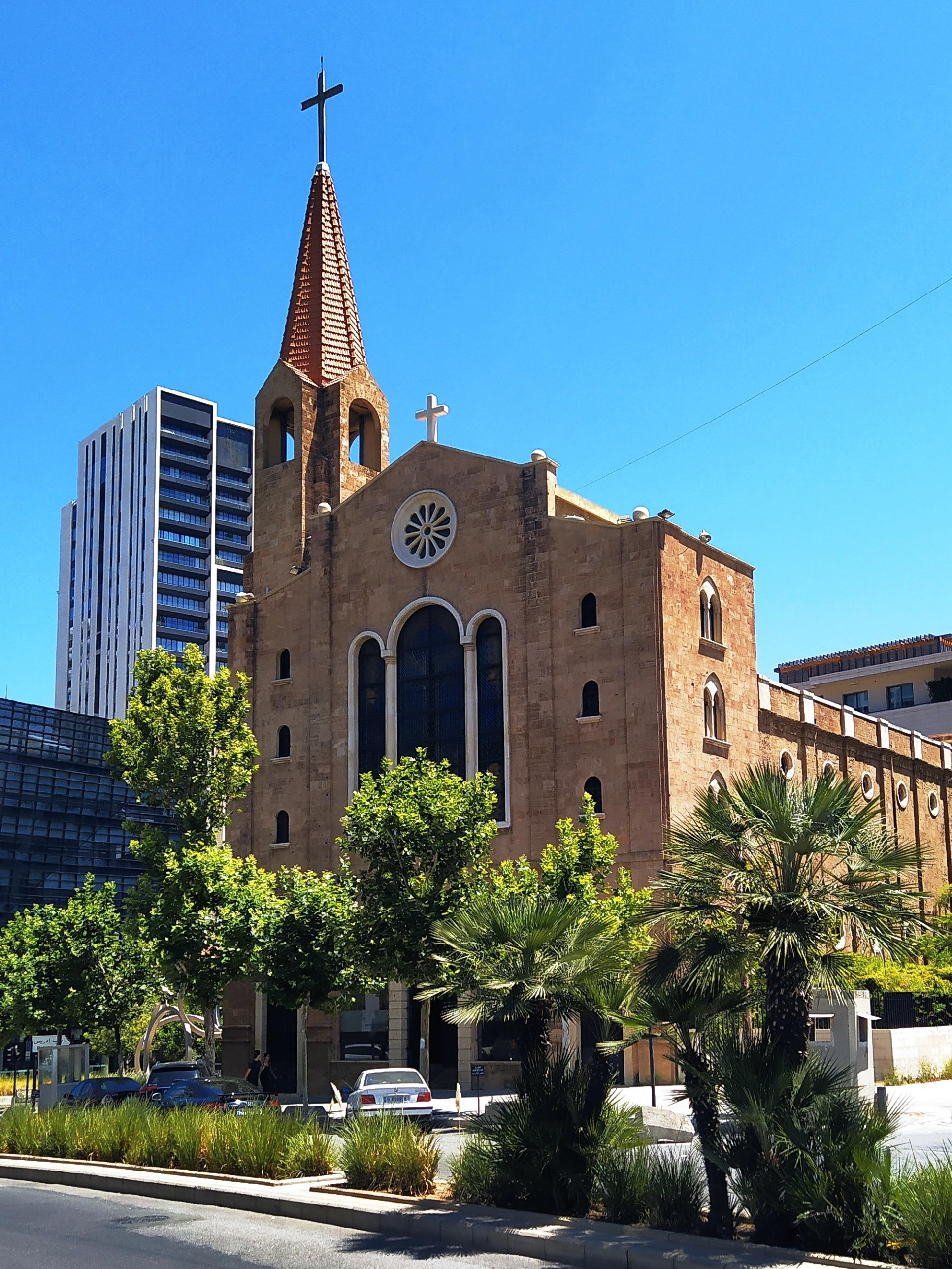

- Location in Beirut

Religion
- Affiliation: Maronite Church
- Region: Minet al-Hosn, Beirut
- Rite: Antiochian Rite
- Ecclesiastical or organisational status: Active parish church
- Patron: Saint Elijah

Location
- Location: Kantari, Beirut, Lebanon
- Municipality: Beirut
- Country: Lebanon
- Coordinates: 33.89721°N 35.49641°E

Architecture
- Architect: Unknown Italian architect
- Completed: 1907
- Direction of façade: West

Saint Elias Maronite Church (Arabic: كنيسة مار الياس القنطاري, also known in French as Église Saint-Élie de Kantari) is a Maronite parish church located on Fakhreddine Street in the Kantari district of Beirut, Lebanon. The church was completed in 1907 and was heavily damaged during the Lebanese Civil War (1975–1990) before being restored and re-inaugurated in 2002. It sustained further damage in the 2020 Beirut port explosion.

== Location ==
The church stands on Fakhreddine Street in the Kantari neighbourhood of Beirut, west of the city's historic center. Kantari developed as a residential district during the late Ottoman period, as Beirut expanded beyond its walls in the second half of the nineteenth century. The neighborhood lies close to what became, during the Lebanese Civil War (1975–1990), the Green Line separating the city's eastern and western sectors.

== History ==
=== Origins and construction ===
The neighbourhood of Kantari developed rapidly during the late nineteenth century as Beirut expanded westward from its historic center during the late Ottoman period. By the early twentieth century, the area had become a residential district.

A small chapel dedicated to the prophet Elijah existed on the site as early as the eighteenth century, serving the Maronite community of the Minet el-Hosn district, which was receiving migrants primarily from the Kesrouan region of Mount Lebanon. By the late nineteenth century the chapel had become too small for the growing parish. Archbishop Joseph Debs (1833–1907), Maronite Archbishop of Beirut from 1872 until his death in 1907, commissioned the construction of a new church to replace it, entrusting the project to an unnamed Italian architect. Construction was completed in 1907, as recorded by a commemorative plaque above the entrance doorway. The church is listed in period surveys of the Maronite community's urban presence in Beirut alongside Saint-Maron at Saïfi (1874) and the archdiocese church of Saint Joseph (1878).

=== Presidential parish ===
In the 1940s and 1950s the church served as the official parish of the former Lebanese presidential palace, which was then located in Kantari on rue Michel Chiha. Presidents Emile Eddé, Bechara El-Khoury and Camille Chamoun attended Sunday mass at Saint Elias during their respective terms.

=== Civil War damage and 2001 restoration ===
During the Lebanese Civil War (1975–1990), the church was largely abandoned as the Maronite population left the district. The building sustained serious damage: the sacristy was burned and subsequently demolished. Restoration began in 2001. It involved stripping interior plaster to expose the yellow sandstone walls and arcades, installing a new bell, and rebuilding a three-storey annex on the north side to replace one destroyed during the war. The annex houses a ground-floor hall used for gatherings, a basement dining room, and an upper hall intended for cultural events and exhibitions. On 20 July 2002, the feast day of Saint Elias, Paul Youssef Matar, Maronite Archbishop of Beirut, re-inaugurated the restored church. In his homily, Archbishop Matar recalled that Saint Elias was the first Maronite parish church of the capital, and described the restoration as "a genuine act of faith in the return of Beirut to all its sons".

=== 2020 Beirut port explosion ===
The church was among the Maronite religious buildings damaged by the 2020 Beirut port explosion of 4 August 2020.

== Architecture ==
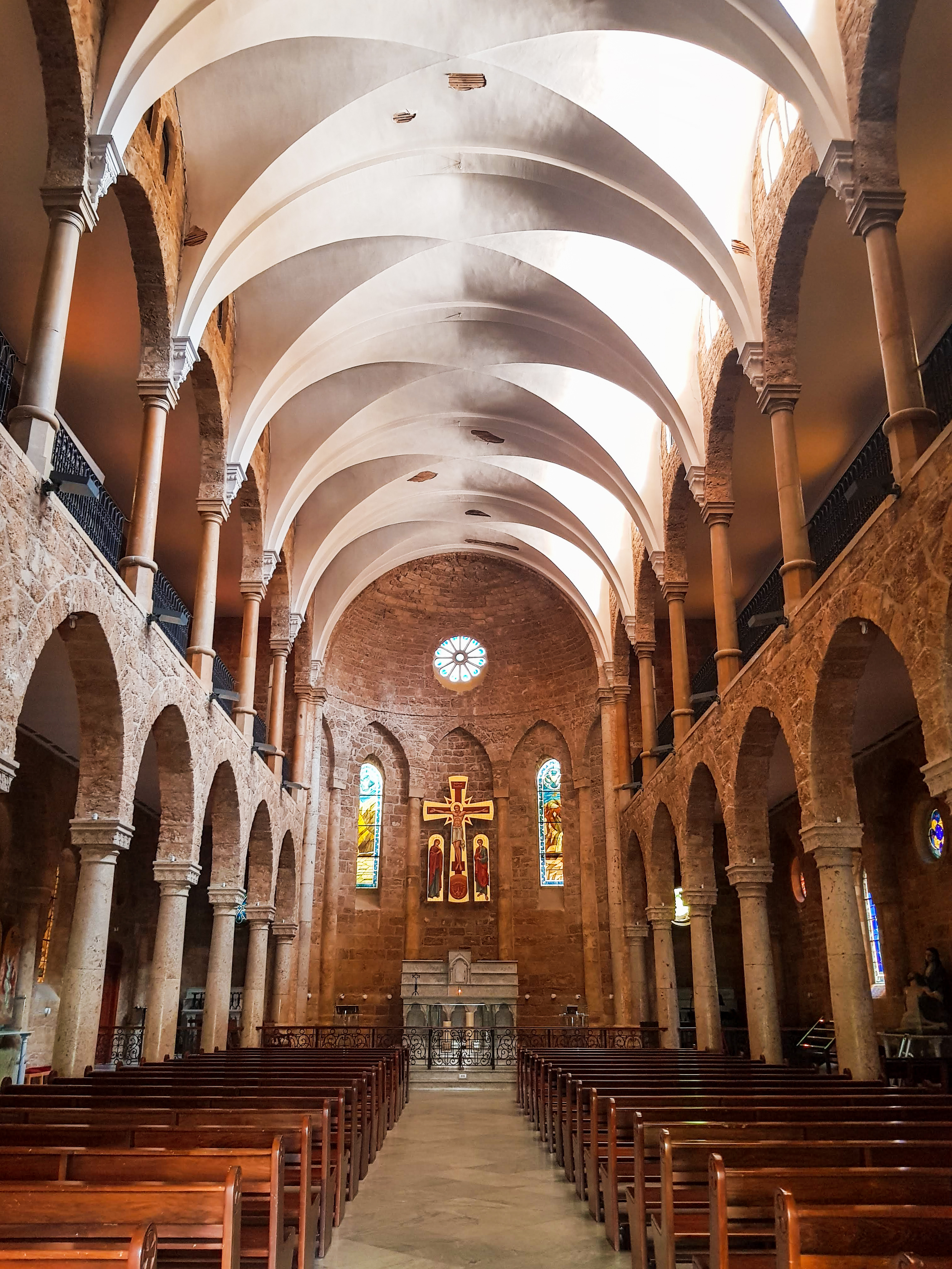
Interior

The church is built with yellow sandstone and red roof tiles. The façade incorporates neoclassical and Italianate elements. Three arched vaults define the entrance porch; the facade is prolonged at its north side by a bell tower. The lateral façades are plainer, with oculi arranged on each bay.

The interior is a three-aisled basilica, the central nave separated from the lateral aisles by fourteen columns with sculpted capitals, made from the same material as the columns of the Roman temple of Deir el-Kalaa at Beit Mery. The columns carry arcades at 5.70 meters, above which a gallery level at 6.50 meters runs along the side aisles. A second tier of arcades rises further to clerestory windows admitting light into the nave at over fourteen meters. The lateral aisles terminate in secondary altars flanking the high altar. The choir opens through a plain arch of 14 meters, above which two tall stained-glass lancets and a rose window are framed by oculi on either side.

In 2003 the stained-glass windows were commissioned from French stained-glass artist Jacques Guitton, with the program completed in 2005. Guitton opted for a contemporary rather than historicist depiction of the religious scenesd. He died shortly after completing the commission.
