= Wisdom (disambiguation) =

Wisdom is a form of knowledge.

Wisdom may also refer to:

== Media ==
- Wisdom (film), a 1986 American crime film
- Wisdom (TV series), a 1950s NBC television show featuring interviews with notable scientists, artists and politicians of the time
- WISDOM Media Group, a defunct television network operating from 1999 to 2005

== Music ==
- Wisdom (16volt album), 1993
- Wisdom (Altaria album), 2022
- "Wisdom" (song), a 1993 song by David Gray
- "Wisdom", a song by The Brian Jonestown Massacre from the 1995 album Methodrone
- "Wisdom", a song by Mother Mother from the 2008 album O My Heart
- Wisdom (band), a Hungarian band that uses quotations as the basis for its songs

== Religion and philosophy ==
- Book of Wisdom, one of the deuterocanonical books of the Bible
- Books of Wisdom of the Hebrew Bible
- Chokmah, a Biblical term for wisdom with different meanings
- Prajñā (Buddhism), translated as "wisdom", "insight", "intelligence", or "understanding"
- Sophia (wisdom), a goddess in Greek philosophy
- Wisdom (personification), motif in religious and philosophical texts
- Wisdom King, type of Buddhist deity
- Wisdom literature of the Ancient Near East

== People ==
- Wisdom Fofo Agbo (born 1979), Ghanaian-born Hong Kong footballer
- Wisdom Mumba Chansa (1964-1993), Zambian footballer
- Wisdom Onyekwere, former Nigerian footballer
- Wisdom Siziba (1980-2009), Zimbabwean cricketer
- Wisdom Mikeal Oluola (born 2004), American rapper, singer-songwriter

== Other ==
- Wisdom (surname)
- Wisdom (albatross), the world's oldest wild bird
- 3402 Wisdom, an asteroid
- Wisdom, Kentucky
- Wisdom, Missouri
- Wisdom, Montana
- WISDOM Project Water-related Information System for the sustainable Development of the Mekong Delta in Vietnam
- House of Wisdom, a 9th-century research centre in Baghdad
- Wisdom tooth in humans
- Wisdom (play), a 15th-century English morality play
- Wisdom, a collective noun for a group of wombats
- WISDOM (radar) (Water Ice and Subsurface Deposit Observation on Mars), a ground-penetrating radar on the ExoMars rover
- Wisdom Airways, an airline in Thailand

== See also ==
- Sagesse (disambiguation)
- Hikma (disambiguation)
