= Samir Nassar =

Lebanese Catholic priest (born 1950)

- Archeparch of Damascus
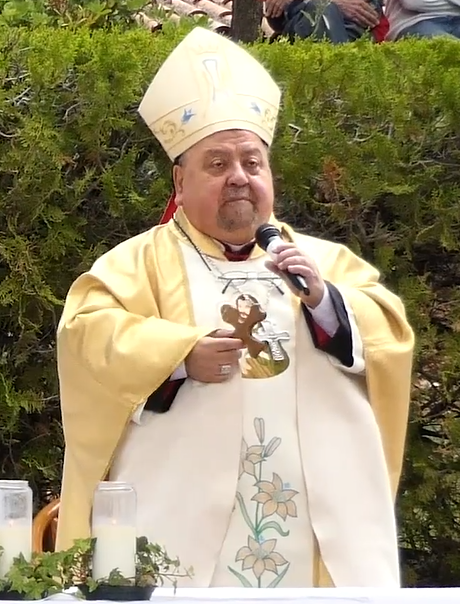
- Archeparch Nassar in 2017
- Native name: سمير نصار
- Church: Maronite Church
- Archdiocese: Archeparchy of Damascus
- Installed: 14 August 2006
- Predecessor: Raymond Eid

Orders
- Ordination: 17 August 1980
- Consecration: 26 November 2006 by Nasrallah Boutros Sfeir

Personal details
- Born: 5 July 1950 (age 76) Nabay, Mount Lebanon Governorate, Lebanon

Samir Nassar (born 5 July 1950 in Nebay, Lebanon) is the current archeparch of the Maronite Catholic Archeparchy of Damascus. He is due to step down in late 2026, and will be succeeded by Sharbel Maroun.

== Life ==
Samir Nassar received on August 17, 1980, the sacrament of Holy orders and was incardinated in the clergy of the Maronite Archeparchy of Damascus.

On 10 June 2006, he was elected bishop by the synod of the Maronite Church to the Archeparchy of Damascus. Pope Benedict XVI approved his election as archbishop of the Archeparchy of Damascus on 14 October 2006. Maronite Patriarch of Antioch, Nasrallah Boutros Sfeir, gave him on 26 November of the same year the episcopal ordination and his co-consecrators were the Archbishop of the Maronite Catholic Archeparchy of Beirut, Paul Youssef Matar and the retired bishop of the Maronite Catholic Eparchy of Our Lady of Lebanon of São Paulo, Joseph Mahfouz, OLM.

On 8 January 2018, a bomb hit Nassar's bedroom, where he had been taking a nap, with him barely surviving due to his getting up to use the bathroom before the bomb hit his room. The Maronite Cathedral of Damascus was also damaged.
