= Maronite Cathedral of Saint George, Beirut =

Church in Beirut, Lebanon

Saint George Maronite Cathedral
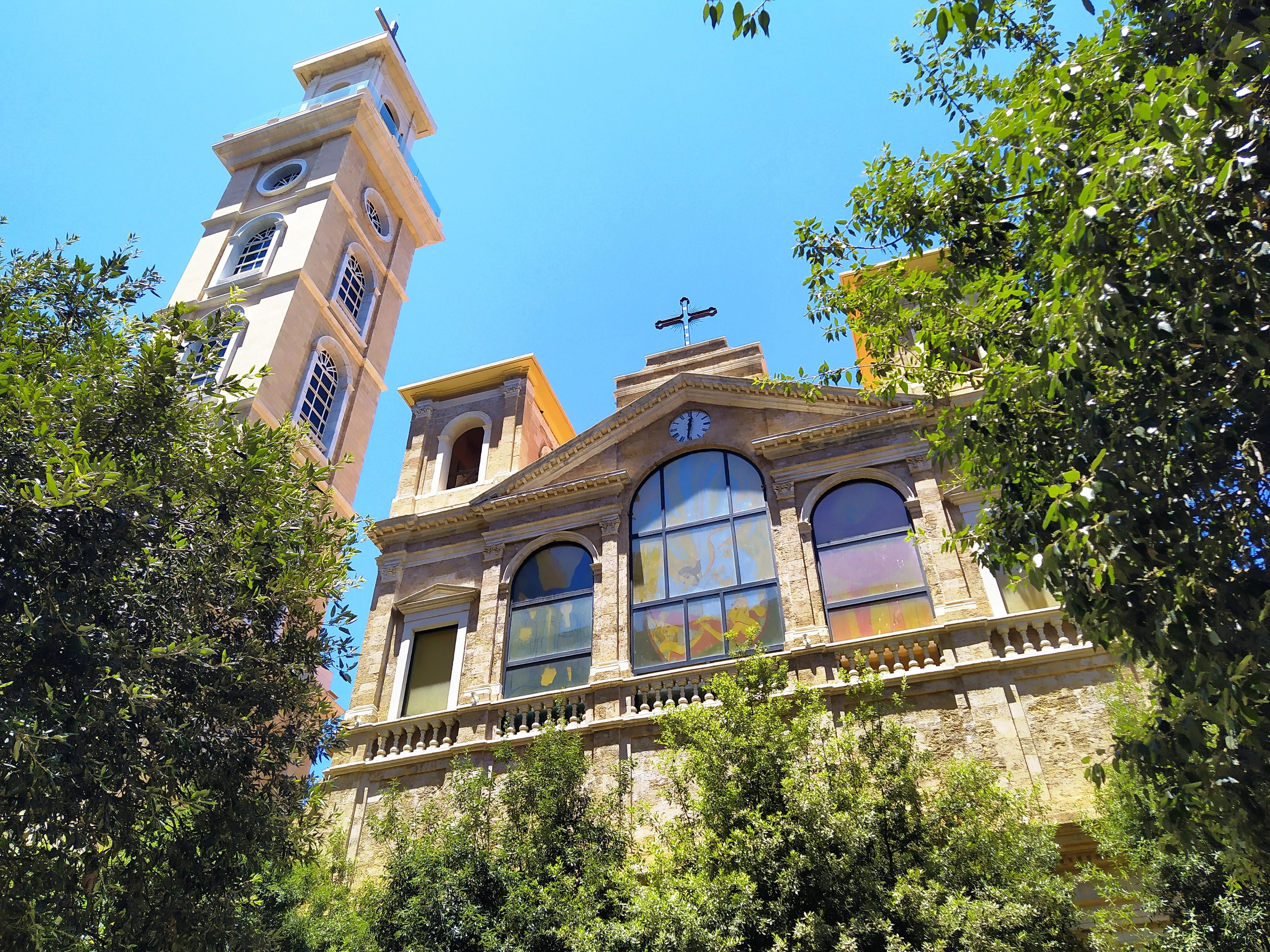

- The Cathedral shown within Beirut

Religion
- Affiliation: Maronite Church
- Year consecrated: 1894
- Status: active

Location
- Location: Beirut, Lebanon
- Coordinates: 33.895272°N 35.505310°E

Architecture
- Architect: Giuseppe Maggiore
- Style: Neo-Classical
- Groundbreaking: 1884
- Completed: 1894

Specifications
- Direction of façade: South
- Materials: Sandstone, marble, granite, limestone

Saint George Maronite Cathedral (Arabic: كاتدرائية مار جرجس للموارنة) is the cathedral of the Maronite Catholic Archeparchy of Beirut, located in downtown Beirut, Lebanon. Constructed between 1884 and 1894 under Archbishop Joseph Debs, the cathedral stands on the site of an earlier 18th-century church dedicated to Saint George. The cathedral was designed in a Neoclassical style, and its interior was modeled on the Basilica di Santa Maria Maggiore in Rome. The cathedral was severely damaged during the Lebanese Civil War and was restored after the war. It reopened in 2000 and was damaged again in the 2020 Beirut explosion. The cathedral houses the cathedra of the Archbishop of Beirut and the chair used by Pope John Paul II during his 1997 visit. In 2016, a new 72-meter campanile was inaugurated.

== Construction ==
The Cathedral of Saint George was built by Monsignor Joseph Debs, the Archbishop of Beirut, on the site of an earlier church that was also dedicated to the same saint. The earlier structure was built in 1755 to serve the Maronites of Beirut. Work began in 1884 using Roman columns from the temple of Deir El Qalaa in Beit Mery. The edifice was completed and consecrated on Palm Sunday in 1894. Built on the plan of a basilica with its nave and two lateral aisles separated by two rows of columns, the cathedral has a façade of neo-classical style designed by Italian architect Giuseppe Maggiore. The interior bears a general resemblance to that of Santa Maria Maggiore in Rome.

The nave is covered with a coffered ceiling with gilded and a double wooden structure, covered with golden leaves on a beige background. The walls are decorated with stucco and marble. Above the main altar is a canopy four columns. At the rear, in the choir, is the cathedra (bishop throne) of the Archbishop of Beirut, and the chair used by Pope John Paul II during his pastoral visit to Lebanon in 1997.

== Architecture ==
Inspired by the Basilica of Santa Maria Maggiore in Rome, Saint George Maronite Cathedral was constructed between 1884 and 1894 and inaugurated by Bishop Youssef Debs. The Maronite community of Beirut previously worshiped in a small nearby church dating back to 1753. In 1954, engineer Antoun Tabet carried out restoration work inside the cathedral. Originally designed in the shape of a cross, the transept was shortened, and arches were added at both ends. Severely damaged during the Lebanese Civil War (1975–1990), the cathedral was fully rehabilitated by 1997, restoring its original Renaissance cruciform form. It was re-inaugurated in April 2000. Beneath the forecourt of the cathedral’s annex, significant archaeological remains were uncovered and preserved, including a Hellenistic structure, part of the Roman Decumanus Maximus colonnaded street, and an Ottoman wall. On 19 November 2016, Beirut Archbishop Paul Matar inaugurated a new campanile that took ten years to complete. The campanile stands 72 meters (236 ft) tall; the original design planned a 75 meters (246 ft) tower to match the height of the Santa Maria Maggiore basilica’s campanile in Rome. According to the archbishop, reducing the height to equal that of the minarets of the adjacent Mohammad Al-Amin Mosque symbolizes a message of interfaith solidarity and harmony. On 4 August 2020, the cathedral sustained damage in the Beirut explosion.

== Timeline ==
- 1884–1894: Construction of the cathedral, which was inspired by the Basilica Santa Maria Maggiore in Rome.
- 1954: Restoration works inside the cathedral undertaken by Antoun Tabet.
- 1975–1990: Civil War badly damaged the cathedral.
- 1997: Post war rehabilitation of the Cathedral led to the recovery of its original Renaissance cruciform shape. Significant archaeological remains were unearthed and preserved.
- April 2000: Cathedral inauguration.
- 19 November 2016: Campanile inauguration.
- 4 August 2020: Beirut explosions damaged the cathedral.

== Gallery ==
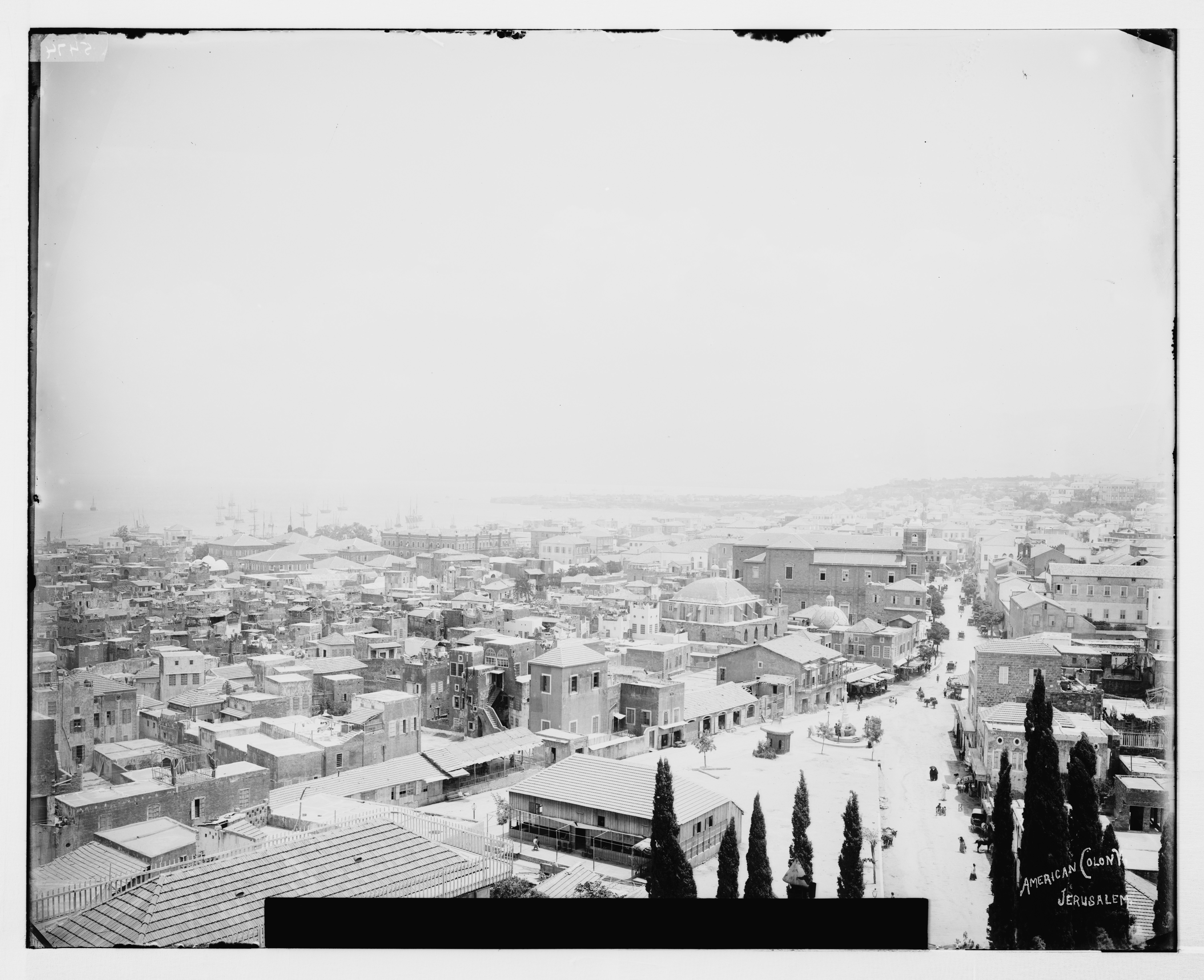
General view of Beirut, c. 1900, showing the Saint George Maronite Cathedral and the former Greek Orthodox church of Our Lady of the Annunciation, since relocated.

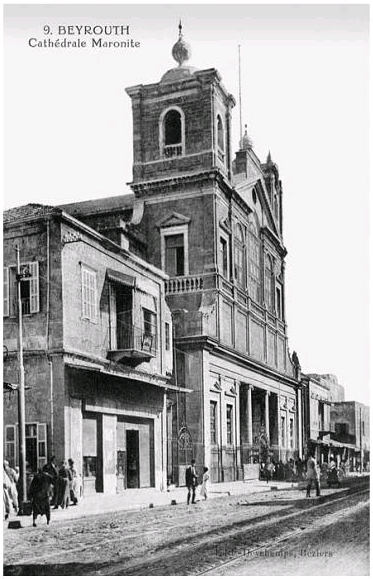
Beirut postcard from the early 20th century showing the cathedral

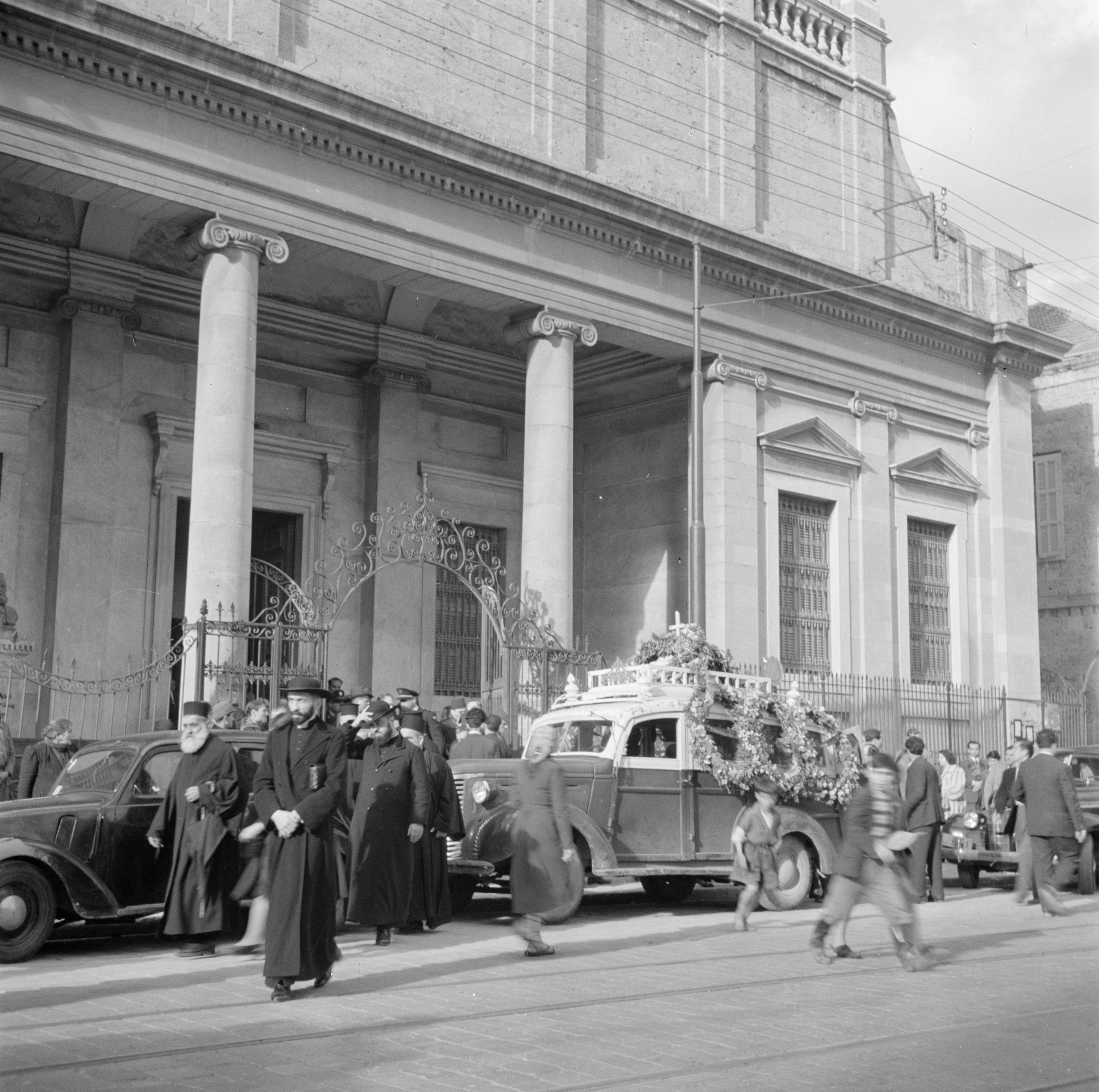
Entrance of the cathedral during a funeral in 1950

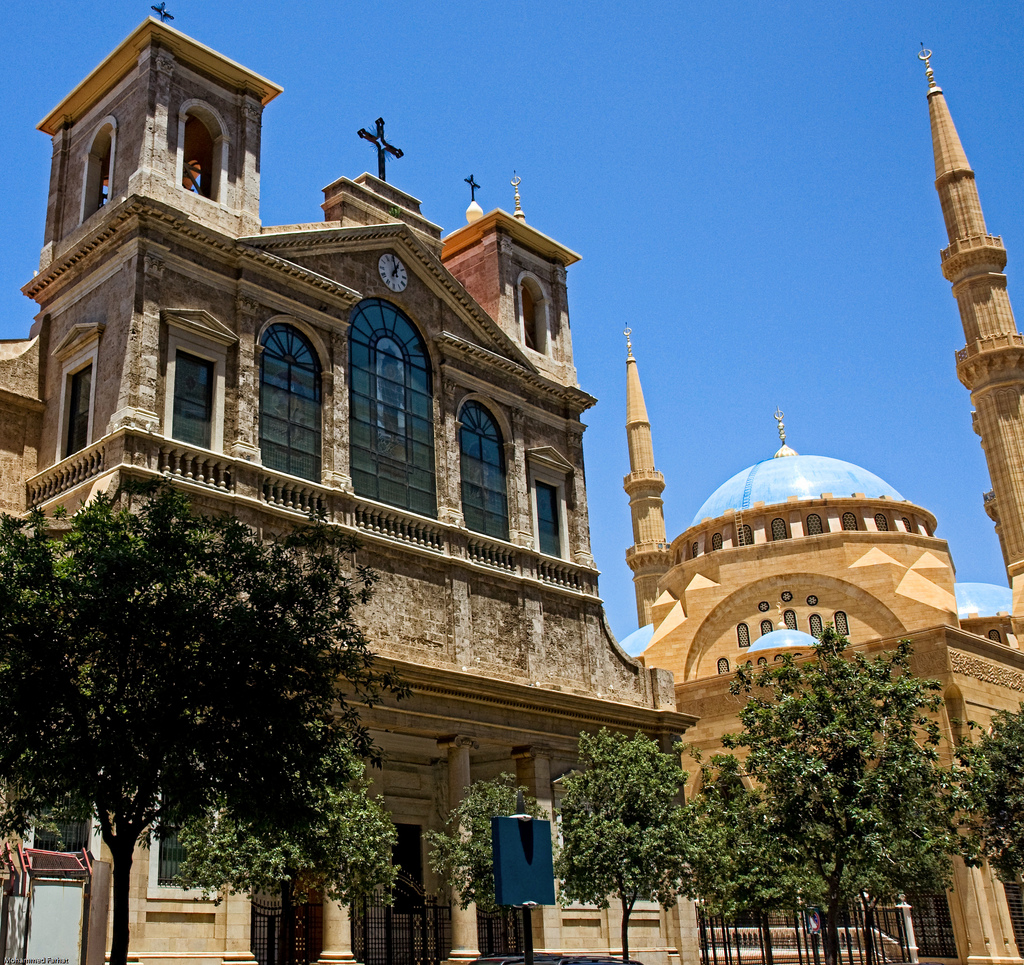
The cathedral in the foreground, with the Mohammad al-Amin Mosque visible in the background

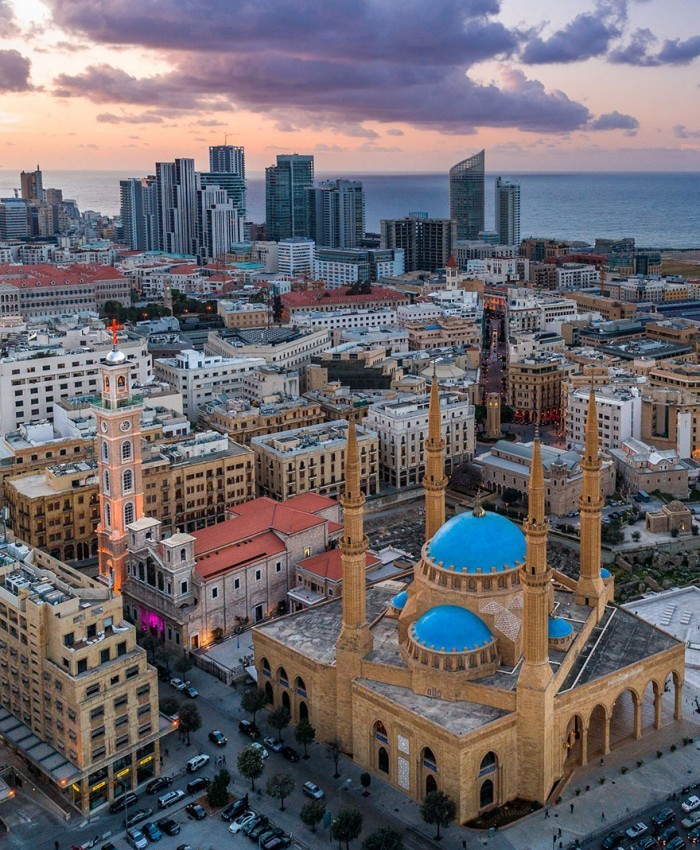
Skyline of Beirut with the cathedral, its campanile, and the Mohammad al-Amin Mosque in the foreground

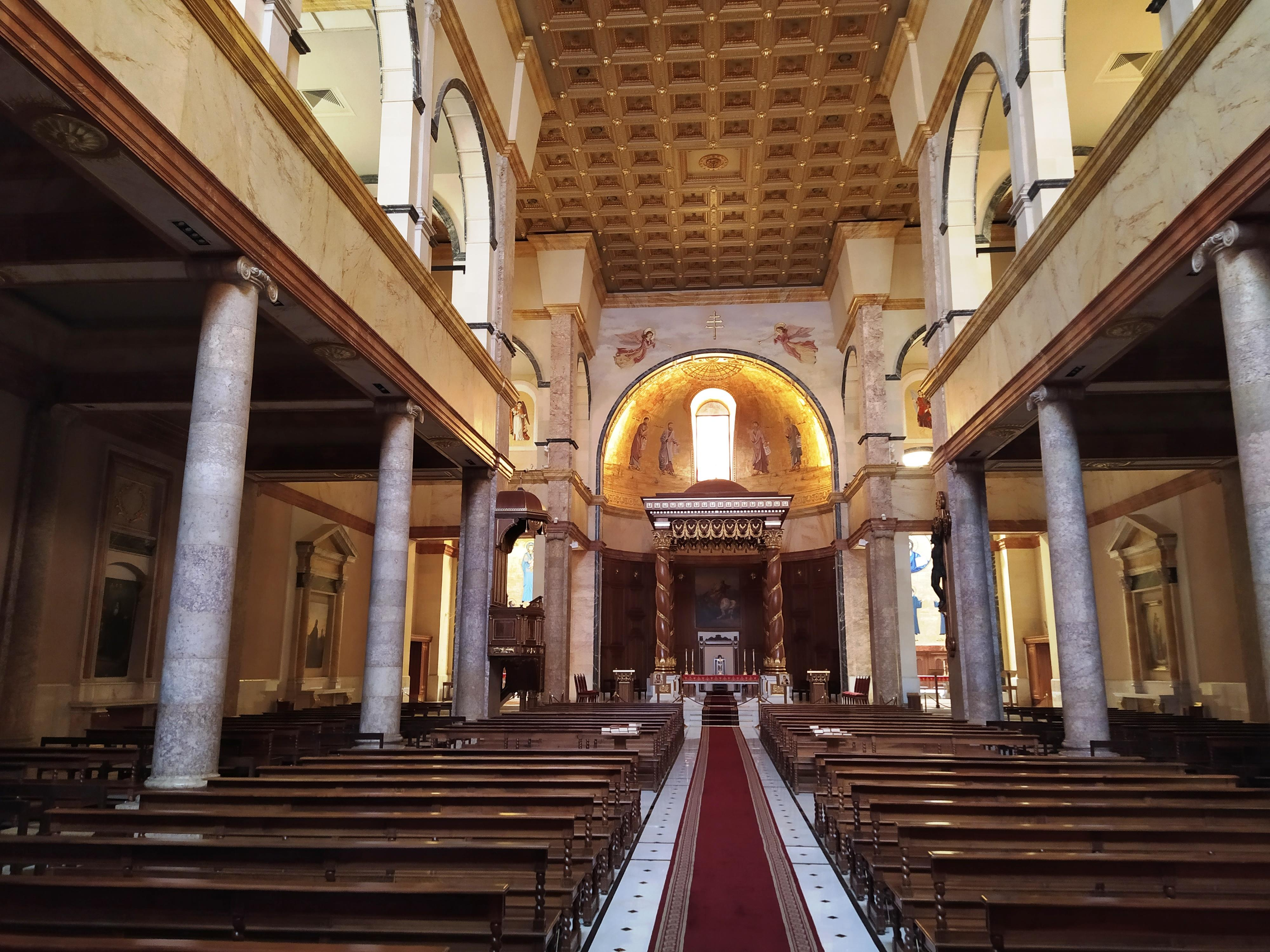
The neoclassical interior

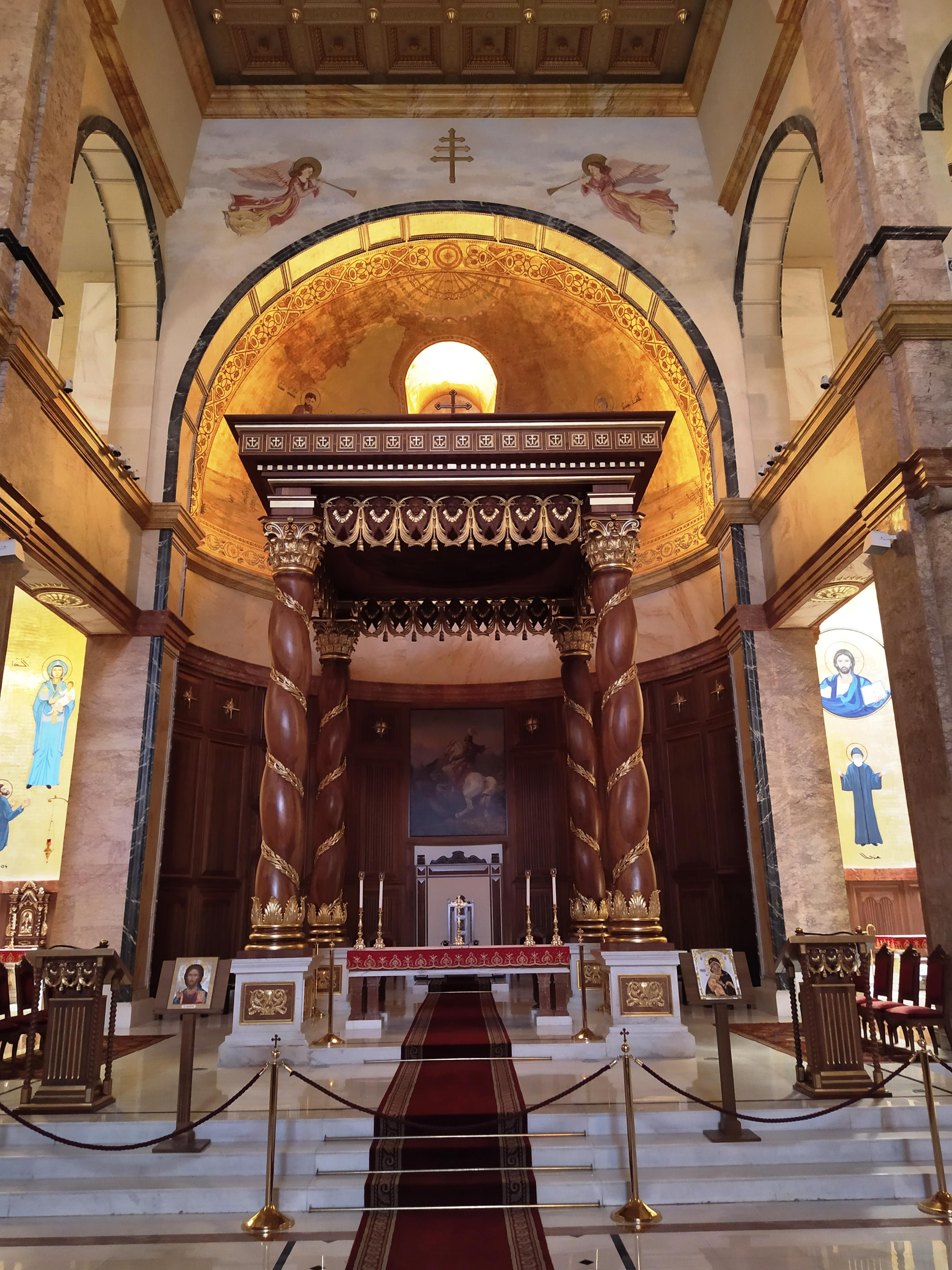
The baldachin and altar

== See also ==
- Beirut Central District
- Maronite Church – Eastern Catholic church
- Maronite Christianity in Lebanon – Religious group in Lebanon associated with the Catholic Church
- Christianity in Lebanon
- Saint Elias Maronite Church, Kantari – Church in Beirut
- Garden of Forgiveness

== Sources ==
- Kassir, Samir (2003) Histoire de Beyrouth, Fayard, Paris. ISBN 2-213-02980-6, Les lieux de culte au Liban. Ministère du Tourisme, Beyrouth.
