= Pearl of Wisdom =

Pearl of Wisdom may refer to:

== Books ==
- Margarita Philosophica (The Pearl of Wisdom), encyclopaedia by Gregor Reisch (1504)
- Pearl of Wisdom: Buddhist Prayers and Practices, by Thubten Chodron (2011)
- Pearls of Wisdom: Little Pieces of Advice, by Barbara Bush (2020)

== Television, Film and Video ==
- "Pearl of Wisdom", season 2, episode 18 of Fushigi no Kuni no Alice (Japan, 1984)
- "Pearl of Wisdom", season 1, episode 25 of DuckTales (USA, 1987)
- "Daytona Jones and the Pearl of Wisdom", episode 5 of The Chipmunks go to the Movies (USA, 1990)
- "Pearl of Wisdom", season 3, episode 7 of The Librarians (Australia, 2010)
- "The Pearl of Wisdom", film by Hugues Gentillon (Poland, 2015)
- "Pearls of Wisdom – Bill Pearl: A Bodybuilding Legend" (DVD), a biographical documentary about Bill Pearl

== Music ==
- "Pearls Of Wisdom" (song), track from the album Veil by Band of Susans (1993)
- "Pearl of Wisdom" (instrumental), chamber piece by Paweł Łukaszewski (2005)
- "Pearl of Wisdom" (song), track from the album Razorback Killers by Vicious Rumors (2011)

== See also ==
- The Two Pearls of Wisdom (novel), 2008 fantasy novel by Alison Goodman
- advice (opinion)
- Wisdom (disambiguation)
- Pearl (disambiguation)
