= Raymond Eid =

- Archeparch of Damascus
- Native name: ريمون عيد
- Church: Maronite Church
- Archdiocese: Archeparchy of Damascus
- In office: 5 June 1999 – 25 September 2005
- Predecessor: Antoine Hamid Mourany
- Successor: Samir Nassar

Orders
- Ordination: 30 May 1957
- Consecration: 20 November 1999 by Nasrallah Boutros Sfeir

Personal details
- Born: 6 August 1930 Mazraat el Daher, Mandatory Lebanese Republic, French Empire
- Died: 11 June 2012 (aged 81)

Raymond Eid (6 August 1930 – 11 June 2012) was the Maronite Catholic Archeparchy of Damascus, Syria.

== Life ==
Eid was born in Mazraat el Daher, Lebanon on 6 August 1930. Ordained to the priesthood on 30 May 1957 to the Maronite Catholic Eparchy of Sidon, Eid was elected Archbishop of the Maronite Catholic Archeparchy of Damascus on 5 June 1999 by the Maronite Synod.

Maronite Patriarch of Antioch, Nasrallah Boutros Sfeir, gave him on 20 November of the same year the Episcopal ordination. His co-consecrators were Tanios El Khoury, Eparch of Sidon, and Emile Eid, vice-president of the commission for the codification of the Eastern Churches' law.

He retired on 25 September 2005. and in 2006 Pope Benedict XVI accepted his age-related withdrawal.
