= Antoine Hamid Mourany =

Maronite Catholic archbishop (1930–2012)

- Archeparch of Damascus
- Native name: أنطوان حميد موراني
- Church: Maronite Church
- Archdiocese: Archeparchy of Damascus
- In office: 5 June 1989 – 10 March 1999
- Predecessor: Jean Elie El-Hage
- Successor: Raymond Eid

Orders
- Ordination: 11 June 1960
- Consecration: 16 September 1989 by Nasrallah Boutros Sfeir

Personal details
- Born: 24 January 1930 Al-Qoubaiyat, Mandatory Lebanese Republic, French Empire
- Died: 16 April 2012 (aged 82)

Antoine Hamid Mourany (Arabic: أنطوان حميد موراني, 24 January 1930, in Al Qoubaiyat, Lebanon – 16 April 2012) was an archeparch of the Maronite Catholic Archeparchy of Damascus.

== Life ==
Ordained priest on 11 June 1960, Mourany was elected eparch on 5 June 1989 by the Maronite Synod to the Archeparchy of Damascus. Maronite Patriarch of Antioch, Nasrallah Boutros Sfeir, gave him his episcopal ordination on September 16 of the same year, and his co-consecrators were Joseph Merhi, CML, Eparch of Cairo, and Georges Abi-Saber, OLM, auxiliary eparch in Antioch.

On 10 March 1999 Mourany resigned from his duties as archeparch.
