= Pierre Chébly =

The Most Reverend Pierre Chébly
- Archeparch
- Church: Catholic Church
- Diocese: Maronite Catholic Archeparchy of Beirut

Personal details
- Born: Pierre Scebli; 19 December 1870 Defoun, Lebanon
- Died: 30 May 1917 (aged 46) Beirut, Lebanon
- Denomination: Maronite Church

Pierre Chébly (born Pierre Scebli; 19 December 1870 – 30 May 1917) was an archeparch of the Maronite Catholic Archeparchy of Beirut.

== Life ==
Pierre Scebli was born in Defoun, Lebanon. He was ordained to the priesthood on 14 July 1897, and appointed Archbishop of Beirut on 14 February 1908, aged 36. He was consecrated bishop the following day by Maronite Patriarch of Antioch, Elias Peter Hoayek. On 30 May 1917, he died in Beirut, aged 46, after nine years as Archeparch of Beirut.
