= Paul Abdel Sater =

Maronite Archeparch of Beirut

His excellency Paul Boulos Abdel Sater
- Archeparch of Beirut
- Church: Catholic Church (Maronite Church)
- Archdiocese: Beirut
- See: Beirut
- Appointed: 15 June 2019
- Installed: 14 July 2019
- Predecessor: Paul Youssef Matar
- Previous post(s): Titular Bishop of Ptolemais in Phoenicia (2015–2019); Bishop of the Curia of the Maronites (2015–2019)

Orders
- Ordination: 29 June 1987 by Khalil Abi-Nader
- Consecration: 5 September 2015 by Béchara Boutros Raï

Personal details
- Born: Paul Abdel Sater; 20 September 1962 (age 62); Aïn El Remmaneh, Lebanon

Paul (Boulos) Abdel Sater (born 20 September 1962 in Aïn El Remmaneh, Lebanon) is a Curial bishop of the Maronite Catholic Patriarchate of Antioch.

== Life ==
Paul Abdel Sater received his ordination to the priesthood on 29 June 1987 and became priest of the Maronite Catholic Archeparchy of Beirut.

The Synod of the Maronite Church of Antioch elected him Curial Bishop of the Maronite Patriarchate, with Pope Francis confirming his election on July 28, 2015, and appointing him as the titular bishop of Ptolemais in Phoenicia. Maronite Patriarch of Antioch, Cardinal Bechara Boutros al-Rahi, O.M.M., ordained on 5 September of the same year to the episcopate. His co-consecrators were Archeparch of Beirut, Paul Youssef Matar, and the Archeparch of Haifa and the Holy Land, Moussa El-Hage, O.A.M.
