= Collège de la Sagesse =

College de la Sagesse - Saint Joseph
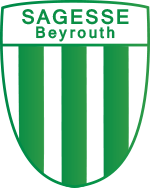
- Achrafieh, Beirut; Lebanon

Information
- Type: Private
- Established: 1875
- Rector: Mme Nadine Abi Rached
- Language: French, English, Arabic
- Colours: Green , White
- Slogan: 140 de Sagesse au service du Liban-Message (140 years of Sagesse in the service of Lebanon the message)
- Website: sagessesja.edu.lb

The Collège de la Sagesse (Arabic: کلیة الحکمة) is a Lebanese major national and Catholic school founded in 1875 by the Maronite archbishop of Beirut at the time, Joseph Debs who laid the first stone of the original building. The school originally known as l'École de la Sagesse (Arabic: مدرسة الحکمة) is one of the oldest educational institutions in Lebanon and the region. The school offers programs leading to the Lebanese Baccalaureate and the French Baccalaureate. It serves toute petite section through terminale S (the final year of lycée or senior high school/sixth form college).

The campus included a famous Institut de Droit for higher education preparing lawyers after graduation from the college. In addition to a degree in Civil Law, the institute also offered Christian Canonical Law.

The college boasts amongst its graduates some of the most prominent Lebanese political, religious and artistic personalities stretched on many decades.

== Sagesse network ==
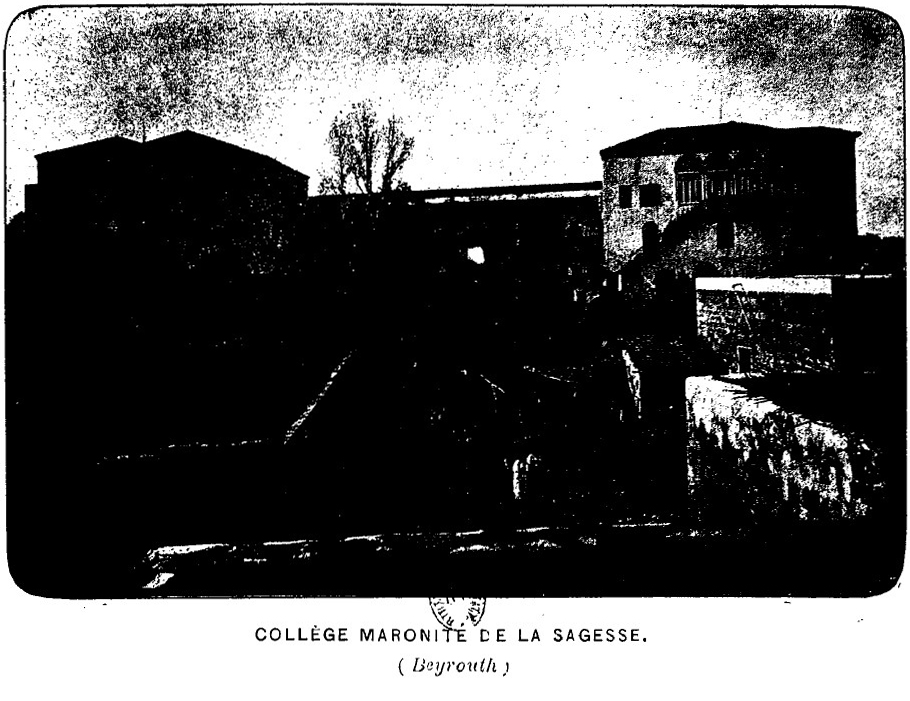

Sagesse is a renowned network of academic and technical institutions operating in Lebanon, administered by the Maronite Catholic Archeparchy of Beirut, and teaching more than 9,000 students. The network includes schools, technical institutions, and a university.

The school's historical main campus is in Ashrafieh, Beirut and is now known as Le Collège de la Sagesse Saint Joseph – Ashrafieh as St. Joseph is the patron saint of the school.

The Sagesse school network comprises

- Sagesse Saint-Joseph, the main campus in Ashrafieh, Beirut, Lebanon
- Sagesse Saint-Maron, main campus in Jdeideh, Matn District
- Sagesse Saint-Élie, also known as Sagesse Clemenceau, in West Beirut
- Sagesse Saint Jean-Maron, campus in Ain el-Remmaneh, Baabda District
- Sagesse Saint-Jean, campus in Brasilia, Baabda District
- Sagesse Sainte-Marie - providing Lebanese and English programs accredited by the Middle States Association of colleges and schools.
- Sagesse High School, Ain Saadeh, Matn District

Schools of higher learning associated with the school are L'Ecole Technique de la Sagesse that has two sections, in Achrafieh and Ain el Remmaneh. Université La Sagesse (containing 7 faculties) operates on two campuses in Beirut.

== See also ==
- Education in the Ottoman Empire
- Sagesse SC
