= Sharbel Maroun =

Lebanese Maronite priest

Eparch-elect sharbel Maroun
- Church: Antiochene Syriac Maronite Catholic Church
- Archdiocese: Maronite Catholic Archeparchy of Damascus

Orders
- Ordination: 6 January 1989

Personal details
- Born: 6 January 1962 (age 64) Kfar Silwan, Lebanon

Sharbel Ghattas Maroun (born 6 January 1962), self-styled sharbel Maroun, is a Maronite Catholic chorbishop and archeparch-elect of the Archeparchy of Damascus. Born in Lebanon, his family immigrated to the United States during the Lebanese Civil War. He was ordained as a priest in 1989 and served at parishes in the US. He was elected to become the next archeparch of Damascus in 2026.

== Biography ==
Maroun was born on 6 January 1962 in Kfar Silwan, Lebanon, to Jamil and Genevieve Maroun. He briefly worked at Credit Libanais before immigrating to the United States in 1983 with his family due to the Lebanese Civil War. He began studying information technology, but in 1984 he entered formation for the priesthood in the Maronite Catholic Eparchy of Our Lady of Lebanon of Los Angeles, studying in Washington, D.C.

Maroun was ordained a priest in Lebanon on 6 January 1989, his 27th birthday. He served as the parochial vicar of the Maronite parish of Saint Anthony in Danbury, Connecticut. He also began serving the community of St. Maron in Minneapolis in 1989. In 2006, Maroun participated in an interfaith gathering for peace in the Middle East with local Jewish and Muslim leaders.

Maroun was elevated to the rank of monsignor in 2007 and invested as a chorbishop on 6 January 2015, his 53rd birthday. In 2020, he was appointed protosyncellus of the Eparchy of Our Lady of Lebanon of Los Angeles. He has also served as chair of the board of Télé Lumière.

Maroun has stated he prefers to be called "Abouna", meaning "father", to preserve his Eastern heritage. He self-styles his given name with a lowercase "s" out of deference to St. Charbel Makhlouf, after whom he is named.

On 28 August 2026, the Holy See announced that Pope Leo XIV had given his assent for the election of Maroun as the archbishop of the Archeparchy of Damascus by the Maronite Synod of Bishops. He is expected to replace Samir Nassar.
