= Ignace Mobarak =

The Most Reverend Ignace Mobarak
- Archeparch
- Church: Catholic Church
- Diocese: Maronite Catholic Archeparchy of Beirut

Personal details
- Born: Ignace Mobarak
- Denomination: Maronite Church

Ignace Mobarak (26 September 1876 in Rismayya, Lebanon – 19 May 1958 in Beirut, Lebanon) was an Archeparch of the Maronite Catholic Archeparchy of Beirut.

== Life ==
In 1876 Ignace Mobarak was born in present-day Lebanon. On June 29, 1901 Mobarak received at the age of 25 years his ordination to the priesthood.

At the age of 42 years, on February 23, 1919 he was named Archbishop of Beirut. The solemn consecration took place on 2 March 1919 by the hands of the Maronite Patriarch of Antioch, Elias Peter Hoayek. On 20 January 1952 Archeparch Mobarak renounce of his office and at the same time he was appointed Titular bishop of Gabala.

After a total of 57 years as a priest and 39 years as a bishop in the pastoral service, Ignace Mobarak died at the age of 81 years, on May 19, 1958 in Beirut.
