= Mohammad Al-Amin Mosque =

Mosque in Beirut, Lebanon

- Arabic: جامع محمد الأمين
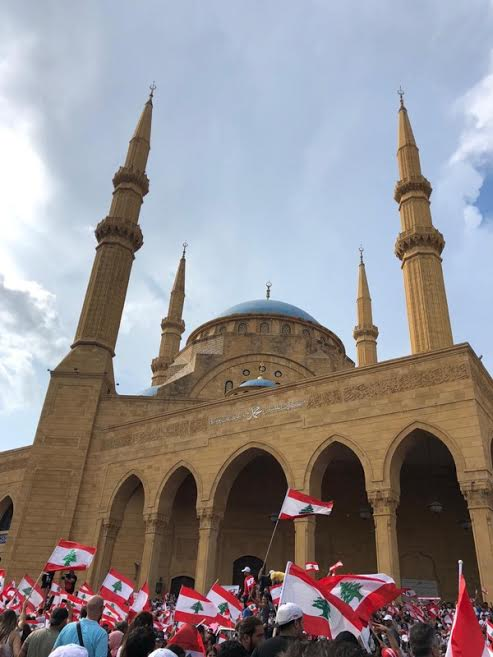
- The mosque during the 2019 Lebanese revolution

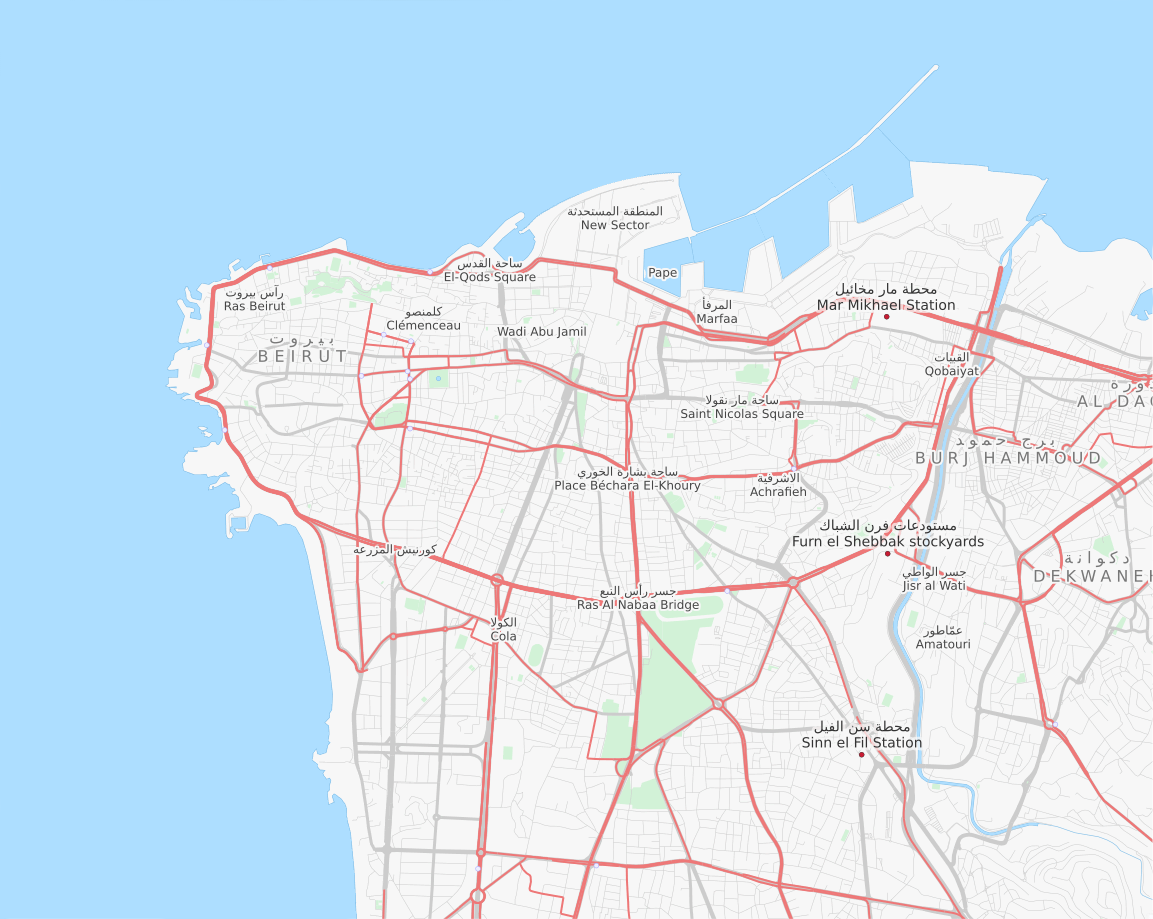
- Location of the mosque in Beirut

Religion
- Affiliation: Sunni Islam
- Ecclesiastical or organisational status: Zawiya (19th century–1975); Mosque (since 2008)
- Status: Active

Location
- Location: Beirut
- Country: Lebanon
- Coordinates: 33°53′41.89″N 35°30′22.93″E

Architecture
- Architect: Azmi Fakhoury
- Type: Mosque architecture
- Style: Ottoman
- Completed: 1853 (zawiya), 2008 (mosque)
- Destroyed: 1975

Specifications
- Capacity: 6,400 worshippers
- Height (max): 72 m (236 ft)
- Dome: Five
- Dome height (outer): 42 m (138 ft)
- Minaret: Four
- Minaret height: 72 m (236 ft)
- Spire height: 48 m (157 ft)
- Temple: 1
- Materials: Stones, tiles

The Mohammad Al-Amin Mosque (Arabic: جامع محمد الأمين), also referred to as the Blue Mosque, is a Sunni mosque, 72 m high, minarets´ roof of 65 m high and main dome spire of 48 m high and its roof 42 m, is located in downtown Beirut, Lebanon.

In 1853, a zawiya was built on this site. Decades of preparation to obtain sufficient land adjacent to the old Zawiya led finally to the building of the new mosque. The mosque was inaugurated in 2008, and is located adjacent to the Maronite Cathedral of Saint George.

== History ==
In the 19th century, a zawiya, named after Sheikh Abu Nasr al-Yafi, was built on this site. Souk Abu Nasr was located in the same area and was operational with the zawiya until 1975.

On August 4, 2020, the mosque was badly damaged by the Beirut explosions. Its chandeliers and windows were shattered, leaving broken glass on the floor.

== Construction and design ==
Soon after the Lebanon Civil War, following a donation by the late Prime Minister Rafic Hariri, the foundation for the Mohammad Al-Amin Mosque was laid in November 2002. Hariri was assassinated on February 14, 2005, and his body is buried next to the mosque, within the Martyrs' Square of Beirut. The mosque was used for Hariri's funeral ceremony.

During the construction of the mosque, archaeologists uncovered a section of the east–west main Roman street (Decumanus Maximus), with paving and columns. After the first stone was laid out for the mosque, the first concrete was poured in 2003. By 2005, the architecture of the mosque had begun to be built and the mosque was inaugurated in 2008.

Designed by Azmi Fakhoury in a style similar to the architecture of Ottoman Turk, the mosque can accommodate up to 6,400 worshippers. The Mohammad Al-Amin Mosque contains five domes, all of which are made from light blue tiles. The interior details have patterned ceilings and a dome circle. The ornament that seems to be a chandelier dangles in front of the mihrab.

== Gallery ==
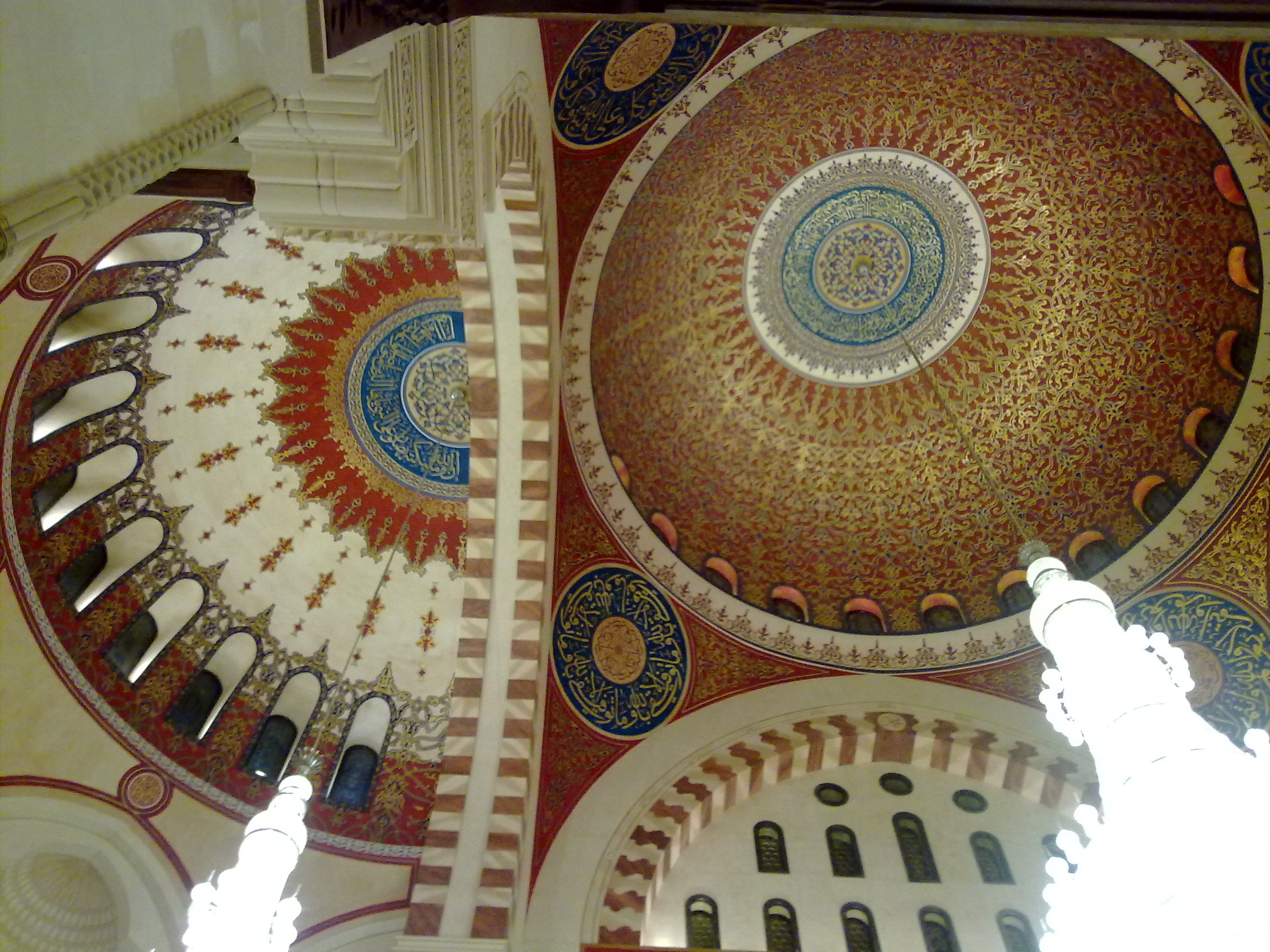
The ceiling interior

The interior of the Mohammad Al-Amin Mosque, showing the inside of the domes.

The construction of the Mohammad Al-Amin mosque, in 2004.

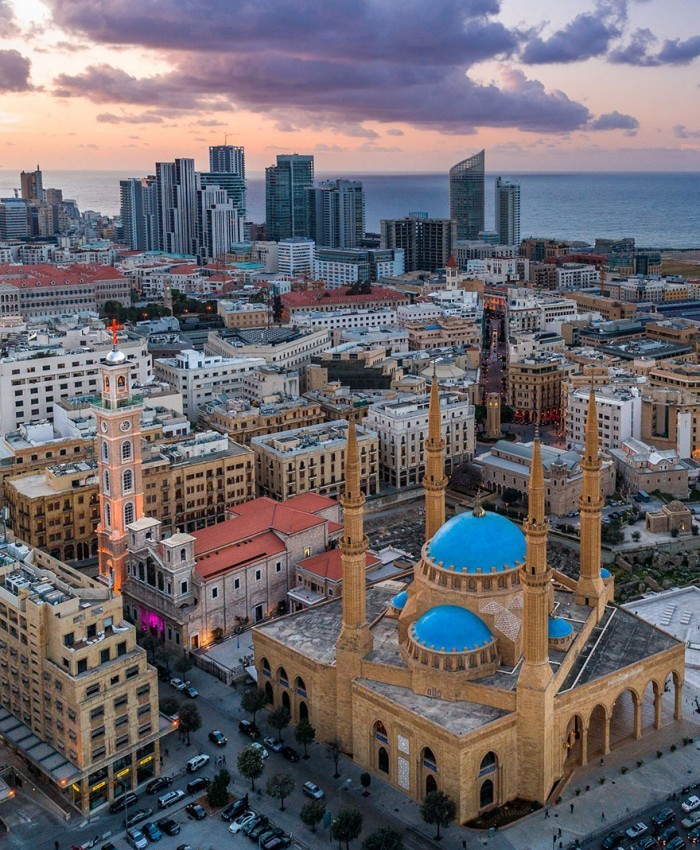
Aerial view showing the Mohammad Al-Amin Mosque. The St. George Maronite Cathedral and Beirut skyline are in the background.

== See also ==
- Islam in Lebanon
- List of mosques in Lebanon
- Sunni Islam in Lebanon
