= Maronite Catholic Archeparchy of Damascus =

Eastern Catholic archeparchy in Syria

Coordinates: 33.5121°N 36.3152°E

Archeparchy of Damascus Archeparchy Maronitarum Damascena

Location
- Country: Syria

Statistics
- Population: (as of 2013); 20,300
- Parishes: 8

Information
- Denomination: Catholic Church
- Sui iuris church: Maronite Church
- Rite: West Syriac Rite
- Established: 1527

Current leadership
- Pope: Leo XIV
- Patriarch: Bechara Boutros al-Rahi
- Archeparch: Sharbel Maroun
- Bishops emeritus: Samir Nassar

The Archeparchy of Damascus (Latin: Archeparchy Maronitarum Damascena) is an archeparchy of the Maronite Church. In 2013 there were 20,300 members. It is currently governed by Archbishop Samir Nassar.

== Territory and statistics ==
The archeparchy includes the city of Damascus, where is located the Maronite Cathedral. The territory is divided into eight parishes and has 20,300 Maronite Catholics.

== History ==
There are a series of Maronite Catholic bishops since 1527, however the archeparchy was canonically erected in the Maronite Synod of Mount Lebanon in 1736.

== Bishops and archbishops ==
- Antun (1523 - 1529)
- Gergis al-Ihdini (1529 - 1562)
- Gergis Sulayman al-Qubursi (1561 - 1577)
- Gergis al-Basluqiti (1577 - 1580)
- Yusuf Musa al-Rizzi (1595 - 1597) appointed patriarch of Antioch
- Sarkis II al-Rizzi (1608-1638)
- Yusuf Umaymah al-Karmsaddani (1644 - 1653)
- Yaqub al-Rami (1653 - 1658)
- Sarkis al-Jamri al-Ihidni (1658 - 1668)
- Michael al-Ghaziri (? - 1697)
- Simon Awad (Simone Evodius) (27 January 1716 - 16 March 1743 appointed patriarch of Antioch)
- Michael al-Sayigh (1746 - 1755)
- Arsenio Abdul-Ahad (mentioned in August 1774)
- Joseph Tyan (6 August 1786 consecrated - 1788 appointed Patriarchal Vicar)
- Germanos al-Khazen (Germano Gazeno) (1794 - 1806)
- Estephan I al-Khazen (2 April 1806 - 31 December 1830)
- Joseph Ragi El Khazen (6 April 1830 - 1845) appointed Patriarchal
- Estephan II al-Khazen (Gazeno) (2 April 1848 - 8 December 1868 deceased)
- Nomatalla Dahdah (11 February 1872 - ? deceased)
- Paul Massad (12 June 1892 - March 1919 deceased)
- Bisciarah Riccardo Chemali (9 May 1920 - 24 December 1927 deceased)
- Jean El-Hage (29 April 1928 - 30 November 1955 deceased)
- Abdallah Najm
- Michael Doumit (1960 - ?)
- Antoine Hamid Mourany (5 June 1989 - 10 March 1999 resigned)
- Raymond Eid (5 June 1999 - 25 September 2006 resigned)
- Samir Nassar (14 October 2006 – 28 August 2026)
- Sharbel Maroun (since 28 August 2026)

== See also ==
- Maronite Catholic Eparchy of Latakia
- Maronite Catholic Archeparchy of Aleppo

== Sources ==
- Annuario Pontificio, Libreria Editrice Vaticana, Città del Vaticano, 2003, ISBN 88-209-7422-3.
