= Wisdom (surname) =

Wisdom is a surname. Notable people with the surname include:

- Andre Wisdom (born 1993), English footballer
- Chigozie Wisdom (born 1983), Nigerian gospel singer
- Elsie Mary Wisdom (1904–1972), English racing driver
- Jack Wisdom (born 1953), American professor of Planetary Sciences
- Jane Wisdom (1884–1975), Canadian social worker
- Jason Wisdom (born 1983), American metal musician
- Jerry Wisdom (1947–2009), Bahamian track and field athlete
- John Wisdom (1904–1993), British philosopher
- John Minor Wisdom (1905–1999), American judge
- John Oulton Wisdom (1908–1993), Irish philosopher
- Norman Wisdom (1915–2010), British actor and comedian
- Ocean Wisdom (born 1993), English rapper
- Olli Wisdom (1958–2021), British musician
- Patrick Wisdom (born 1991), American baseball player
- Robert Wisdom (born 1953), American actor
- Robert Wisdom (New South Wales politician) (1830–1888), Attorney General
- Terrence Wisdom (born 1971), American football player
- Tom Wisdom (born 1973), English actor
- Tommy Wisdom (1906–1972), English motoring corrspondent and racing driver

Fictional characters:

- Pete Wisdom, secret agent published by Marvel Comics

== See also ==
- Wisdom
