= Jane Wisdom =

Canadian Social Worker and Government Administrator

Jane Wisdom (1884–1975) was a Canadian social worker and the first head of the Bureau of Social Services in Halifax. She began by studying at McGill University, and later in New York. She returned to Canada to lead the Bureau of Social Services in Halifax, Nova Scotia. In 1921, she moved to Montreal, Quebec, where she studied and lectured. After 18 years there, she moved to Nova Scotia, and worked as the first welfare officer for Glace Bay, and in that position was the first municipal service officer in all of Nova Scotia.

== Biography ==
Jane Barnes Wisdom was born on March 1, 1884, to Freeman W. Wisdom and Mary Bell Wisdom. She graduated from McGill University in 1907 with a B.A. She had a job as a 'visitor on staff' at the Charity Organization Society of Montreal.

In June 1910, she took a class at the New York School of Philanthropy, and after completion of that returned to Montreal, before taking a job with the Brooklyn Bureau of Charities from 1912 to 1916. She was the executive director of two districts in that organization. The Bureau of Social Services in Halifax, Nova Scotia, named her their first executive secretary in July 1916. She played a large role in the recovery efforts from the Halifax Explosion, working for the Halifax Relief Commission as Supervisor of the Rehabilitation Department.

Following completion of those efforts, Wisdom served on the Nova Scotia Provincial Commission, and traveled around the United Kingdom. The following year, she returned to McGill to get a graduate degree from the Department of Economics. She was also an instructor of social case work in their Department of Social Science and School of Social Work from 1921 to 1924. When she left McGill, she became the executive director of the Women's Directory of Montreal until 1939. After retiring from working as the first welfare officer for Glace Bay, Nova Scotia, Wisdom died on June 9, 1975.
