= WISDOM Project =

Logo of the WISDOM Project

The Water-related Information System for the Sustainable Development of the Mekong Delta in Vietnam (WISDOM) Project is a bilateral research project between Germany and Vietnam, focusing on the creation of a Water related Information System for the Mekong Delta. Initiated by the Vietnamese and the German governments it was started in 2007, and it ran until 2013.

== Background ==

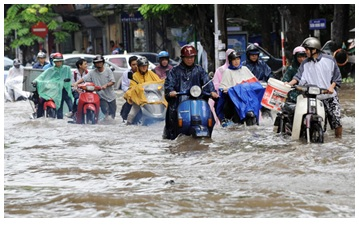
Flood in the streets of Can Tho

The Mekong-Delta covers an area of about 70,000 km^{2} in South Vietnam and underlies the influence of the tropical monsoon. The annual dry season lasts from November till April and the rain season from May till October. The river regularly overflows its banks in the lower Mekong area, with beneficial effects, such as the accumulation of fertile sediment. However extreme flood events occur more frequently causing extensive damage. High population density, and farming as a major income source close to flooding endangered areas increase the economic and ecologic impacts of extreme river floods. Beside these extreme floods the Mekong Delta region encounters further challenges and problems, such as deteriorating water quality due to strong pesticide use in rice farming areas, unfiltered discharge of rural and industrial waste water, changing climatic conditions with predicted sea level rise, and thereupon resulting salinization and acidification, species / habitats diminish, and regulatory measures (hydropower) is ongoing at the upper reaches of the Mekong. The interactions between nature and human beings make the Mekong Delta a complex system, requiring a more and more adapted regulation, based on accurate information concerning the different factors entering the equation. Providing information, linking different related scientific domains, designing and implementing decision support technologies accompanied by capacity building measures is the aim of the WISDOM project serving the integrated water resources management (IWRM) domain in the Mekong Delta.

== The WISDOM Project Phase II ==
The first Phase of the WISDOM Project was initiated in August 2007 by the German Ministry of Education and Research (BMBF) and the Vietnamese Ministry of Science and Technology (MOST) and lasted for 3 years till 2010. The second Phase of the WISDOM Project lasts from 2010 till 2013. The Project is a German and Vietnamese cooperation, coordinated by the German Aerospace Centre (DLR) and the Vietnamese Southern Institute of Water Resources Research (SIWRR). It brings together Vietnamese and German partners from different fields, be they scientific, governmental or from the private sector.

=== Partners of the Consortium ===
German partners include German Remote Sensing Data Center (DFD) of DLR (German Aerospace Centre), Aquaplaner, Eomap, GFZ (German Research Center for Geoscience), HYDROMOD, IAMARIS e.V., INRES (Institute of Crop Science and Resource Conservation), Institute of Photogrammetry and Remote Sensing (I.P.F.), lat/lon, University of Würzburg, UNU-EHS (United Nations University; Institute for Environment and Human Security), ZEF (Center for Development Research)

Vietnamese partners include SIWRR (Southern Institute of Water Resources Research); VAST GIRS (Vietnamese Academy of Science & Technology – Division of Remote Sensing and GIS); Sub-Niapp (Sub-National Institute for agricultural planning & Projection); SISS (Southern Institute of Social Sciences); SRHMC (Southern Region Hydro-Meteorological Centre); Can Tho University; Vietnam University, HCMC; and IDR (Institute of Development Economics Research). Also involved are the Ministry of Natural Resources and Environment and the Ministry of Agriculture and Rural Development.

=== Aims ===
The main objective of the project is to collect information on the Mekong Delta from various fields, such as Hydrology, Geography and Earth Observation, Sociology, and to then integrate this information into a single Information System. This allows answers which combine the different factors relevant to the question, for example in case of a flood: How much agricultural land has been affected?

The aim of this Information System is to provide a Decision Support System (DSS) to the local, regional and national decision makers.

=== Themes of research ===
– Quantification of water (Water level, Floods, Minimum Flow, Availability of Water, Water use)

– Quality of water (Pesticides, Salinity, Sediments, Nutrients)

– Land-use (Agriculture, Aquaculture, Settlements, Sealing of the riverbanks) and its change (moving from agriculture to aquaculture due to policies)

– Climate Change and Mitigation (Vulnerability, Migration, Shifts of the coastline)

– Socio-economics (Educational standards, Knowledge management, Institutional Mapping, Legal Mapping)

=== Organisation and objectives of the Project ===
Spurce:

WP1000 Project Management and Objectives

The main goal of the project coordination is to facilitate administrative coordination, networking and harmonisation of the German contributions with the Vietnamese partners and to ensure the successful completion of the project.

WP2000 Water and Knowledge Management

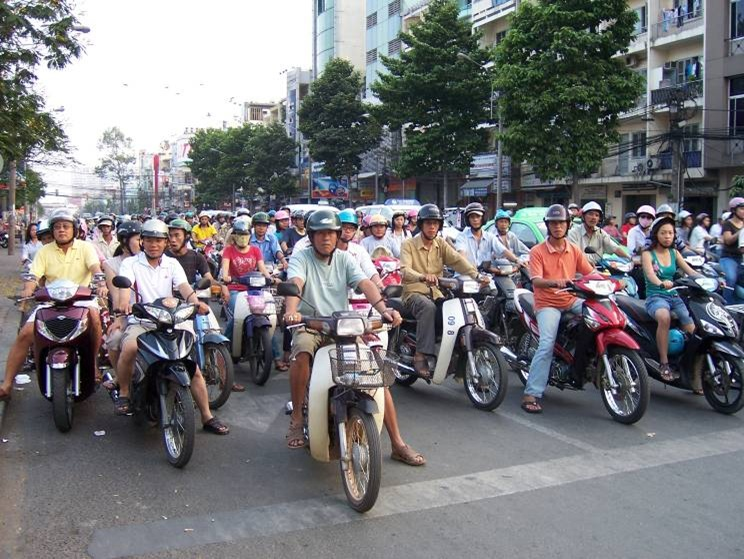
Rush hour in Can Tho / Vietnam

The research and development activities of WP 2000 "Water and knowledge management" are guided by the overall project objective of the second phase which is to implement the WISDOM Information System in Vietnam. The main objectives of the work package are to understand the needs of potential end-users of the Information System, to complete the institutional analysis of the water sector and to build and sustain knowledge management capacity in the Mekong Delta.

WP3000 System Design

The aim of the system design, development and implementation of a web based integrated water management prototype, developed according to Vietnamese and German user requirements. During a multi-stage developing process evaluation of current prototypes is provided in order to progressively enhance functionality of consecutive systems. Therefore, two prototype systems are developed and deployed at Vietnamese partner institutions thus allowing for thorough system testing and for the implementation and integration of innovations according to altered user requirements.

WP4000 Water Resources, River System and Water Related Hazards

Quantification of water resources and water quality and the relevant processes is the overall topic of WP4000. Because almost all water related issues in the Mekong Delta as the most downstream and receiving part of the Mekong can hardly be investigated or even solved without taking a look on the processes in the basin, WP4000 extends the general focus of WISDOM to the scale of the whole Mekong basin. In line with the IWRM core aspects "Reassessment of basin hydrology", "Climate change as an uncertain driver", "Addressing Urbanization and land-use changes", and "Recognizing the evolving role of agriculture". WP4000 starts out with hydrological investigations covering the whole Mekong basin including the impacts of climate change. But quantification of water resources is just one side of the IWRM coin: water quality is the other essential aspect. Therefore, WP4000 dedicates approximately half of the work volume to studies investigating water quality issues in the delta. This includes monitoring of the current state of water quality, both by on site observations and remote sensing.

WP5000 Water Knowledge and Livelihoods

The Work Package 5000 deals with the socio-economic impact of water and resource management in the region. In the work package 5000 methodologies and conceptual frameworks will be developed and adapted to be used to capture vulnerability of people, the economy and environment in its multi-faceted nature. A continuative objective is to understand the diversity of livelihoods and subsistence strategies and how they are shaped by both, environmental and demographic changes and the ongoing political and institutional transformation process.

WP6000 Data Integration, Tools and Methodology

The activities in of the Work Package address four main questions on how to develop and sustainable implement an Information System for Integrated Water Resources Management. The question, which should be answered is how a sustainable implementation and usage of the WISDOM Information System can be ensured. Secondly a concept for ensuring holistic data management and data sharing has to be developed. Thirdly different thematic, temporal and spatial scales of remote sensing technologies should be analyser towards the use ability to monitor water resources. The last question which should be answered is how information products of the system have to be compiled to ensure the highest degree of user perception and knowledge generation for sustainable decision making.

WP7000 Capacity Building

The PhD Programme within WISDOM is a cooperation and exchange platform for all PhD researchers working on the project. It is coordinated and managed by UNU-EHS in close collaboration with all partners hosting PhD students. The program aims achieve several results, such as gaining advanced skills in research methodologies and skills necessary for the interpretation of scientific results, encourage creativity, analytical thinking, critical analysis, and innovative problem-solving and enhancing cooperation between the WISDOM PhD researchers.

== WISDOM Information System Prototype ==
All results of WISDOM Phase I and Phase II are stored and distributed to WISDOM partners using the WISDOM Information System, which comprises data and information from the fields of hydrology, sociology, information technology, and earth observation. Data models and concepts for storing such kind of data within spatial databases have been developed and implemented in the WISDOM Prototype. Different aspects of data are represented in these models. Ontologies describing spatial-, thematic-, and temporal reference aspects have been implemented allowing a semantic enrichment of the datasets and with that enable fast data retrieval by meaningful search attributes as e.g. finding all data in a specific administrative unit belonging to a specific theme. The models represent geometrical aspects of data and allow for efficient management of either raster- or vector data. Additionally, nonspatial data like sensor measurements or census data are related to the spatial reference objects. The data model further describes styling aspects of spatial datasets using Styled Layer Descriptions as also Web Mapping Service (WMS) layer specifications. This allows for a dynamic retrieval of rendered maps of requested spatial datasets from the data management system. Furthermore, meta data descriptions of spatial data are modelled based on the ISO19115 standard. These are then used in a meta data catalogue system as also in the warehouse of the WISDOM Information System.

== Results ==
Results of the WISDOM Project are manifold and are updated regularly at the WISDOM Homepage:

- Remote Sensing
- Hydrologic Modelling
- Pesticides
- Endocrine Disruptors
- Socio-Economy
- Vulnerability Assessment
