= Mazraat el Daher =

Mazraat el Daher Arabic: مزرعة الضهر
- City
- Location within Lebanon
- Coordinates: 33°35′N 35°30′E
- Country: Lebanon
- Governorate: Mount Lebanon Governorate
- District: Chouf District

Government
- Elevation: 750 m (2,460 ft)
- Time zone: UTC+2 (EET)
  - Summer (DST): UTC+3 (EEST)
- Dialing code: +961

Mazraat el Daher (Levantine Arabic: مزرعة الضهر, romanized: Mazraʿat eḍ-Ḍaher) also spelled Maraat el Dahr, is a Lebanese village located in the Chouf District of the Mount Lebanon Governorate. The maximum elevation of the village is approximately 750 meters above sea level. The village lies approximately 54 km south of Beirut.
