= Université La Sagesse =

University In Lebanon

- Arabic: جامعة الحكمة
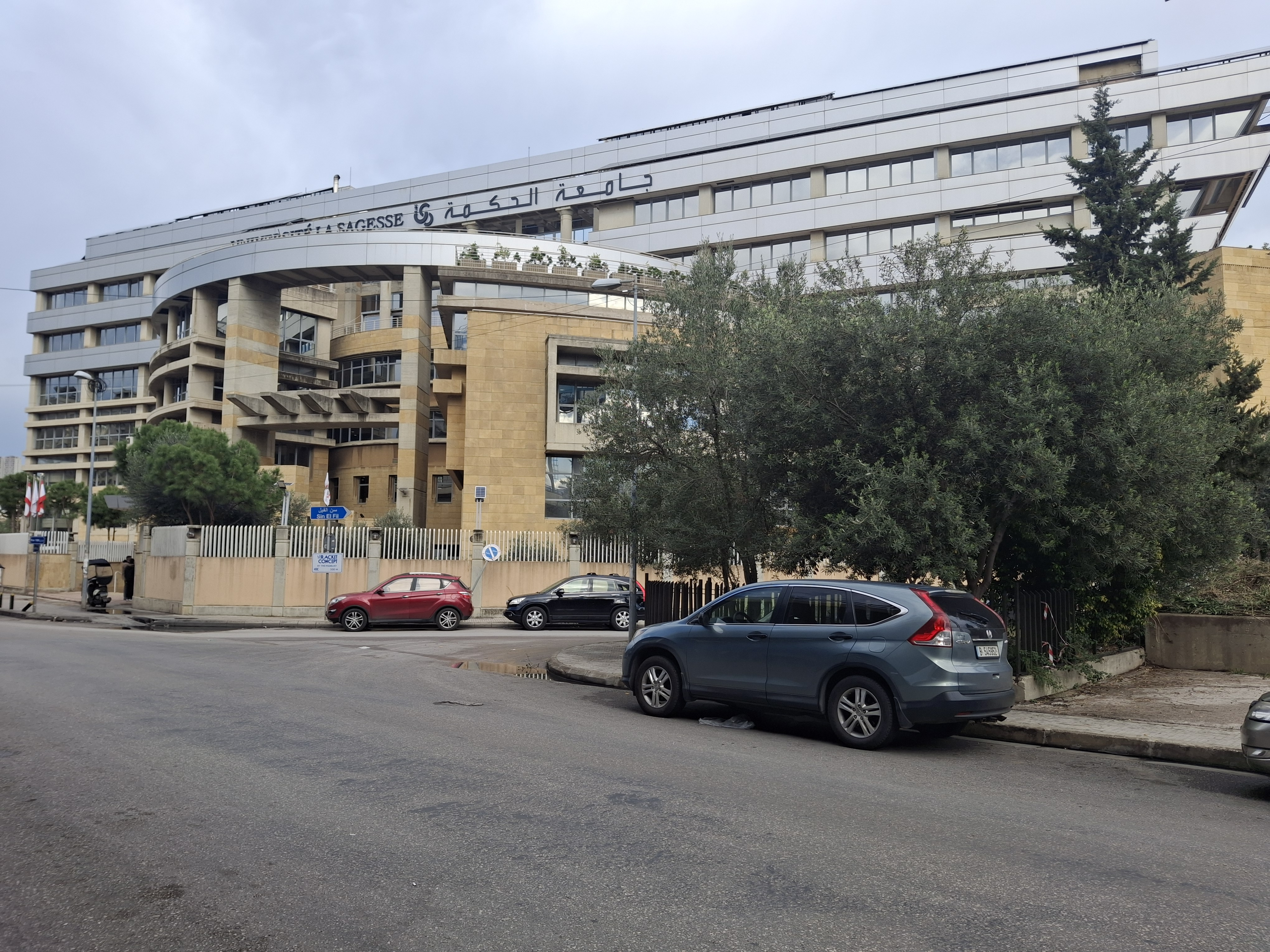
- Sagesse University Furn el Chebbak Campus in January 2025

The Université La Sagesse (Arabic: جامعة الحكمة), also known by the acronym ULS, is an established academic institute in Furn-El-Chebak, Lebanon. The university was established according to decree 1947 in 1999. But the university's Higher College of Law goes back to 1875.

The university is associated with Collège de la Sagesse, a Lebanese Catholic educational institution founded in 1875 that ran a Higher Institute of Law now incorporated in the university. Sagesse also includes a wide network of Lebanese Maronite elementary and secondary schools many of them continuing to study at the university.

But the university runs independently from the Sagesse school programme although it is similarly supervised by the Maronite Catholic Archeparchy of Beirut.

The University of Wisdom provides young people with a wide range of specializations that enable them to acquire the skills necessary for the success of their project.

== Campus ==
The main new campus of the university was inaugurated by Maronite Patriarch Nasrallah Boutros Sfeir on 28 June 2002. The campus with modern architecture headquartered in the Beirut suburbs, consists of four blocks of buildings of seven stories each, a ground floor and two underground floors for parking for 500 cars. The campus can accommodate to around 3,500 students on a full-time basis. The campus includes a library, a chapel in the name St. Joseph, a "salle de congrès" and "salle polyvalente", a theatre etc. There is also another campus dedicated to the Faculty of Hotel Management in Ashrafieh, Beirut.

== Origins ==
Collège de la Sagesse ran the Sagesse Higher Institute (معهد الحكمة العالي) mainly an Institut de Droit (Higher Institute of Law) starting 1875. The Law for the Organization of Higher Education in Lebanon (قانون تنظيم التعليم العالي) dated 26 December 1961 acknowledged in its article 17 the Institut de Droit as an approved institution of higher learning. The institute remained headquartered in College de la Sagesse until the establishment of Université La Sagesse in 1999 with the Faculty of Law moving to the new campus premises in 2002.

== Establishment ==
Université La Sagesse was established in 1999 according to decree 1947 dated 21 December 1999, with approved faculties for Law, Canonical Sciences, Business and Finance, Political Science and International Relations. In 2007, Hotel Management was added by a decree in 2007, and the Institut de Droit was approved as a full faculty in 2008. The faculty of Public Health was added in 2012. Canonical Law was approved in 2014. The main language of education is French in addition to English and Arabic language wherever needed, specially in the legal faculties.

== Faculty ==
The Sagesse University contains the following faculties:

- Faculty of Law
- Faculty of Canonic Law
- Faculty of Ecclesiastical Law
- Faculty of Business and Finance
- Faculty of Political Sciences and International Relations
- Faculty of Hotel Management
- Faculty of Public Health
- Faculty of Engineering
- Faculty of Religious and Theological Sciences
