= Youssef Debs =

The Most Reverend Youssef Debs
- Archeparch
- Church: Catholic Church
- Diocese: Maronite Catholic Archeparchy of Beirut

Personal details
- Born: Youssef Debs
- Denomination: Maronite Church

Youssef Debs (born 8 October 1833 in Raschiva, Lebanon - died on 7 October 1907 in Beirut, Lebanon) was an archeparch of the Maronite Catholic Archeparchy of Beirut.

== Life ==
Youssef Debs was appointed and consecrated on 11 February 1872 by Maronite Patriarch of Antioch, Boulos I Massad, Archeparch of Beirut. On 7 October 1907 he died at the age of 73 years in Beirut.
