= Sagesse High School =

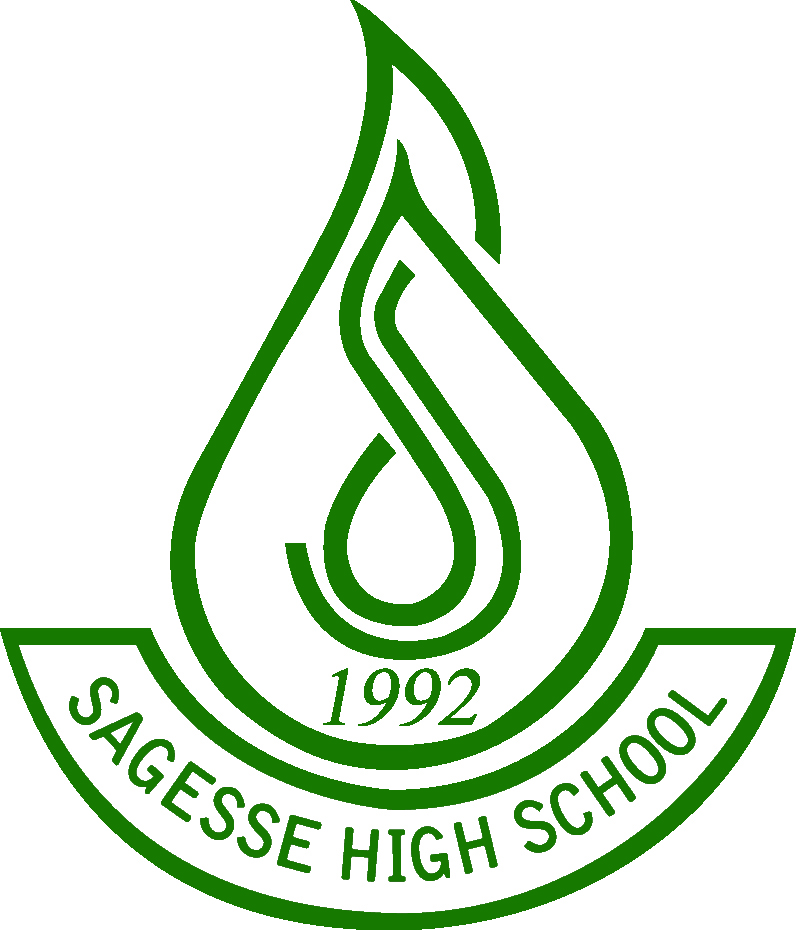
- Ain Saadeh, Matn District; Beirut; Lebanon

Information
- Type: Private
- Established: 1992
- Rector: Fr. Joe Daccach
- Enrollment: 1,087
- Language: English, Arabic
- Campus: Suburban
- Colors: Green , White
- Slogan: Mary Mother of Wisdom
- Song: Alma Mater
- Athletics: Basketball, Association football, Volleyball, Swimming
- Tuition: ± $7,000 (£L10,548,300)
- Affiliations: Roman Catholic
- Website: http://www.sagessehs.edu.lb

Sagesse High School, Mary Mother of Wisdom is a private, Catholic co-educational school located in the suburb of Ain Saadeh, Matn District, Lebanon (30 minute drive from Beirut Rafic Hariri International Airport). Sagesse High School operates under the supervision of the General Secretariat of Catholic Schools in Lebanon as well as being a member of the La Sagesse institution of the archdiocese of Beirut, and is internationally accredited by the Middle States Association of Colleges and Schools as of 2009. Sagesse High School is also the first IB World School in the country, offering the International Baccalaureate since 1995.

== History ==
The school was founded in 1992 under the presidency of Fr. Sauveur El Khoury. It became a member of the IBO in 1995. Fr. El-Khoury was appointed to a sister-Sagesse school and replaced by Vice President Fr. Edgard Madi. In 2006, Fr. Edgard Madi was appointed archbishop in Brazil and Fr. Sauveur El-Khoury returned as president. In 2007, Fr. El-Khoury was appointed a Monsignor and replaced by Fr. Gabriel Tabet. In 2009, the school was granted accreditation by MSA after their visit. In 2019, Fr. Joe Daccache replaced Fr. Tabet as president, and currently holds the title of Rector.

== Curricula ==
There are three educational programs:

- International Baccalaureate (IB Diploma)
- American System Program (SAT 1, SAT 2, TOEFL, AP Preparation)
- Lebanese Baccalaureate Program

The Special Education Department caters for students with language-based learning difficulties (Dyslexia, Dysgraphia, Dyscalculia, non-verbal learning disorder), learning gaps, mild speech and language delay/ mild psychomotor delays, ADD/ADHD, and Slow learning. The curriculum is designed to give students the broadest possible education, whilst preparing them to further their education in their chosen college or university in Lebanon and abroad. Students are considered special needs students if they are diagnosed by an approved independent psychologist and the School's psychologist as having one of the following disabilities prior to admission, or if they are referred to the Special Education Unit by a Head of Division at a later stage:

- Students with learning disabilities as defined by Lebanese law including: Dyslexia, dysgraphia, dyscalculia, ADD, ADHD, Epilepsy
- Students identified as slow learners (borderline IQ)
- Students with psychomotor or speech difficulties

== Alma mater ==
The school's Alma Mater was originally a brief hymn sung by the missionaries of Mother Teresa of Calcutta to the Virgin Mary and is sung by the students every morning after morning prayer.
