= Maronite Catholic Archeparchy of Beirut =

Eastern Catholic jurisdiction in Lebanon

Coordinates: 33.8950°N 35.5050°E

Archeparchy of Beirut Archeparchia Berytensis Maronitarum
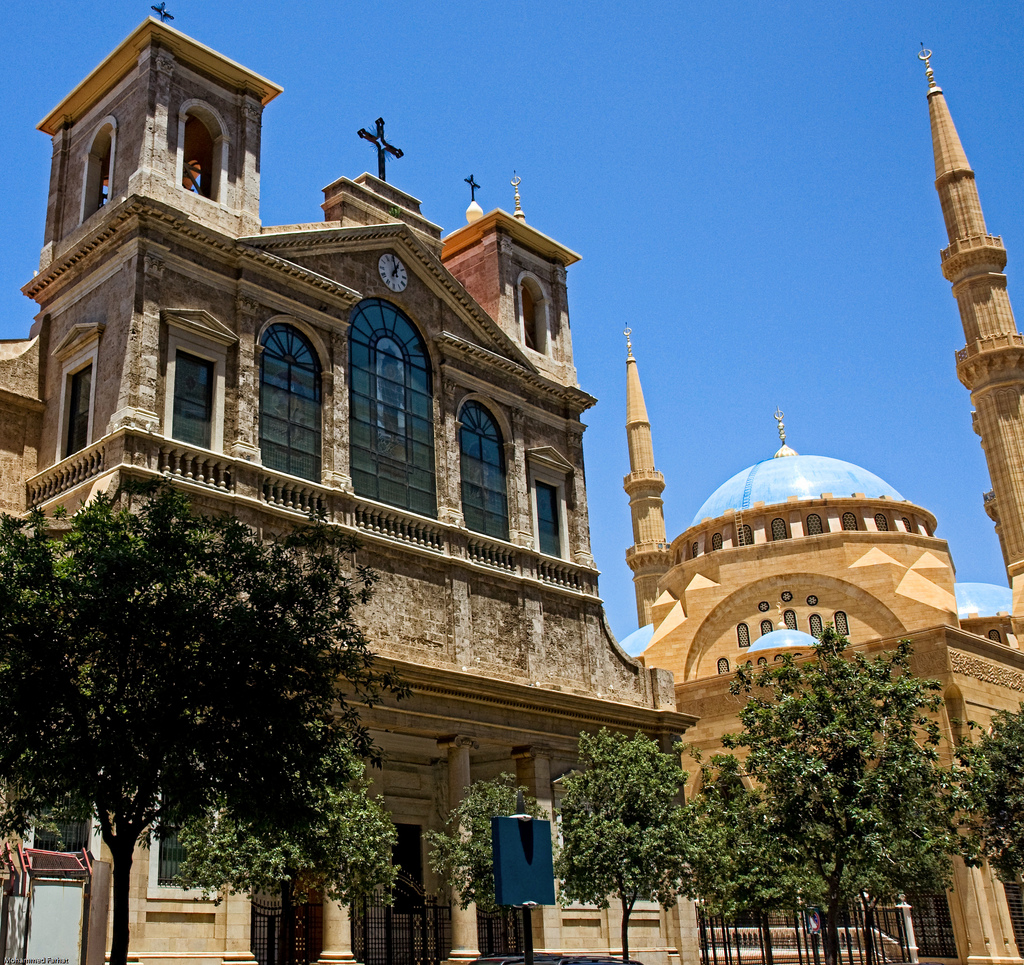

Location
- Country: Lebanon
- Ecclesiastical province: Immediately Subject to the Maronite Patriarch of Antioch
- Headquarters: Lebanon

Statistics
- Population: (as of 2012); 232,000
- Parishes: 127

Information
- Denomination: Catholic Church
- Sui iuris church: Maronite Church
- Rite: West Syro-Antiochene Rite
- Established: 1577
- Cathedral: Saint George Cathedral

Current leadership
- Pope: Leo XIV
- Patriarch: Bechara Boutros al-Rahi
- Archeparch: Paul Abdel Sater

Website
- http://www.maronitesbeirut.org/

The Archeparchy of Beirut (in Latin: Archeparchia Berytensis Maronitarum) is an archeparchial seat of the Maronite Church immediately subject to the Holy See in Lebanon. As of 2012, there were 232,000 baptized. It is currently ruled by Archeparch Paul Abdel Sater.

== Territory and statistics ==
The archeparchy includes the Beirut Governorate and the central part of the Mount Lebanon Governorate. Its archeparchial seat is the city of Beirut, where is located the Saint George Cathedral.

The territory is divided into 127 parishes and as of 2012, there were 232,000 Maronite Catholics.

== History ==
The presence of a sizeable Maronite community in Beirut dates back to the Crusades, as witnessed by William of Tyre. With the departure of the Crusaders, the community had an inevitably decrease. Its first bishop known is Youssef, mentioned in 1577 in the Annals of Patriarch Boutros Estephan El Douaihy. However the history of the Maronite bishops of Beirut for the past times is too flawed to be able to say with certainty that it was Youssef its first bishop.

After that Beirut had at least a century before finding the name of another bishop, Youssef Damascus (as-Sami, 1691). By now the number of Bishops is regular and uninterrupted until today. Among the successive bishops there was a special mention to Abdallah Qara'ali, founder of the OLM, renowned jurist, who played an important role in the Lebanese Council of 1736. This synod canonically established the Maronite episcopal sees, including even that of Beirut.

The residence of the bishops was not the city, but the monastery of Saint John of Qataleh. Only from Peter Karam Abu bishops began to reside permanently in Beirut. This favored the development of the Maronite community in a few years (1850 - 1870) from 3,000 to 15,000 faithful.

Tobia Aoun (1803-1871)

Bishop Tobia Aoun had trouble when he took possession of his seat facing opposition from a segment of the Maronite population, which supported a candidate who aspired to become bishop of Beirut, Nicolas Murad. Aoun eventually convinced him to abandon his project. Bishop Aoun finally took possession of the chair on June 10, 1847. Tobia Aoun travelled to Rome in 1862 and was personally received during a private audience by Pope Pius IX who named him Assistant to the Pontifical Throne. In becoming Assistant to the Pontifical Throne, Tobia Aoun immediately entered the Papal nobility as Count of Rome. In 1862, Bishop Aoun was received by Emperor Napoleon III in Paris and awarded the French Legion of Honour. That same year, he was received by Sultan Abdul-Aziz in Constantinople and awarded the Ottoman Empire's Order of Medjidjie (Nishan-i-Majidia). In 1869, Tobia Aoun returned to Rome as Council Father of the First Vatican Council called by Pope Pius IX. He started the construction of the archiepiscopal palace, which was completed by his successor Yusuf Dibs. Dibs rebuilt the Saint George Cathedral, in the forms we see today, and opened a minor seminary.

Bishop Pierre Chebly formed himself in France where he had spent most of his youth. During the First World War he was exiled by the Turks in Adana where he died.

The archeparchy is one of the most populous among archeparchies and eparchies of the Maronite Church. This archeparchy was visited three times by three Pontiffs: Pope Paul VI (1964), Pope John Paul II (1997) and Pope Benedict XVI (2012).

== Archeparchs ==
- Youssef (1577 -)
- Youssef Natan al-Blousani (1626-1650 deceased)
- Youssef as-Sami (27 January 1691 - 1698 resigned)
- Georges Khairallah Istifan (1698 - 1716 resigned)
- Abdallah Qara'ali (Aqraoli), OLM (September 17, 1716 - January 6, 1742 deceased)
- Youhanna Estephan (Istifan) (1743 - 1754 withdrawn)
- Joseph Estephan (August 1754 consecrated - April 6, 1767 confirmed Maronite Patriarch of Antioch)
- Athanasius Aelcheniei (1768 - 1778 deceased)
- Michael Fadel (1779 - September 10, 1793 elected Maronite Patriarch of Antioch)
  - Jeremiah Najim (November 11, 1779 - June 8, 1802 deceased)
- Michael Fadel II (June 27, 1796 confirmed - June 2, 1819 deceased)
- Peter Abu Karam (November 28, 1819 - January 15, 1844 deceased)
- Tobia Aoun (December 31, 1844 - April 4, 1871 deceased)
- Joseph Debs (February 11, 1872 - October 7, 1907 deceased)
- Pierre Chébly (Scebly) (February 14, 1908 - May 30, 1917 deceased)
- Ignace Mobarak (February 23, 1919 - January 20, 1952 withdrawn)
- Ignace Ziadé (January 26, 1952 - April 4, 1986 retired)
- Khalil Abi-Nader (April 4, 1986 - June 8, 1996 withdrawn)
- Paul Youssef Matar, (since June 8, 1996)

== Sources ==
- Annuario Pontificio, Libreria Editrice Vaticana, Città del Vaticano, 2003, ISBN 88-209-7422-3.
