= List of Catholic dioceses in Europe =

This is a list of the Catholic dioceses in Europe, i.e. dioceses of the Catholic Church. In Europe, there are a large number of dioceses principally centred in the countries of Italy, Spain, France, Ireland, and Poland. Italy has the largest number of dioceses per capita of any country, although Brazil has more in total.

An episcopal conference, or bishops' conference, is an official assembly of all the bishops in a defined geographic territory, usually a single country. Andorra and San Marino are part of neighboring foreign dioceses, and so are covered by the Spanish and Italian conferences, respectively. A single conference covers the five nordic countries, and dioceses in Gibraltar, Liechtenstein, Luxembourg, and Monaco are not part of any episcopal conference. In the British Isles, one conference covers the whole of Ireland, a second covers England and Wales (and the crown dependencies), and a third conference covers Scotland.

Dioceses are usually organized into ecclesiastical provinces headed by the archbishop seated in the designated metropolitan archdiocese. Bishops and dioceses subordinated to the metropolitan archbishop are called suffragans. However, not all archbishops are metropolitans. Sometimes an archdiocesan see is suffragan to a metropolitan archbishop, but retains its rank for historical reasons. Some dioceses and archdioceses are not suffragan to a metropolitan see, but are directly subject to the Holy See in Rome.

== List of Dioceses ==
This list is organized (when applicable) by episcopal conference and ecclesiastical province. Latin Church dioceses are listed in regular font. Eastern Catholic dioceses are listed in italics, only when suffragan to a Latin jurisdiction. Dioceses of sui iuris Eastern Catholic Churches are not listed.

Ecclesiastical province

- Metropolitan archdiocese
  - Suffragan dioceses (Latin Church)
  - Suffragan dioceses (Eastern Catholic)

=== Episcopal Conference of Albania ===
Ecclesiastical Province of Shkodër-Pult

- Archdiocese of Shkodër-Pult
  - Diocese of Lezhë
  - Diocese of Sapë

Ecclesiastical Province of Tiranë-Durrës

- Archdiocese of Tiranë-Durrës
  - Diocese of Rrëshen
  - Apostolic Administration of Southern Albania

=== Episcopal Conference of Austria ===
Ecclesiastical Province of Salzburg

- Archdiocese of Salzburg
  - Diocese of Feldkirch
  - Diocese of Graz-Seckau
  - Diocese of Gurk
  - Diocese of Innsbruck

Ecclesiastical Province of Wien

- Archdiocese of Wien
  - Diocese of Eisenstadt
  - Diocese of Linz
  - Diocese of Sankt Pölten

Immediately subject to the Holy See

- Military Ordinariate of Austria
- Territorial Abbey of Wettingen-Mehrerau

=== Episcopal Conference of Belarus ===
Ecclesiastical Province of Minsk-Mohilev

- Archdiocese of Minsk-Mohilev
  - Diocese of Hrodna
  - Diocese of Pinsk
  - Diocese of Vitebsk

=== Episcopal Conference of Belgium ===
Ecclesiastical Province of Mechelen-Brussels

- Archdiocese of Mechelen-Brussels
  - Diocese of Antwerp
  - Diocese of Bruges
  - Diocese of Ghent
  - Diocese of Hasselt
  - Diocese of Liège
  - Diocese of Namur
  - Diocese of Tournai

=== Episcopal Conference of Bosnia ===
Ecclesiastical Province of Sarajevo

- Archdiocese of Vrhbosna
  - Diocese of Banja Luka
  - Diocese of Mostar Duvno
  - Diocese of Skopje

=== Episcopal Conference of Bulgaria ===
Immediately subject to the Holy See

- Diocese of Nicopoli
- Diocese of Sofia and Plovdiv
- Apostolic Exarchate of Sophia

=== Episcopal Conference of Croatia ===
Ecclesiastical Province of Rijeka

- Archdiocese of Rijeka
  - Diocese of Gospić–Senj
  - Diocese of Krk
  - Diocese of Poreč i Pula

Ecclesiastical Province of Sirmio

- Archdiocese of Đakovo-Osijek
  - Diocese of Požega
  - Diocese of Srijem (in Serbia)

Ecclesiastical Province of Split-Makarska

- Archdiocese of Split-Makarska
  - Diocese of Dubrovnik
  - Diocese of Hvar-Brač-Vis
  - Diocese of Kotor (in Montenegro)
  - Diocese of Šibenik

Ecclesiastical Province of Zagreb

- Archdiocese of Zagreb
  - Eparchy of Križevci
  - Diocese of Varaždin
  - Diocese of Bjelovar-Križevci
  - Diocese of Sisak

=== Episcopal Conference of the Czech Republic ===
Ecclesiastical province of Bohemia

- Archdiocese of Prague
  - Diocese of České Budějovice
  - Diocese of Hradec Králové
  - Diocese of Litoměřice
  - Diocese of Plzeň

Ecclesiastical province of Moravia (Archbishopric of Moravia)

- Archdiocese of Olomouc
  - Diocese of Brno
  - Diocese of Ostrava-Opava

=== Episcopal Conference of England and Wales ===
Ecclesiastical province of Birmingham

- Archdiocese of Birmingham
  - Diocese of Clifton
  - Diocese of Shrewsbury

Ecclesiastical province of Cardiff

- Archdiocese of Cardiff-Menevia
  - Diocese of Wrexham

Ecclesiastical province of Liverpool

- Archdiocese of Liverpool
  - Diocese of Hallam
  - Diocese of Hexham and Newcastle
  - Diocese of Lancaster
  - Diocese of Leeds
  - Diocese of Middlesbrough
  - Diocese of Salford

Ecclesiastical province of Southwark

- Archdiocese of Southwark
  - Diocese of Arundel and Brighton
  - Diocese of Plymouth
  - Diocese of Portsmouth

Ecclesiastical province of Westminster

- Archdiocese of Westminster
  - Diocese of Brentwood
  - Diocese of East Anglia
  - Diocese of Northampton
  - Diocese of Nottingham

=== Episcopal Conference of France ===
Ecclesiastical Province of Besançon

- Metropolitan Archdiocese of Besançon
  - Diocese of Belfort-Montbéliard
  - Diocese of Nancy
  - Diocese of Saint-Claude
  - Diocese of Saint-Dié
  - Diocese of Verdun

Ecclesiastical Province of Bordeaux

- Metropolitan Archdiocese of Bordeaux
  - Diocese of Agen
  - Diocese of Aire
  - Diocese of Bayonne
  - Diocese of Périgueux

Ecclesiastical Province of Clermont

- Metropolitan Archdiocese of Clermont
  - Diocese of Le Puy-en-Velay
  - Diocese of Moulins
  - Diocese of Saint-Flour

Ecclesiastical Province of Dijon

- Metropolitan Archdiocese of Dijon
  - Archdiocese of Sens
  - Diocese of Autun
  - Diocese of Nevers
  - Territorial prelature of the Mission de France at Pontigny

Ecclesiastical Province of Lille

- Metropolitan Archdiocese of Lille
  - Archdiocese of Cambrai
  - Diocese of Arras

Ecclesiastical Province of Lyon

- Metropolitan Archdiocese of Lyon
  - Archdiocese of Chambéry
  - Diocese of Annecy
  - Diocese of Belley-Ars
  - Diocese of Grenoble-Vienne
  - Diocese of Saint-Étienne
  - Diocese of Valence = Drôme
  - Diocese of Viviers = Ardèche

Ecclesiastical Province of Marseille

- Metropolitan Archdiocese of Marseille
  - Archdiocese of Aix
  - Archdiocese of Avignon
  - Diocese of Ajaccio
  - Diocese of Digne
  - Diocese of Fréjus-Toulon
  - Diocese of Gap
  - Diocese of Nice

Ecclesiastical Province of Montpellier

- Metropolitan Archdiocese of Montpellier
  - Diocese of Carcassonne
  - Diocese of Mende
  - Diocese of Nîmes
  - Diocese of Perpignan-Elne

Ecclesiastical Province of Paris

- Metropolitan Archdiocese of Paris
  - Diocese of Créteil
  - Diocese of Évry–Corbeil-Essonnes
  - Diocese of Meaux
  - Diocese of Nanterre
  - Diocese of Pontoise
  - Diocese of Saint-Denis
  - Diocese of Versailles

Ecclesiastical Province of Poitiers

- Metropolitan Archdiocese of Poitiers
  - Diocese of Angoulême
  - Diocese of La Rochelle
  - Diocese of Limoges
  - Diocese of Tulle

Ecclesiastical Province of Reims

- Archdiocese of Reims
  - Diocese of Amiens
  - Diocese of Beauvais
  - Diocese of Châlons
  - Diocese of Langres
  - Diocese of Soissons
  - Diocese of Troyes

Ecclesiastical Province of Rennes

- Metropolitan Archdiocese of Rennes
  - Diocese of Angers
  - Diocese of Laval
  - Diocese of Le Mans
  - Diocese of Luçon
  - Diocese of Nantes
  - Diocese of Quimper
  - Diocese of Saint-Brieuc
  - Diocese of Vannes

Ecclesiastical Province of Rouen

- Metropolitan Archdiocese of Rouen
  - Diocese of Bayeux
  - Diocese of Coutances
  - Diocese of Évreux
  - Diocese of Le Havre
  - Diocese of Sées

Ecclesiastical Province of Toulouse

- Metropolitan Archdiocese of Toulouse
  - Archdiocese of Albi
  - Archdiocese of Auch
  - Diocese of Cahors
  - Diocese of Montauban
  - Diocese of Pamiers
  - Diocese of Rodez
  - Diocese of Tarbes-et-Lourdes

Ecclesiastical Province of Tours

- Metropolitan Archdiocese of Tours
  - Archdiocese of Bourges
  - Diocese of Blois
  - Diocese of Chartres
  - Diocese of Orléans

Immediately subject to the Holy See

- Diocese of Metz
- Archdiocese of Strasbourg

=== Episcopal Conference of Germany ===
Ecclesiastical province of Bamburg

- Archdiocese of Bamberg
  - Diocese of Eichstätt
  - Diocese of Speyer
  - Diocese of Würzburg

Ecclesiastical province of Berlin

- Archdiocese of Berlin
  - Diocese of Dresden-Meissen
  - Diocese of Görlitz

Ecclesiastical province of Hamburg

- Archdiocese of Hamburg
  - Diocese of Hildesheim
  - Diocese of Osnabrück

Middle German ecclesiastical province

(a.k.a. Ecclesiastical province of Paderborn)

- Archdiocese of Paderborn
  - Diocese of Erfurt
  - Diocese of Fulda
  - Diocese of Magdeburg

Ecclesiastical province of Munich and Freising

- Archdiocese of Munich and Freising
  - Diocese of Augsburg
  - Diocese of Passau
  - Diocese of Regensburg

Rhenish ecclesiastical province

(a.k.a. Ecclesiastical province of Cologne)

- Archdiocese of Cologne
  - Diocese of Aachen
  - Diocese of Essen
  - Diocese of Limburg
  - Diocese of Münster
  - Diocese of Trier

Upper Rhenish ecclesiastical province

(a.k.a. Ecclesiastical province of Freiburg im Breisgau)

- Archdiocese of Freiburg
  - Diocese of Mainz
  - Diocese of Rottenburg-Stuttgart

=== Episcopal Conference of Greece ===
Ecclesiastical Province of Corfù, Zante e Cefalonia

- Archdiocese of Corfù, Zante e Cefalonia

Ecclesiastical Province of Naxos, Andros, Tinos e Mykonos

- Archdiocese of Naxos, Andros, Tinos and Mykonos
  - Diocese of Chios
  - Diocese of Crete
  - Diocese of Santorini
  - Diocese of Syros e Milos

=== Episcopal Conference of Hungary ===
Ecclesiastical Province of Eger

- Archdiocese of Eger
  - Diocese of Debrecen–Nyíregyháza
  - Diocese of Vác

Ecclesiastical Province of Esztergom-Budapest

- Archdiocese of Esztergom-Budapest
  - Diocese of Győr
  - Diocese of Hajdúdorog
  - Diocese of Székesfehérvár

Ecclesiastical Province of Kalocsa-Kecskemét

- Archdiocese of Kalocsa-Kecskemét
  - Diocese of Pécs
  - Diocese of Szeged–Csanád

Ecclesiastical Province of Veszprém

- Archdiocese of Veszprém
  - Diocese of Kaposvár
  - Diocese of Szombathely

=== Episcopal Conference of Ireland ===
Ecclesiastical province of Armagh

- Archdiocese of Armagh
  - Diocese of Ardagh and Clonmacnoise
  - Diocese of Clogher
  - Diocese of Derry
  - Diocese of Down and Connor
  - Diocese of Dromore
  - Diocese of Kilmore
  - Diocese of Meath
  - Diocese of Raphoe

Ecclesiastical province of Cashel

- Archdiocese of Cashel
  - Diocese of Cloyne
  - Diocese of Cork and Ross
  - Diocese of Kerry
  - Diocese of Killaloe
  - Diocese of Limerick
  - Diocese of Waterford and Lismore

Ecclesiastical province of Dublin

- Archdiocese of Dublin
  - Diocese of Ferns
  - Diocese of Kildare and Leighlin
  - Diocese of Ossory

Ecclesiastical province of Tuam

- Archdiocese of Tuam
  - Diocese of Achonry
  - Diocese of Clonfert
  - Diocese of Elphin
  - Diocese of Galway and Kilmacduagh and Kilfenora
  - Diocese of Killala

=== Episcopal Conference of Italy ===
Ecclesiastical Province of Agrigento

- Archdiocese of Agrigento
  - Diocese of Caltanissetta
  - Diocese of Piazza Armerina

Ecclesiastical Province of Ancona-Osimo

- Archdiocese of Ancona-Osimo
  - Diocese of Fabriano-Matelica
  - Diocese of Jesi
  - Diocese of Senigallia
  - Territorial Prelature of Loreto

Ecclesiastical Province of Bari-Bitonto

- Archdiocese of Bari-Bitonto
  - Archdiocese of Trani-Barletta-Bisceglie
  - Diocese of Altamura-Gravina-Acquaviva delle Fonti
  - Diocese of Andria
  - Diocese of Conversano-Monopoli
  - Diocese of Molfetta-Ruvo-Giovinazzo-Terlizzi

Ecclesiastical Province of Benevento

- Archdiocese of Benevento
  - Archdiocese of Sant'Angelo dei Lombardi-Conza-Nusco-Bisaccia
  - Diocese of Ariano Irpino-Lacedonia
  - Diocese of Avellino
  - Diocese of Cerreto Sannita-Telese-Sant’Agata de’ Goti
  - Territorial Abbey of Montevergine

Ecclesiastical Province of Bologna

- Archdiocese of Bologna
  - Archdiocese of Ferrara-Comacchio
  - Diocese of Faenza-Modigliana
  - Diocese of Imola

Ecclesiastical Province of Campobasso-Boiano

- Archdiocese of Campobasso-Boiano
  - Diocese of Isernia-Venafro
  - Diocese of Termoli-Larino
  - Diocese of Trivento

Ecclesiastical Province of Cagliari

- Archdiocese of Cagliari
  - Diocese of Iglesias
  - Diocese of Lanusei
  - Diocese of Nuoro

Ecclesiastical Province of Catanzaro-Squillace

- Archdiocese of Catanzaro-Squillace
  - Archdiocese of Crotone-Santa Severina
  - Diocese of Lamezia Terme

Ecclesiastical Province of Catania

- Archdiocese of Catania
  - Diocese of Acireale
  - Diocese of Caltagirone

Ecclesiastical Province of Chieti-Vasto

- Archdiocese of Chieti-Vasto
  - Archdiocese of Lanciano-Ortona

Ecclesiastical Province of Cosenza-Bisignano

- Archdiocese of Cosenza-Bisignano
  - Archdiocese of Rossano-Cariati
  - Diocese of Cassano all'Jonio
  - Diocese of San Marco Argentano-Scalea

Ecclesiastical Province of Fermo

- Archdiocese of Fermo
  - Archdiocese of Camerino-San Severino Marche
  - Diocese of Ascoli Piceno
  - Diocese of Macerata-Tolentino-Recanati-Cingoli-Treia
  - Diocese of San Benedetto del Tronto-Ripatransone-Montalto

Ecclesiastical Province of Florence

- Archdiocese of Florence
  - Diocese of Arezzo-Cortona-Sansepolcro
  - Diocese of Fiesole
  - Diocese of Pistoia
  - Diocese of Prato
  - Diocese of San Miniato

Ecclesiastical Province of Foggia-Bovino

- Archdiocese of Foggia-Bovino
  - Archdiocese of Manfredonia-Vieste-S. Giovanni Rotondo
  - Diocese of Cerignola-Ascoli Satriano
  - Diocese of Lucera-Troia
  - Diocese of San Severo

Ecclesiastical Province of Genoa

- Archdiocese of Genoa
  - Diocese of Albenga-Imperia
  - Diocese of Chiavari
  - Diocese of La Spezia-Sarzana-Brugnato
  - Diocese of Savona-Noli
  - Diocese of Tortona
  - Diocese of Ventimiglia-San Remo

Ecclesiastical Province of Gorizia

- Archdiocese of Gorizia
  - Diocese of Trieste

Ecclesiastical Province of L'Aquila

- Archdiocese of L'Aquila
  - Diocese of Avezzano
  - Diocese of Sulmona-Valva

Ecclesiastical Province of Lecce

- Archdiocese of Lecce
  - Archdiocese of Brindisi-Ostuni
  - Archdiocese of Otranto
  - Diocese of Nardò-Gallipoli
  - Diocese of Ugento-Santa Maria di Leuca

Ecclesiastical Province of Messina-Lipari-Santa Lucia del Mela

- Archdiocese of Messina-Lipari-Santa Lucia del Mela
  - Diocese of Nicosia
  - Diocese of Patti

Ecclesiastical Province of Milan

- Archdiocese of Milan
  - Diocese of Bergamo
  - Diocese of Brescia
  - Diocese of Como
  - Diocese of Crema
  - Diocese of Cremona
  - Diocese of Lodi
  - Diocese of Mantua
  - Diocese of Pavia
  - Diocese of Vigevano

Ecclesiastical Province of Modena-Nonantola

- Archdiocese of Modena-Nonantola
  - Diocese of Carpi
  - Diocese of Fidenza
  - Diocese of Parma
  - Diocese of Piacenza-Bobbio
  - Diocese of Reggio Emilia-Guastalla

Ecclesiastical Province of Naples

- Archdiocese of Naples
  - Archdiocese of Capua
  - Archdiocese of Sorrento-Castellammare di Stabia
  - Diocese of Acerra
  - Diocese of Alife-Caiazzo
  - Diocese of Aversa
  - Diocese of Caserta
  - Diocese of Ischia
  - Diocese of Nola
  - Diocese of Pozzuoli
  - Diocese of Sessa Aurunca
  - Diocese of Teano-Calvi
  - Territorial Prelature of Pompei o Beatissima Vergine Maria del SS.mo Rosario

Ecclesiastical Province of Oristano

- Archdiocese of Oristano
  - Diocese of Ales-Terralba

Ecclesiastical Province of Palermo

- Archdiocese of Palermo
  - Archdiocese of Monreale
  - Diocese of Cefalu
  - Diocese of Mazara del Vallo
  - Diocese of Trapani

Ecclesiastical Province of Perugia-Città della Pieve

- Archdiocese of Perugia-Città della Pieve
  - Diocese of Assisi-Nocera Umbra-Gualdo Tadino
  - Diocese of Città di Castello
  - Diocese of Foligno
  - Diocese of Gubbio

Ecclesiastical Province of Pesaro

- Archdiocese of Pesaro
  - Archdiocese of Urbino-Urbania-Sant'Angelo in Vado
  - Diocese of Fano-Fossombrone-Cagli-Pergola

Ecclesiastical Province of Pescara-Penne

- Archdiocese of Pescara-Penne
  - Diocese of Teramo-Atri

Ecclesiastical Province of Pisa

- Archdiocese of Pisa
  - Diocese of Livorno
  - Diocese of Massa Carrara-Pontremoli
  - Diocese of Pescia
  - Diocese of Volterra

Ecclesiastical Province of Potenza-Muro Lucano-Marsico Nuovo

- Archdiocese of Potenza-Muro Lucano-Marsico Nuovo
  - Archdiocese of Acerenza
  - Archdiocese of Matera-Irsina
  - Diocese of Melfi-Rapolla-Venosa
  - Diocese of Tricarico
  - Diocese of Tursi-Lagonegro

Ecclesiastical Province of Ravenna-Cervia

- Archdiocese of Ravenna-Cervia
  - Diocese of Cesena-Sarsina
  - Diocese of Forli-Bertinoro
  - Diocese of Rimini
  - Diocese of San Marino-Montefeltro

Ecclesiastical Province of Reggio Calabria-Bova

- Archdiocese of Reggio Calabria-Bova
  - Diocese of Locri-Gerace
  - Diocese of Mileto-Nicotera-Tropea
  - Diocese of Oppido Mamertina-Palmi

Ecclesiastical Province of Rome

- Diocese of Rome
  - Suburbicarian See of Albano
  - Suburbicarian See of Frascati
  - Suburbicarian See of Palestrina
  - Suburbicarian See of Porto-Santa Rufina
  - Suburbicarian See of Sabina-Poggio Mirteto
  - Suburbicarian See of Velletri-Segni
  - Archdiocese of Gaeta
  - Diocese of Anagni-Alatri
  - Diocese of Civita Castellana
  - Diocese of Civitavecchia-Tarquinia
  - Diocese of Frosinone-Veroli-Ferentino
  - Diocese of Latina-Terracina-Sezze-Priverno
  - Diocese of Rieti
  - Diocese of Sora-Aquino-Pontecorvo
  - Diocese of Tivoli
  - Diocese of Viterbo
  - Territorial Abbey of Montecassino
  - Territorial Abbey of San Paolo fuori le Mura
  - Territorial Abbey of Subiaco

Ecclesiastical Province of Sassari

- Archdiocese of Sassari
  - Diocese of Alghero-Bosa
  - Diocese of Ozieri
  - Diocese of Tempio-Ampurias

Ecclesiastical Province of Salerno-Campagna-Acerno

- Archdiocese of Salerno-Campagna-Acerno
  - Archdiocese of Amalfi-Cava de' Tirreni
  - Diocese of Nocera Inferiore-Sarno
  - Diocese of Teggiano-Policastro
  - Diocese of Vallo della Lucania
  - Territorial Abbey of Santissima Trinità di Cava de' Tirreni

Ecclesiastical Province of Siena-Colle di Val d'Elsa-Montalcino

- Archdiocese of Siena-Colle di Val d'Elsa-Montalcino
  - Diocese of Grosseto
  - Diocese of Massa Marittima-Piombino
  - Diocese of Montepulciano-Chiusi-Pienza
  - Diocese of Pitigliano-Sovana-Orbetello

Ecclesiastical Province of Siracusa

- Archdiocese of Siracusa
  - Diocese of Noto
  - Diocese of Ragusa

Ecclesiastical Province of Taranto

- Archdiocese of Taranto
  - Diocese of Castellaneta
  - Diocese of Oria

Ecclesiastical Province of Turin

- Archdiocese of Turin
  - Diocese of Acqui
  - Diocese of Alba Pompeia
  - Diocese of Aosta
  - Diocese of Asti
  - Diocese of Cuneo
  - Diocese of Fossano
  - Diocese of Ivrea
  - Diocese of Mondovi
  - Diocese of Pinerolo
  - Diocese of Saluzzo
  - Diocese of Susa

Ecclesiastical Province of Trento

- Archdiocese of Trento
  - Diocese of Bolzano-Brixen

Ecclesiastical Province of Udine

- Archdiocese of Udine

Ecclesiastical Province of Venice

- Archdiocese of Venice
  - Diocese of Adria-Rovigo
  - Diocese of Belluno-Feltre
  - Diocese of Chioggia
  - Diocese of Concordia-Pordenone
  - Diocese of Padua
  - Diocese of Treviso
  - Diocese of Verona
  - Diocese of Vicenza
  - Diocese of Vittorio Veneto

Ecclesiastical Province of Vercelli

- Archdiocese of Vercelli
  - Diocese of Alessandria della Paglia
  - Diocese of Biella
  - Diocese of Casale Monferrato
  - Diocese of Novara

=== Episcopal Conference of Malta ===
Ecclesiastical Province of Malta

- Archdiocese of Malta
  - Diocese of Gozo

=== Episcopal Conference of the Netherlands ===
Ecclesiastical Province of Utrecht

- Archdiocese of Utrecht
  - Diocese of Breda
  - Diocese of Groningen-Leeuwarden
  - Diocese of Haarlem-Amsterdam
  - Diocese of Roermond
  - Diocese of Rotterdam
  - Diocese of 's-Hertogenbosch

=== Episcopal Conference of Poland ===
Ecclesiastical province of Białystok

- Archdiocese of Białystok
  - Diocese of Drohiczyn.
  - Diocese of Łomża.

Ecclesiastical province of Częstochowa

- Archdiocese of Częstochowa.
  - Diocese of Radom.
  - Diocese of Sosnowiec.

Ecclesiastical province of Gdańsk

- Archdiocese of Gdańsk.
  - Diocese of Pelplin.
  - Diocese of Toruń.

Ecclesiastical province of Gniezno

- Archdiocese of Gniezno.
  - Diocese of Bydgoszcz.
  - Diocese of Włocławek.

Ecclesiastical province of Katowice

- Archdiocese of Katowice.
  - Diocese of Gliwice.
  - Diocese of Opole.

Ecclesiastical province of Kraków

- Archdiocese of Kraków.
  - Diocese of Bielsko-Żywiec.
  - Diocese of Kielce.
  - Diocese of Tarnów.

Ecclesiastical province of Łódź

- Archdiocese of Łódź.
  - Diocese of Łowicz.

Ecclesiastical province of Lublin

- Archdiocese of Lublin.
  - Diocese of Sandomierz.
  - Diocese of Siedlce.

Ecclesiastical province of Poznań

- Archdiocese of Poznań.
  - Diocese of Kalisz.

Ecclesiastical province of Przemyśl

- Archdiocese of Przemyśl
  - Diocese of Rzeszów.
  - Diocese of Zamość-Lubaczów.

Ecclesiastical province of Szczecin-Kamień

- Archdiocese of Szczecin-Kamień.
  - Diocese of Koszalin-Kołobrzeg.
  - Diocese of Zielona Góra-Gorzów.

Ecclesiastical province of Warmia

- Archdiocese of Warmia.
  - Diocese of Elbląg.
  - Diocese of Ełk.

Ecclesiastical province of Warszawa

- Archdiocese of Warszawa.
  - Diocese of Płock.
  - Diocese of Warszawa-Praga.

Ecclesiastical province of Wrocław

- Archdiocese of Wrocław
  - Diocese of Legnica
  - Diocese of Świdnica

Metropolis of Przemyśl–Warsaw (Ukrainian Greek Catholic Church)

- Archeparchy of Przemyśl–Warsaw
  - Eparchy of Wrocław-Koszalin
  - Eparchy of Olsztyn–Gdańsk

=== Episcopal Conference of Portugal ===
Ecclesiastical Province of Lisboa

- Archdiocese of Lisboa
  - Diocese of Angra
  - Diocese of Funchal
  - Diocese of Guarda
  - Diocese of Leiria-Fátima
  - Diocese of Portalegre-Castelo Branco
  - Diocese of Santarém
  - Diocese of Setúbal

Ecclesiastical Province of Braga

- Archdiocese of Braga
  - Diocese of Aveiro
  - Diocese of Bragança-Miranda
  - Diocese of Coimbra
  - Diocese of Lamego
  - Diocese of Porto
  - Diocese of Viana do Castelo
  - Diocese of Vila Real
  - Diocese of Viseu

Ecclesiastical Province of Évora

- Archdiocese of Évora
  - Diocese of Beja
  - Diocese of Faro

=== Episcopal Conference of Romania ===
The Latin rite Ecclesiastical Province of Bucharest

- Archdiocese of Bucharest
  - Diocese of Iaşi
  - Diocese of Oradea Mare
  - Diocese of Satu Mare
  - Diocese of Timișoara

=== Episcopal Conference of Scandinavia ===
Immediately subject to the Holy See

- Diocese of Copenhagen
- Diocese of Helsinki
- Diocese of Reykjavík
- Diocese of Oslo
- Diocese of Stockholm

=== Episcopal Conference of Scotland ===
Ecclesiastical province of Glasgow

- Archdiocese of Glasgow
  - Diocese of Motherwell
  - Diocese of Paisley

Ecclesiastical province of Saint Andrews and Edinburgh

- Archdiocese of Saint Andrews and Edinburgh
  - Diocese of Aberdeen
  - Diocese of Argyll and the Isles
  - Diocese of Dunkeld
  - Diocese of Galloway

=== Episcopal Conference of Serbia ===
Ecclesiastical Province of Beograd

- Archdiocese of Beograd
  - Diocese of Subotica
  - Diocese of Zrenjanin

=== Episcopal Conference of Slovakia ===
Ecclesiastical Province of Bratislava

- Archdiocese of Bratislava
  - Archdiocese of Trnava
  - Diocese of Banská Bystrica
  - Diocese of Nitra
  - Diocese of Žilina

Ecclesiastical Province of Košice

- Archdiocese of Košice
  - Diocese of Rožňava
  - Diocese of Spiš

=== Episcopal Conference of Slovenia ===
Ecclesiastical Province of Ljubljana

- Archdiocese of Ljubljana
  - Diocese of Koper
  - Diocese of Novo Mesto

Ecclesiastical Province of Maribor

- Archdiocese of Maribor
  - Diocese of Celje
  - Diocese of Murska Sobota

=== Episcopal Conference of Spain ===
Ecclesiastical province of Barcelona

- Archdiocese of Barcelona
  - Diocese of Sant Feliu de Llobregat.
  - Diocese of Terrassa.

Ecclesiastical province of Burgos

- Archdiocese of Burgos.
  - Diocese of Bilbao.
  - Diocese of Osma-Soria.
  - Diocese of Palencia.
  - Diocese of Vitoria.

Ecclesiastical province of Granada

- Archdiocese of Granada
  - Diocese of Almería
  - Diocese of Cartagena
  - Diocese of Guadix
  - Diocese of Jaén
  - Diocese of Málaga

Ecclesiastical province of Madrid

- Archdiocese of Madrid.
  - Diocese of Alcalá de Henares.
  - Diocese of Getafe.

Ecclesiastical province of Mérida-Badajoz

- Archdiocese of Mérida-Badajoz.
  - Diocese of Coria-Cáceres.
  - Diocese of Plasencia.

Ecclesiastical province of Oviedo

- Archdiocese of Oviedo.
  - Diocese of Astorga.
  - Diocese of León.
  - Diocese of Santander.

Ecclesiastical province of Pamplona

- Archdiocese of Pamplona y Tudela.
  - Diocese of Calahorra and La Calzada-Logroño.
  - Diocese of Jaca
  - Diocese of San Sebastián

Ecclesiastical province of Santiago de Compostela

- Archdiocese of Santiago de Compostela.
  - Diocese of Lugo.
  - Diocese of Mondoñedo-Ferrol.
  - Diocese of Ourense.
  - Diocese of Tui-Vigo.

Ecclesiastical province of Seville

- Archdiocese of Seville.
  - Diocese of Cádiz and Ceuta.
  - Diocese of the Canaries.
  - Diocese of Córdoba.
  - Diocese of Huelva.
  - Diocese of Jerez de la Frontera.
  - Diocese of San Cristóbal de La Laguna.

Ecclesiastical province of Tarragona

- Archdiocese of Tarragona
  - Diocese of Girona.
  - Diocese of Lleida.
  - Diocese of Solsona.
  - Diocese of Tortosa.
  - Diocese of Urgell.
  - Diocese of Vic.

Ecclesiastical province of Toledo

- Archdiocese of Toledo.
  - Diocese of Albacete.
  - Diocese of Ciudad Real.
  - Diocese of Cuenca.
  - Diocese of Sigüenza-Guadalajara.

Ecclesiastical province of Valencia

- Archdiocese of Valencia.
  - Diocese of Ibiza.
  - Diocese of Mallorca.
  - Diocese of Menorca.
  - Diocese of Orihuela-Alicante.
  - Diocese of Segorbe-Castellón.

Ecclesiastical province of Valladolid

- Archdiocese of Valladolid
  - Diocese of Ávila
  - Diocese of Ciudad Rodrigo
  - Diocese of Salamanca
  - Diocese of Segovia
  - Diocese of Zamora.

Ecclesiastical province of Zaragoza

- Archdiocese of Zaragoza
  - Diocese of Barbastro-Monzón
  - Diocese of Huesca
  - Diocese of Tarazona
  - Diocese of Teruel and Albarracín

=== Swiss Bishop's Conference ===
Immediately subject to the Holy See

- Diocese of Basel
- Diocese of Chur
- Diocese of Lausanne, Geneva and Fribourg
- Diocese of Lugano
- Diocese of Sankt Gallen
- Diocese of Sion

=== Episcopal Conference of Ukraine ===
Ecclesiastical province of Lviv

- Archdiocese of Lviv
  - Diocese of Kyiv-Zhytomyr
  - Diocese of Kamyanets-Podilskyi
  - Diocese of Lutsk
  - Diocese of Mukacheve
  - Diocese of Kharkiv-Zaporizhzhia
  - Diocese of Odesa-Simferopol

Major Archeparchy of Kyiv–Galicia (Ukrainian Greek Catholic Church)

- Archeparchy of Kyiv
  - Archiepiscopal Exarchate of Donetsk
  - Archiepiscopal Exarchate of Odesa
  - Archiepiscopal Exarchate of Lutsk
  - Archiepiscopal Exarchate of Crimea
  - Archiepiscopal Exarchate of Kharkiv

Metropolis of Lviv (Ukrainian Greek Catholic Church)

- Archeparchy of Lviv
  - Eparchy of Sambir–Drohobych
  - Eparchy of Zboriv
  - Eparchy of Stryi
  - Eparchy of Sokal–Zhovkva

Metropolis of Ternopil – Zboriv (Ukrainian Greek Catholic Church)

- Archeparchy of Ternopil–Zboriv
  - Eparchy of Buchach
  - Eparchy of Kamyanets-Podilskyi

Metropolis of Ivano-Frankivsk (Ukrainian Greek Catholic Church)

- Archeparchy of Ivano-Frankivsk
  - Eparchy of Kolomyia
  - Eparchy of Chernivtsi

== Immediately Subject to the Holy See ==
=== Under the direct authority of the Holy See ===
Croatia

- Archdiocese of Zadar

Estonia

- Diocese of Tallinn

Gibraltar

- Diocese of Gibraltar

Greece

- Archdiocese of Athenai
- Archdiocese of Rhodos
- Apostolic Vicariate of Thessaloniki

Italy

- Archdiocese of Lucca
- Archdiocese of Spoleto
- Diocese of Terni-Narni-Amelia
- Diocese of Orvieto-Todi

Kosovo

- Diocese of Prizren-Pristina

Liechtenstein

- Archdiocese of Vaduz

Luxembourg

- Archdiocese of Luxembourg

Monaco

- Archdiocese of Monaco

Montenegro

- Archdiocese of Bar

Romania

- Archdiocese of Alba Iulia

Serbia

- Eparchy of Ruski Krstur

== See also ==
- Catholic Church by country
- Catholic Church in Africa
- Catholic Church in Asia
- Catholic Church in North America
- Catholic Church in Latin America
- Catholic Church in Oceania
- List of Dioceses in Europe:
  - List of Catholic dioceses in Nordic Europe
  - List of Catholic dioceses in the Balkans
- Roman Catholicism in Australia
