= List of eparchies of the Ukrainian Greek Catholic Church =

The following is a list of eparchies of the Ukrainian Greek Catholic Church.

== Ukraine ==
- Ukrainian Catholic Eparchy of Chernivtsi
- Ukrainian Catholic Eparchy of Kamyanets-Podilskyi
- Ukrainian Catholic Eparchy of Kolomyia
- Ukrainian Catholic Eparchy of Sambir–Drohobych
- Ukrainian Catholic Eparchy of Sokal–Zhovkva
- Ukrainian Catholic Eparchy of Stryi
- Ukrainian Catholic Archeparchy of Ivano-Frankivsk
- Ukrainian Catholic Archeparchy of Kyiv
- Ukrainian Catholic Archeparchy of Lviv
- Ukrainian Catholic Archeparchy of Ternopil–Zboriv
- Ukrainian Catholic Major Archeparchy of Kyiv–Galicia
- Eparchy of Buchach
- Ukrainian Catholic Eparchy of Volodymyr–Brest (historical)
- Ukrainian Catholic Eparchy of Zboriv (historical)

== Poland ==
- Ukrainian Catholic Eparchy of Olsztyn–Gdańsk
- Ukrainian Catholic Eparchy of Wrocław–Koszalin
- Ukrainian Catholic Archeparchy of Przemyśl–Warsaw
- Apostolic Exarchate of Łemkowszczyzna (historical)

== United States ==
- Ukrainian Catholic Eparchy of Chicago
- Ukrainian Catholic Eparchy of Stamford
- Ukrainian Catholic Eparchy of Saint Josaphat in Parma
- Ukrainian Catholic Archeparchy of Philadelphia

== Brazil ==
- Ukrainian Catholic Eparchy of Imaculada Conceição in Prudentópolis
- Ukrainian Catholic Archeparchy of São João Batista em Curitiba

== Canada ==
- Ukrainian Catholic Eparchy of Edmonton
- Ukrainian Catholic Eparchy of New Westminster
- Ukrainian Catholic Eparchy of Saskatoon
- Ukrainian Catholic Eparchy of Toronto and Eastern Canada
- Ukrainian Catholic Archeparchy of Winnipeg

== United Kingdom ==
- Ukrainian Catholic Eparchy of the Holy Family of London

== France ==
- Ukrainian Catholic Eparchy of Saint Vladimir the Great of Paris; with territory encompassing France, Belgium, Luxemburg, the Netherlands and Switzerland

== Australia ==
- Ukrainian Catholic Eparchy of Saints Peter and Paul of Melbourne

== Argentina ==
- Ukrainian Catholic Eparchy of Santa María del Patrocinio in Buenos Aires

== Lithuania ==
- Ukrainian Catholic Eparchy of Vilnius (historical)
