= Wasyl Medwit =

Ukrainian Greek Catholic bishop (1949–2024)

Wasyl Medwit, O.S.B.M.
- Auxiliary Bishop Emeritus of Ukrainian Catholic Archiepiscopal Exarchate of Donetsk-Kharkiv
- Church: Ukrainian Greek Catholic Church
- Appointed: 17 March 2009
- Term ended: 25 October 2013
- Other posts: Archiepiscopal Exarch of Kyiv-Vyshhorod (1997–2004); Titular Bishop of Hadriane (since 1994)

Orders
- Ordination: 31 May 1984 (Priest) by Pope John Paul II
- Consecration: 12 July 1994 (Bishop) by Myroslav Ivan Lubachivsky

Personal details
- Born: Ihor Medwit; 23 July 1949 Przemyśl, Poland
- Died: 12 September 2024 (aged 75) Warsaw, Poland

Wasyl Ihor Medwit, O.S.B.M. (Ukrainian: Василь Ігор Медвіт; 23 July 1949 – 12 September 2024) was a Polish-born Ukrainian Greek Catholic hierarch, Titular Bishop of Hadriane since 30 March 1994. Before it, from 30 March 1994 until 30 September 1996 he served as an Auxiliary Bishop of Lviv, from 30 September 1996 until 8 November 2002 as Apostolic Visitor in Kazakhstan and the Middle Asia, from 20 September 1997 until 6 December 2004 as an Archiepiscopal Exarch of Kyiv-Vyshhorod, from 6 December 2004 until 17 March 2009 as a Curial Bishop of the Kyiv-Halych and from 17 March 2009 until 25 October 2013 as an Auxiliary Bishop of Donetsk-Kharkiv.

== Biography ==
Medwit was born in the family of ethnic Ukrainian Greek-Catholics in Przemyśl, in post-war Poland. After the completing his state education, he subsequently joined the Order of Saint Basil the Great, where he made his profession on 2 February 1980 and his solemn profession on 1 January 1984. Medwit was ordained as priest on 31 May 1984, after theological studies in Rome.

He remained in Italy and served as a vice-rector in the Ukrainian Pontifical College of Saint Josaphat (1984–1986). After his returning to Poland and a service as a parish priest, he was elected as a Protohegumen (Provincial Superior) of the Bazilians in Poland (1989–1994).

On 30 March 1994, Medwit was confirmed by Pope John Paul II and on 12 July 1994 consecrated to the Episcopate as auxiliary bishop. The principal consecrator was Cardinal Myroslav Ivan Lubachivsky, the Head of the Ukrainian Greek Catholic Church.

Medwit died at the Basilian monastery of the Dormition of Mother of God in Warsaw, on 12 September 2024, at the age of 75.

Catholic Church titles
Preceded by Angelo Prinetto	Titular Bishop of Hadriane; 1994–2024	Succeeded by Vacant
New title	Apostolic Visitor in Kazakhstan and the Middle Asia; 1996–2002	Succeeded by Fr. Vasyl Hovera (as Apostolic Delegate)
Preceded by Mykhaylo Koltun	Archepiscopal Exarch of Kyiv-Vyshhorod; 1997–2004	Succeeded by Lubomyr Husar (as Major Archbishop)
