= Ukrainian Catholic Archeparchy of Kyiv =

Archeparchy of the Ukrainian Greek Catholic Church

Coordinates: 50.4500°N 30.5000°E

Archeparchy of Kyiv Archieparchia Kioviensis Київська архієпархія
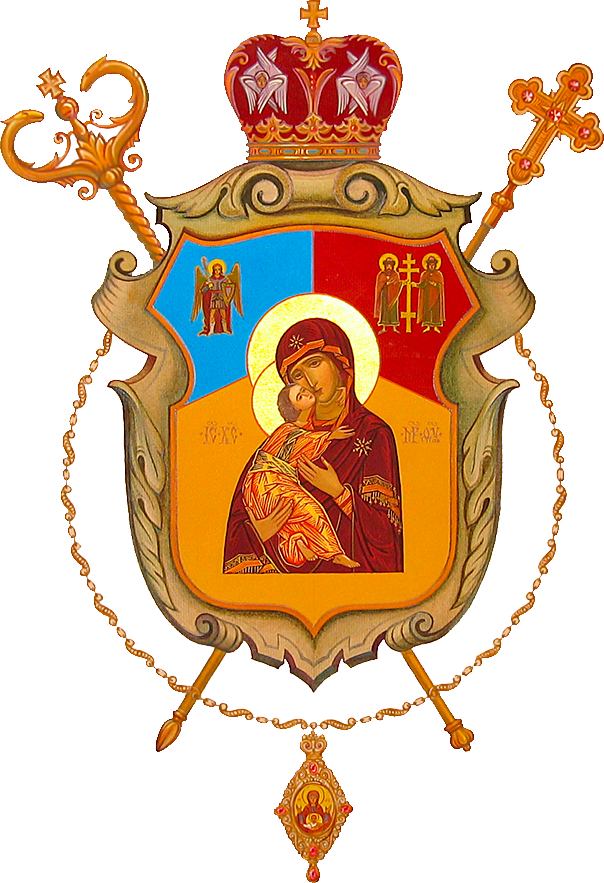

Location
- Country: Ukraine
- Territory: Ukraine
- Headquarters: Kyiv, Ukraine

Statistics
- Area: 178,270 km^{2} (68,830 sq mi)
- Population: Total: 12,500,000

Information
- Sui iuris church: Ukrainian Greek Catholic
- Rite: Byzantine Rite
- Cathedral: Cathedral of the Resurrection of Christ, Kyiv

Current leadership
- Pope: Leo XIV
- Major Archbishop: Sviatoslav Shevchuk
- Metropolitan Archbishop: Sviatoslav Shevchuk Archbishop of the Ukrainian Catholic Archeparchy of Kyiv
- Auxiliary Bishops: Josyf Milyan Auxiliary Bishop of the Ukrainian Catholic Archeparchy of Kyiv

Map

Website
- http://ugcc.kiev.ua/

The Archeparchy of Kyiv is a Ukrainian Greek Catholic archeparchy of the Catholic Church, that is located in the central part of Ukraine. The ordinary is the Archeparch of Kyiv who is also the Metropolitan of the ecclesiastical province of Kyiv-Halych and the Primate of the Ukrainian Greek Catholic Church. The incumbent Archeparch is Sviatoslav Shevchuk. He is assisted by two auxiliary bishops: Bohdan Dzyurakh and Josyf Milyan. The Archeparchy of Kyiv founded the newspaper "Sobor".

== History ==
On 25 November 1995, the Archiepiscopal Exarchate of Kyiv-Vyshhorod was created under the jurisdiction of the Archeparchy of Lviv. Originally, it covered all central, eastern and southern parts of Ukraine. Later (2002-2003), it lost territory to form new exarchates for the eastern and southern regions. On 6 December 2004, the remaining central region of the Exarchate was transformed into the Archeparchy of Kyiv. Since the so-called "Synod of Polotsk" in 1838, Kyiv had been deprived of its own see. At the same time, an ecclesiastical province ("major archeparchy") was erected. The Archeparchy of Kyiv became the principal see of the newly created Major Archeparchy of Kyiv-Halych, and thus a primatial see of the Ukrainian Greek Catholic Church. The episcopal seat of the "Metropolis of Galicia" was transferred from St. George's Cathedral in the city of Lviv to the Cathedral of the Resurrection of Christ in the capital city of Ukraine — Kyiv. On 21 November 2011, the Major Archeparchy lost three suffragan sees: Buchach (Bučač) and Kolomyia–Chernivtsi and Kamyanets; as a result, the Archeparchy of Kyiv is the sole territory of the Major Archeparchy of Kyiv-Halych.

== Episcopal ordinaries ==
Archiepiscopal Exarchs of Kyiv–Vyshhorod

- Mykhaylo Koltun, C.Ss.R. (1996.11.13 – 1997.11.07), Titular Bishop of Casæ in Pamphylia (1996.11.13 – 1997.11.07), also Apostolic Administrator of Zboriv (Ukraine) (1996.11.13 – 1997.11.07), being previously its Eparch (1993.04.20 – 1996.11.13); later again Eparch of Zboriv (1997.11.07 – 2000.07.21) and Eparch of Sokal–Zhovkva (Ukraine) (2000.07.21 – ...)
- Wasyl Medwit, O.S.B.M. (1997.09.20 – 2004.12.06), Titular Bishop of Hadriane, previously Auxiliary Eparch of Lviv of the Ukrainians (Ukraine) (1994.03.30 – 1996.09.30) and Apostolic Visitor in Kazakhstan and Central Asia of the Ukrainians (1996.09.30 – 2002.10); later Bishop of Curia of the Ukrainians (2004.12.06 – 2009.03.17) & Auxiliary Bishop of Donetsk–Kharkiv of the Ukrainians (Ukraine) (2009.03.17 – 2013.10.25)

Archbishops of Kyiv / Major Archbishops of Kyiv–Halych

- Cardinal Lubomyr Husar, M.S.U., previously Titular Bishop of Nisa in Lycia ([1977] 1996.02.22 – 2001.01.25), Auxiliary Bishop of Lviv of the Ukrainians (Ukraine) (1996.10.14 – 2000.12.16) and Apostolic Administrator of Lviv of the Ukrainians (2000.12.16 – 2001.01.25), Major Archbishop of Lviv of the Ukrainians (Ukraine) ([2001.01.25] 2001.01.26 – 2004.12.06), also President of Synod of the Ukrainian Catholic Church (2001.01.26 – 2011.02.10); created Cardinal-Priest of Santa Sofia a Via Boccea (2001.02.21 [2001.11.17] – ...);
  - Auxiliary Eparch Bohdan Dzyurakh, C.SS.R. (2005.12.21 – 2009.07.29)
  - Auxiliary Eparch Dionisio Lachovicz, O.S.B.M., ?term?
- Apostolic Administrator Ihor Vozniak, C.SS.R. (2011.02.10 – 2011.03.25)
- Sviatoslav Shevchuk (2011.03.25 – ...), also President of Synod of the Ukrainian Catholic Church (2011.03.25 – ...); previously Titular Bishop of Castra Galbæ (2009.01.14 – 2011.03.23), Auxiliary Eparch of Santa María del Patrocinio en Buenos Aires of the Ukrainians (Argentina) (2009.01.14 – 2010.03.10), then that see's apostolic administrator (2010.03.10 – 2011.03.23)
  - Auxiliary Eparch Josyf Milyan, (M.S.U.) (2009.04.16 – ...)
