= Petro Loza =

Roman Catholic bishop

Petro Loza CSsR
- Titular Bishop of Panium, Auxiliary Bishop of Ukrainian Catholic Eparchy of Sokal–Zhovkva
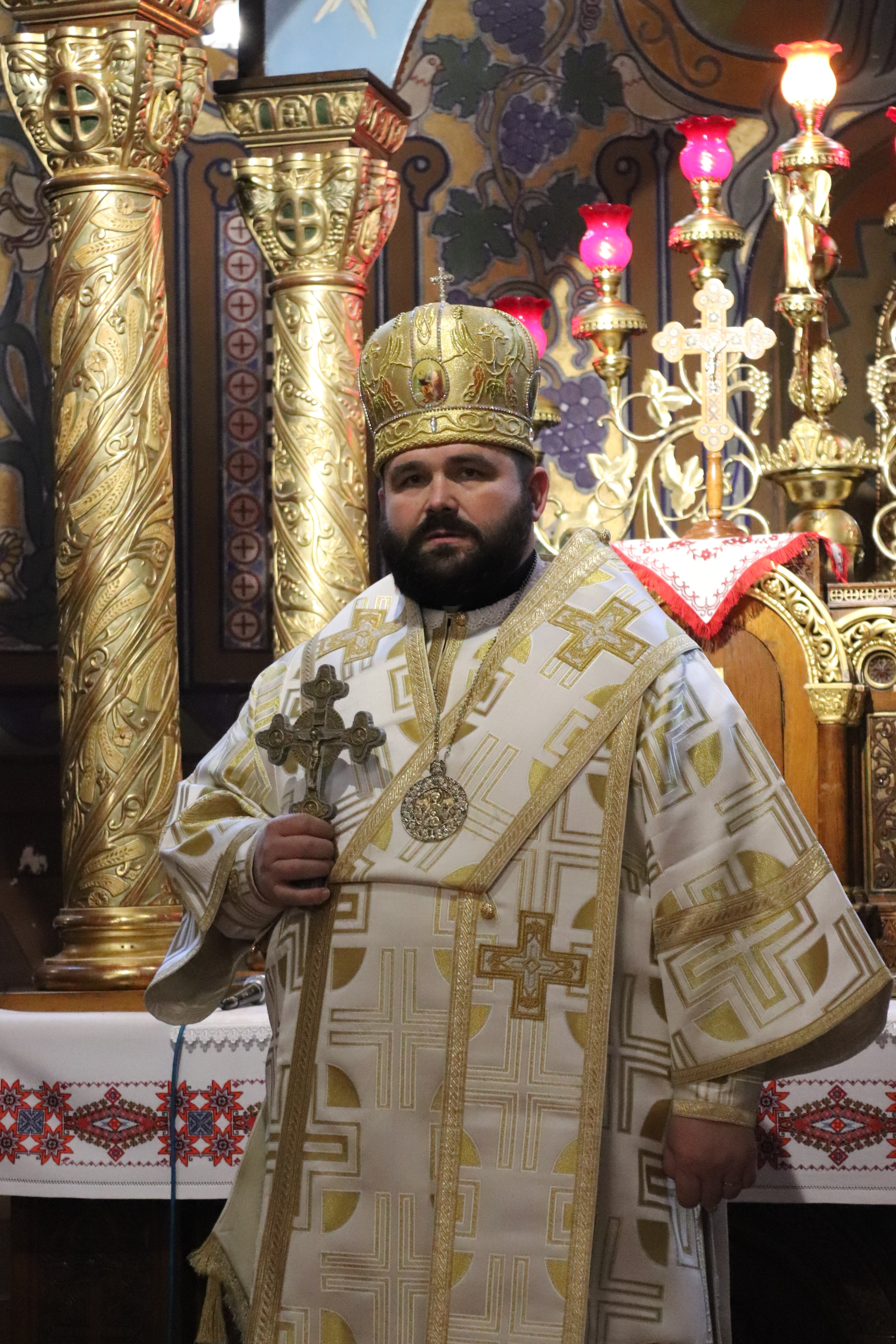
- Church: Ukrainian Greek Catholic Church
- Appointed: 12 April 2018

Orders
- Ordination: 26 August 2007 (Priest) by Ihor Vozniak
- Consecration: 12 July 2018 (Bishop) by Sviatoslav Shevchuk

Personal details
- Born: Petro Loza; 3 June 1979 (age 47) Kolodentsi, Lviv Oblast, Ukrainian SSR
- Education: University of Innsbruck
- Coat of arms

Bishop Petro Loza CSsR (Ukrainian: Петро Лоза; born 3 June 1979 in Kolodentsi, Kamianka-Buzka Raion, Lviv Oblast, Ukrainian SSR) is a Ukrainian Greek Catholic hierarch as the Titular Bishop of Panium and Auxiliary bishop of Sokal–Zhovkva since 12 April 2018.

== Life ==
Bishop Loza, after graduation of the school education, joined the Congregation of the Most Holy Redeemer in 1997; he had a profession in 1998 and a solemn profession in 2003, and was ordained as priest on 26 August 2007, after graduation of the Major Redemptorists Theological Seminary in Lviv, Ukraine (1998–2001) and the University of Innsbruck, Austria (2001–2009). During 2011–2014 he served as a provincial assistant for the Ukrainian Redemptorists Province and from 2014 until 2018 was a superior in the Sts. Peter and Paul church in Chernihiv.

On 12 April 2018, he was confirmed by Pope Francis as the first Auxiliary Bishop of Ukrainian Catholic Eparchy of Sokal–Zhovkva, Ukraine and Titular Bishop of Panium. On 12 July 2018, he was consecrated as bishop by Major Archbishop Sviatoslav Shevchuk and other hierarchs of the Ukrainian Greek Catholic Church in the Sts Peter and Paul Cathedral in Sokal.

Catholic Church titles
Preceded by Atanáz Orosz	Titular Bishop of Panium; 2018–	Succeeded by Incumbent
