= Church of the Resurrection, Kalne, Zboriv urban hromada =

Greek Catholic church in Kalne, Ukraine

Church of the Resurrection Церква Воскресіння Христового
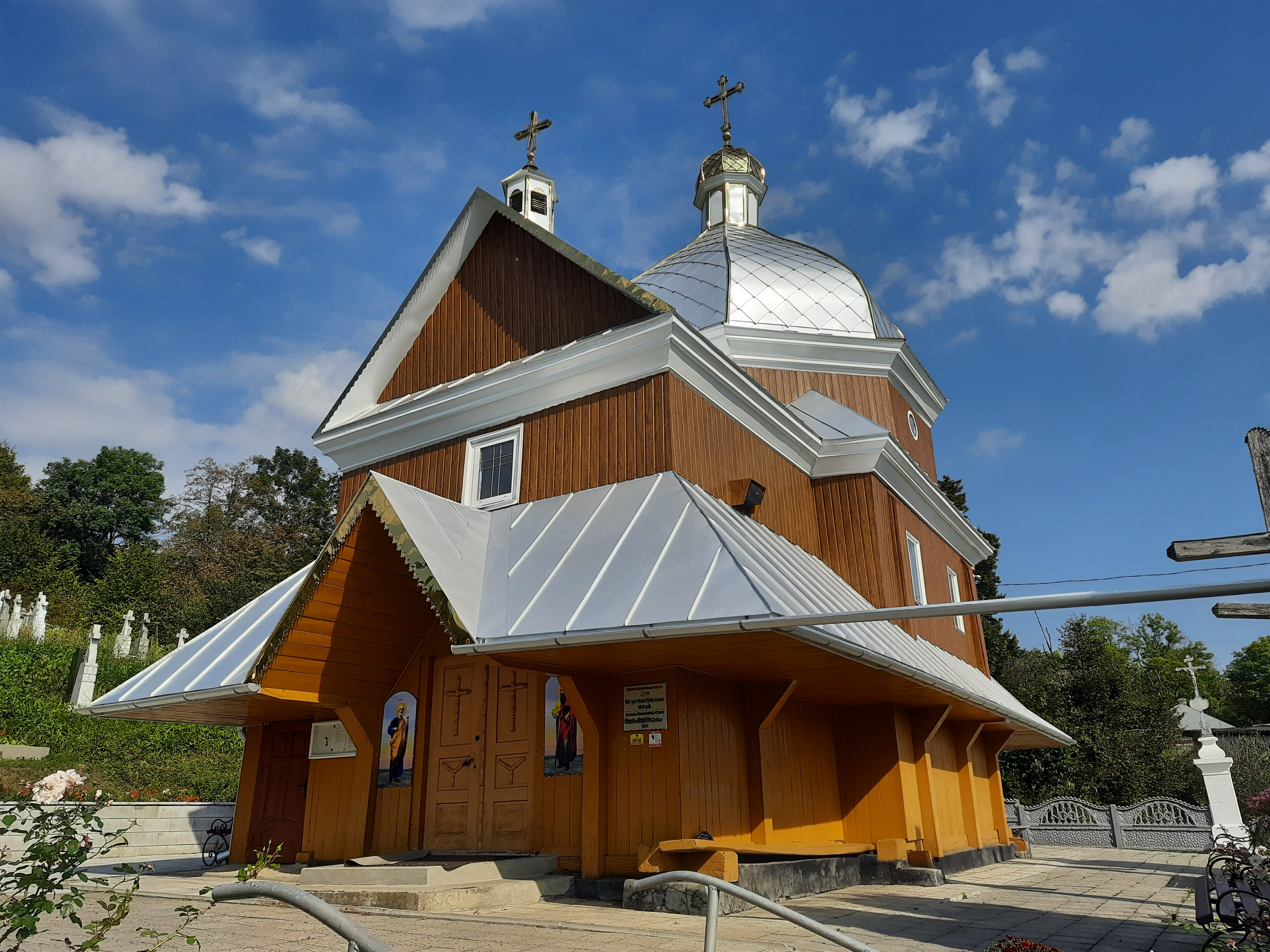

- Location within Ternopil Oblast

Religion
- Affiliation: Ukrainian Greek Catholic Church

Location
- Location: Kalne, Zboriv urban hromada, Ternopil Raion, Ternopil Oblast, Ukraine
- Coordinates: 49°38′04.3″N 24°58′22.5″E

Architecture
- Completed: 1811

Church of the Resurrection (Ukrainian: Церква Воскресіння Христового) is a Greek Catholic parish church (UGCC) in Kalne of the Zboriv urban hromada of the Ternopil Raion of the Ternopil Oblast.

== History ==
The solemn consecration of the church took place on the second day of the Easter holidays in 1811. Since then, it has been known as the Church of the Resurrection of the Lord of the Zolochiv Deanery of the Lviv Archeparchy of the UGCC.

According to village legends, the predecessor of the modern church was a wooden church that burned down. The charred building was sold to the village of Krasnosiltsi, and a new one, also wooden, was brought from Zaliztsi.

In the post-war period, the Soviet authorities deprived the parishioners of Kalne of the opportunity to pray in their native church. However, people kept the keys and secretly opened the church for communal prayers every Sunday and on holidays. Official permission to resume services was obtained in the autumn of 1987, but the church then belonged to the ROC. In 1992, the community returned to the fold of the UGCC.

On 21 September 2008, during the celebration of the 560th anniversary of the first written mention of the village, Cardinal Lubomyr Husar consecrated a monument on the grave of his maternal grandfather, the priest Luka Demchuk.

The following communities are active at the parish: the Sodality of Our Lady, Mothers in Prayer, and the Altar Society.

== Priests ==
- Dushynskyi (1780s)
- Petro Liakhovych ([1832]–1834)
- Vasyl Prokopovych (1834—1838, administrator; 1838–1840+)
- Yakym Zarytskyi (1840–1842)
- Tymotei Lutseika (1842–1843)
- Ivan Khromovskyi (1843–1855)
- Petro Hupalo
- Kopertynskyi (1855–1876)
- Yosyp Chyrovskyi (1876–1878, administrator; 1878–1882)
- Mykola Yanovych (1882–1883, administrator; 1883–1903)
- Luka Demchuk (1903—1904, administrator; 1904—1929+)
- Mykola Buriak (1929—1932, administrator; 1932—1944])
- Teodor Bula (1952–1969)
- Hryhorii Syroid (1969–1986)
- Pavlo Buk (1987)
- Mykhailo Venherak (1988–1992)
- Volodymyr Shevtsiv (1992–1995)
- Hryhorii Zozuliak (1995–1999)
- Oleh Didukh (2000–2008)
- Ivan Havdiak (since 2008)

== Sources ==
- Храм Воскресіння Христового / Автор тексту та упоряди. П. І. Козловський, керівник проєкту о. І. Гавдяк. — Тернопіль: ТзОВ «Тернограф», 2011. — 32 с.; іл.
- Чорна Н. "Найважчими для парафіян були радянські часи" // Вільне життя плюс. — 2011. — № 36 (11 трав.). — С. 6.
- Приступа І. 200-річчя церкви в Кальному святкували з крашанками. на деревах // Нова Тернопільська газета. — 2011. — С. 3.
- Кальне, Дерев'яні церкви Західної України
