= Mykhaylo Koltun =

Ukrainian Catholic priest (born 1949)

Mykhaylo Koltun, C.Ss.R.
- Eparchial Bishop of Ukrainian Catholic Eparchy of Sokal–Zhovkva
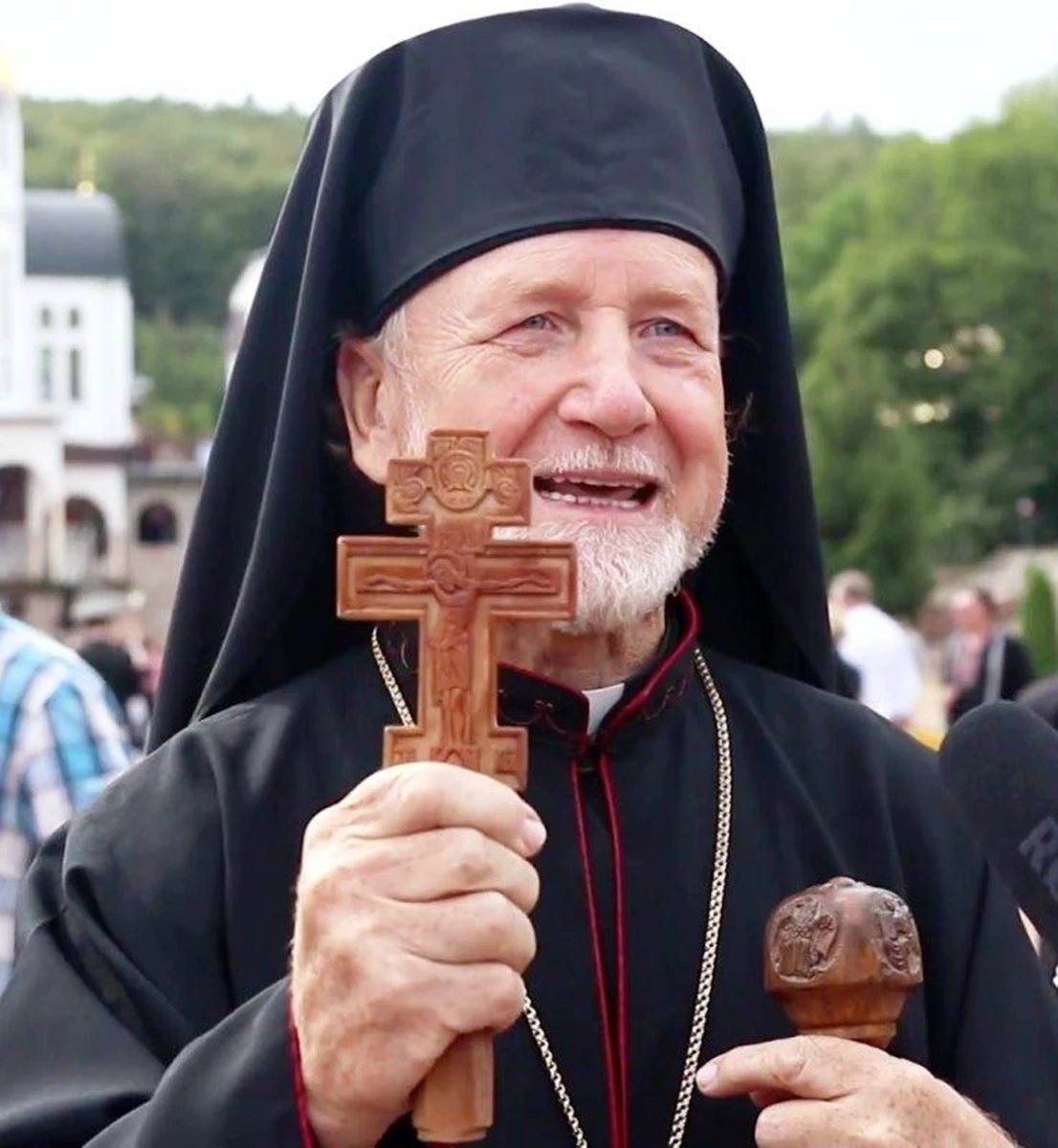
- Church: Ukrainian Greek Catholic Church
- Elected: 21 July 2000
- Predecessor: new creation
- Other posts: Bishop of Zboriv (1993–1996, 1997–2000); Exarch of Kyiv-Vyshhorod (1996–1997)

Orders
- Ordination: 13 Dec 1981 (Priest) by Volodymyr Sterniuk
- Consecration: 19 Sep 1993 (Bishop) by Myroslav Ivan Lubachivsky

Personal details
- Born: Mykhaylo Pavlovych Koltun; 29 March 1949 (age 77) Polonychi, Busk Raion, Lviv Oblast, Ukrainian SSR

Bishop Mykhaylo Koltun, C.Ss.R. (Ukrainian: Михайло Колтун; born 29 March 1949 in Polonychi, Busk Raion, Lviv Oblast, Ukrainian SSR) is a Ukrainian Greek Catholic hierarch as an Eparchial Bishop of Sokal–Zhovkva since 21 July 2000. Previously he served as an Eparchial Bishop of Zboriv from 20 April 1993 until 13 November 1996 and the second time from 7 November 1997 until 21 July 2000; and as Titular Bishop of Casae in Pamphylia and Archepiscopal Exarch of Kyiv-Vyshhorod from 13 November 1996 until 7 November 1997.

== Life ==
Bishop Koltun was born in the family of clandestine Greek-Catholics Pavlo and Stanislava (née Kret) Koltun. After graduation of the school education, he graduated the college of industrial automation in Lviv and made a compulsory service in the Soviet Army. Then he worked in the concrete products plant from 1972 until 1989.

During all this time he was clandestine member of the Congregation of the Most Holy Redeemer, where he had a profession in 1975 and a solemn profession on 8 November 1981. Koltun was ordained as priest on 13 December 1981, after completing clandestine theological studies. From 1990 until 1993 he openly served as priest, missionary and founder of the new Greek-Catholic parishes.

On 20 April 1993 Fr. Koltun was elected and on 19 September 1993 was consecrated to the Episcopate as the first Eparchial Bishop of the new created Ukrainian Catholic Eparchy of Zboriv. His consecration was the first open one in time, when the "Catacomb Church" became free, after Dissolution of the Soviet Union. The principal consecrator was Cardinal Myroslav Ivan Lubachivsky, the Head of the Ukrainian Greek Catholic Church.

Catholic Church titles
New title	Bishop of Zboriv; 1993–1996	Succeeded by himself as Archepiscopal Administrator
Preceded by Vacant	Titular Bishop of Casae in Pamphylia; 1996–1997	Succeeded by Vacant
Preceded by himself as Eparchial Bishop	Archepiscopal Administrator of the Eparchy of Zboriv; 1996–1997	Succeeded by himself as Eparchial Bishop
Preceded by Lubomyr Husar	Archepiscopal Exarch of Kyiv-Vyshhorod; 1996–1997	Succeeded by Wasyl Medwit
Preceded by himself as Archepiscopal Administrator	Bishop of Zboriv; 1997–2000	Succeeded by Suppressed
New title	Bishop of Sokal–Zhovkva; 2000–present	Succeeded by Incumbent
