= Kolodiivka, Ternopil Oblast =

Rural locality in Ternopil Oblast, Ukraine

Kolodiivka Колодіївка
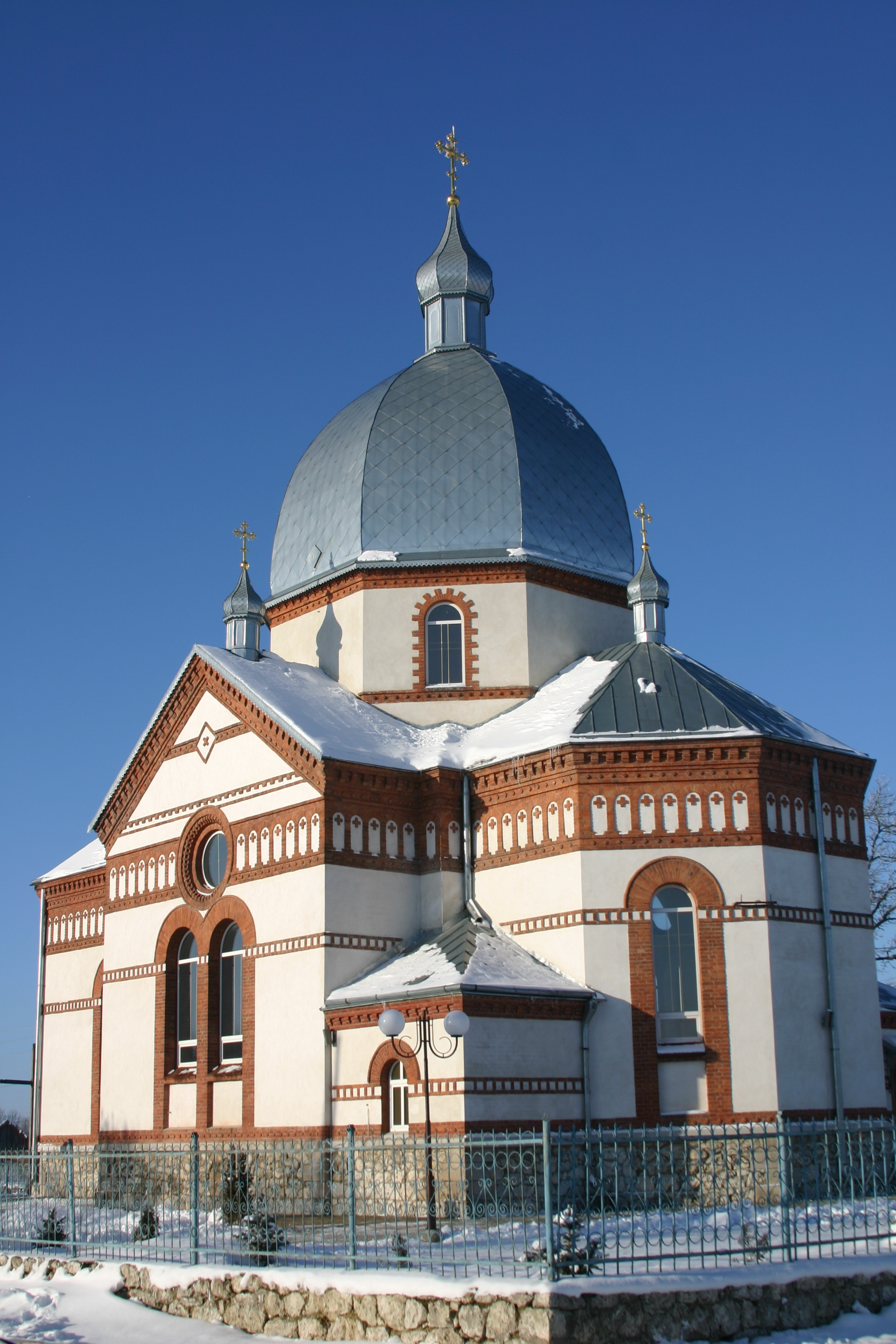
- Church of Saint Demetrius

- Location in Ternopil Oblast
- Coordinates: 49°28′18″N 25°54′41″E
- Country: Ukraine
- Oblast: Ternopil Oblast
- Raion: Ternopil Raion
- Hromada: Skalat urban hromada
- Postal code: 47844

Kolodiivka is a Ukrainian village located in Ternopil Raion of Ternopil Oblast. It is near the city of Ternopil, and located in the Skalat region. Kolodiivka belongs to Skalat urban hromada, one of the hromadas of Ukraine.

== History ==
The first written mention is in 1568.

Until 18 July 2020, Kolodiivka belonged to Pidvolochysk Raion. The raion was abolished in July 2020, as part of the administrative reform of Ukraine, which reduced the number of raions of Ternopil Oblast to three. The area of Pidvolochysk Raion was merged into Ternopil Raion.

== Religion ==
- Saint Demetrius church (1904, brick, UGCC)
- Saint Theodore the Studite Monastery (1995, brick, moved from Rome by the efforts of Cardinal Liubomyr Huzar, UGCC)
- Church of Saints Stanislaus and Anna (restored in the early twenty-first century, RCC)

== People ==
- Ostap Yurchynskyi (1871–1943), Ukrainian Galician public and political figure, lawyer, doctor of law
