= Saint Theodore the Studite Monastery, Kolodiivka, Ternopil Oblast =

Saint Theodore the Studite Monastery
- Монастир святого Теодора Студита
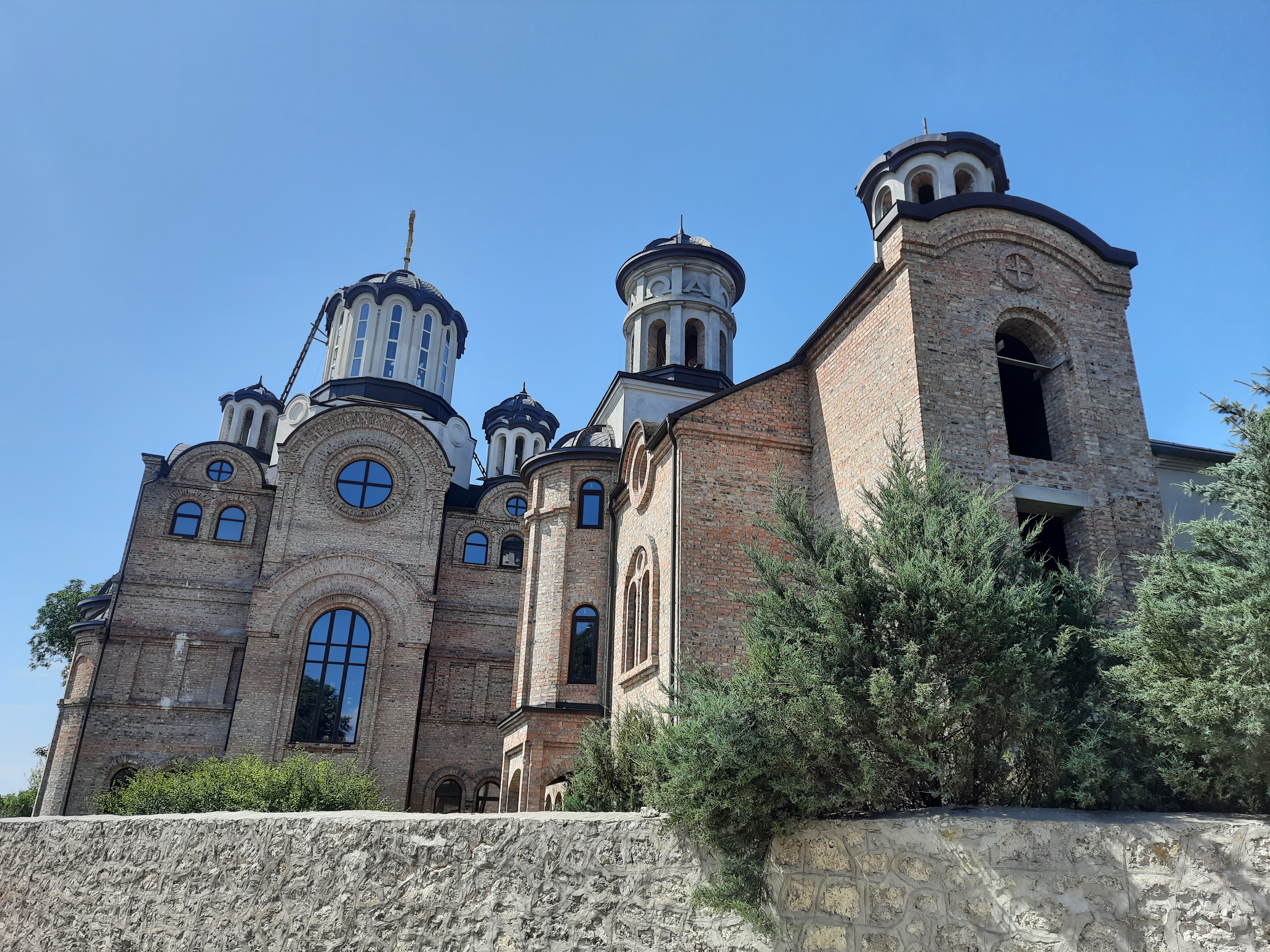

- Location within Ternopil Oblast Location within Ukraine
- Interactive map of Saint Theodore the Studite Monastery

Monastery information
- Denomination: Ukrainian Greek Catholic Church

Architecture
- Completion date: 1995

Site
- Location: Kolodiivka, Ternopil Oblast
- Country: Ukraine
- Coordinates: 49°28′23.5″N 25°54′57.4″E

Saint Theodore the Studite Monastery is a monastery of the Ukrainian Greek Catholic Church in the village of Kolodiivka, Ternopil Oblast.

== History ==
On a hill in the center of Kolodiivka, there once stood a centuries-old church, likely dating back to the 16th century. In 1904, the community replaced this old wooden building with a new stone church, which was built on the relics of Saint Demetrius. As a result, the church’s annual holiday is celebrated on Saint Demetrius’ Day.

Tragically, on 28 June 1941, Father Yosyf Hrytsai was found crucified on the door of the Ternopil prison, mutilated beyond recognition.

Throughout the Soviet era, up until 25 August 1990, the parish was served by priests of the Moscow Patriarchate, and services continued without interruption.

On 25 August 1990, the community of Kolodiivka returned to the Greek Catholic Church, initially without a priest. Under the guidance of Father Illia Dovhoshyi, the old building was not restored. In 1995, Bishop Mykhailo Sabryha consecrated the building, transferring it to the Monastery of Saint Theodore Studite. At the time, the abbot of the monastery was His Beatitude Liubomyr Huzar. In September 1997, Father Illia also led missions with the participation of the monastery’s fathers and brothers. The monastery operates under diocesan law.

The young monastic community was founded in August 1995 with the blessing of Bishop Sofron Dmyterko, the Ordinary of the Ivano-Frankivsk Eparchy. In July 1996, the monastic community of brothers, with the blessing of Liubomyr Huzar (then Exarch of Kyiv-Vyshhorod), settled in the Monastery of Saint Theodore in Kolodiivka, taking up residence in the old school building. Construction on the monastery is still ongoing.

The Monastery of Saint Theodore Studite is a contemplative monastery dedicated to constant prayer and contemplation. It currently has 22 members, including 3 hieromonks, 9 hieromonks, 2 schismatics, 4 cloistered monks, 2 cassock monks, and 2 novices.

The parish holds Sunday catechesis, and a prayer group called "Holy Trinity", primarily for students, is also active.

== Pastors ==
- at. Klymentii Sliuzar (1892–1913),
- at. Yosyf Hrytsai (1913–1914, 1918–1928),
- at. Ivan Tsymbala,
- at. Illia Dovhoshyia (14 February 1993 – ?),
- His Beatitude Liubomyr Huzar,
- at. Hryhorii Antonii Planchak (since 3 May 1997).
