= Volodymyr Hrutsa =

Ukrainian bishop (born 1976)

Volodymyr Hrutsa CSsR
- Titular Bishop of Bahanna, Auxiliary Bishop of Ukrainian Catholic Archeparchy of Lviv
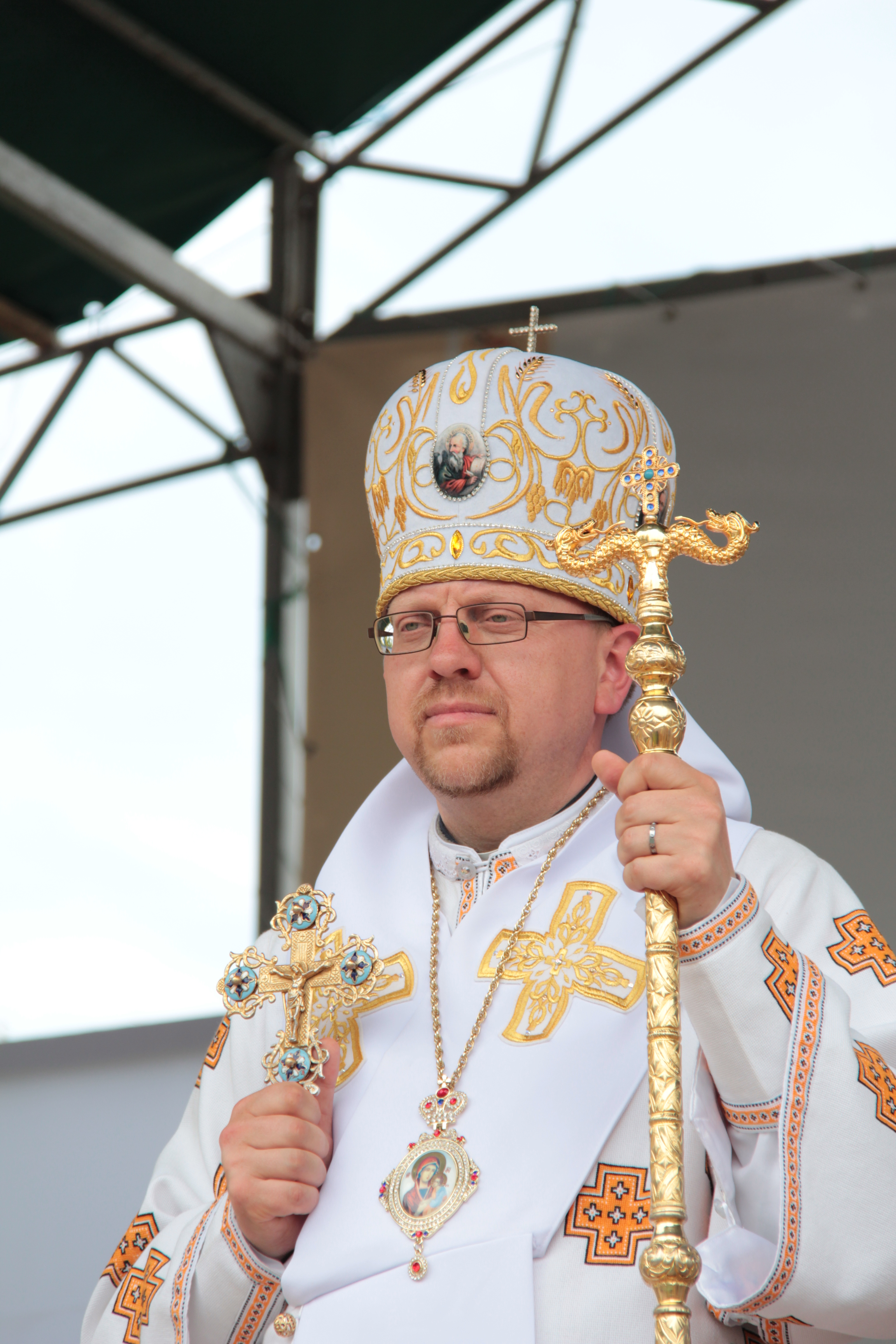
- Church: Ukrainian Greek Catholic Church
- Appointed: 14 January 2016

Orders
- Ordination: 12 Jul 2001 (Priest) by Andres Sapelak
- Consecration: 7 Apr 2016 (Bishop) by Sviatoslav Shevchuk

Personal details
- Born: Volodymyr Volodymyrovych Hrutsa; 19 August 1976 (age 50) Dobromyl, Lviv Oblast, Ukrainian SSR
- Education: Pontifical University of John Paul II
- Coat of arms

Bishop Volodymyr Hrutsa CSsR (Ukrainian: Володимир Груца; born 19 August 1976 in Dobromyl, Lviv Oblast, Ukrainian SSR) is a Ukrainian Greek Catholic hierarch as the Titular Bishop of Bahanna and Auxiliary bishop of Lviv since 14 January 2016.

== Life ==
Bishop Hrutsa, after graduation of the school education, joined the Congregation of the Most Holy Redeemer in 1994; he had a profession on 19 August 1995 and a solemn profession on 19 August 2001, and was ordained as priest on 12 July 2001, after graduation of the Major Redemptorists Theological Seminary in Tuchów, Poland and Pontifical Theological Academy in Kraków, Poland. Then he continued his studies in the University of Innsbruck, Austria with Doctor of Sacred Theology degree. During 2013–2016 he served as a Master of novices for the Ukrainian Redemptorists Province.

On 14 January 2016 he was confirmed by the Pope Francis as the second Auxiliary Bishop of Lviv, Ukraine and Titular Bishop of Bahanna. On 7 April 2016 he was consecrated as bishop by Major Archbishop Sviatoslav Shevchuk and other hierarchs of the Ukrainian Greek Catholic Church.

Catholic Church titles
Preceded by Titus Joseph Mdoe	Titular Bishop of Bahanna; 2016–present	Incumbent
Preceded by Venedykt Aleksiychuk	Auxiliary Bishop of Lviv; 2016–present	Incumbent
