= Kalne, Zboriv urban hromada, Ternopil Raion, Ternopil Oblast =

Rural locality in Ternopil Oblast, Ukraine

Kal'ne Кальне
- Village
- Location within Ternopil Oblast
- Coordinates: 49°37′49″N 24°58′37″E
- Country: Ukraine
- Oblast: Ternopil Oblast
- District: Ternopil Raion
- Established: 1492

Area
  - Total: 2.400 km^{2} (0.927 sq mi)
- Elevation: 299 m (981 ft)

Population
  - Total: 537
  - Density: 224/km^{2} (580/sq mi)
- Time zone: UTC+2 (EET)
  - Summer (DST): UTC+3 (EEST)
- Postal code: 47270
- Area code: +380 3540
- Website: село Кальне/райцентр Зборів (in Ukrainian)

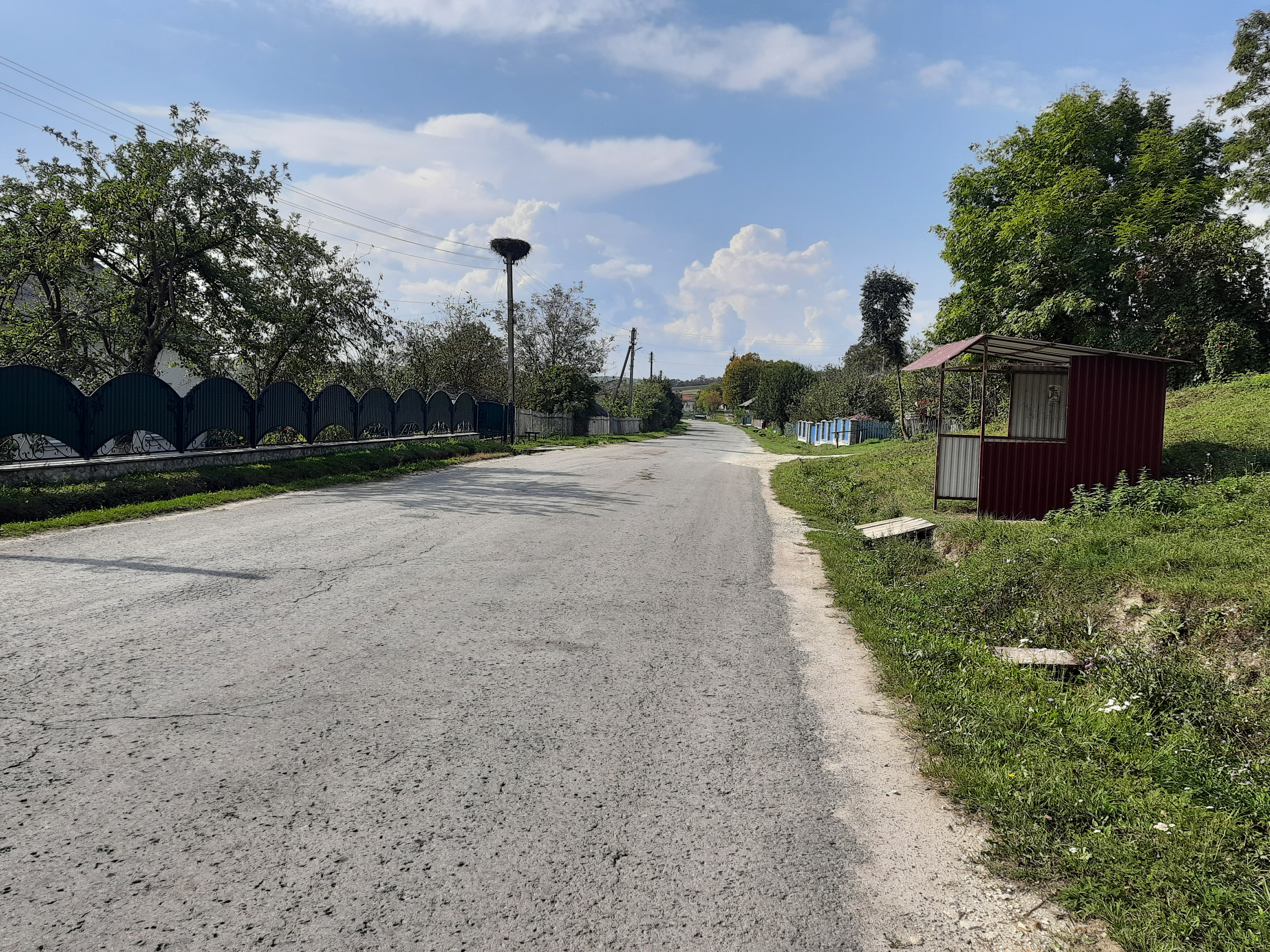
Central Street S. Kalne Ternopil district, Ternopil region

Kalne (Ukrainian: Кальне́) is a village (selo) located in Ternopil Raion (district), Ternopil Oblast (province of Western Ukraine). It belongs to Zboriv urban hromada, one of the hromadas of Ukraine.

The area of the village is 6,295 km^{2} and it has a population of 537 people. Local government is administered by Kalnenska village council, which consists of two villages: Kalne and Zhabynia.

== Geography ==
The village is located on the banks of the river Zvarych (basin of the Dniester) at an altitude of 299 metres (980 ft) above sea level.
It is situated 53 kilometres (33 mi) from the regional center Ternopil, 16 kilometres (9.9 mi) from the district center Zboriv and 4 kilometres (2.5 mi) from an urban-type settlement Pomoryany.

== History and Attractions ==
The first written mention of the village dates back to year 1492. In 1811 in the village been constructed a wooden church. It is a Church of the Resurrection (1811).

Until 18 July 2020, Kalne belonged to Zboriv Raion. The raion was abolished in July 2020 as part of the administrative reform of Ukraine, which reduced the number of raions of Ternopil Oblast to three. The area of Zboriv Raion was merged into Ternopil Raion.

The priest Luka Demchuk (1873–1929) has been headed the parish of the village Kal'ne from 1909 to 1929. He has been grandfather of the UGCC of Cardinal Lubomyr Husar.

== Religion ==
- Church of the Resurrection (1811, wooden, UGCC)

== Literature ==
- "Kalne 2.) ". Geographical Dictionary of the Kingdom of Poland (in Polish). 3. Warszawa: Kasa im. Józefa Mianowskiego. 1882. p. 703.
