= Ukrainian Catholic Eparchy of Sokal–Zhovkva =

Ukrainian Greek Catholic eparchy in Ukraine

Coordinates: 50°48′N 24°28′E

Eparchy of Sokal-Zhovkva Eparchia Socaliensis-Zhovkviesis Ucrainorum Українська Греко-Католицька Сокальсько-Жовківська Єпархія

Location
- Country: Ukraine
- Territory: 6 Raions of Lviv Oblast
- Ecclesiastical province: Archeparchy of Lviv
- Headquarters: Zhovkva, Lviv Oblast, Ukraine

Statistics
- Area: 6,991 km^{2} (2,699 sq mi)
- Population: Total; Catholics: (as of 2023); 475,550; 302,300 (63.6%)
- Parishes: 364

Information
- Denomination: Catholic Church
- Sui iuris church: Ukrainian Greek Catholic
- Rite: Byzantine
- Established: 21 July 2000; 26 years ago
- Cathedral: Ukrainian Catholic Cathedral of Saints Apostles Peter and Paul
- Secular priests: 247 (all Diocesan)

Current leadership
- Pope: Leo XIV
- Major Archbishop: Major Archbishop Sviatoslav Shevchuk
- Eparch: Petro Loza, C.Ss.R.
- Metropolitan Archbishop: Ihor Vozniak Metropolitan of the Ukrainian Catholic Archeparchy of Lviv
- Bishops emeritus: Mykhaylo Koltun, C.Ss.R.

Map

Website
- Ukrainian Catholic Eparchy of Sokal-Zhovkva

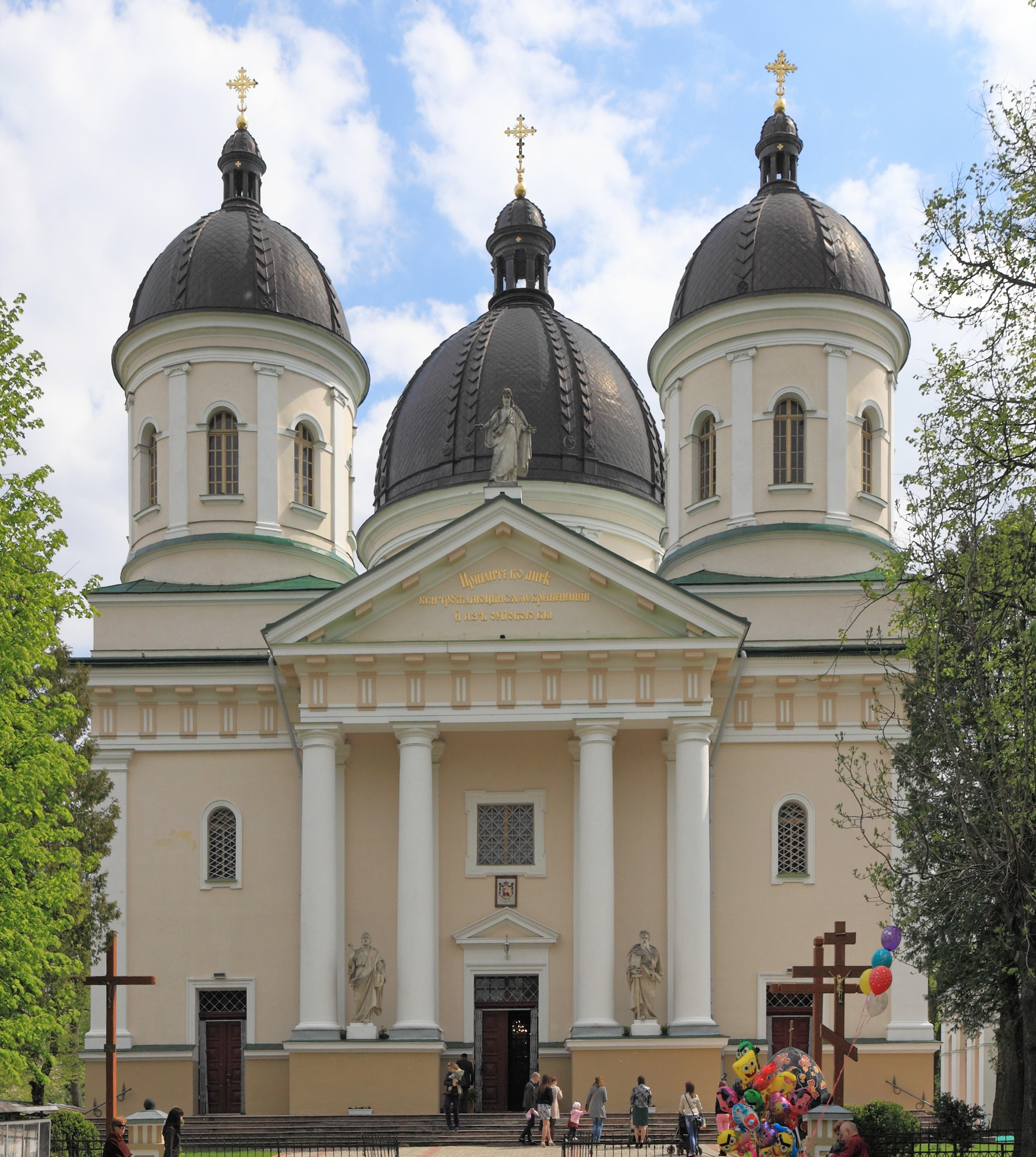
Cathedral of Saints Apostles Peter and Paul

The Eparchy of Sokal – Zhovkva is an eparchy of the Ukrainian Greek Catholic Church, in the archeparchy (archdiocese) of Lviv in Ukraine.

== History ==
- 21 July 2000: Established as Eparchy of Sokal from the Ukrainian Catholic Archeparchy of Lviv and the suppressed Ukrainian Catholic Eparchy of Zboriv.
- 20 September 2006: Name Changed as Eparchy of Sokal-Zhovkva from Eparchy of Sokal.

== Eparchial bishops ==
The following is a list of the bishops of Sokal-Zhovkva and their terms of service:

- Mykhaylo Koltun, C.Ss.R. (21 Jul 2000 – 17 Oct 2024), retired
- Petro Loza, C.Ss.R. (17 Oct 2024 – Present)

== Other eparchial priests who became bishops ==
- Vasyl Ivasyuk (2000-2003), appointed Archiepiscopal Exarch of Odessa-Krym
