= Liubomyr Huzar =

Ukrainian Greek Catholic archbishop, Roman Catholic cardinal

His Eminent Beatitude Liubomyr Huzar
- Cardinal, Major Archbishop of Kyiv-Galicia
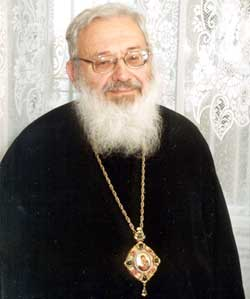
- Church: Ukrainian Greek Catholic Church
- Archdiocese: Kyiv
- Province: Kyiv
- Elected: 29 August 2005
- Term ended: 10 February 2011
- Predecessor: Myroslav Lubachivsky
- Successor: Sviatoslav Shevchuk
- Other post: Cardinal-Priest of S. Sofia a Via Boccea
- Previous posts: Titular Bishop of Nisa in Lycia (1996–2001); Major Archbishop of Lviv (2001–2004); Major Archbishop of Kyiv (2004–2011)

Orders
- Ordination: 30 March 1958 by Ambrozij Andrew Senyshyn
- Consecration: 2 April 1977 by Josyf Slipyj
- Created cardinal: 21 February 2001 by Pope John Paul II
- Rank: Cardinal-Priest

Personal details
- Born: Liubomyr Huzar; 26 February 1933 Lwów, Second Polish Republic (present day Lviv, Ukraine)
- Died: 31 May 2017 (aged 84) Kyiv, Ukraine
- Denomination: Ukrainian Greek Catholic
- Residence: Kniazhychi, Kyiv Oblast
- Coat of arms

Styles of Lubomyr Huzar
- Reference style: His Eminence
- Spoken style: Your Eminence
- Informal style: Cardinal
- See: Lviv (emeritus)

Liubomyr Huzar MSU (Ukrainian: Любомир Гузар; 26 February 1933 – 31 May 2017) was the Major Archbishop of the Ukrainian Greek Catholic Church and the first elected in independent Ukraine. He was also a cardinal of the Catholic Church. After the transfer of the see of Lviv to Kyiv in 2005, he was the Ukrainian Catholic Major Archbishop of Kyiv-Galicia. In February 2011 he became Major Archeparch Emeritus after he resigned due to ill health.

== Biography ==
=== Early life and ordination ===
He was born in the city of Lwów (now Lviv, Ukraine), in the family of Yaroslav Huzar and Rostyslava Demchuk (Demczuk). Luka Demchuk (Demczuk), the Priest of the Parish of the Resurrection of village Kal'ne from 1909 to 1929, was the maternal grandfather of Cardinal Liubomyr Huzar. Huzar emigrated with his parents in 1944 during World War II due to the advancing Soviet Army. At first the Huzar family briefly lived in Salzburg, Austria, then emigrated to the United States in 1949.

From 1950 to 1954 he studied at St. Basil College Seminary in Stamford, Connecticut. He studied at The Catholic University of America. Later studied at Fordham University in the United States, and was ordained a priest on 30 March 1958 for the Ukrainian Catholic Eparchy of Stamford.

=== Pastoral work ===
From 1958 to 1969, he taught at St. Basil College Seminary and was pastor at Holy Trinity Ukrainian Catholic Church in Kerhonkson, New York, between 1966 and 1969. In 1969, Huzar went to Rome, where he spent three years earning a doctorate in theology at the Pontifical Urbaniana University. He then entered the Monastery of the Studites in Castel Gandolfo in Italy, and was named its Superior in 1974.

=== Bishop ===
He was consecrated a bishop in 1977 in the Castel Gandolfo chapel by Major Archbishop Josyf Slipyj with help of titular bishop of Zigris Ivan Prasko and bishop of Toronto Isidore Borecky without papal approval (apostolic mandate) in an act which caused many irritations in the Roman Curia, as Roman Canon Law required papal permission for the consecration of a bishop. He was named Archimandrite (Archabbot) of the Studite Monks in Europe and America in 1978. He organised a new Saint Theodore the Studite monastery in Kolodiivka, Ternopil Oblast, Ukraine, in 1994, and was elected by the Synod of Bishops of the Ukrainian Church as exarch of the archiepiscopal exarchy of Kyiv and Vyshhorod in 1995, confirmed by the Pope the following year (February 1996) by nominating to the titular see of Nisa di Licia. On 14 October 1996 the UGCC Synod of Bishops named Huzar auxiliary of the Archbishop Major of Lviv as coadjutor with special delegations. In October 1999 he attended the 2nd Special Assembly for Europe. Although once a citizen of the United States, Huzar gave up his U.S. citizenship after transferring to Ukraine, and adopted the citizenship of Ukraine.

=== Major Archbishop and Cardinal ===
Styles of Liubomyr Huzar
- Reference style: His Eminence
- Spoken style: Your Eminence
- Informal style: Cardinal
- See: Kyiv and Halych

In December 2000, Pope John Paul II named Huzar apostolic administrator of the Ukrainian Greek Major-Archeparchy of Lviv, and in January 2001 the Ukrainian Greek synod elected him Major Archbishop which was approved by the Pope the next day. On 21 February of that year Pope John Paul II made Huzar Cardinal-Priest of Santa Sofia a Via Boccea. Cardinal Huzar was one of the three Eastern Catholics to participate in the papal conclave, 2005, the others being Ignace Daoud of the Syriac Catholic Church and Varkey Vithayathil of the Syro-Malabar Church. (Nasrallah Boutros Sfeir and Stéphanos II Ghattas of the Maronite Church and Coptic Catholic Church respectively were both over 80 and therefore could not take part.) At that papal conclave, he was one of the cardinals considered papabile, something unusual for an Eastern Catholic. Also at that conclave, Cardinal Huzar was the first Major-Archbishop from the Ukrainian Greek Catholic Church ever to participate in a papal conclave as cardinal-elector. (Note: Since the Union of Brest in 1595, the Ukrainian Greek Catholic Church has had five archbishops and major-archbishops who were made cardinals including Cardinal Huzar. Two of them, Mykhajlo Levitsky and Sylvester Sembratovych retained their title for such a short period of time that did not have the opportunity to participate in a conclave. Two others, Josyf Slipyj and Myroslav Ivan Lubachivsky turned 80 and became ineligible to participate in a conclave under the terms of Pope Paul VI's 1971 motu propio Ingravescentem aetatem, a rule subsequently confirmed in the Apostolic Constitutions Romano Pontifici Eligendo (1975) and Universi Dominici Gregis (1996). Slipyj was 86 during the two conclaves of 1978 and thus did not take part and Lubachivsky was 86 at the time of his death in 2000 and so would not have been eligible to participate in the conclave of 2005 had he still lived.)

Huzar was one of about a dozen like-minded European prelates who met annually from 1995 to 2006 in St. Gallen, Switzerland, to discuss reforms with respect to the appointment of bishops, collegiality, bishops' conferences, the primacy of the papacy and sexual morality; they differed among themselves, but shared the view that Cardinal Joseph Ratzinger was not the sort of candidate they hoped to see elected at the next conclave.

The major archiepiscopal see of Lviv was moved on 21 August 2005, to the city of Kyiv, the capital of Ukraine. He was acclaimed by his followers as Patriarch of Kyiv-Galicia, a title not recognised by the Holy See.

In October 2007, Huzar received an honorary doctorate from the Catholic University of America in conjunction with the 100th anniversary of the first assigning of a bishop of the UGCC to the United States.

In February 2008, a celebratory liturgy was held in the Basilica of Santa Sophia in Rome on the occasion of the 75th birthday and 50th anniversary of priesthood of Cardinal Huzar. The Head of the UGCC was greeted by Pope Benedict XVI, whose address was read by the secretary of Cardinal Leonardo Sandri, Monsignor Maurizio Malvestiti.

In 2008 Viktor Yushchenko signed a decree to decorate Cardinal Huzar with the Order of Prince Yaroslav the Wise (the 3rd class). He was honoured with the highest state award "for his outstanding personal contribution in spiritual revival of the Ukrainian nation, longstanding church work, and to mark his 75th birthday".

With failing eyesight due to poorly treated eye disease forcing him to perform the church's intricate liturgical rites from memory, his early resignation was accepted on 10 February 2011 although normally the major archbishop serves for life. Cardinal Huzar's resignation triggered a meeting of the Synod of the Ukrainian church, comprising its global body of bishops, to elect a new major archbishop, which must begin within a month. In the interim, Ihor Vozniak, C.SS.R., Archeparch of Lviv, served as administrator. The last time a Ukrainian Major Archbishop left office while living was in 1882. The new Major Archbishop, Sviatoslav Shevchuk, was elected by the Ukrainian Synod on 23 March and confirmed by Pope Benedict XVI on 25 March 2011.

On 26 February 2013, 2 days before the announced resignation of Pope Benedict XVI, Cardinal Huzar turned 80 and lost his right to participate in a conclave.

He died on 31 May 2017 at the age of 84.

== Bibliography ==
- Любомир Гузар: Спогади ISBN 9786178374099
- Antoine Arjakovsky, Conversations With Lubomyr Cardinal Husar: Towards a Post-Confessional Christianity (Lviv, 2007)

== Sources and references ==
Catholic Church titles
New title	Archepiscopal Exarch of Kyiv-Vyshhorod; 2 April 1996–14 October 1996	Succeeded by Mykhaylo Koltun
Preceded by Myroslav Ivan Lubachivsky	Major Archbishop of Lviv; 25 January 2001–6 December 2004	Succeeded by Ihor Vozniak as Archbishop of Lviv
New title	Archbishop of Kyiv; 6 December 2004–10 February 2011	Succeeded by Sviatoslav Shevchuk
New title	Major Archbishop of Kyiv-Galicia; 21 August 2005–10 February 2011	Succeeded by Sviatoslav Shevchuk
Preceded by Myroslav Ivan Lubachivsky	Cardinal Priest of Santa Sofia a Via Boccea; 21 February 2001 – 31 May 2017	Succeeded by Mykola Bychok
