= Ukrainian Catholic Archeparchy of Lviv =

Archeparchy of the Ukrainian Greek Catholic Church

Coordinates: 49.8667°N 24.0833°E

Archeparchy of Lviv Archieparchia Leopolitana Ucrainorum
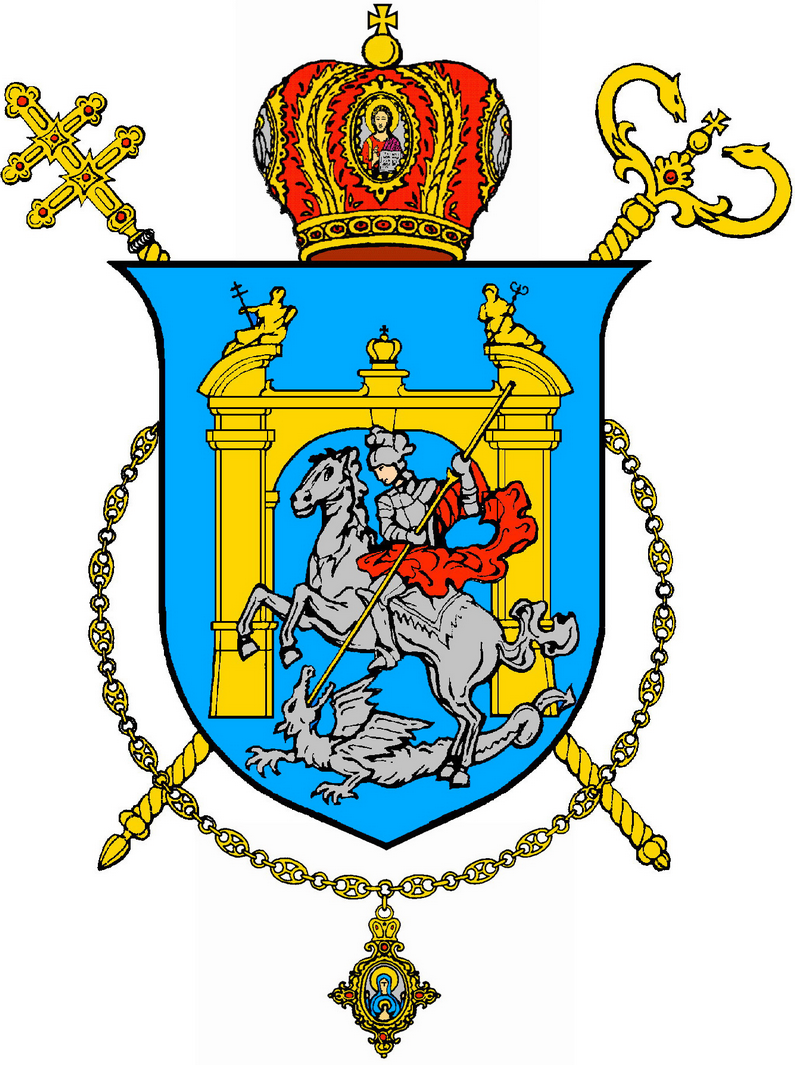
- Coat of arms

Location
- Headquarters: Lviv, Ukraine

Information
- Sui iuris church: Ukrainian Greek Catholic
- Rite: Byzantine Rite
- Cathedral: St. George's Cathedral, Lviv
- Patron saint: Saint George
- Language: Church Slavonic, Ukrainian

Current leadership
- Pope: Leo XIV
- Major Archbishop: Sviatoslav Shevchuk
- Metropolitan Archbishop: Ihor Vozniak, C.Ss.R.
- Auxiliary Bishops: Volodymyr Hrutsa, C.Ss.R.

Map

Website
- http://ugcc.lviv.ua

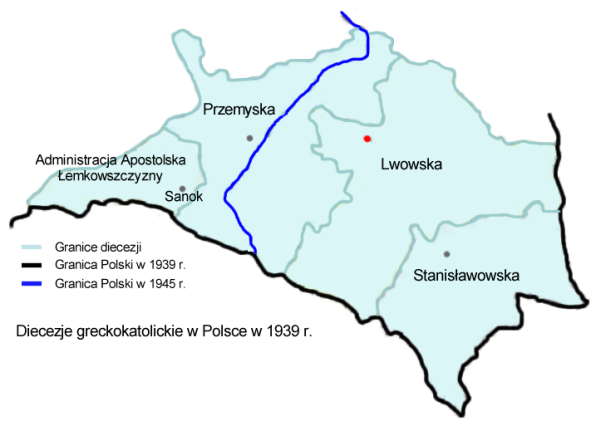
Map of the Ukrainian Catholic Church in the province of Lviv in 1939

The Archeparchy of Lviv is an ecclesiastical territory or ecclesiastical province of the Ukrainian Greek Catholic Church — a particular Eastern Catholic Church, that is located in Ukraine. It was erected in 1807. As a metropolitan see, it has three suffragan sees: Stryi, Sambir-Drohobych, and Sokal–Zhovkva. The incumbent Metropolitan Archbishop is Ihor Vozniak. The cathedral church of the archeparchy is St. George's in the city of Lviv.

== History ==
=== Eparchy of Halych (1156 – 1406) ===
The eparchy was established as the Eastern Orthodox Eparchy of Halych at some time during the mid 12th century as a suffragan of the Metropolis of Kiev and all Rus'. The episcopal seat was located in Halych. In 1303, the eparchy was elevated to metropolitan status as the Metropolis of Halych. It held this status during several periods of the 14th century. After 1401, the title of the vacated province was moved to the Metropolitan of Kyiv.

=== Eparchy of Lviv ===
After long mediation, Sigismund I re-established the eparchy in mid-1539, moving its see to Lviv. The eparchy at first did not recognize the Union of Brest of 1596. It joined the Union in 1700 as part of the Metropolis of Kiev, Galicia and all Ruthenia.

=== Metropolis of Galicia ===
Following the Partitions of the Polish-Lithuanian Commonwealth at the end of the 18th century, most lands fell under Russian rule. In the remaining lands ruled by the Austrian Empire, the "Metropolis of Galicia" (or Halych) was re-established as an archeparchy in 1807 in the Habsburg-ruled Kingdom of Galicia and Lodomeria. After the Second World War, in 1946 the archeparchy, together with the entire Ukrainian Church, was forcefully subjected under the Russian Orthodox Church. However, it continued to operate in secret in its canonical territory. In 1959, the archeparchy was elevated to the rank of "Major Archeparchy" by Pope John XXIII.

After the collapse of the Iron Curtain in 1989, the Church began to restore canonical regularity. On 19 August 1990 Archbishop Volodymyr (Sternyuk) served the first Hierarchical Divine Liturgy in the return to the church St. George's Cathedral, Lviv. On 30 March 1991, the Major Archbishop of Lviv, Cardinal Myroslav Lyubachivskyi, returned from Rome to his major archiepiscopal see in Lviv.

In 1992 the church synod adopted decision to create more eparchies out of the archeparchy of Lviv and on 12 July 1993 it was approved by the Pope. There were established eparchy of Zboriv, eparchy of Sambir and Drohobych, and eparchy of Ternopil. In 2000 there were created eparchy of Stryi and eparchy of Sokal. In 2004 new Major Archbishop of Lviv Lubomyr Husar moved his see to Kiev, becoming Major Archbishop of Kyiv-Halych, leaving the archeparchy of Lviv to Archbishop Ihor Vozniak.

== Current status ==
On 6 December 2004, it was downgraded in status from a "Major Archeparchy" to an "Archeparchy". On 21 November 2011 the church structure was again changed; it became a metropolitan see or ecclesiastical province with three suffragan eparchies:

- Eparchy of Stryi
- Eparchy of Sambir and Drohobych
- Eparchy of Sokal and Zhovkva.

As of 2023 the Metropolitan Archbishop of Lviv is Ihor Vozniak. He was an auxiliary bishop of the "Major Archeparchy of Lviv" during 2001–2004. In December 2004, he became an auxiliary bishop of the newly erected Ukrainian Catholic Major Archeparchy of Kyiv-Halych. In 2005, the Synod elected him as the first archbishop of the new Archeparchy of Lviv.

== Timeline ==
- Established in the 12th century as Orthodox Eparchy of Halych, on territory split off from the Metropolitan of Kiev and all Rus'.
- 1303: Elevated as Metropolis of Halych.
- 1406: Lost a metropolis status, again become as an eparchy with Metropolis of Kiev and all Rus'.
- 1540: a see transferred to Lviv and renamed as Eparchy of Lviv and Halych.
- March 7, 1677: Clandestinely joined Union of Brest with Bishop Yosyf Shumlyansky.
- June 9, 1700: Joined Union of Brest with title Eparchy of Lviv, Halych and Kamianets-Podilskyi.
- February 22, 1807: Elevated as Metropolis with suffragan sees Eparchy of Przemyśl–Sambir and Eparchy of Chełm–Belz.
- January 29, 1830: Lost the Eparchy of Chełm–Belz, that belongs immediately to the Holy See.
- March 26, 1885: Lost territory to establish the Eparchy of Stanislaviv.
- December 23, 1963: Elevated as Major Archeparchy.
- April 20, 1993: Lost territory to establish the Ukrainian Catholic Eparchy of Sambir–Drohobych.
- April 20, 1993: Lost territory to establish the Ukrainian Catholic Eparchy of Ternopil.
- April 20, 1993: Lost territory to establish the Ukrainian Catholic Eparchy of Zboriv. In 2000, this eparchy was disestablished.
- July 21, 2000: Lost territory to establish the Ukrainian Catholic Eparchy of Sokal.
- July 21, 2000: Lost territory to establish the Ukrainian Catholic Eparchy of Stryi.
- December 6, 2004: Elevated as Ukrainian Catholic Archeparchy of Lviv (no longer a Major Archeparchy and Metropolitan).
- November 21, 2011: Become a Metropolitan See with 3 another suffragan sees.

== Figures ==
Prominent figures in the archeparchy have included:

- Vasyl Laba, acting vicar general 1919–1920

== Gallery of suffragan eparchies ==
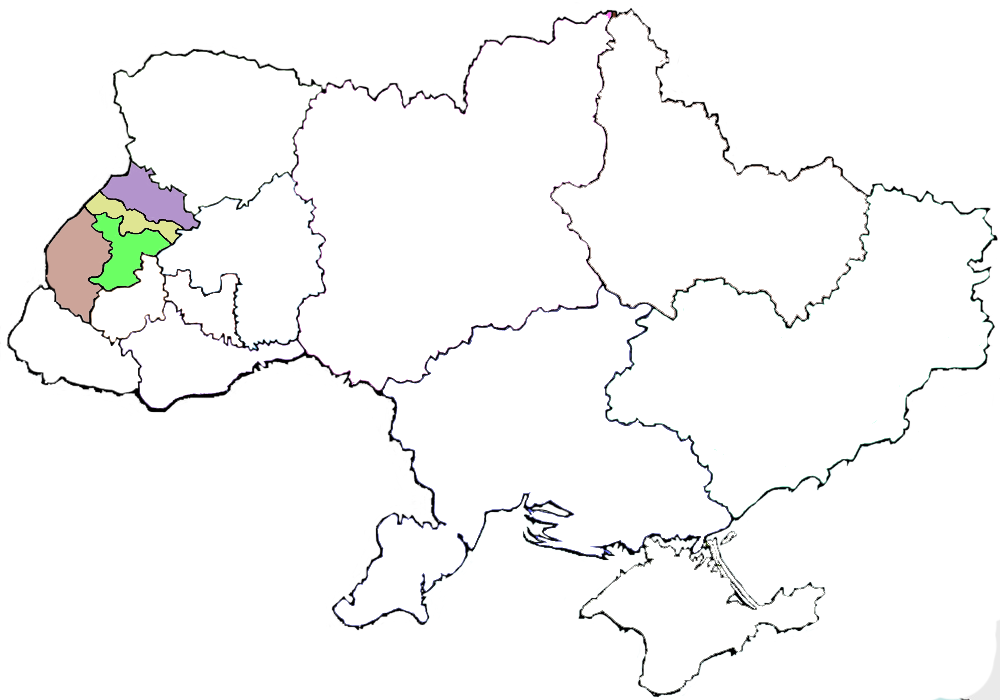
Archeparchy and 3 suffragans

Archeparchy of Lviv

Eparchy of Sokal-Zhovkva

Eparchy of Sambir-Drohobych

Eparchy of Stryi

== See also ==
- Catholic Church in Ukraine
  - Armenian Catholic Archeparchy of Lviv, vacant
  - Roman Catholic Archdiocese of Lviv, Mieczysław Mokrzycki
