= Sviatoslav Shevchuk =

Ukrainian Greek Catholic Church Major Archbishop (born 1970)

His Beatitude Sviatoslav Shevchuk
- Major Archbishop of Kyiv-Galicia; Primate of the Ukrainian Greek Catholic Church
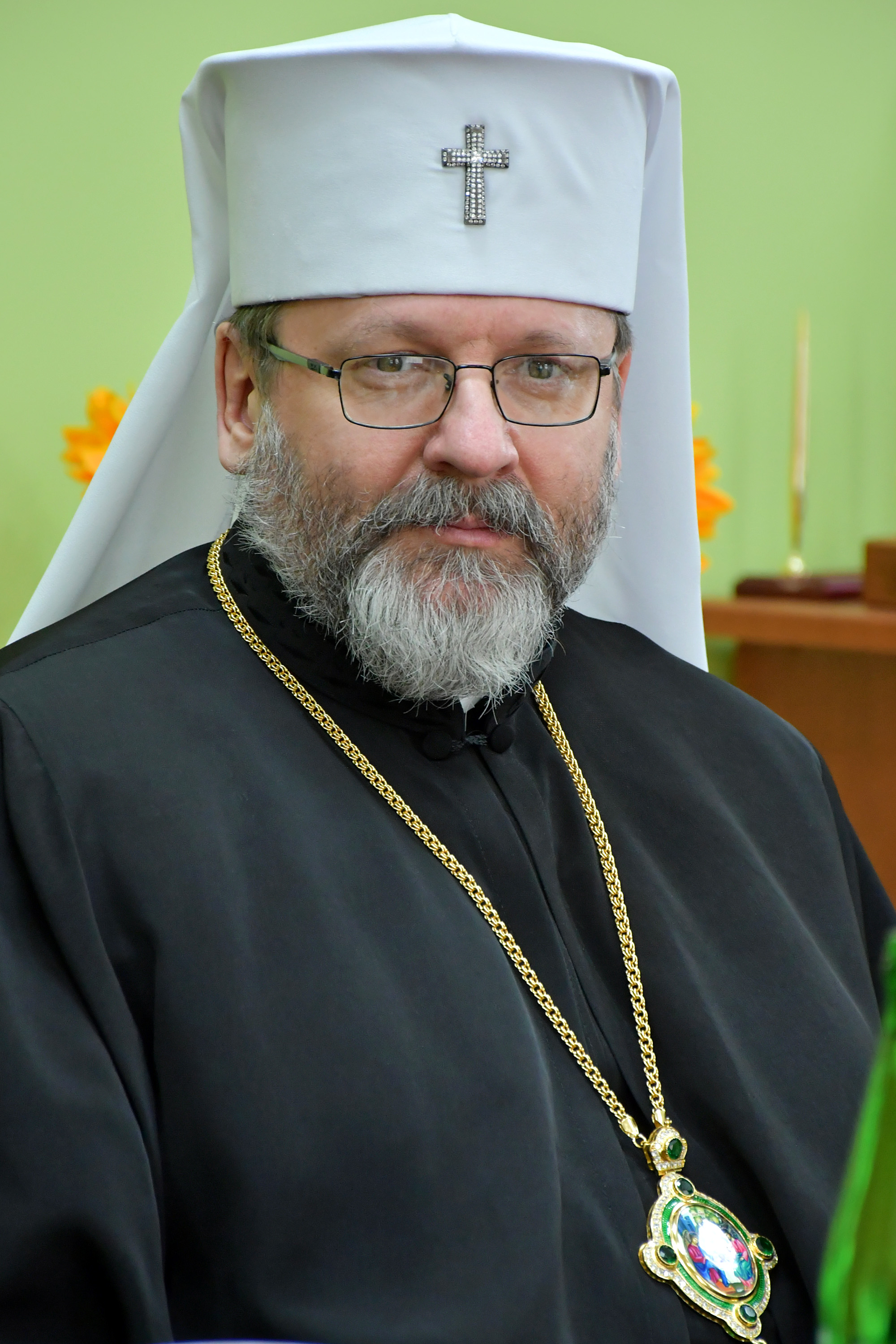
- Shevchuk in 2023
- Church: Ukrainian Greek Catholic Church
- Elected: 23 March 2011
- Installed: 27 March 2011
- Predecessor: Lubomyr Husar
- Other posts: Metropolitan of Kyiv; President of Synod of the Ukrainian Catholic Church; Grand Chancellor of Ukrainian Catholic University; Member of the Dicastery for the Eastern Churches; Member of the Dicastery for Promoting Christian Unity

Orders
- Ordination: 26 June 1994 by Myroslav Lubachivsky
- Consecration: 7 April 2009 by Ihor Vozniak

Personal details
- Born: 5 May 1970 (age 56) Stryi, Lviv Oblast, Ukrainian SSR, Soviet Union
- Denomination: Catholic Church
- Motto: Church Slavonic: Гдⷭ҇ь просвѣще́нїє моє́ и҆ сп҃си́тель мо́й The LORD is my light and my salvation
- Coat of arms: Sviatoslav Shevchuk's coat of arms

Ordination history
History
Diaconal ordination
- Ordained by: Philemon Kurchaba
Priestly ordination
- Ordained by: Ivan Cardinal Lubachivsky
Episcopal consecration
- Principal consecrator: Ihor Voznyak
- Co-consecrators: Miguel Mykycej and Julian Voronovsky
Episcopal succession
Bishops consecrated by Sviatoslav Shevchuk as principal consecrator
- Dmytro Hryhorak: 18 September 2011
- Borys Andrij Gudziak: 26 August 2012
- Eugeniusz Mirosław Popowicz: 21 December 2013
- Mykhaylo Bubniy: 7 April 2014
- Vasyl Volodymyr Tuchapets: 21 May 2014
- Bohdan Manyshyn: 24 May 2014
- Yosafat Moschych: 3 August 2014
- Hryhoriy Komar: 22 August 2014
- Bohdan John Danylo: 4 November 2014
- Teodor Martynyuk: 22 May 2015
- Volodymyr Hrutsa: 7 April 2016
- Andriy Rabiy: 3 September 2017
- Petro Loza: 12 July 2018
- Ivan Kulyk: 1 December 2019
- Stepan Sus: 12 January 2020
- Mykola Bychok: 7 June 2020
- Arkadiusz Trochanowski: 23 January 2021
- Michael Smolinski: 20 January 2024

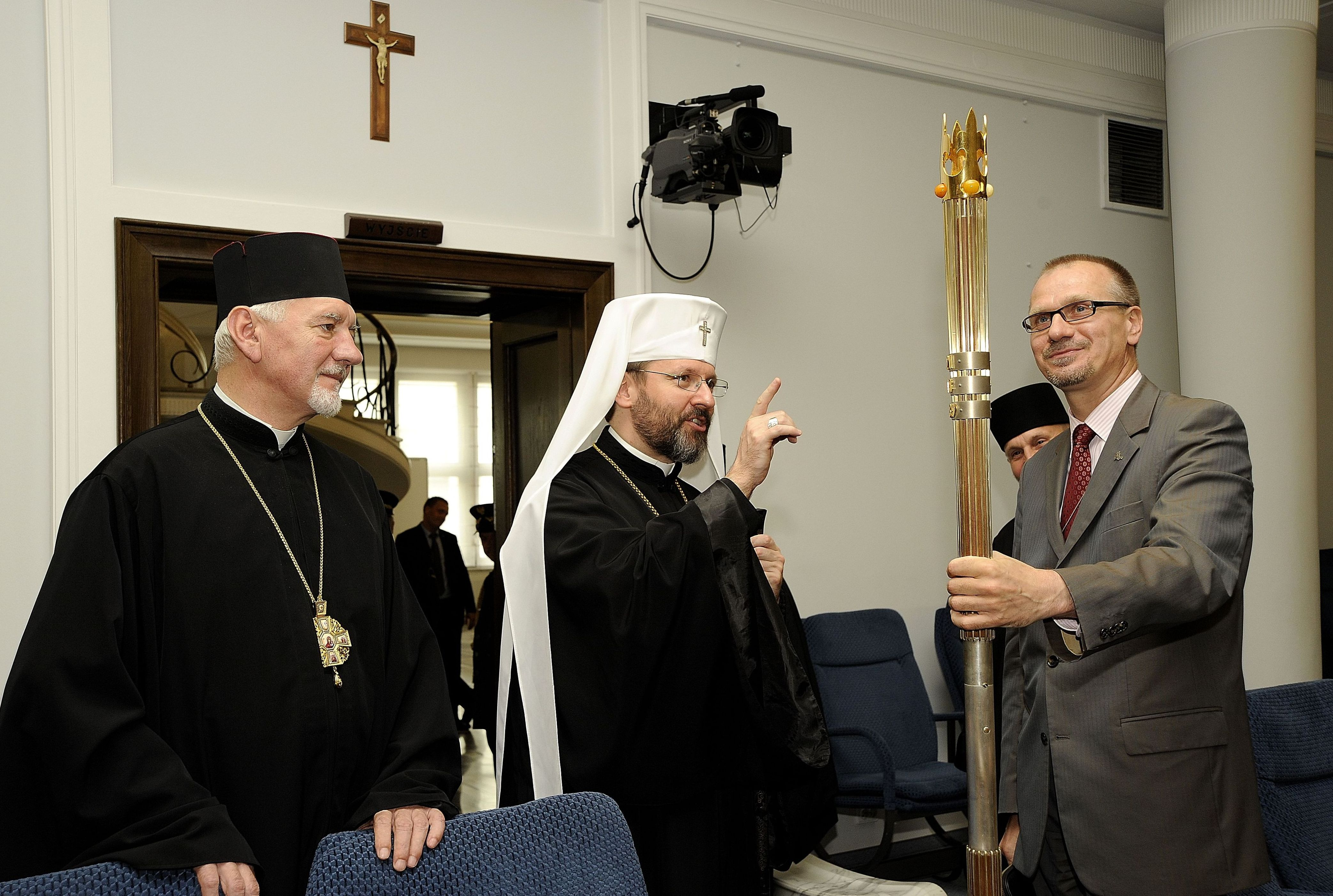
Shevchuk in the Polish Senate

Sviatoslav Yuriyovych Shevchuk (Ukrainian: Святослав Юрійович Шевчук; born 5 May 1970) is a Ukrainian Catholic prelate who has served as the Major Archbishop of Kyiv–Galicia and Primate of the Ukrainian Greek Catholic Church (UGCC) since 25 March 2011.

At the time he was born, the Ukrainian Greek Catholic Church was illegal under the Soviet Union. His parents and grandparents were devout Catholics and active in the Underground Church. He recalled that on a family trip to the Orthodox shrine of Pochaev around 1985, he prayed before an icon of the Theotokos, expressing his desire to become a priest. A couple of years later, while studying medicine in the city of Boryslav, he began to attend a secret seminary in Yaremche, in the foothills of the Carpathian Mountains.

He completed his mandatory military service as a field medic, based in Eastern Ukraine. In the waning days of the Soviet Union, the Ukrainian Greek Catholic Church was legalized again, and Shevchuk was able to complete his seminary studies in a reopened seminary in Lviv.

In August 1991, at the direction of his superiors, he moved to Buenos Aires, Argentina, to study philosophy. He briefly spent time with the Salesian community there. Returning to Ukraine, he was ordained a deacon on 21 May 1994.

== Priesthood ==
Shevchuk was ordained as a priest on 26 June 1994. He is an alumnus of the Pontifical University of St. Thomas Aquinas Angelicum where he earned a Doctorate in theology in 1999. After completing his theological training Shevchuk served as rector of the seminary of Lviv.

From 2002 to 2005 he worked as head of the secretariat of Major Archbishop and Cardinal Lubomyr Husar.

== Episcopacy ==
Shevchuk was appointed auxiliary bishop of the Eparchy of Santa María del Patrocinio en Buenos Aires on 14 January 2009 and consecrated by Archbishop Ihor Vozniak on 7 April 2009. On 10 April 2010, he was appointed Apostolic Administrator of the same diocese upon the retirement of Bishop Miguel Mykycej.

== Major archepiscopacy ==
On 23 March 2011, Shevchuk was elected Major Archbishop of the Ukrainian Greek Catholic Church to replace Lubomyr Husar, who had retired for health reasons. Pope Benedict XVI confirmed his selection on 25 March 2011.

=== Enthronement ===
Shevchuk was enthroned as Major Archbishop on 27 March 2011 in the UGCC's new mother church, the Cathedral of the Resurrection of Christ in Kyiv, which was still under construction at the time. He was the first primate to be enthroned in Kyiv in 400 years. (Note: Most previous Major Archbishops had been installed in Lviv. The original Metropolitan Archdiocese of Kyiv-Galicia was suppressed in 1838 and Lviv served as the primatial see of the UGCC from 1808 until 2005, when it was transferred back to Kyiv.)

Representatives of all three main branches of Ukrainian Eastern Orthodoxy were present for his enthronement, including Metropolitan Mefodiy (UOAC), Metropolitan Volodymyr (UOC-MP), and Bishop Yevstratiy (UOC-KP). (Note: At the time Yevstratiy was an auxiliary bishop of Kyiv for the UOC-KP (and thus an assistant to Patriarch Filaret of Kyiv). He has since become the UOC-KP Archbishop of Chernihiv.)

=== Visits ===
On 31 May 2012, Sviatoslav held his first pastoral visit to Canada. He visited Edmonton after being met by Eparch David Motiuk and other clergy upon his arrival in Calgary. He attended events at St. Josaphat Cathedral and St. George Parish. On 2 June, the head of the UGCC celebrated the 100th anniversary of the establishment of the Parish of the Assumption of the Holy Mother of God in Calgary. He again returned to Canada later in 2012, and on Sunday, 9 September, after the participants took an oath the previous day, Shevchuk celebrated the Divine Liturgy to open a worldwide Ukrainian Catholic Synod of Bishops at Saints Volodymyr and Olha Cathedral in Winnipeg, Manitoba, Canada.

In May 2014, he again visited Canada to mark the arrival of the Sheptytsky Institute within the University of St. Michael's College at the University of Toronto.

Shevchuk visited England in 2017, celebrating the Divine Liturgy at Westminster Cathedral on 28 October.

=== 2022 Russian invasion ===
In early February 2022, Shevchuk said during a conference with Aid to the Church in Need that growing tension was not so much about Ukraine, as the result of a conflict "between Russia and the Western world, particularly the US" and that "The Ukrainian crisis is not just a problem for Ukrainians." Identifying a growing "true idolatry of violence", Shevchuk urged peaceful dialogue over military action.

During the February 2022 Russian invasion of Ukraine, Shevchuk spoke in opposition to the invasion and warned that the fighting could result in Ukraine devolving into "a death camp." Pope Francis promised Shevchuk "I will do everything I can" and praised the decision to open the basement of Resurrection Cathedral in Kyiv as a bomb shelter. Shevchuk appealed to the Russians to not target churches following intelligence reports suggesting that a military strike was planned against the Saint Sophia Cathedral in Kyiv.

In March, Shevchuk spoke to the World Council of Churches and thanked them for submitting a letter to the Patriarch of the Russian Orthodox Church. Shevchuk asserted that "war is always a failure for humanity. War is always a moment of shame, a moment in which man’s dignity is humiliated. When we strive for peace, everything is possible. When war breaks out, we can lose everything", adding "In Ukraine, today, we are seeing great contempt for human dignity. With war, man loses his humanity, especially he who starts war, he who starts war diminishes himself in his humanity. He who kills his neighbour, before all else, destroys the humanity within himself, destroys his own dignity".

Shevchuk has continued to speak frequently about the war, both through his frequent video addresses to the faithful, and in statements to international media. In December 2023 he told Aid to the Church in Need (ACN) that "Ukrainians are feeling very, very tired. People are exhausted, because there is no sign that the conflict is coming to an end", and explained that the UGCC is investing in trauma treatment, since "the population is terribly traumatised by the war, and the key question is how we are going to deal with this trauma. The future of the country is tied to this issue. Around 80% of the population have been affected by this war, some are physically injured, but above all they are wounded in their souls. And then we have psychological trauma, that I can witness to first-hand."

In 2026 the Major Archbishop claimed that statistics in Ukraine showed that though the number of Orthodox Christians had dropped from 70% to 52% during the course of the war, the number of Catholics had risen from 8% to 12%. In an interview with ACN he said that pastoral work during the war was painful. "This is the work we all share, every priest in every parish. We are in mourning. It is painful to preside over countless funerals every day; to bury young people and children, it takes a deep toll on you. Each one of the bishops carries within them the pain of their own people, which we have to share."

== Views ==
=== On the patriarchal title ===
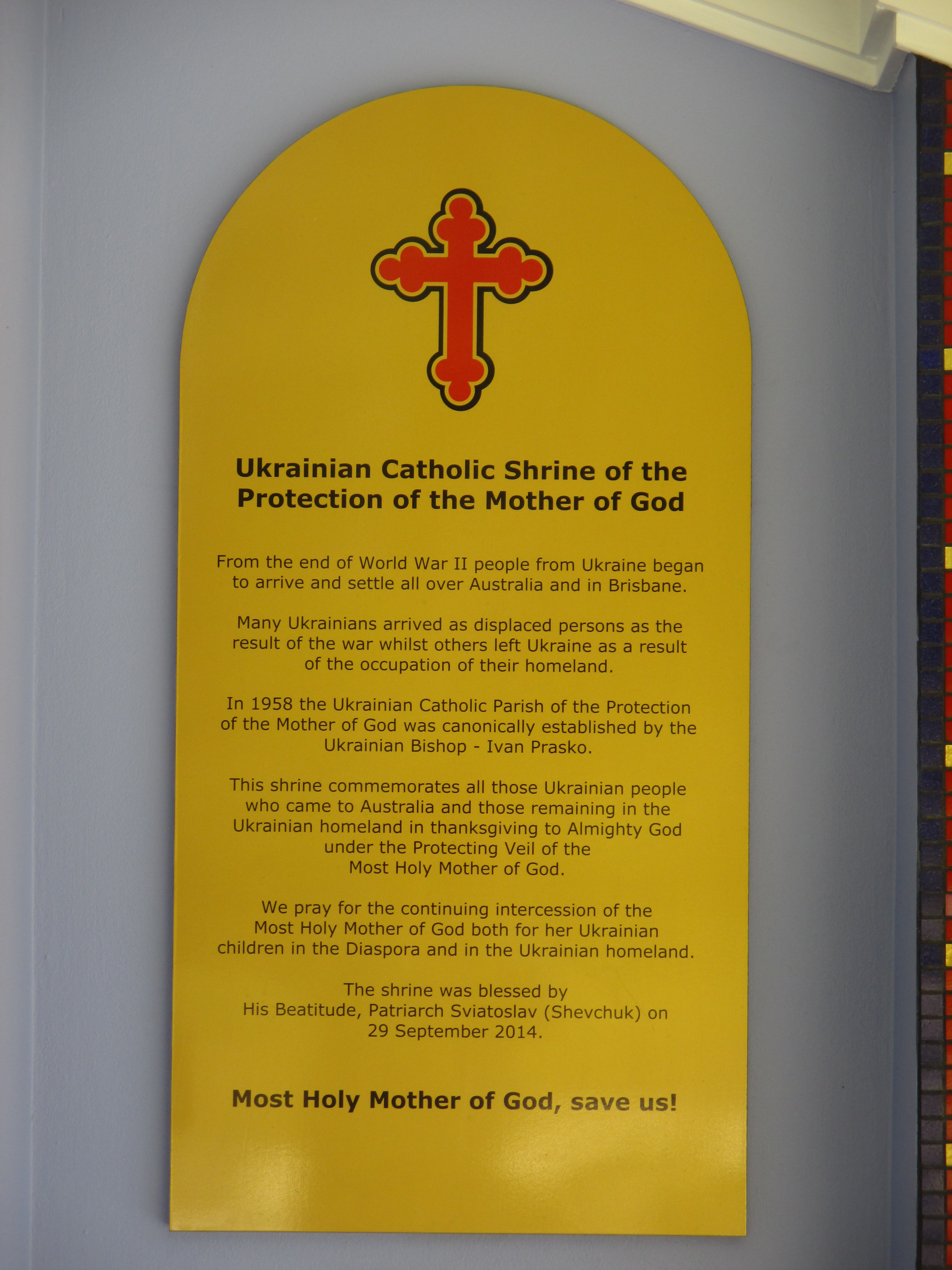
Plaque displaying the title of "Patriarch" in reference to Sviatoslav as used by some Ukrainian Greek Catholics.

On 29 March 2011, Shevchuk said "I'm departing with my bishops and all of the metropolitans of our church to Rome, because it's our duty to make a courtesy visit to the Holy Father" (i.e., the Pope), he said at a press conference in Kyiv. The UGCC leader said that the UGCC Synod of Bishops had prepared a number of proposals for the Pope. "We're really going to tell of how our church is developing and that each developing church [becomes] a patriarchate, because a patriarchate is a period in the completion of the development of a church," he said.

Cardinal Slipyj in the 1960s already petitioned for the patriarchal title. Instead, Pope Paul VI responded by creating the station of "major archbishop", which grants nearly all the powers and capacities of a patriarch at the head of a self-governing church in full communion with Rome, just without the title itself. On 12 June 2012 Shevchuk was appointed a member of the Pontifical Council for Promoting Christian Unity.

=== On his own election ===
In April 2011, Shevchuk said while visiting Rome to meet Pope Benedict XVI, that he believes he was elected "despite my age". Ukrainian bishops from around the world, who met in a synod in late March to elect a new Major Archbishop for their church, were looking for a leader who could "unite the church in Ukraine and outside Ukraine", who could "promote the unity of Christians in Ukraine and establish some sort of dialogue with the new Ukrainian government. ...The No. 1 priority for each head of a church is evangelization, preaching the Gospel of Jesus Christ in today's world. ...Of course, our church is growing, is developing its structures, ... but we are conscious that the decision about the patriarchate belongs to the Holy Father and we would never press him. We respect his freedom." Shevchuk said his age is not really so shocking when one considers that the average age of his priests is about 35. "In our tradition, we do have a married clergy, but a married clergy is not the main reason we have so many young priests", he added.

On 22 June 2011 Shevchuk was appointed a member of the Congregation for the Oriental Churches to a five-year term.

=== On meeting with the Russian Orthodox Patriarch ===
When asked in April 2011 whether he would wish to meet the Russian Orthodox Patriarch Kirill, Shevchuk said that "I would like very much to visit him and hold a personal meeting with him. I am convinced that in peacefully and openly communicating with each other, we can relieve any tension ... I think that today, we should heal the wounds rather than irritate and deepen them. One can heal the wounds of our memory only with mutual forgiveness. Therefore, as for any of our brethren or neighbors who wounded us or were wounded by us, the best way to communicate is to be open in a brotherly dialogue, be open to the purification of our memory, to ask for forgiveness and to forgive."

=== Fiducia Supplicans ===
In December 2023 Shevchuk stated that Fiducia Supplicans declared explicitly that the document does not apply outside the Latin Church.

== Footnotes ==
Catholic Church titles
Preceded by Liubomyr Huzar	Major Archbishop of Kyiv-Galicia; 25 March 2011–present	Incumbent
