= Ukrainian Catholic Eparchy of Zboriv =

Former Ukrainian Catholic Eparchy in Ukraine (1993-2000)

Coordinates: 49.5667°N 25.6000°E

Eparchy of Zboriv Eparchia Zborovensis Ucrainorum Українська Греко-Католицька Зборівська Єпархія

Location
- Territory: some Raions of Lviv Oblast and Ternopil Oblast
- Ecclesiastical province: Archeparchy of Lviv
- Headquarters: Brody, Lviv Oblast, Ukraine
- Population: 375,000 (in 1999)

Information
- Sui iuris church: Ukrainian Greek Catholic
- Rite: Byzantine
- Established: 20 April 1993
- Dissolved: 21 July 2000
- Cathedral: Ukrainian Catholic Cathedral in Brody

Leadership
- Bishop: Mykhaylo Koltun, C.Ss.R. (last eparchial bishop).

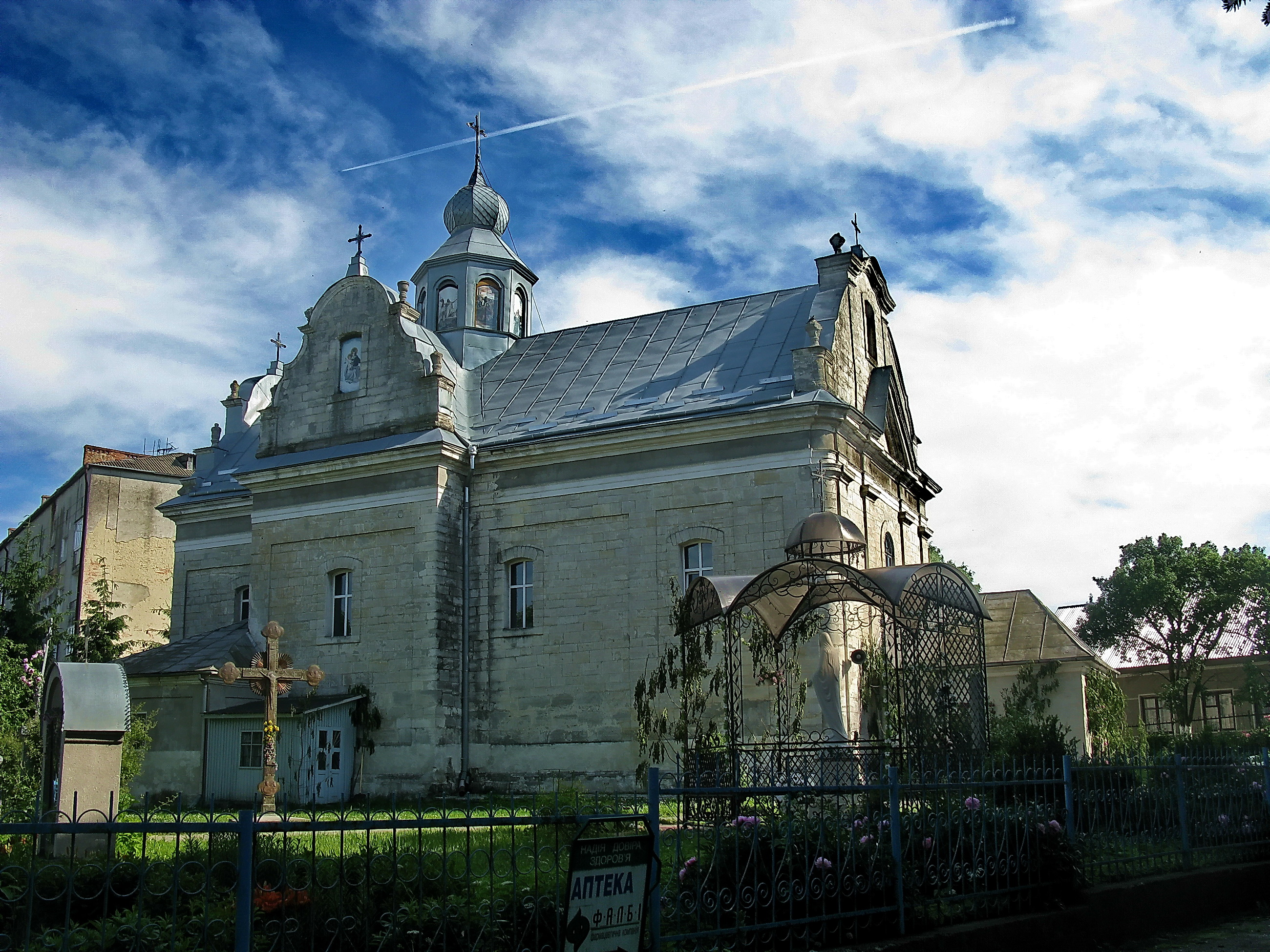

The Eparchy of Zboriv was an eparchy of the Ukrainian Greek Catholic Church, in the ecclesiastical province of Lviv. It was established in 1993 and disestablished in 2000.

== History ==
- 20 April 1993: Established on territory split off from the Ukrainian Catholic Archeparchy of Lviv.
- 21 July 2000: Suppressed and divided between the Ukrainian Catholic Archeparchy of Ternopil – Zboriv and newly established Ukrainian Catholic Eparchy of Sokal.

== Eparchial bishops ==
The following is a list of the bishops of Zboriv and their terms of service:

- (20 Apr 1993 – 13 Nov 1996) Mykhaylo Koltun, C.Ss.R.
- (13 Nov 1996 – 07 Nov 1997) Mykhaylo Koltun, C.Ss.R., titular bishop of Casae in Pamphylia, Archiepiscopal Administrator
- (07 Nov 1997 – 21 Jul 2000) Mykhaylo Koltun, C.Ss.R.
