= Ihor Vozniak =

Ukrainian Greek Catholic archbishop

Ihor Vozniak CSsR
- Ukrainian Catholic Archeparch of Lviv
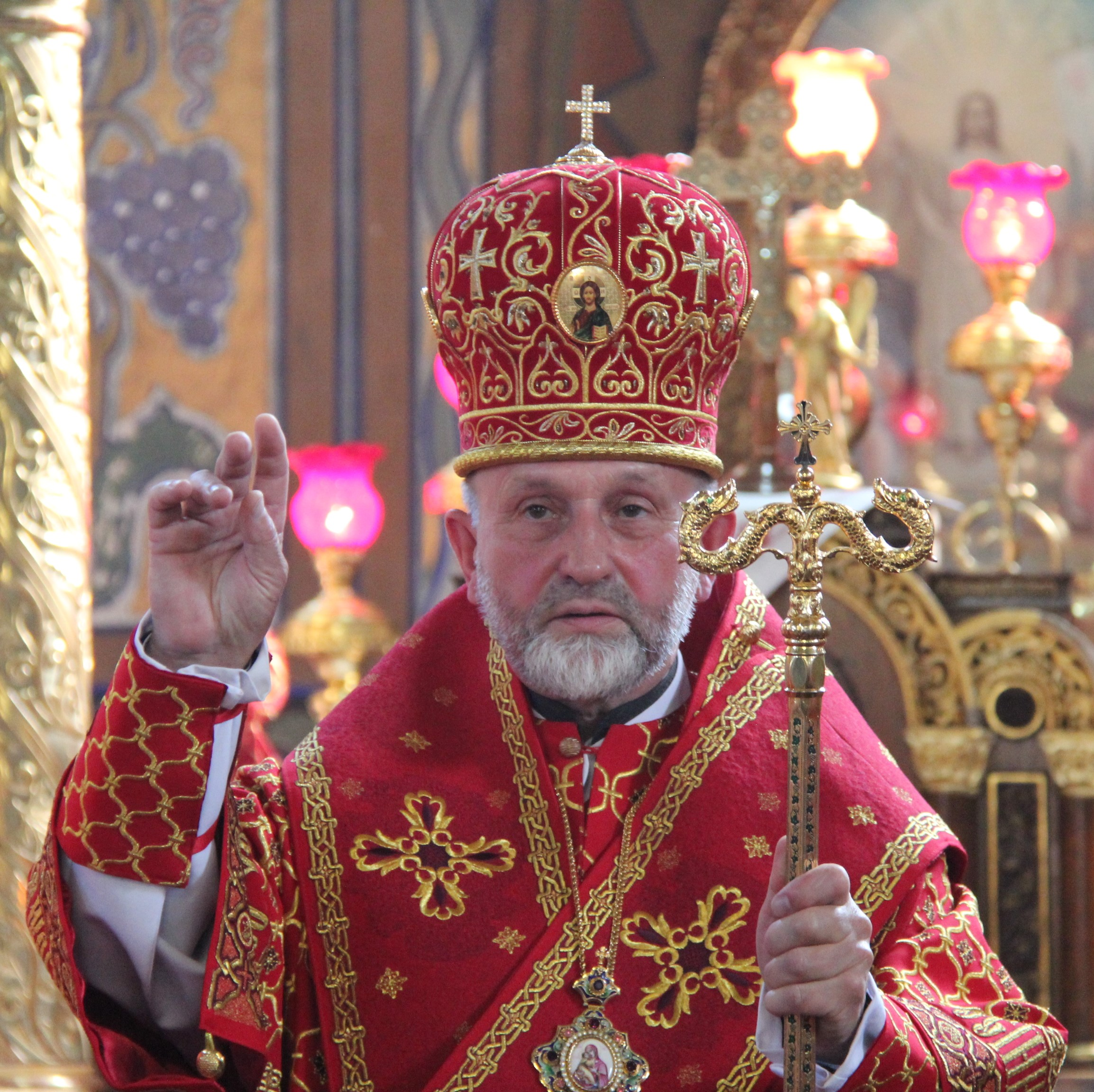
- Church: Ukrainian Greek Catholic Church
- Elected: 10 November 2005
- Predecessor: Lubomyr Husar

Orders
- Ordination: 23 November 1980 (Priest) by Volodymyr Sterniuk
- Consecration: 17 February 2002 (Bishop) by Lubomyr Husar

Personal details
- Born: 3 August 1951 (age 75) Lypytsi, Ukraine, Soviet Union
- Coat of arms

Ihor Vozniak CSsR (born 3 August 1951) is the Archbishop of Lviv since 2005, succeeding Liubomyr Huzar.

== Life ==
Vozniak was born on 3 August 1951 in Lypytsi, in Mykolaiv Raion, Lviv Oblast, in the Ukrainian SSR of the Soviet Union (in present-day Ukraine).

He entered the Congregation of the Most Holy Redeemer in 1973 and was secretly ordained a priest in Vinnytsia on 23 November 1980. He served in the cathedral of Ternopil from 1989.

On 11 January 2002, he was appointed Auxiliary Bishop of Lviv, Ukraine and Titular Bishop of Nisa in Lycia. On 17 February 2002, he was consecrated by Cardinal Liubomyr Huzar. When the Major Archeparchy of the Ukrainian Greek Catholic Church returned from the city of Lviv to the Ukrainian capital of Kyiv in 2004, Major archbishop Husar translated to the new see. On 10 November 2005, Ihor Vozniak was elected Archbishop of Lviv.

He served as the interim administrator of the major archepiscopal see of Kyiv after the resignation of Cardinal Husar until the election of Sviatoslav Shevchuk in February 2011.
