= Andriy Khimyak =

Ukrainian Greek Catholic bishop

- Titular Bishop of Cuicul, Auxiliary Bishop of Archeparchy of Kyiv
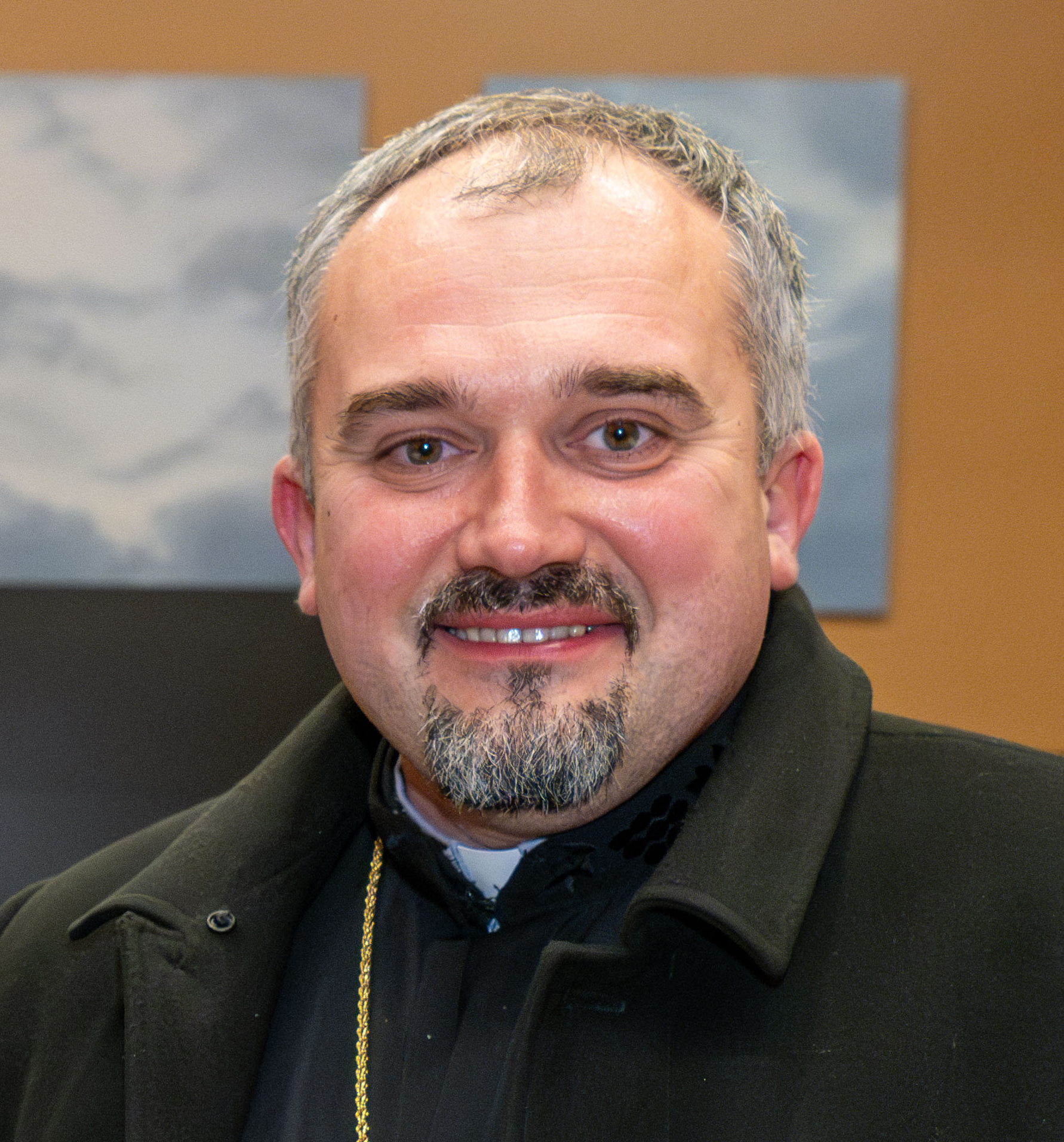
- Church: Ukrainian Greek Catholic Church
- Appointed: 3 November 2022
- Other post: Secretary of the Synod of Bishops of the UGCC (since 2021)
- Previous post: Assistant Secretary of the Synod of Bishops of the UGCC (2009–2021)

Orders
- Ordination: 4 November 2012 (Priest) by Sviatoslav Shevchuk
- Consecration: 19 February 2023 (Bishop) by Sviatoslav Shevchuk

Personal details
- Born: Andriy Mykhaylovych Khimyak; 13 April 1981 (age 45) Lviv, Ukrainian SSR
- Denomination: Ukrainian Greek Catholic
- Motto: Мир Вам (Ukrainian for "Peace be unto you")
- Coat of arms

Bishop Andriy Khimyak (Ukrainian: Андрій Хім'як; born 13 April 1981) is a Ukrainian Greek Catholic hierarch as Titular Bishop of Cuicul and Auxiliary Bishop of the Archeparchy of Kyiv since 3 November 2022.

== Early life and formation ==
Bishop Khimyak was born in a Christian family of Mykhaylo and Halyna Khimyak with two children as a younger child in Lviv. After graduation from the school education in Lviv school #44 (1988–1998), he joined the Theological Seminary in Lviv, simultaneously studying in the Ukrainian Catholic University from 1998 until 2005. He was ordained as a deacon on 9 May 2012 and as a priest on 4 November 2012. Both ordinations were made by Major Archbishop Sviatoslav Shevchuk for the Archeparchy of Kyiv in the Cathedral of the Resurrection of Christ in Kyiv.

== Educational and pastoral career ==
Fr. Khimyak continued his studies in Rome, Italy, where he attended the Pontifical Oriental Institute (2005–2008), receiving a licentiate degree in the liturgical theology. After returning to Ukraine, he served as assistant to the Secretary of the Synod of Bishops of the Ukrainian Greek-Catholic Church (2009–2021) and a lecturer in the Three Saint Hierarchs Major Theological Seminary in Kyiv (2011–2023).

In April 2021 he was appointed as the Secretary of the Synod of Bishops of the Ukrainian Greek-Catholic Church, when the previous Secretary, Bishop Bohdan Dzyurakh was appointed as the Apostolic Exarch of the Ukrainian Catholic Apostolic Exarchate of Germany and Scandinavia.

== Bishop ==
On 3 November 2022, he was confirmed by Pope Francis as an Auxiliary Bishop of the Ukrainian Catholic Archeparchy of Kyiv and appointed as a Titular Bishop of Cuicul. He was consecrated as a bishop by Major Archbishop Sviatoslav Shevchuk and co-consecrators: bishop Bohdan Dzyurakh and bishop Stepan Sus in the Cathedral of the Resurrection of Christ in Kyiv on 19 February 2023.

Catholic Church titles
Preceded by Alexis Aly Tagbino	Titular Bishop of Cuicul; 2022–	Succeeded by Incumbent
Preceded by Bohdan Dzyurakh	Secretary of the Synod of Bishops of the UGCC; 2021–	Succeeded by Incumbent
