= Ukrainian Greek Catholic Church =

Eastern Catholic church

- Українська греко-католицька церква
- Abbreviation: UGCC
- Type: Particular church (sui iuris)
- Classification: Christian, Catholic
- Orientation: Eastern Catholic
- Theology: Catholic Theology
- Polity: Episcopal
- Governance: Synod of the Ukrainian Catholic Church
- Pope: Leo XIV
- Major Archbishop: Sviatoslav Shevchuk
- Parishes: c. 3993
- Region: Mainly: Ukraine; Minority: Canada, the United States, Australia, France, the United Kingdom, Germany, Brazil, Poland, Lithuania and Argentina
- Language: Church Slavonic (official); Ukrainian, English, and other regional vernaculars
- Liturgy: Byzantine Rite
- Headquarters: Cathedral of the Resurrection, Kyiv, Ukraine
- Founder: Michael Rohoza (as Ruthenian Uniate Church)
- Origin: 988, establishment of the Metropolitanate of Kyiv; 1596, Union of Brest; Brest, Polish–Lithuanian Commonwealth
- Separated from: Ecumenical Patriarchate of Constantinople (1596, as Ruthenian Uniate Church)
- Separations: Ukrainian Orthodox Greek Catholic Church
- Members: 4.2 million
- Other names: Ukrainian Catholic Church; Ukrainian Greek Church; Uniate Church
- Official website: ugcc.ua

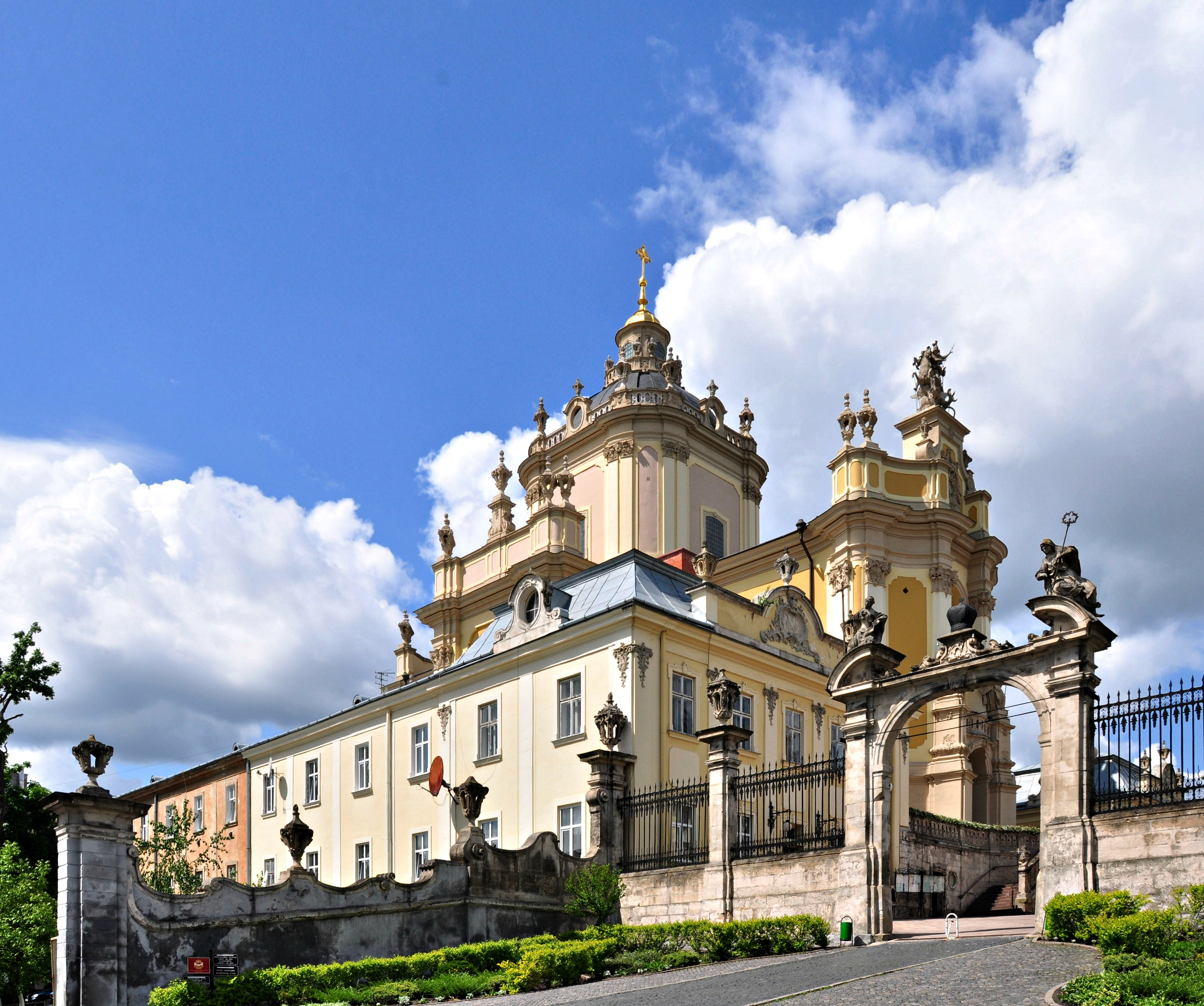
St. George's Cathedral in Lviv.

The Ukrainian Greek Catholic Church (UGCC) (Note: Ukrainian: Українська греко-католицька церква, romanized: Ukrainska hreko-katolytska tserkva; Greek: Ουκρανική Ελληνοκαθολική Εκκλησία, romanized: Oukranikí Ellinokatholikí Ekklisía; Latin: Ecclesia Graeco-Catholica Ucrainae) is a major archiepiscopal sui iuris ("autonomous") Eastern Catholic church that is based in Ukraine. As a particular church of the Catholic Church, it is in full communion with the Holy See. The major archbishop, currently Sviatoslav Shevchuk, presides over the entire Church.

The church regards itself as a successor to the Metropolis of Kiev and all Rus', which was established in 988 following the Christianization of Kievan Rus' by Grand Prince Vladimir the Great. Following the establishment of the metropolis of Kiev, Galicia and all Rus', by the terms of the Union of Brest, the Ruthenian church was transferred from the ecclesiastical jurisdiction of the Ecumenical Patriarchate of Constantinople to the jurisdiction of the Holy See in 1596, thereby forming the Ruthenian Uniate Church. The Union of Brest was a treaty agreed by the Ruthenian Orthodox Church in the Polish–Lithuanian Commonwealth, under the leadership of the metropolitan of Kiev, Galicia and all Rus'—Michael III—on one part, and the Latin Church under the leadership of Pope Clement VIII on the other part.

Following the partitions of Poland, the eparchies of the Ruthenian Uniate Church (Latin: Ecclesia Ruthena unita) were liquidated in the Russian Empire and the Kingdom of Prussia. Only the three eparchies that came under Austrian jurisdiction remained of the Brest Union. In 1963, the church was recognized as Ukrainian through the efforts of Yosyf Slipyi.

In 1963, the ordinary (or hierarch) of the church was granted the title of "Major Archbishop". He currently holds the title of "Major archbishop of Kyiv-Galicia". However, the hierarchs and faithful of the church acclaim their ordinary as "Patriarch" and have requested Papal recognition of this honour.

== Names ==
In its early years, the church was called the Ecclesia (Ruthena) unita in Latin, often anglicized as the Ruthenian Uniate Church, where Ruthenia is the anglicization of Rus', the medieval kingdom that ruled what is now Ukraine, Belarus, and western Russia, and uniate means 'part of a union', in this case the Union of Brest (1595). However, the term Uniate became a term of abuse in writings by Orthodox authors, and fell of out favour among Greek Catholics themselves. The people in this church were referred to by the Catholic hierarchy primarily as Graeci catholici (Greek Catholics) because they used the "Greek" or Byzantine Rite, as well as more specifically Rutheni catholici (Ruthenian Catholics). The leader of the Church was called Metropolita Kioviensis or "Metropolitan of Kiev" and sometimes also "of Galicia and all Rus'" until 1805.

The Austrian Empire later used Griechisch-katolisch (German for 'Greek Catholic') as a catch-all term for Eastern Catholics under its rule until 1918.

The Ruthenian population of Galicia and Bukovyna began to increasingly identify themselves as Ukrainian, emphasizing the connection to Ukrainians in the Russian Empire, in the late 19th and early 20th centuries. The papal statistical yearbook Annuario Pontificio began referring to the church as Ukrainian from 1912. In the wake of the creation of the West Ukrainian People's Republic in 1918, the church was also increasingly referred to as Ukrainian in pastoral letters. During the interwar period, the word Ukrainian was well established in the diasporan parishes. Most documents from the Vatican did not officially change the church's name until 1963.

The first use of various names of the church are listed here.

- Uniate Church (Latin: Ecclesia unita Ukrainian: Унійна Церква, romanized: Uniina Tserkva) — since 1596, at its foundation;
- Ruthenian Uniate Church (Latin: Ecclesia Ruthena unita, Ukrainian: Руська Унійна Церква, romanized: Ruska Uniina Tserkva) — used from the 17th century in official church documents;
- Greek Catholic Church (Latin: Ecclesia Graeco-Catholica, Ukrainian: Греко-Католицька Церква, romanized: Hreko-Katolytska Tserkva) — since 1774, adopted by a decision of Empress Maria Theresa to distinguish it from the Latin Catholic and Armenian Catholic Churches);
- Ukrainian Catholic Church of the Byzantine Rite (Ukrainian: Українська Католицька Церква візантійського обряду, romanized: Ukrainska Katolytska Tserkva vizantiiskoho obriadu) — used since 1912 used in the papal statistical yearbook Annuario Pontificio;
- Ukrainian Catholic Church (Latin: Ecclesia Catholica Ucrainae, Ukrainian: Українська Католицька Церква, romanized: Ukrainska Katolytska Tserkva) —since the early 1960s;
- Kyivan Catholic Church (Ukrainian: Київська Католицька Церква, romanized: Kyivska Katolytska Tserkva) — since 1999, approved by the Synod of Bishops of the UGCC.

== History ==
=== Ruthenian Orthodox Church to the Union of Brest ===
The Ruthenian Greek Catholic Church was created with the Union of Brest in 1595/1596, yet its roots go back to the Christianization of Kievan Rus'. Byzantine missionaries exercised decisive influence in the area. The 9th-century mission of Saints Cyril and Methodius in Great Moravia had particular importance as their work allowed the spread of worship in the Old Church Slavonic language. The Byzantine-Greek influence continued, particularly with the official adoption of Byzantine rites by Prince Vladimir I of Kiev in 988 when the metropolis of Kiev within the Ecumenical Patriarch of Constantinople was established. Later at the time of the Great Schism (c. 1054), the church took sides and remained Orthodox.

Following the devastating Mongol invasions and the sack of Kiev in 1240, Metropolitan Maximos moved to the town of Vladimir-on-Klyazma in 1299. In 1303, at the request of the Ruthenian kings of the Kingdom of Galicia–Volhynia, Patriarch Athanasius I of Constantinople created the separate metropolis of Halych which included the western parishes of the original metropolis of Kiev. The new metropolis did not last for long (inconsistently throughout most of the 14th century), and its new metropolitan, Peter of Moscow, was consecrated as the metropolitan of Kiev, rather than the metropolitan of Halych.

Just before his death, Peter moved his episcopal see from Vladimir to Moscow. During his reign, the Metropolitanate of Lithuania was established in the Grand Duchy of Lithuania, while the metropolis of Halych was also re-established after his death. In 1445, the metropolitan Isidore, with his see in Moscow, joined the Council of Florence and became the papal legate for all Ruthenia and Lithuania. After Isidore suffered prosecution by the local bishops and royalty of the Grand Principality of Moscow, he was exiled from Moscow, while a council of Russian bishops appointed their own metropolitan, Jonah of Moscow, without the consent of the Ecumenical Patriarch of Constantinople, leading to the independence of the Russian Orthodox Church in 1448.

For this reason, Patriarch Gregory III of Constantinople reorganized the Ruthenian Church in the Polish–Lithuanian Commonwealth. Its new primates were styled "Metropolitans of Kiev, Galicia and all Ruthenia". He appointed Gregory II Bulgarian as the new Greek Catholic primate, who rejoined the Ecumenical Patriarch of Constantinople under Dionysius I of Constantinople in 1470.

=== From the Union of Brest to the Partitions of Poland ===
Religions in the Polish–Lithuanian Commonwealth in 1573: Catholic Orthodox Calvinist

Religions in the Polish–Lithuanian Commonwealth in 1750: Latin Catholic Greek Catholic

This situation continued for some time, and in the intervening years what is now western and central Ukraine came under the rule of the Polish–Lithuanian Commonwealth. The Polish king Sigismund III Vasa was heavily influenced by the ideals of the Counter-Reformation and wanted to increase the Catholic presence in Ukraine. While the clergy of the Ruthenian lands were technically ruled from Constantinople, the Ruthenian Orthodox bishops were appointed by the Polish Catholic monarch, often with disastrous results. In the Eparchy of Volodymyr, for example, two different lay noblemen were both appointed as bishop by the Polish king. Both "bishops" hired mercenaries and fought a pitched battle over control of the Eparchy, before the Polish king finally stepped in and appointed one of the two candidates to an adjacent Orthodox See.

Meanwhile, the religious renewal caused by the Counter-Reformation among Latin Catholics in Poland and Lithuania drew the envy of Orthodox clergy. With the encouragement of the Society of Jesus, four bishops of the Ruthenian Church signed the Union of Brest in 1595, broke from the Ecumenical Patriarchate of Constantinople, and reunited with the Catholic Church under the authority of the Holy See, while continuing to say the Byzantine Rite in Old Church Slavonic. The Union of Brest was also motivated by outrage over the insult to the Primacy of the See of Kiev implicit in the recent promotion of the See of Moscow to a patriarchate by Jeremias II of Constantinople. In 1596, the Ruthenian bishops finalized their agreement with the Holy See.

The union was not accepted by all the members of the Ruthenian Orthodox Church in these lands, and marked the creation of Greek Catholic Church and separate eparchies that continued to stay Orthodox among which were Lviv eparchy, Peremyshel eparchy, Mukachevo eparchy and Lutsk eparchy that at first accepted the union but later oscillated back and forth, depending on who was the Bishop.

There was an attempt to resolve the conflict between Orthodox and Greek Catholics by adopting "Articles for Pacification of Ruthenian people" in 1632. Following that, both churches existed legally in the Polish–Lithuanian Commonwealth with Metropolitans of Kyiv, one, Josyf Veliamyn Rutsky, Greek Catholic, and another, Peter Mogila, Orthodox.

Following the Union of Brest, the new Greek Catholic church was widely supported by both the Ukrainian clergy and local Christians. According to Ludvik Nemec, the creation of the Uniate church was a turning point for the development of Ukrainian national awareness – the separation from Russian-dominated Orthodoxy made the Ukrainian population more aware of the linguistic and cultural differences from Russia, and the Ukrainian identity started to sharply develop in the 16th and 17th century. Greek Catholicism became the dominating religion in Ukraine, and "the Ukrainians became almost strangers to the Russians".

At the same time, the Uniates were not treated on a par with Latin Catholics in Poland-Lithuania; Greek Catholics were excluded from the Polish Senate, and bishops were to be supervised by Latin Catholic bishops. The Uniate church was neglected by Polish authorities, causing resentment towards Polish rule as well. As the result of being alienated from both Polish Latin Catholicism and Russian Orthodoxy, the Greek Catholic church in Ukraine had developed its own separate, Ukrainian identity. Greek Catholic bishops of Ukraine such as Josaphat Kuntsevych are considered the precursors of Ukrainian nationalism.

=== Impact of the Partitions of the Commonwealth ===
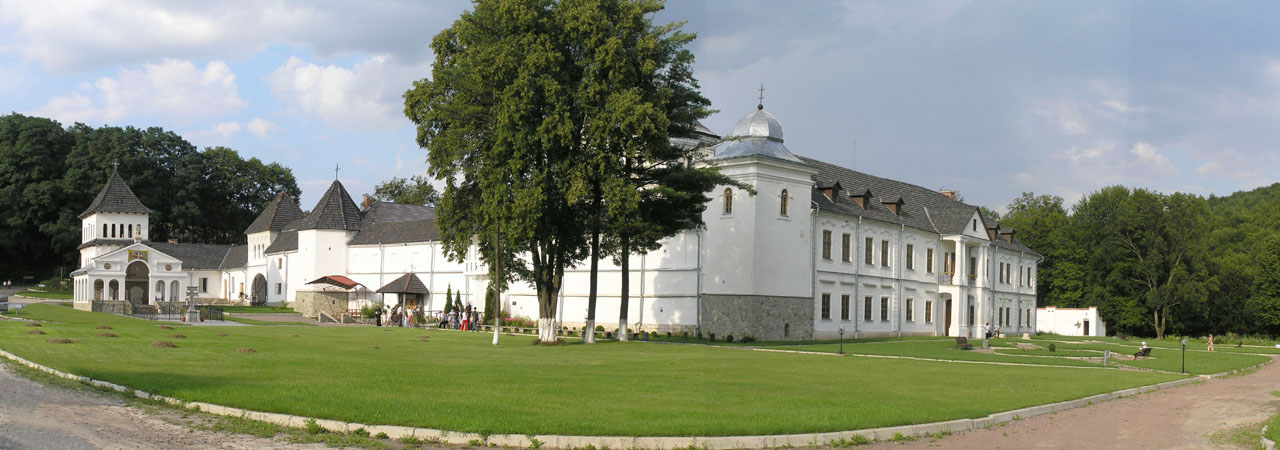
The Univ Lavra was established in 1400 by the ruler Lubart's son Theodore and remains the holiest monastery of the Ukrainian Greek Catholic Church.

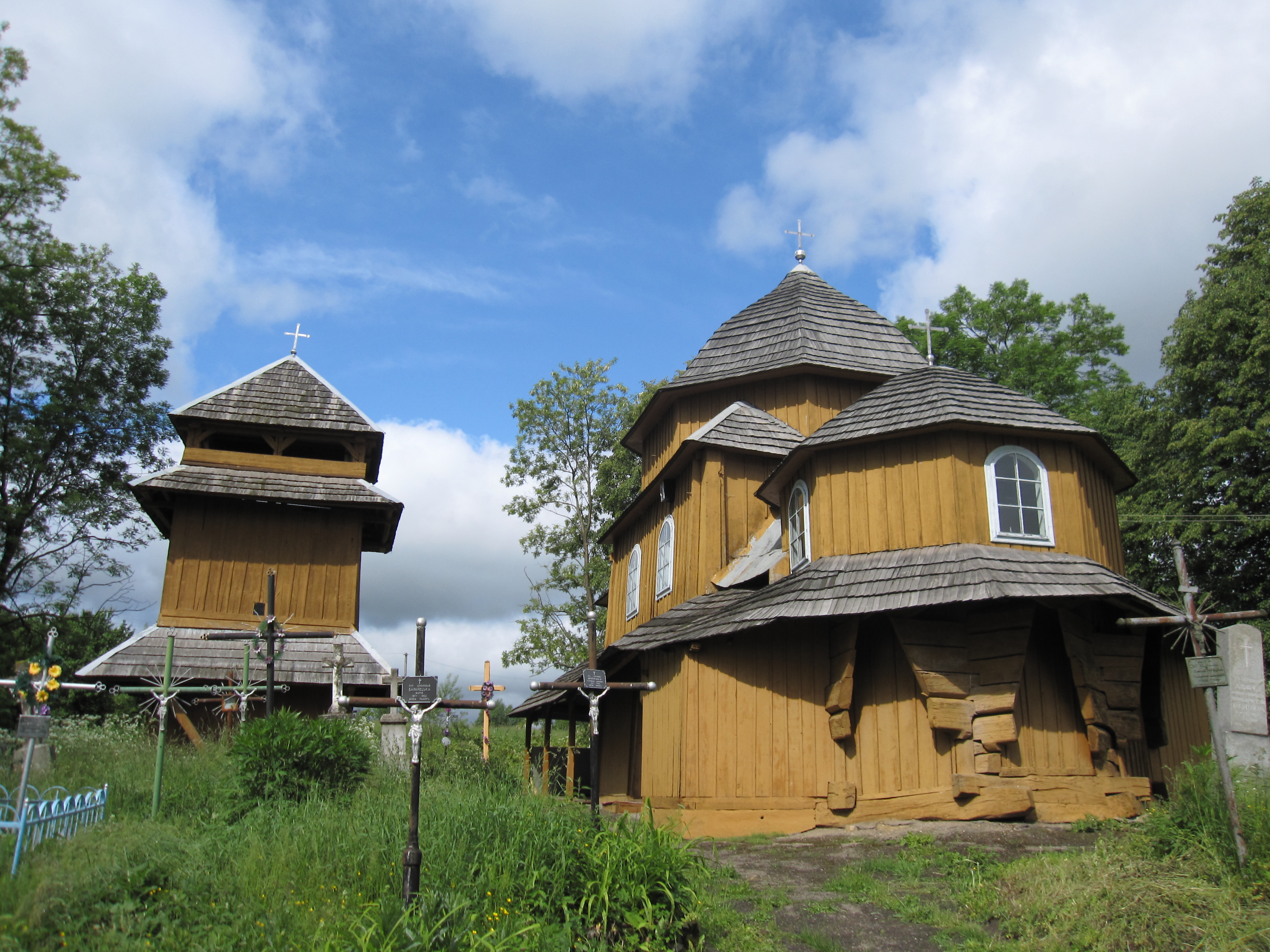
Small wooden church and belfry in the village of Selets, Drohobych Raion from the 17th century, in the typical architectural style of that region

After the partitions of Poland, the original diocesan structure of the Ruthenian Uniate Church was split among the three states in the following way:

To the Russian Empire

- Archeparchy of Polotsk, Metropolitan of all Byzantine Catholics in Russia
- Eparchy of Brest
- Eparchy of Lutsk
- Eparchy of Lithuania

To the Kingdom of Prussia

- Eparchy of Supraśl

To the Habsburg monarchy

- Archeparchy of Lviv, Metropolitan of Galicia
- Eparchy of Chełm
- Eparchy of Przemyśl and Sambir

The Habsburg monarchy established the crown land of the Kingdom of Galicia and Lodomeria and also a territory called West Galicia, which in 1803 was merged with Galicia and Lodomeria. In 1804, the combined entities became a crownland of the Austrian Empire. The Greek Catholic Church was established in 1807 with its metropolitan see based in Lemberg. Its suffragan dioceses included Chelm and Przemyśl. Following the 1809 Treaty of Schönbrunn, the Austrian Empire was forced to cede most of the territory of the former West Galicia to the Duchy of Warsaw. In 1815, the final decision of Congress of Vienna resulted in the cession of West Galicia to the Russian Empire. The diocese of Chelm, which was located in West Galicia, ended up under the Russian jurisdiction.

The Russian emperor Pavel I of Russia restored the Uniate church, which was reorganized with three eparchies suffragan to metropolitan bishop Joasaphat Bulhak. The church was allowed to function without restraint (calling its adherents Basilians). The clergy soon split into pro-Catholic and pro-Russian, however, with the former tending to convert to Latin Catholicism, while the latter group, led by Bishop Iosif Semashko (1798–1868) and firmly rejected by the ruling Greek-Catholic synod remained largely controlled by the pro-Polish clergy with the Russian authorities largely refusing to interfere.

Following the Congress of Vienna, the Russian Empire occupied so-called West Galicia (formerly in Austrian Poland) and, temporarily, Tarnopol district, where a separate metropolitan of Galicia was established between 1809 and 1815. The territory of Kholm eparchy along with Central Polish territories became part of Congress Poland. The situation changed abruptly following Russia's successful suppression of the 1831 Polish uprising, aimed at overthrowing Russian control of the Polish territories. As the uprising was actively supported by the Greek-Catholic church, a crackdown on the Church occurred immediately.

The pro-Latin members of the synod were removed; and the Church began to disintegrate, with its parishes in Volhynia reverting to Orthodoxy, including the 1833 transfer of the famous Pochaiv Lavra. In 1839 the Synod of Polotsk (in modern-day Belarus), under the leadership of Bishop Semashko, dissolved the Greek-Catholic church in the Russian Empire, and all its property was transferred to the Orthodox state church. The 1913 Catholic Encyclopedia says that, in what was then known as 'Little Russia' (now Ukraine), the pressure of the Russian Government "utterly wiped out" Greek Catholicism, and "some 7,000,000 of the Uniats there were compelled, partly by force and partly by deception, to become part of the Greek Orthodox Church".

In the years following and preceding the Partitions, Catherine the Great played a huge rule in forcefully dismantling the Greek Catholic Church in Ukraine. She expressed disdain towards both Greek and Latin Catholicism while praising Protestant denominations, and was determined to reinstate Orthodoxy as the majority religion in Ukraine. As Russian troops entered Polish-controlled Ukraine to suppress the Bar Confederation, Catherine "unleashed an Orthodox missionary crusade against the Uniate parishes of Ukraine", and actively incited violence against Latin Catholics, Uniates, and Jews, resulting in atrocities such as the Massacre of Uman.

Greek Catholic parishes were pressured to convert to Russian Orthodoxy, and priests who resisted were expelled. More than a thousand Ukrainian Uniate parishes were taken over by Orthodox priests. According to Larry Wolff of American Academy of Arts and Sciences, the years of Polish partitions were "years of lawless bullying in Ukraine, which remained in a state of suspended irregularity while Catherine fought her wars and negotiated the partition". Following the failure of Kościuszko Insurrection and the final partition of Poland, the persecution of Ukrainian Greek Catholics intensified, and the church was forbidden from accepting converts from Orthodoxy. Russian authorities harassed and arrested Uniate priests, while Russian Orthodox priests accompanied by Russian soldiers visited Ukrainian villages and intimidated the population into converting to Orthodoxy. Wolff notes that despite harsh persecution and heavy pressure, "the great majority of Uniates held fast to the Union."

Theodosius Rostocki wrote that in response to resistance encountered by Greek Catholics in Ukraine, Russian authorities took over the Uniate churches: "Wherever priests and people, in spite of threats and terrors, remained steadfast, then, even when they [the persecutors] had obtained only a few signatures from the community, they confiscated the church with all its furnishings, took the whole village under their spiritual administration ad drove out the Uniate priests." A 19th-century historian Edward Likowski commented on Catherine's death: "The eternal Judge called her to the justice of His judgment seat so that she might account for the rivers of blood and tears that flowed during her reign from millions of Uniates, solely on account of their religious conviction."

The dissolution of the Greek-Catholic Church in Russia was completed in 1875 with the abolition of the Eparchy of Kholm. By the end of the century, those remaining faithful to this church began emigrating to the U.S., Canada, and Brazil due to persecution by the Orthodox Church and the Russian Empire, e.g. the Pratulin Martyrs. Despite being once the majority religion in Ukraine, the Uniate church was now mostly confined to Eastern Galicia.

Within the lands of the Ukrainian Greek Catholic Church, the largest Eastern Catholic Church, priests' children often became priests and married within their social group, establishing a tightly knit hereditary caste, which numbered approximately 2,000-2,500 by the 19th century. In the absence of a significant culturally and politically active native nobility (although there was considerable overlap, with more than half of the clerical families also being of petty noble origin), and enjoying a virtual monopoly on education and wealth within western Ukrainian society, the clergy came to form that group's native aristocracy. The clergy adopted Austria's role for them as bringers of culture and education to the Ukrainian countryside. Most Ukrainian social and political movements in Austrian-controlled territory emerged or were highly influenced by the clergy themselves or by their children. This influence was so great that western Ukrainians were accused by their Polish rivals of wanting to create a theocracy in western Ukraine.

The territory received by Austria in the partition of Poland included Galicia (modern western Ukraine and southern Poland). Here the Greek-Catholic Ruthenian (Ukrainian) peasantry had been largely under Polish Catholic domination. The Austrians granted equal freedom of worship to the Greek-Catholic Church and removed Polish influence. They also mandated that Uniate seminarians receive a formal higher education (previously, priests had been educated informally by their fathers), and organized institutions in Vienna and Lviv that would serve this function. This led to the appearance, for the first time, of a large, educated class within the Ukrainian population in Galicia. It also engendered a fierce sense of loyalty to the Habsburg dynasty. When Polish rebels briefly took control of Lviv in 1809, they demanded that the head of the Ukrainian Greek Catholic Church, Antin Anhelovych, substitute Napoleon's name in the Divine Liturgy for that of Austrian Emperor Francis I. Anhelovych refused, and was imprisoned. When the Austrians retook control over Lviv, Anhelovych was awarded the cross of Leopold by the Emperor.

As a result of the reforms, over the next century the Greek-Catholic Church in Austrian Galicia ceased being a puppet of foreign interests and became the primary cultural force within the Ukrainian community. Most independent native Ukrainian cultural and political trends (such as Rusynophilia, Russophilia and later Ukrainophilia) emerged from within the ranks of the Greek-Catholic Church clergy. The participation of Greek Catholic priests or their children in western Ukrainian cultural and political life was so great that western Ukrainians were accused of wanting to create a theocracy in western Ukraine by their Polish rivals. Among the political trends that emerged, the Christian social movement was particularly linked to the Ukrainian Catholic Church. Many people saw the Austrians as having saved the Ukrainians and their Church from the Poles, though it was the Poles who set into motion the Greek-Catholic cast of their church.

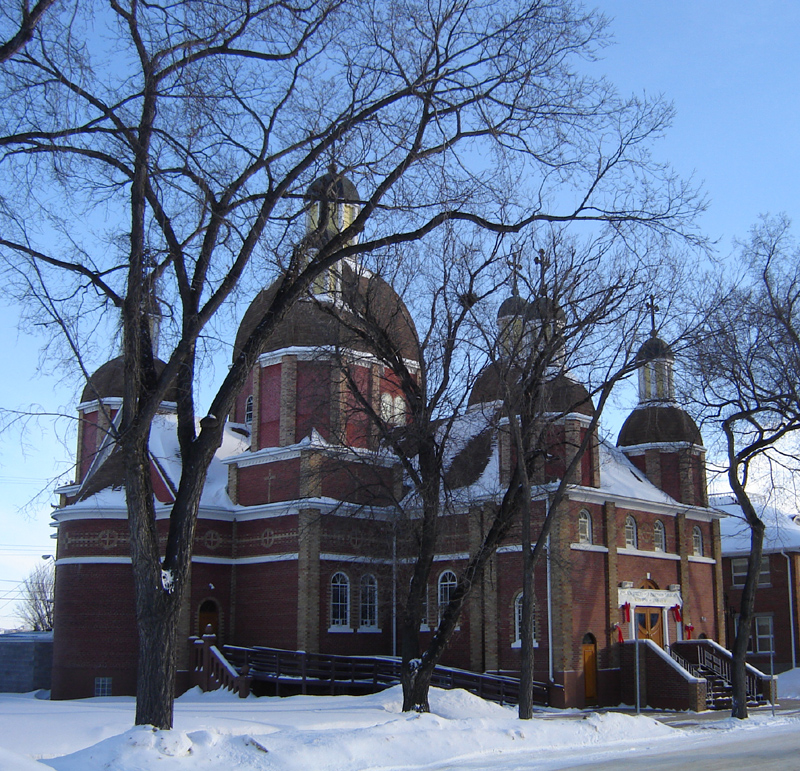
St George's Ukrainian Greek Catholic Church built by the architect Philip Ruh in 1923. Protected Heritage site, Saskatoon, Saskatchewan

=== The Church in the Russian Empire and the Soviet Union ===
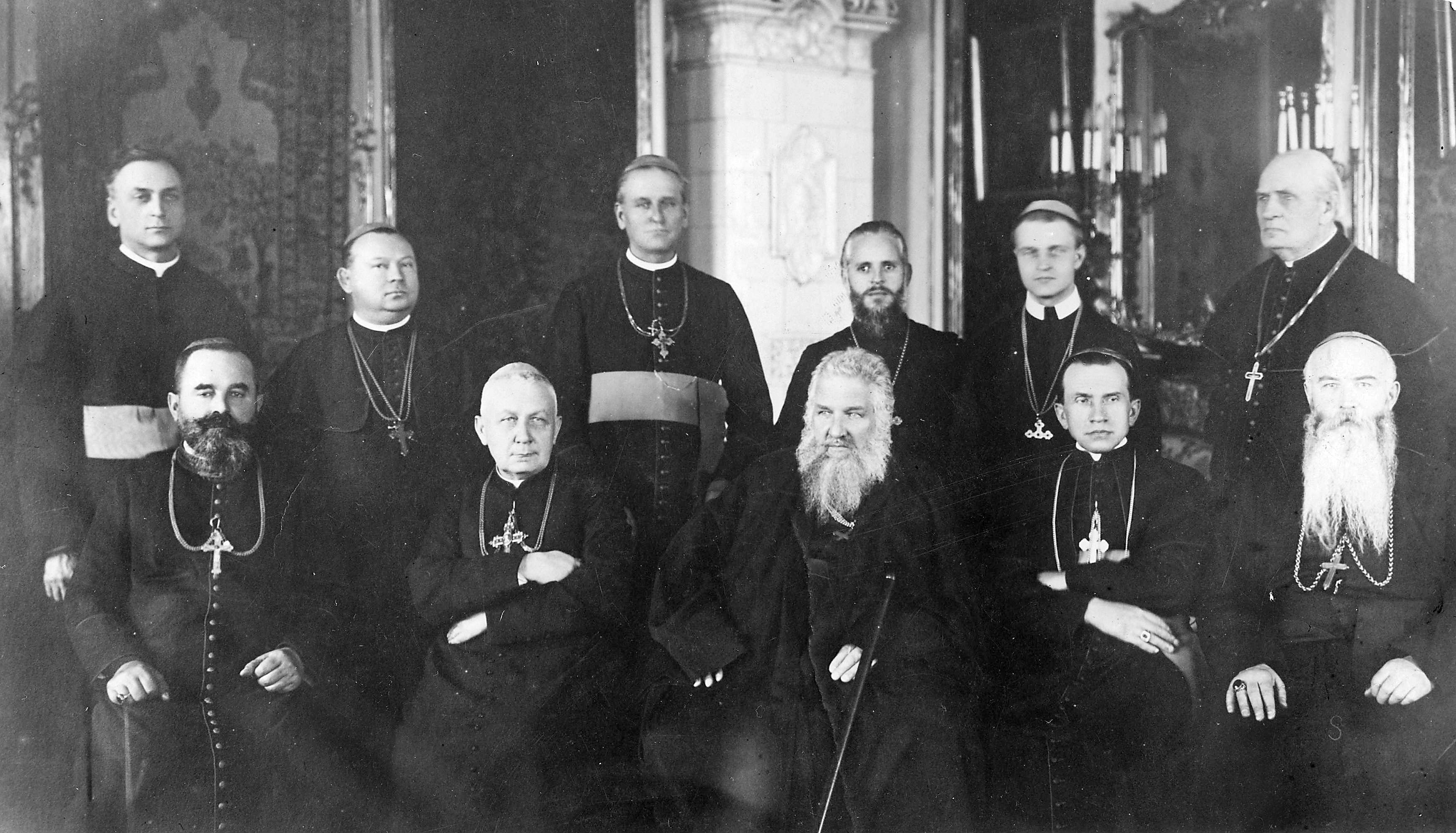
Bishops of Ukrainian Greek Catholic Church. St. George's Cathedral, Lviv, Lviv 12.1927. Sitting: bp. Hryhory Khomyshyn, Metropolitan Archbishop Andrey Sheptytsky, bp. Nykyta Budka, bp. Josaphat Kotsylovsky.

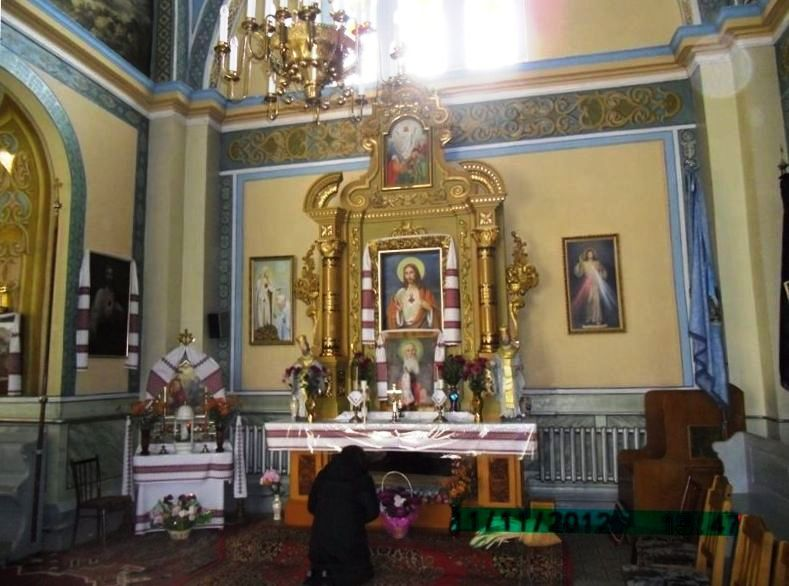
Stryi. The relics of the blessed of Josaphat Kotsylovsky

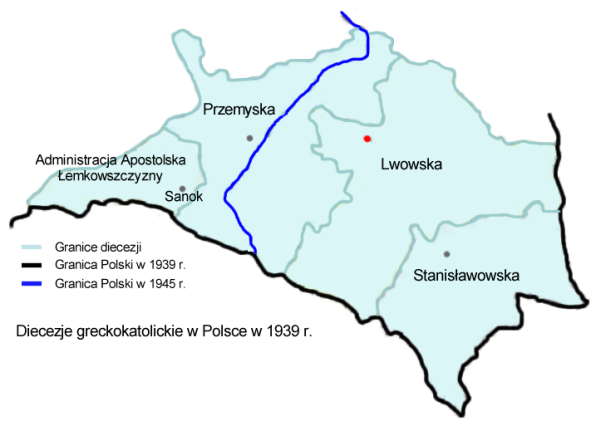
Map of the Ukrainian Catholic Church in the province of Lviv in 1939

After World War I, Ukrainian Greek Catholics found themselves under the governance of the nations of Poland, Hungary, Romania and Czechoslovakia. Under the previous century of Austrian rule, the Ukrainian Greek Catholic Church attained such a strong Ukrainian national character that in interwar Poland, the Greek Catholics of Galicia were seen by the nationalist Polish and Catholic state as even less patriotic than the Orthodox Volhynians. Extending its Polonization policies to its Eastern Territories, the Polish authorities sought to weaken the UGCC. In 1924, following a visit with Ukrainian Catholic believers in North America and western Europe, the head of the UGCC was initially denied reentry to Lwów (the Polish name at the time for Lviv), only being allowed back after a considerable delay. Polish Catholic priests, led by their Latin bishops, began missionary work among Greek Catholics; and administrative restrictions were placed on the Ukrainian Greek Catholic Church.

After World War II Ukrainian Catholics came under the rule of Communist Poland and the hegemony of the Soviet Union. With only a few clergy invited to attend, a synod was convened in Lviv, which revoked the Union of Brest. Officially all of the church property was transferred to the Russian Orthodox Church under the Moscow Patriarchate, Most of the Ukrainian Greek Catholic clergy went underground. This catacomb church was strongly supported by its diaspora in the Western Hemisphere. Emigration to the U.S. and Canada, which had begun in the 1870s, increased after World War II.

According to Karel C. Berkhoff, during the Nazi occupation of Ukraine, the treatment of Christian churches by German authorities varied from denomination to denomination. The Nazi authorities were friendly towards Ukrainian Protestants and treated them with "magnanimity", and were left unsuppressed; pacifist denominations were specifically favoured as well. Meanwhile, Greek and Latin Catholics were harshly persecuted, something that Berkhoff attributes to "Nazi hostility to the Vatican combined with hostility to the Poles, who in Ukraine constituted the vast majority of these Christians". Latin Catholic and Uniate churches were closed, and Catholic clergy was a common target of Nazi executions. Nazi anti-Catholic policies were extended to Germans as well – the Catholic church in Mykolaiv was also forcefully closed, despite most of the parishioners being ethnic Germans.

In the winter of 1944–1945, Ukrainian Greek Catholic clergy were summoned to 'reeducation' sessions conducted by the NKVD. Near the end of the war in Europe, the state media began an anti-Ukrainian-Catholic campaign. The creation of the community in 1596 was discredited in publications, which went to great pains to try to prove the Church was conducting activities directed against Ukrainians in the first half of the 20th century.

In 1945, Soviet authorities arrested, deported, and sentenced to forced-labor camps in Siberia and elsewhere the church's metropolitan Yosyf Slipyi and nine other Greek Catholic bishops, as well as hundreds of clergy and leading lay activists. In Lviv alone, 800 priests were imprisoned. All the above-mentioned bishops and significant numbers of clergymen died in prisons, concentration camps, internal exile, or soon after their release during the post-Stalin thaw. The exception was metropolitan Yosyf Slipyi who, after 18 years of imprisonment and persecution, was released in 1963 thanks to the intervention of Pope John XXIII. Slipyi took refuge in Rome, where he received the title of Major Archbishop of Lviv, and became a cardinal in 1965.

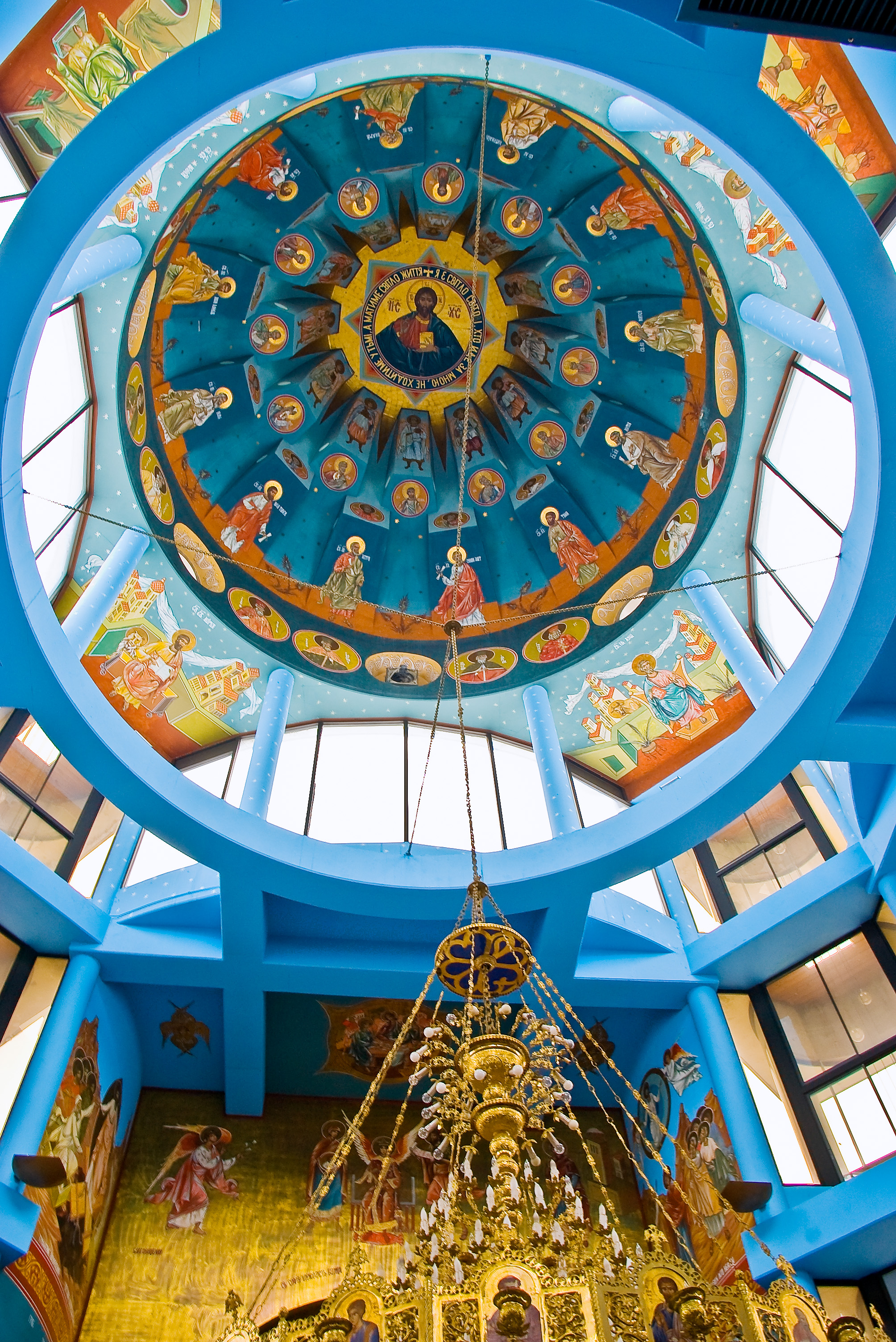
The center dome of St. Joseph the Betrothed Ukrainian Greek Catholic Church in Chicago, Illinois

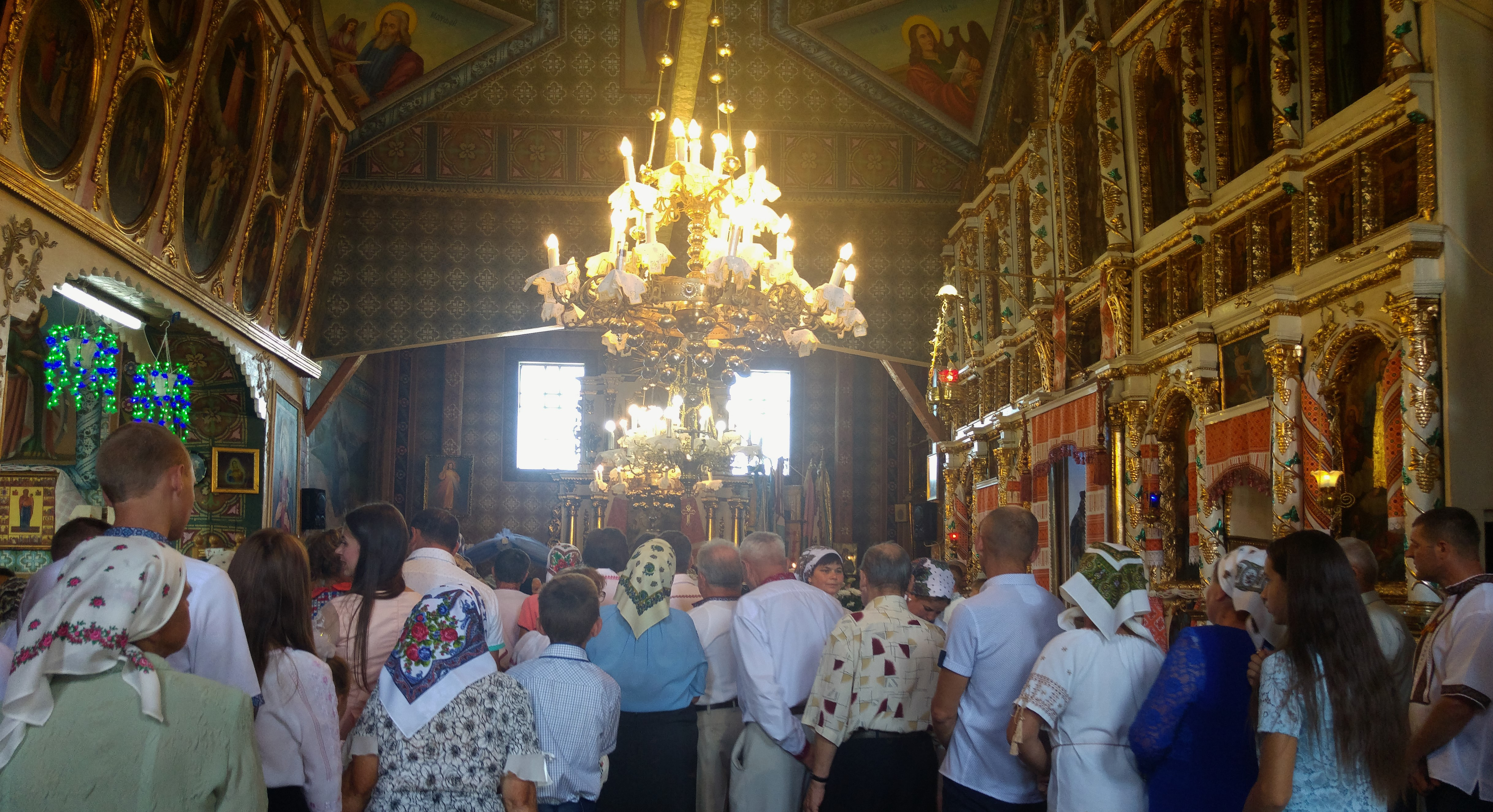
The interior of Greek Catholic Church in Spas, Ukraine

The clergy who joined the Russian Orthodox Church were spared the large-scale persecution of religion that occurred elsewhere in the country (see Religion in the Soviet Union). In the city of Lviv, only one church was closed (at a time when many cities in the rest of Ukraine did not have a working church). Moreover, the western dioceses of Lviv-Ternopil and Ivano-Frankivsk were the largest in the USSR and contained the majority of the Russian Orthodox Church's cloisters (particularly convents, of which there were seven in Ukrainian SSR but none in Russia). Orthodox canon law was also relaxed on the clergy allowing them to shave beards (a practice uncommon to Orthodoxy) and conduct liturgy in Ukrainian as opposed to Church Slavonic.

The Ukrainian Catholics continued to exist underground for decades and were the subject of vigorous attacks in the state media. The clergy gave up public exercise of their clerical duties, but secretly provided services for many lay people. Many priests took up civilian professions and celebrated the sacraments in private. The identities of former priests could have been known to the Soviet police who regularly watched, interrogated and fined them, but stopped short of arrest unless their activities went beyond a small circle of people. New secretly ordained priests were often treated more harshly.

The church even grew during this time, and this was acknowledged by Soviet sources. The first secretary of the Lviv Komsomol, Oleksiy Babiychuk, claimed:

in this oblast, particularly in the rural areas, a large number of the population adheres to religious practices, among them a large proportion of youth. In the last few years, the activity of the Uniates [Ukrainian Catholics] has grown, that of representatives of the Uniates as well as former Uniate priests; there are even reverberations to renew the overt activity of this Church.

After Stalin died, Ukrainian Catholics hoped this would lead to better conditions for themselves, but such hopes were dashed in the late 1950s when the authorities arrested even more priests and unleashed a new wave of anti-Catholic propaganda. Secret ordinations occurred in exile. Secret theological seminaries in Ternopil and Kolomyia were reported in the Soviet press in the 1960s when their organizers were arrested. In 1974, a clandestine convent was uncovered in Lviv.

During the Soviet era, the Ukrainian Greek Catholic Church did flourish throughout the Ukrainian diaspora. Cardinal Yosyf Slipyi was jailed as a dissident but named in pectore (in secret) a cardinal in 1949; he was freed in 1963 and was the subject of an extensive campaign to have him named as a patriarch, which met with strong support as well as controversy. Pope Paul VI demurred, but compromised with the creation of a new title of major archbishop (assigned to Yosyf Slipyi on 23 December 1963 ), with a jurisdiction roughly equivalent to that of a patriarch in an Eastern church. This title has since passed to Myroslav Ivan Lubachivsky in 1984 and thereafter to Lubomyr Husar in 2000 and Sviatoslav Shevchuk in 2011; this title has also been granted to the heads of three other Eastern Catholic Churches.

In 1968, when the Greek Catholic Church was legalized in Czechoslovakia, a large-scale campaign was launched to harass recalcitrant clergy who remained illegal. These clergy were subject to interrogations, fines and beatings. In January 1969 the KGB arrested an underground Catholic bishop named Vasyl Velychkovsky and two Catholic priests, and sentenced them to three years of imprisonment for breaking anti-religious legislation.

Activities that could lead to arrest included holding religious services, educating children as Catholics, performing baptisms, conducting weddings or funerals, hearing confessions or giving the last rites, copying religious materials, possessing prayer books, possessing icons, possessing church calendars, possessing religious books or other sacred objects. Conferences were held to discuss how to perfect the methodology in combatting Ukrainian Catholicism in West Ukraine.

At times the Ukrainian Catholics attempted to employ legal channels to have their community recognized by the state. In 1956–1957, there were petitions to the proper authorities to request for churches to be opened. More petitions were sent in the 60s and 70s, all of which were refused. In 1976, a priest named Volodymyr Prokipov was arrested for presenting such a petition to Moscow. The response to these petitions by the state had been to sharpen attacks against the community.

In 1984 a samizdat Chronicle of the Catholic Church began to be published by Ukrainian Catholics. The founder of the group behind this publication, Yosef Terelya, was arrested in 1985 and sentenced to seven years imprisonment and five years of exile. His successor, Vasely Kobryn, was arrested and sentenced to three years of exile.

The Solidarity movement in Poland and Pope John Paul II supported the Ukrainian Catholics. The state media attacked John Paul II. The antireligious journal Liudyna i Svit (Man and the World) published in Kyiv wrote:

Proof that the Church is persistently striving to strengthen its political influence in socialist countries is witnessed by the fact that Pope John Paul II gives his support to the emigre hierarchy of the so-called Ukrainian Catholic Church . . .. The current tactic of Pope John Paul II and the Roman Curia lies in the attempts to strengthen the position of the Church in all socialist countries as they have done in Poland, where the Vatican tried to raise the status of the Catholic Church to a state within a state. In the last few years, the Vatican has paid particular attention to the question of Catholicism of the Slavonic nations. This is poignantly underscored by the Pope when he states that he is not only a Pope of Polish origin, but the first Slavic Pope, and he will pay particular attention to the Christianization of all Slavic nations.

By the late 1980s there was a shift in the Soviet government's attitude towards religion. At the height of Mikhail Gorbachev's liberalization reforms the Ukrainian Greek Catholic Church was allowed again to function officially in December 1989. But then it found itself largely in disarray with the nearly all of its pre-1946 parishes and property lost to the Orthodox faith. The church, actively supported by nationalist organizations such as Rukh and later the UNA-UNSO, took an uncompromising stance towards the return of its lost property and parishes. According to a Greek-Catholic priest, "even if the whole village is now Orthodox and one person is Greek Catholic, the church [building] belongs to that Catholic because the church was built by his grandparents and great-grandparents."

The weakened Soviet authorities were unable to pacify the situation, and most of the parishes in Galicia came under the control of the Greek-Catholics during the events of a large scale inter-confessional rivalry that was often accompanied by violent clashes of the faithful provoked by their religious and political leadership. These tensions led to a rupture of relations between the Moscow Patriarchate and the Vatican.

== Current situation ==
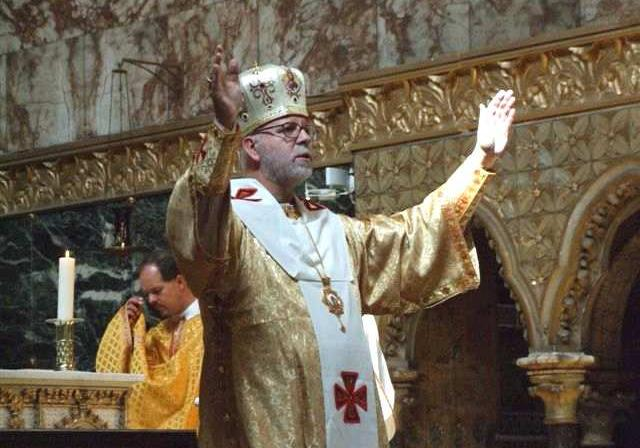
Bishop Paul Patrick Chomnycky in London.

=== Membership ===
The Ukrainian Greek Catholic Church is the second largest Eastern Catholic Church in the world. As of 2022, it had approximately 4.2 million members. In Ukraine, the UGCC is the second largest religious organization in terms of number of communities within the Catholic Church. The Ukrainian Greek Catholic Church has third most members in allegiance among the population of Ukraine after the Ukrainian Orthodox Church (Moscow Patriarchate) and the Orthodox Church of Ukraine. The Ukrainian Greek Catholic Church predominates in three western oblasts of Ukraine, including the majority of the population of Lviv, but constitutes a small minority elsewhere in the country.

The church has followed the spread of the Ukrainian diaspora and has some 40 hierarchs in over a dozen countries on four continents, including three other metropolitan bishops in Poland, the United States, and Canada. The Church in the diaspora including the United States and Canada is largely multi-ethnic. National surveys conducted since 2000 show that between 5.3% and 9.4% of Ukraine's total population are of the Ukrainian Greek Catholic Church. In surveys, 18.6–21.3% of believers or religious people in Ukraine were Greek Catholic. Worldwide, the faithful now number some 6 to 10 million, forming the second largest particular Catholic Church, after the majority Latin Church.

According to a 2015 survey, followers of the Ukrainian Greek Catholic Church make up 8.1% of the total population (excluding Crimea) and form the majority in 3 oblasts:

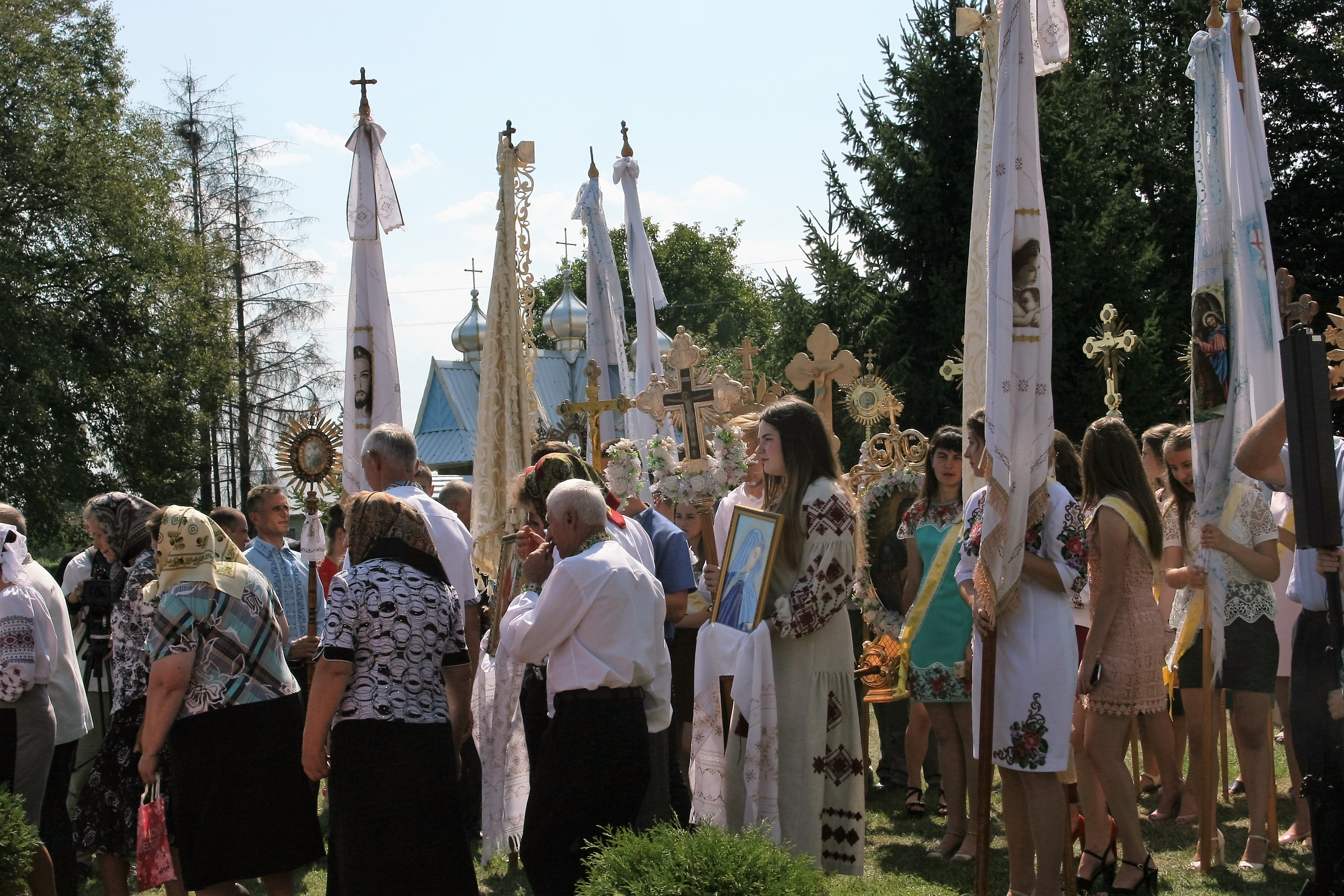
The Feast of the Transfiguration in Ukraine in 2017

- Lviv Oblast — 59% of the population
- Ivano-Frankivsk Oblast — 57%
- Ternopil Oblast — 52%

In 2026, Major Archbishop Sviatoslav Shevchuk claimed that recent numbers showed an increase in membership of the Church, from 8% to 12%, making it the only major Christian Church in the country to have seen a rise in members.

=== Liturgy ===
Most Ukrainian Catholic Churches have moved away from Church Slavonic; church services are mainly in the Ukrainian language. Many churches also offer liturgies in a country's vernacular (i.e. German in Germany or English in Canada). Some parishes continue to celebrate the liturgy in Slavonic even today, however, and services in a mix of languages are not unusual.

=== Governance ===
In the early first decade of the 21st century, the major see of the Ukrainian Catholic Church was transferred to the Ukrainian capital of Kyiv. The enthronement of the new head of the church Major Archbishop Sviatoslav Shevchuk took place there on 27 March 2011 at the cathedral under construction on the left bank. On 18 August 2013, the Patriarchal Cathedral of the Resurrection of Christ was dedicated and solemnly opened.

On 5 July 2019, Pope Francis declared to the church's leaders during a meeting in the Vatican "I hold you in my heart, and I pray for you, dear Ukrainian brothers." He also advocated greater humanitarian aid to Ukraine and warned the Church's Bishops to "foster a spirit of closeness" with their church members. The Pope also told the Church leaders to that "fruitful" unity within the Church can be achieved through three important aspects of synodality: listening; shared responsibility; and the involvement of the laity.

=== Monastic orders and religious congregations ===
The following orders and congregations operate in Ukraine:

==== Male ====
- Order of Saint Basil the Great
- Studite Brethren
- Congregation of the Most Holy Redeemer
- Congregation of the Salesian Fathers of St. Don Bosco
- Miles Jesu
- Missionary Congregation of Saint Andrew the Apostle.
- Monastery of the Three Holy Hierarchs

==== Female ====
- Sisters of the Order of Saint Basil the Great
- Sisters Servants of Mary Immaculate
- Sisters of St. Joseph, the Spouse of the Virgin Mary (related to Sisters of St. Joseph)
- Sisters Catechists of Saint Anne (related to Sisters of Saint Anne)
- Sisters of the Holy Family
- Sisters of the Priest and Martyr St. Josaphat Kuntsevych
- Sisters of Mercy of St. Vincent de Paul (related to Daughters of Charity of Saint Vincent de Paul)
- Salesian Sisters
- Sisters of the Most Holy Eucharist
- Myrrh-bearing Sisters under the Protection of St. Mary Magdalene

=== Prison ministry ===
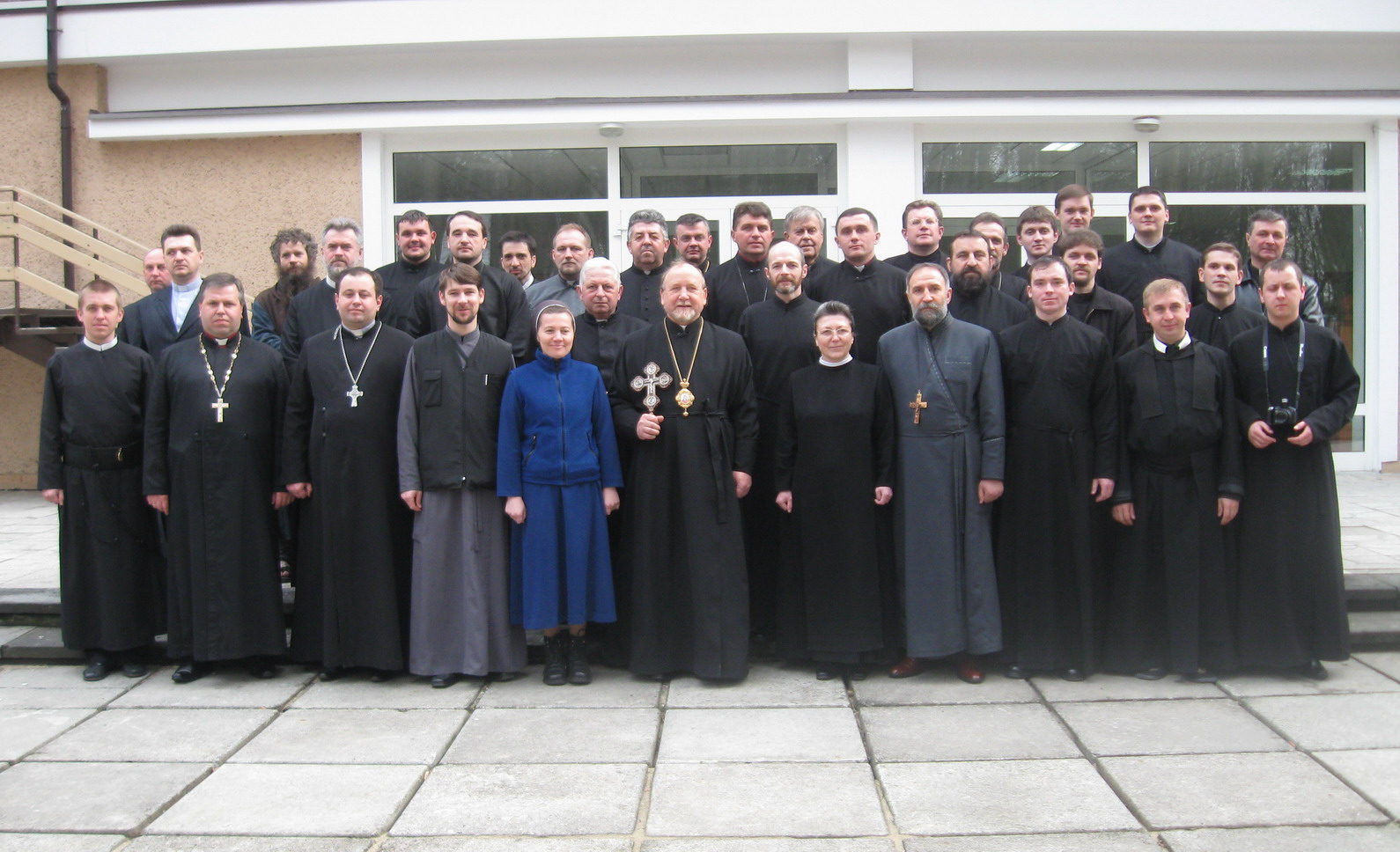
Prison chaplains of the UGCC, 2008

In contemporary Ukraine prison ministry of chaplains does not exist de jure. The prison pastoral care was at the very heart of the spirituality of the Ukrainian Greek-Catholic Church throughout her history. Prison Pastoral of the UGCC was restored in 1990 after the Church, formerly forbidden, emerged from the underground. Pastoral care has grown steadily from several establishments in the Western Part of Ukraine to more than 40 penal institutions in every region of the country. Since 2001 the UGCC is the co-founder of the Ukrainian Interdenominational Christian Mission "Spiritual and Charitable Care in Prisons" including twelve Churches and Denominations. This Mission is a part of the World Association of Prison Ministry. The most active prison chaplains are the Redemptorist Fathers.

In the year 2006 Lubomyr Husar established in the Patriarchal Curia of the UGCC the Department for Pastoral Care in the Armed Forces and in the Penitentiary System of Ukraine. This structure implements a general management of Prison Ministry. The chief of the Department is Most Rev. Michael Koltun, Bishop of Sokal and Zhovkva. The head of the Unit for penitentiary pastoral care is Rev. Constantin Panteley, who is directly responsible for coordination of activity in this realm. He is in direct contact with 37 priests in 12 eparchies who have been assigned responsibility for prison pastoral care. Those pastors ensure regular attendance of penitentiary facilities, investigatory isolators and prisons.

=== Media ===
Each eparchy has its own religious publication, mostly published monthly, and as of 2006, the New Star is published weekly and is available for subscription all over Ukraine. Parochial publications are often published less regularly.

=== Ukrainian diaspora ===
The Ukrainian Catholic Church in the United States has limited growth opportunities, because in the United States and in other non-Ukrainian jurisdictions, many parishes choose to focus on immigrants from Ukraine and their children (during the time the children are subject to parental control) as opposed to making new converts. They maintain this characteristic by resisting the use of English in liturgies and, in some parishes, insisting on the use of the Julian Calendar to calculate dates of Christmas, Easter, and other religious holidays, thus placing themselves outside the U.S. mainstream. The Ukrainian Catholic Church considers the descendants of those who migrated from Ukraine to be part of a "diaspora." Around 40% of the diocesan priests in the diaspora are married, compared to 90% marriage rate of diocesan priests in Ukraine.

By the time the immigrants' children, and especially the immigrants' grandchildren, grow up, they have learned English in school, know little to no Ukrainian, and are otherwise fully assimilated into U.S. Most of the children are either members of the Latin Church or join some non-Catholic denomination. To the extent that a Ukrainian Catholic Church in the United States is able to make progress toward adaptation (e.g. the use of English in its liturgies and in the conducting of parish business), the next group of immigrants arrives from the old country and insists that the church maintain its old world characteristics without change and all former progress is reversed. For this reason, many parishes and Eparchies have begun to focus on producing converts.

In Canada, the wave of immigration from Galicia in the late 19th and early 20th centuries led to the establishment of a number of Ukrainian Catholic churches in the Prairie provinces. The Ukrainian Catholic Church is also represented in other provinces, for example by the Ukrainian Catholic Eparchy of Toronto and Eastern Canada, which includes dioceses in Ontario, Quebec, and Nova Scotia, and the Ukrainian Catholic Eparchy of New Westminster in British Columbia.

== Administrative organisation ==
=== Historic administrative division ===
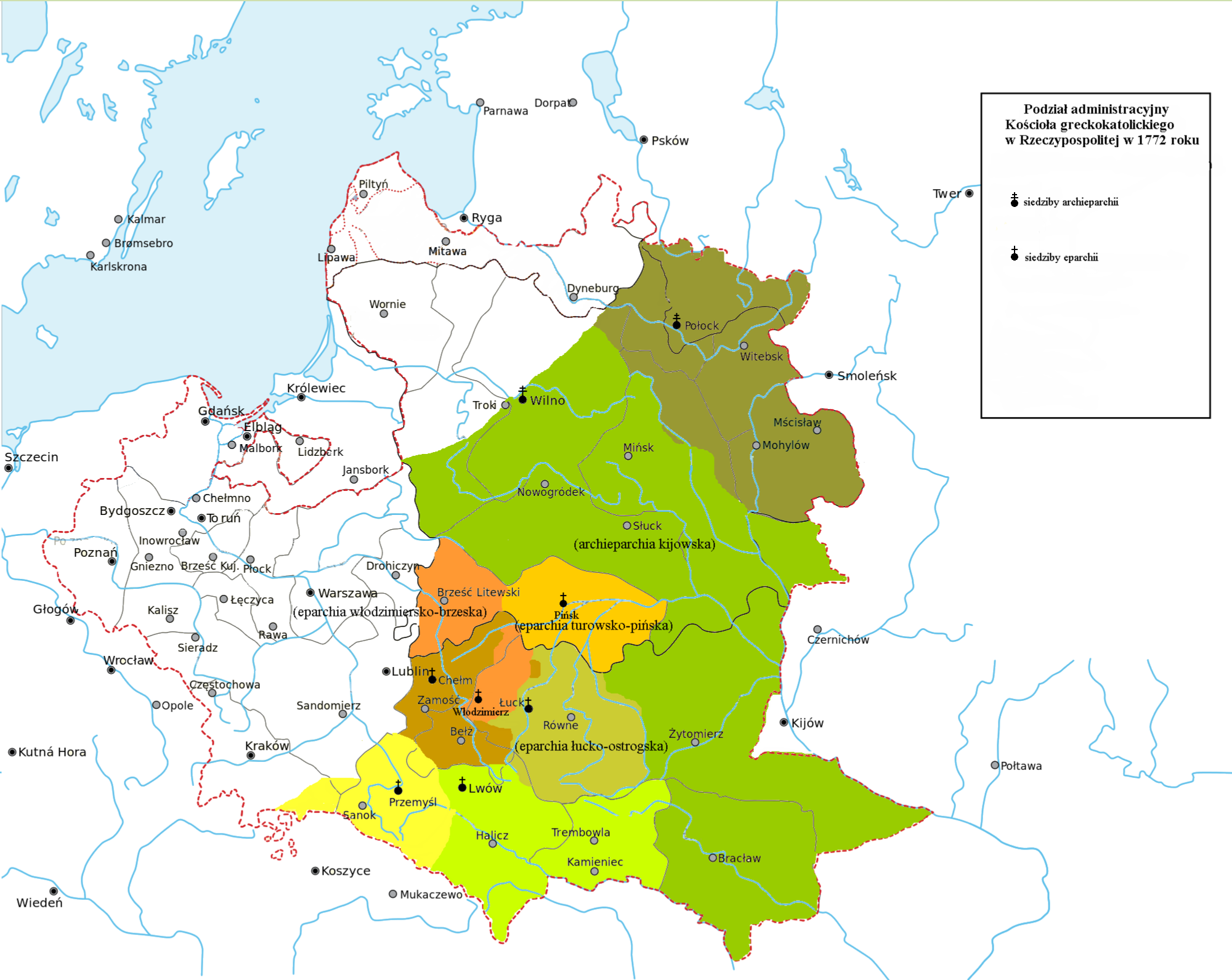
The administrative divisions of the Ruthenian Uniate (Greek-Catholic) Church in 1772 (before partition of Poland)

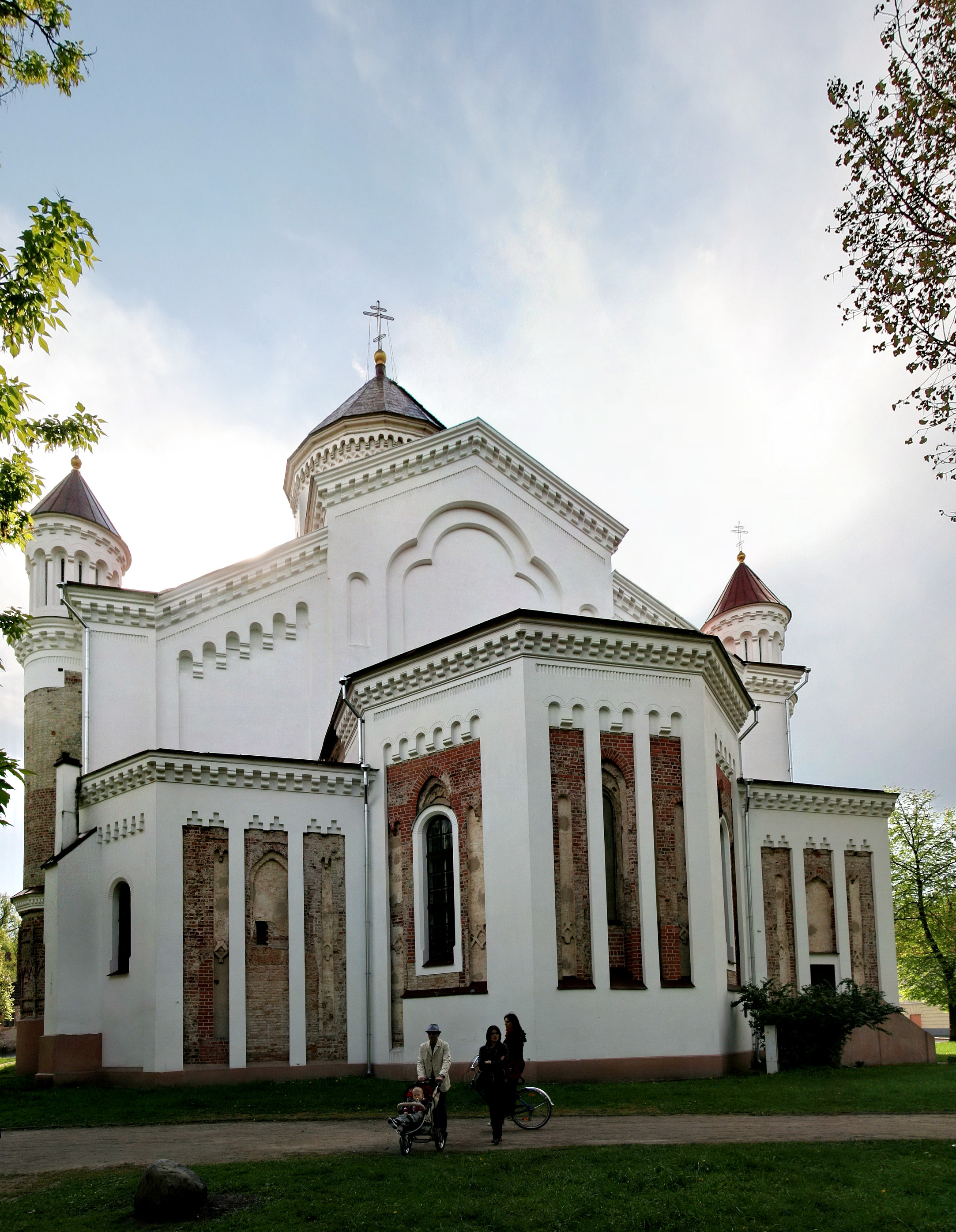
Cathedral of the Theotokos in Vilnius, mother church of Ruthenian Uniate Church

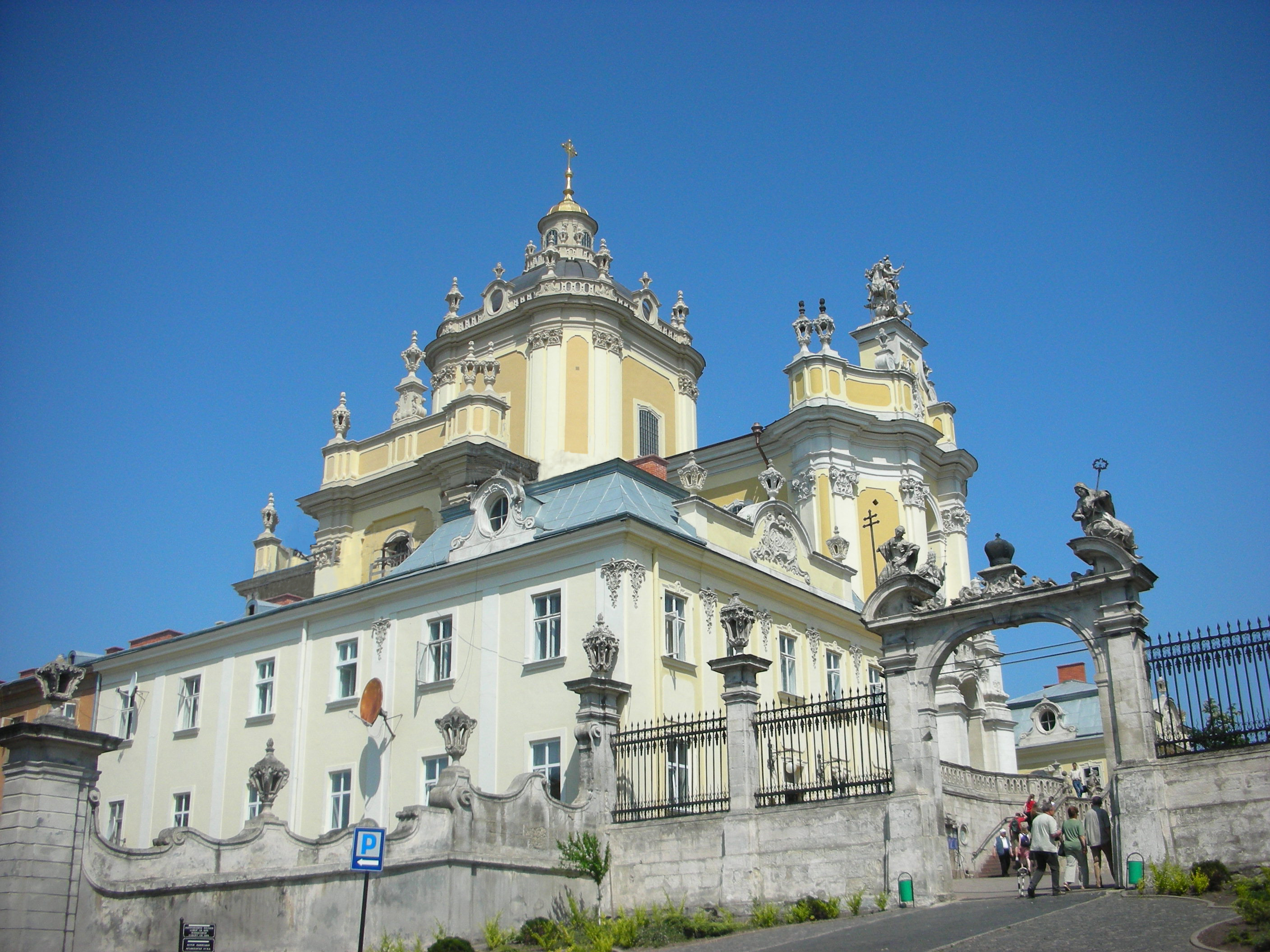
St. George's Cathedral in Lviv, mother church of Ukrainian Greek Catholic Church

==== Ruthenian Uniate (eparchies) and partition of Poland ====
- Vilno archeparchy (Metropolitan of Kyiv) → Russia
- Polotsk archeparchy (Polotsk) → Russia
- Smolensk archeparchy (Smolensk) → Russia
- Lutsk-Ostroh eparchy (Lutsk) → Russia
- Turow-Pinsk eparchy (Pinsk) → Russia
- Volodymyr-Brest eparchy (Volodymyr) → Suprasl eparchy in Germany
- Halych-Kamianets eparchy (Lviv) → Lemberg archeparchy (Metropolitan of Galicia) in Austria
- Chelm-Belz eparchy (Chelm) → Austria
- Przemysl-Sanok eparchy (Przemysl) → Austria

==== Greek Catholic church after the 1839 Synod of Polotsk ====
- Archeparchy of Lemberg (Lviv, Metropolitan of Galicia)
- Eparchy of Kulm and Belz (Chelm) covering Kingdom of Poland → territory lost due to Congress of Vienna
- Eparchy of Premissel and Saanig (Przemysl)
- added eparchy of Stanislau (Ivano-Frankivsk)
- added apostolic exarchate of Lemkowszczyna (Sanok)

==== Cathedrals ====
Ruthenian Uniate Church

(governing title Metropolitan of Kyiv, Galicia and all Ruthenia)

- 1609–1746 Cathedral of the Theotokos, Vilnius by Hypatius Pociej
- 1746–1809 Cathedral of Saint Trinity, Radomyshl

Ukrainian Greek Catholic Church

(governing title Metropolitan of Galicia, since 2005 – Major Archbishop of Kyiv-Galicia)

- 1816–1946 St. George's Cathedral, Lviv
- 1946–1989 Church liquidated by Soviet authorities (preserved on efforts of Josyf Slipyj at Santa Sofia a Via Boccea)
- 1989–2011 St. George's Cathedral, Lviv
- 2011–present Patriarchal Cathedral of the Resurrection of Christ, Kyiv

==== Primates ====
- 1808 – 1814 Antoni of Galicia (as Meteropolitan bishop of Galicia)
- 1816 – 1858 Michael of Galicia (as Meteropolitan bishop of Galicia, Primate of Galicia and Lodomeria)
- 1860 – 1863 Gregory of Galicia (as Meteropolitan bishop of Galicia)
- 1864 – 1869 Spyridon of Galicia (as Meteropolitan bishop of Galicia)
- 1870 – 1882 Joseph I of Galicia (as Meteropolitan bishop of Galicia)
- 1885 – 1898 Sylvester of Galicia (as Meteropolitan bishop of Galicia)
- 1899 – 1900 Julian of Galicia (as Meteropolitan bishop of Galicia)
- 1901 – 1944 Andrew of Galicia (as Meteropolitan bishop of Galicia)
- 1944 – 1963 Joseph II of Galicia (as Meteropolitan bishop of Galicia, persecution)
  - 1963 – 1984 Joseph II of Galicia (as Major archbishop of Galicia, exile (1963–1984))
  - 1984 – 1991 Myroslav of Galicia (as Major archbishop of Galicia, exile (1984–1991))
  - 1963 – 1971 Vasyl Velychkovsky (Ukrainian Greek Catholic Church in catacombs, locum tenens)
  - 1971 – 1991 Volodymyr Sterniuk (Ukrainian Greek Catholic Church in catacombs, locum tenens)
- 1991 – 2000 Myroslav of Galicia (as Major archbishop of Galicia)
- 2001 – 2005 Liubomyr of Galicia (as Major archbishop of Galicia)
- 2005 – 2011 Liubomyr of Kyiv-Galicia (as Major archbishop of Kyiv-Galicia)
- 2011 – present Sviatoslav of Kyiv-Galicia (as Major archbishop of Kyiv-Galicia)

=== Current administrative division ===
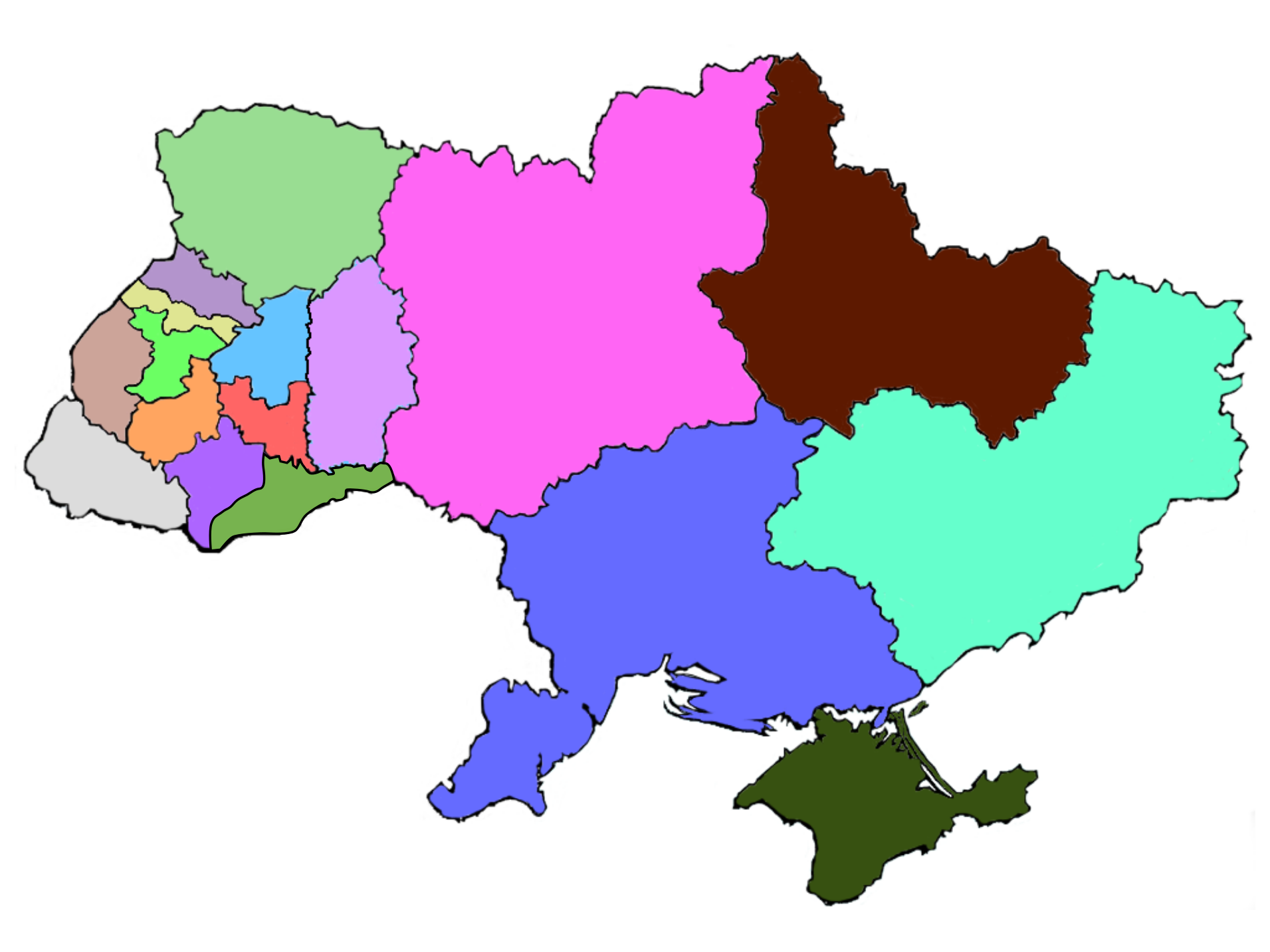

The Greek Catholic Eparchy of Mukachevo belongs to jurisdiction of the Ruthenian Greek Catholic Church rather than the Ukrainian Greek Catholic Church.

The Ukrainian Greek Catholic Church moved its administrative center from Western Ukrainian Lviv to a new cathedral in Kyiv on 21 August 2005. The title of the head of the UGCC was changed from The Major Archbishop of Lviv to The Major Archbishop of Kyiv and Halych.

The Patriarchal Curia of the Ukrainian Greek-Catholic Church is an organ of Sviatoslav Shevchuk, the head of the UGCC, Major Archbishop of Kyiv and Halych, which coordinates and promotes the common activity of the UGCC in Ukraine to make influence on society in different spheres: education, policy, culture, etc. The Curia develops action of the Church's structures, enables relations and cooperation with other Churches and major public institutions in religious and social areas for implementation of the Social Doctrine of the Catholic Church through everyday life.

In 2011 the church introduced territorial subdivisions in Ukraine, metropolia. A metropolitan bishop, an archbishop of main archeparchy, may gather own metropolitan synod, decisions of which shall be approved by the Major Archbishop.

This is a list of the eparchies of the church that are subject to the Major Archbishop:

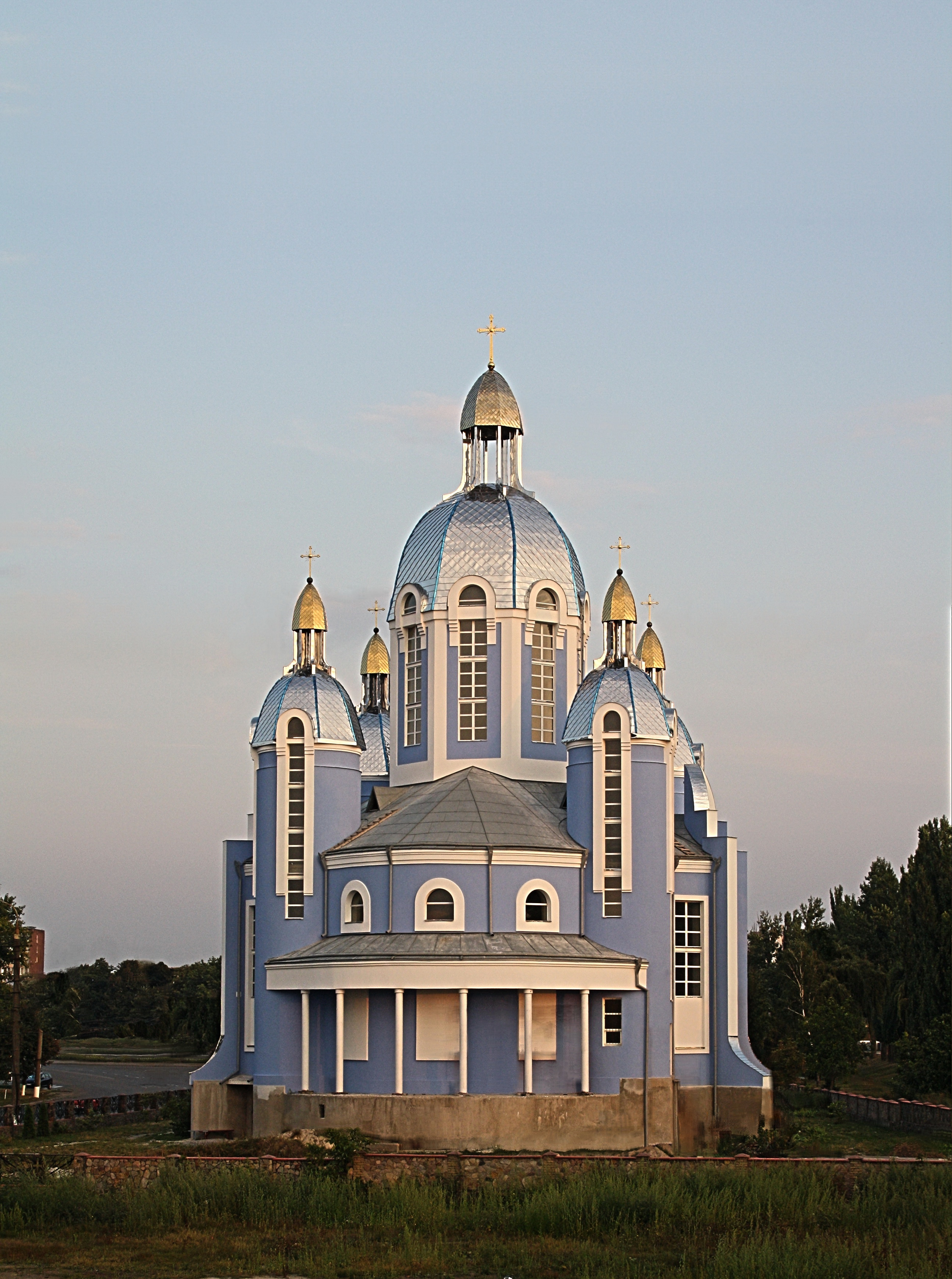
Ukrainian Greek Catholic Church in Vinnytsia

Note: Holy See uses the adjective Ucrainorum to differentiate dioceses from the regular Latin Church dioceses in Ukraine (Latinorum in Ucraina).

- Metropolitis of Kyiv – Galicia (2005)
  - Ukrainian Catholic Archeparchy of Kyiv (Latin: Archidioecesis Kioviensis, previously as uniate diocese, 1996)
  - Ukrainian Catholic Archiepiscopal Exarchate of Donetsk (2002)
  - Ukrainian Catholic Archiepiscopal Exarchate of Odesa (2003)
  - Ukrainian Catholic Archiepiscopal Exarchate of Lutsk (previously as uniate diocese, 2008)
  - Ukrainian Catholic Archiepiscopal Exarchate of Crimea (2014 as administration in Odesa)
  - Ukrainian Catholic Archiepiscopal Exarchate of Kharkiv (2014)
- Metropolis of Lviv (1808–2005, 2011)
  - Ukrainian Catholic Archeparchy of Lviv (Latin: Archidioecesis Leopolitana Ucrainorum, 1539–1946, 1989)
  - Ukrainian Catholic Eparchy of Sambir–Drohobych (1993)
  - Ukrainian Catholic Eparchy of Zboriv (1993–2000)
  - Ukrainian Catholic Eparchy of Stryi (2000)
  - Ukrainian Catholic Eparchy of Sokal–Zhovkva (2000)
- Metropolis of Ternopil – Zboriv (2011)
  - Ukrainian Catholic Archeparchy of Ternopil–Zboriv (1993)
  - Ukrainian Catholic Eparchy of Buchach (2000)
  - Ukrainian Catholic Eparchy of Kamyanets-Podilskyi (previously as united diocese, 2015)
- Metropolis of Ivano-Frankivsk (2011)
  - Ukrainian Catholic Archeparchy of Ivano-Frankivsk (1885–1946, 1989)
  - Ukrainian Catholic Eparchy of Kolomyia (1993)
  - Ukrainian Catholic Eparchy of Chernivtsi (2017)
- Metropolis of Przemyśl–Warsaw (Poland, 1996)
  - Ukrainian Catholic Archeparchy of Przemyśl–Warsaw (1087–1946, 1991, as eparchy)
  - Ukrainian Catholic Eparchy of Wrocław-Koszalin (1996)
  - Ukrainian Catholic Eparchy of Olsztyn–Gdańsk (2020)
- Metropolis of Winnipeg (Canada, 1956)
  - Ukrainian Catholic Archeparchy of Winnipeg (1912)
  - Ukrainian Catholic Eparchy of Edmonton (1948)
  - Ukrainian Catholic Eparchy of Toronto and Eastern Canada (1948)
  - Ukrainian Catholic Eparchy of Saskatoon (1951)
  - Ukrainian Catholic Eparchy of New Westminster (1974)
- Metropolis of Philadelphia (United States, 1958)
  - Ukrainian Catholic Archeparchy of Philadelphia (1913)
  - Ukrainian Catholic Eparchy of Stamford (1956)
  - Ukrainian Catholic Eparchy of Chicago (1961)
  - Ukrainian Catholic Eparchy of Parma (1983)
- Metropolis of Curitiba (Brazil, 2014)
  - Ukrainian Catholic Archeparchy of Curitiba (1962)
  - Ukrainian Catholic Eparchy of Prudentópolis (2014)

Eparchies subject to the Major Archbishop without being in his metropolis:

  - Ukrainian Catholic Eparchy of Buenos Aires (Argentina, 1968)
  - Ukrainian Catholic Eparchy of Melbourne (Australia, New Zealand and Oceania, 1958)
  - Ukrainian Catholic Eparchy of the Holy Family of London (England, Scotland and Wales, 1957)
  - Ukrainian Catholic Eparchy of Saint Wladimir-Le-Grand de Paris (France, Switzerland and Benelux, 1960)

This is a list of eparchies of the church that are exempt (i.e. directly dependent on the Holy See):

- Ukrainian Catholic Apostolic Exarchate of Germany and Scandinavia* (1959)
- Ukrainian Catholic Apostolic Exarchate of Italy* (2019)

As of 2014, the Ukrainian Greek Catholic Church is estimated to have 4,468,630 faithful, 39 bishops, 3993 parishes, 3008 diocesan priests, 399 religious-order priests, 818 men religious, 1459 women religious, 101 deacons, and 671 seminarians.

=== Current hierarchy of the Ukrainian Greek Catholic Church ===
The present Ukrainian Greek Catholic episcopate (565 hierarchs as per 6 August 2026) is as follows:

Major Archbishop and Primate:

- Sviatoslav Shevchuk – Major Archbishop of Kyiv-Halych, Metropolitan of Kyiv (since 2011)

Metropolitan Archbishops:

- Ihor Vozniak, CSsR – Metropolitan of Lviv (since 2005)
- Volodymyr Viytyshyn – Metropolitan of Ivano-Frankivsk (since 2011)
- Teodor Martynyuk, MSU – Metropolitan of Ternopil-Zboriv (since 2024)
- Eugeniusz Popowicz – Metropolitan of Przemyśl–Warsaw (Poland) (since 2015)
- Borys Gudziak – Metropolitan of Philadelphia (USA) (since 2019)
- Valdomiro Koubetch, OSBM – Metropolitan of São João Batista em Curitiba (Brazil) (since 2011)
- Michael Kwiatkowski – Metropolitan of Winnipeg (Canada) (since 2026)

Eparchial Bishops and Exarchs

- Venedykt Aleksiychuk, MSU – Bishop of Saint Nicholas of Chicago (USA) (since 2017)
- Bryan Bayda, CSsR – Bishop of Toronto and Eastern Canada (since 2022)
- Mykhaylo Bubniy, CsSR – Archiepiscopal Exarch of Odesa (since 2014)
- Cardinal Mykola Bychok, CSsR – Bishop of Saints Peter and Paul of Melbourne (Australia) (since 2020)
- Paul Chomnycky, OSBM – Bishop of Stamford (USA) (since 2006)
- Bohdan Danylo – Bishop of Saint Josaphat in Parma (USA) (since 2014)
- Bohdan Dzyurakh, CSsR – Apostolic Exarch in Germany and Scandinavia (since 2021)
- Włodzimierz Juszczak, OSBM – Bishop of Wrocław-Koszalin (Poland) (since 1999)
- Yosafat Hovera – Archiepiscopal Exarch of Lutsk (since 2008)
- Dmytro Hryhorak, OSBM – Bishop of Buchach (since 2010)
- Vasyl Ivasyuk – Bishop of Kolomyia (since 2014)
- Hryhoriy Komar – Apostolic Administrator of Apostolic Exarchate of Italy (since 2025)
- Daniel Kozelinski Netto – Bishop of Santa María del Patrocinio en Buenos Aires (Argentina) (since 2016)
- Ivan Kulyk – Bishop of Kamyanets-Podilskyi (since 2019)
- Petro Loza, CSsR – Bishop of Sokal-Zhovkva (since 2024)
- Meron Mazur, OSBM – Bishop of Imaculada Conceição in Prudentópolis (Brazil) (since 2014)
- Yosafat Moschych, CMSAA – Bishop of Chernivtsi (since 2017)
- David Motiuk – Bishop of Edmonton (Canada) (since 2007)
- Kenneth Nowakowski – Bishop of the Holy Family of London (UK) (since 2020)
- Yaroslav Pryriz, CSsR – Bishop of Sambir-Drohobych (since 2011)
- Ihor Rantsya – Bishop of Saint Vladimir the Great of Paris (France) (since 2025)
- Maksym Ryabukha, SDB – Archiepiscopal Exarch of Donetsk (since 2024)
- Taras Senkiv, OM – Bishop of Stryi (since 2014)
- Michael Smolinski, CSsR – Bishop of Saskatoon (Canada) (since 2023)
- Arkadiusz Trochanowski – Bishop of Olsztyn–Gdańsk (Poland) (since 2020)
- Vasyl Tuchapets, OSBM – Archiepiscopal Exarch of Kharkiv (since 2014)

Auxiliary and Curial Bishops

- Mariusz Dmyterko – Auxiliary Bishop of Wrocław-Koszalin (Poland) (since 2025)
- Volodymyr Firman – Auxiliary Bishop of Ternopil-Zboriv (since 2023)
- Volodymyr Hrutsa, CSsR – Auxiliary Bishop of Lviv (since 2016)
- Petro Holiney – Auxiliary Bishop of Kolomyia (since 2023)
- Andriy Khimyak – Auxiliary Bishop of Kyiv / Secretary of the Synod (since 2022)
- Bohdan Manyshyn – Auxiliary Bishop of Stryi (since 2014)
- Yosyf Milyan, MSU – Auxiliary Bishop of Kyiv (since 2009)
- Andriy Rabiy – Auxiliary Bishop of Winnipeg (Canada) (since 2022)
- Mykola Semenyshyn – Auxiliary Bishop of Ivano-Frankivsk (since 2022)
- Stepan Sus – Curial Bishop of the Major Archbishopric of Kyiv-Halych (since 2020)
- Terentiy Tsapchuk, OSBM – Auxiliary Bishop of Buchach (since 2026)

Hierarchs Emeritus

- Lawrence Huculak, OSBM – Metropolitan Emeritus of Winnipeg (Canada) (since 2026)
- Jan Martyniak – Metropolitan Emeritus of Przemyśl–Warsaw (Poland) (since 2015)
- Vasyl Semeniuk – Metropolitan Emeritus of Ternopil-Zboriv (since 2024)
- Stefan Soroka – Metropolitan Emeritus of Philadelphia (USA) (since 2018)
- Iryney Bilyk, OSBM – Bishop Emeritus of Buchach (since 2006)
- Mykhaylo Koltun, CSsR – Bishop Emeritus of Sokal-Zhovkva (since 2024)
- Petro Kryk – Apostolic Exarch Emeritus in Germany and Scandinavia (since 2021)
- Dionisio Lachovicz, OSBM – Apostolic Exarch Emeritus in Italy (since 2025)
- Hlib Lonchyna, MSU – Bishop Emeritus of the Holy Family of London (UK) (since 2019)
- Stepan Meniok, CSsR – Archiepiscopal Exarch Emeritus of Donetsk (since 2024)
- Michael Wiwchar, CSsR – Bishop Emeritus of Saskatoon (Canada) (since 2008)

== Issues and policies ==
=== De-Latinization vs. Traditionalism ===
==== Background ====
Even before the Second Vatican Council the Holy See declared it important to guard and preserve the customs and distinct forms for administering the sacraments in use in the Eastern Catholic Churches (see Pope Leo XIII's encyclical letter Orientalium Dignitas). After the Russian Revolution of 1905, the underground parish of the Russian Greek Catholic Church in St. Petersburg split between the followers of Pro-Latinisation priest Fr. Aleksei Zerchaninov and those of Pro-Orientalist priest Fr. Ivan Deubner. When asked by Metropolitan Andrey Sheptytsky to make a decision on the dispute, Pope Pius X decreed that Russian Greek Catholic priests should offer the Divine Liturgy Nec Plus, Nec Minus, Nec Aliter ("No more, No Less, No Different") than priests of the Russian Orthodox Church and the Old Believers.

In the Ukrainian Greek Catholic Church, liturgical de-latinization began with the 1930s corrections of the liturgical books by Metropolitan Andrey Sheptytsky. According to his biographer Cyril Korolevsky, Metropolitan Andrey opposed use of coercion against those who remained attached to Latin liturgical practices, fearing that any attempt to do so would lead to a Greek-Catholic equivalent of the 1666 Schism within the Russian Orthodox Church.

Following the 1964 decree Orientalium Ecclesiarum during the Second Vatican Council and several subsequent documents, Latinisations were discarded within the Ukrainian diaspora. Meanwhile, among Byzantine Catholics in Western Ukraine, forced into a persecuted and secret existence following the Soviet ban on the UGCC, the latinizations remained, "an important component of their underground practices", in illegal parishes, seminaries, and religious communities. After proscription of the UGCC was lifted in 1989, priests and hierarchs arrived from the diaspora and began to enforce a liturgical conformity that has been met with considerable opposition.

In response, many priests, nuns, and candidates for the priesthood found themselves, "forced towards the periphery of the church since 1989 because of their wish to 'keep the tradition'." In some eparchies, particularly those of Ivano-Frankivsk and Ternopil-Zboriv, the bishops would immediately suspend any priest who, "displayed his inclination toward 'traditionalist' practices".

In the February 2003 issue of Patriayarkhat, the official journal of the Ukrainian Greek-Catholic Church, an article appeared written by a student at the Ukrainian Catholic University, which since its 1994 foundation has been, "the strongest progressive voice within the Church". The article named priests and parishes in every eparchy in Ukraine as being involved in "a well-organized movement" and who described themselves as "traditionalists". According to the article, they constituted "a parallel structure" with connections with the Society of St. Pius X and with a charismatic leader in Fr. Basil Kovpak, the Pastor of St. Peter and Paul's Church in the suburb of Lviv-Riasne.

According to Vlad Naumescu, "Religious life in a traditionalist parish followed the model of the 'underground church.' Devotions were more intense, with each priest promoting his parish as a 'place of pilgrimage' for the neighboring areas, thus drawing larger crowds on Sunday than his local parish could provide. On Sundays and feast days, religious services took place three times a day (in Riasne), and the Sunday liturgy lasted for two and a half to three hours. The main religious celebrations took place outside the church in the middle of the neighborhood, and on every occasion traditionalists organized long processions through the entire locality. The community was strongly united by its common opponent, re-enacting the model of the 'defender of faith' common to times of repression. This model, which presupposes clear-cut attitudes and a firm moral stance, mobilized the community and reproduced the former determination of the 'underground' believers."

==== Basil Kovpak and the Society of St. Josaphat ====
According to Vlad Naumescu, during the early 1990s, priests of the Society of Saint Pius X began visiting Western Ukraine and made contact with, "a group of Greek Catholic priests and lay members that favored liturgical latinization (an important component of their underground practices) and helped them organize into an active society."

In 1999, Basil Kovpak and two other traditionalist UGCC priests asked Society of Saint Pius X Superior General Bishop Bernard Fellay to become their spiritual leader. The reasons for this move were that the three priests hoped to obtain both approval and support from fellow Traditionalist Catholics in the West. In September 2000, Bishop Fellay agreed and the Priestly Society of St. Josaphat was founded.

The Priestly Society of Saint Josaphat extends the SSPX's criticism of indifferentism and Modernism in the Catholic Church to the Ukrainian Greek Catholic Church. They oppose certain decisions of the Second Vatican Council and aspects of ecumenism and interreligious dialogue practiced by the Ukrainian Greek Catholic Hierarchy and the Holy See.

In addition to opposing the banning of pre-Vatican II Latin liturgical practices and devotions, the Society rejects the shortened Divine Liturgy and the mirroring of the Mass of Paul VI that has been introduced from the Ukrainian diaspora, as well as the replacement of the traditional Church Slavonic liturgical language with the vernacular Ukrainian language. As an alternative, Kovpak and his fellow Greek Catholic traditionalists celebrate what they consider the Pravdyvyi ("True") Rite, which often lasts two and a half to three hours.

On 10 February 2004 Cardinal Lubomyr Husar declared Kovpak excommunicated over his links to the SSPX. Kovpak announced his plans to appeal to the Holy See. The Sacra Rota Romana accepted his appeal and declared Kovpak's excommunication null and void for lack of canonical form. The process was immediately restarted and Kovpak's second decree of excommunication was confirmed by the Congregation for the Doctrine of the Faith on 21 November 2007. While pro-Kovpak Ukrainian traditionalists have often been accused of having links to the SSPX solely for financial reasons, they would not, according to Vlad Naumescu, have been able to survive as a movement without the money donated to them by Roman Rite traditionalists.

The Society operates a seminary in Lviv, where the seminarians are taught by Kovpak and by SPPX priests visiting from Poland. The Society also consists of a group of Greek Catholic nuns, who were forced to leave the Basilian Order in 1995, "because of their 'traditionalist' ideas" and who now reside in the house where Blessed Nicholas Charnetsky died following his release from the Gulag. The room in which Kyr Nicholas died is now the convent's chapel.

Unlike the Ukrainian orthodox Greek Catholic Church, Kovpak and the PSSJK reject both Sedevacantism and Conclavism.

==== Sedevacantism and Conclavism in the Ukrainian Greek Catholic Church ====
In 2008, a group of Basilian priests from Slovakia, after relocating to the Pidhirtsi monastery, declared that four of them had been consecrated bishops without permission of the Pope or the Major Archbishop. The "Pidhirtsi fathers" have claimed they opposed de-latinization, and also further claim that the members of the hierarchy of the Ukrainian Greek catholic church follows liberal theology due to ecumenism.

Because they had consecrated bishops without the authorization of Rome they were as of consequence officially excommunicated in 2008, in 2009 they constituted themselves as the Ukrainian Orthodox Greek Catholic Church.

Having elected Czech Basilian priest Fr. Anthony Elias Dohnal as "Patriarch Elijah", they declared on 1 May 2011 that both Pope John Paul II and Pope Benedict XVI were excommunicated and that the Holy See was vacant (Sedevacantism). They added: "The Byzantine Catholic Patriarchate is now commissioned by God to protect the orthodox doctrine of the Catholic Church, including the Latin Church. Only after an orthodox Catholic hierarchy and an orthodox successor to the Papacy is elected, will the Patriarchate be relieved of this God-given duty."

On 14 October 2019, the UOGCC broke with their former policy of Sedevacantism and embraced Conclavism. They announced they had elected Archbishop Carlo Maria Viganò, the former Apostolic Nuncio to the United States, as their Pope.

In a 2014 article in The New York Times about the UOGCC, Patriarch Elijah and his followers were alleged to be Pro-Russian, anti-Ukrainian, and violently opposed to the 2014 Ukrainian Revolution. In the same article, Kyr Ihor Vozniak, UGCC Archeparch of Lviv, was quoted as saying that the UOGCC is financed and secretly led by the Foreign Intelligence Service of the Russian Federation (SVR RF) (Russian: СВР РФ) to introduce anarchy and chaos into the Ukrainian Greek Catholic Church.

According to the Lviv-based newspaper Ekspres, Fr. Dohnal, alias Patriarch Elijah, was a KGB informer inside the Latin Diocese of Litoměřice before the Fall of Communism in the Czechoslovak Socialist Republic. In support of their claims, Ekspres published a document identifying Fr. Dohnal as a KGB mole with the code name "Tonek." The UOGCC denies the accusation.

=== Position on the 2022 Russian invasion of Ukraine ===
During the 2022 Russian invasion of Ukraine, the UGCC has promoted Ukrainian statehood and independence. It opened its churches and cathedrals for use as bomb shelters and warehouses. It has used its social organisations, such as Caritas Ukraine and Caritas-Spes, to provide humanitarian assistance. Several leading prelates, including Major Archbishop Sviatoslav Shevchuk, denounced the invasion and used their connections to the wider Catholic Church to gather support and provide information on the situation on the ground. Despite a few moments of tension between the leadership of the UGCC and Rome, namely over the inclusion of a Russian woman alongside a Ukrainian during the 2022 Good Friday Via Crucis, and the Pope's words regarding the assassination of Darya Dugina, Shevchuk often emphasised Francis' support for Ukraine during the war.

One of the major issues has been the targeting of the Church by Russian forces. Churches have been destroyed, and priests have had to evacuate sacred items to protect them from attacks. Additionally, Russian occupation authorities have banned the Ukrainian Greek Catholic Church and other Catholic ministries in the occupied regions of Ukraine, such as Zaporizhzhia. This includes organizations like the Knights of Columbus and Caritas. Church leaders have also been targeted for assassination. Major Archbishop Sviatoslav Shevchuk, head of the Ukrainian Greek Catholic Church, has had to move between safe houses to avoid threats. The ongoing conflict has led to significant damage and threats to the Ukrainian Greek Catholic Church and its members.

Historical documents from the Soviet era have also shed light on the suppression of the Ukrainian Greek Catholic Church. These documents reveal the extent of Soviet efforts to eradicate the Church's influence in western Ukraine during the 1940s. The fate of the Crimean Exarchate of the Ukrainian Greek Catholic Church after the Russian occupation of the Crimean Peninsula has been particularly challenging. The local branches of the Church were labeled as "agents of foreign influence" and accused of spreading seditious ideas such as "Ukrainian nationalism" and "separatism." This led to significant restrictions and threats to the Church's activities in the region.

Russian and pro-Russian militants in occupied territories have reportedly engaged in systematic persecution of non-Orthodox faiths, often under the guise of the Russian Orthodox Church. Incidents include the torture of detainees by individuals disguised as priests and the abduction of religious leaders such as Ihor Kozlovsky. These actions reflect a broader strategy of using religion to justify violence and exert control, tied to the Kremlin and Moscow Patriarchate's promotion of the "Russian World." Halya Coynash has criticized the Vatican for failing to address these abuses in its 2016 statement with Patriarch Kirill.

The persecution extends to Catholic communities in occupied Ukraine, where Russian forces have intensified their crackdown on the Ukrainian Greek Catholic Church (UGCC). According to the Institute for Religious Freedom, Russian militants have closed UGCC churches in the Donetsk region, barring worshippers from entering, and have seized church properties since early 2024. Clergy have been expelled from occupied territories, leaving the UGCC without any clergy in Donetsk, Luhansk, Kherson, and Zaporizhzhia. Two UGCC priests, Fathers Ivan Levitsky and Bohdan Geleta, were detained in Berdyansk in November 2022 and remain in harsh conditions in Russian custody, facing severe mistreatment, including torture.

In December 2022, Russian-installed authorities in Zaporizhzhia banned the UGCC and other Catholic groups, labeling them as extremist organizations. This aligns with a pattern of religious repression by Russian forces, who have reportedly damaged or destroyed over 660 religious sites since 2022. Archbishop Borys Gudziak noted that religious institutions in Russia function only if aligned with state policies, a practice now being enforced in occupied Ukrainian regions.

In a 2025 interview, Bishop Maksym Ryabukha, of the Archiepiscopal Exharchate of Donetsk told pontifical charity Aid to the Church in Need that "before the war we had over 80 parishes, and now we have only 37 active parishes. The rest were closed, occupied or destroyed." He went on to say that "the laws of the occupation force forbid any affiliation with the Catholic Church, either Greek-Catholic or Latin rite, and it is very difficult to provide any sort of ministry there. My exarchate no longer has any priests in these territories, all our churches have been destroyed, or they are closed and people are not allowed to attend them."

=== Calendar reform ===
On 24 December 2022, Major archbishop Sviatoslav handed over to Metropolitan Epiphanius of Kyiv for review a letter outlining the considerations of the UGCC hierarchs regarding the church calendar reform, which aims to replace the use of the old Julian calendar with the Revised Julian calendar. The primates decided to create a joint working group on specific proposals for calendar reform. The joint group is initiated on the occasion of the celebration of the 1700th anniversary of the First Ecumenical Council, held in Nicaea in 325. In this Council, in particular, the calendar principles of church life were determined.

On 1–2 February 2023 in Lviv-Briukhovychi, the Synod of Bishops of the UGCC decided that from 1 September 2023, the Ukrainian Greek Catholic Church in Ukraine will switch to a new style (Revised Julian calendar) for fixed holidays with the preservation of the current Paschalion, which was announced by Supreme Archbishop Sviatoslav on 6 February 2023. The calendar reform will have two stages. The first refers to all fixed holidays, and the second to the Easter date which would be kept in the old Julian. Parishes of the UGCC that are not ready to switch to the new style in 2023 have a transition period until 1 September 2025 to make the change.

On 6 February 2023, the Archeparchy of Przemyśl–Warsaw, taking into account the previous decision of the Ukrainian Greek Catholic Church in Ukraine and the opinion of the Delegates of the Joint Diocesan Council in Porszewice in June 2022, adopted a decree on the transition to the Revised Julian calendar from 1 September 2023.

On 22 March 2023, the Eparchy of Saints Peter and Paul of Melbourne, according to the decree of Bishop Mykola Bychok, decided that from 1 September 2023, the UGCC in Australia and Oceania will completely switch to the Gregorian calendar, including Easter.

According to the decree of Bishop Bohdan Dziurakh dated 22 April 2023, from 1 September 2023, the Ukrainian Catholic Apostolic Exarchate of Germany and Scandinavia completely switches to the Gregorian calendar, including Paschal, in contrast to the UGCC in Ukraine, in Poland.

On 9 June 2023, the Ukrainian Catholic Eparchy of the Holy Family of London, according to the decree of Bishop Kenneth Nowakowski, switches from 1 September 2023 to the Gregorian calendar, in particular with Easter.

== See also ==
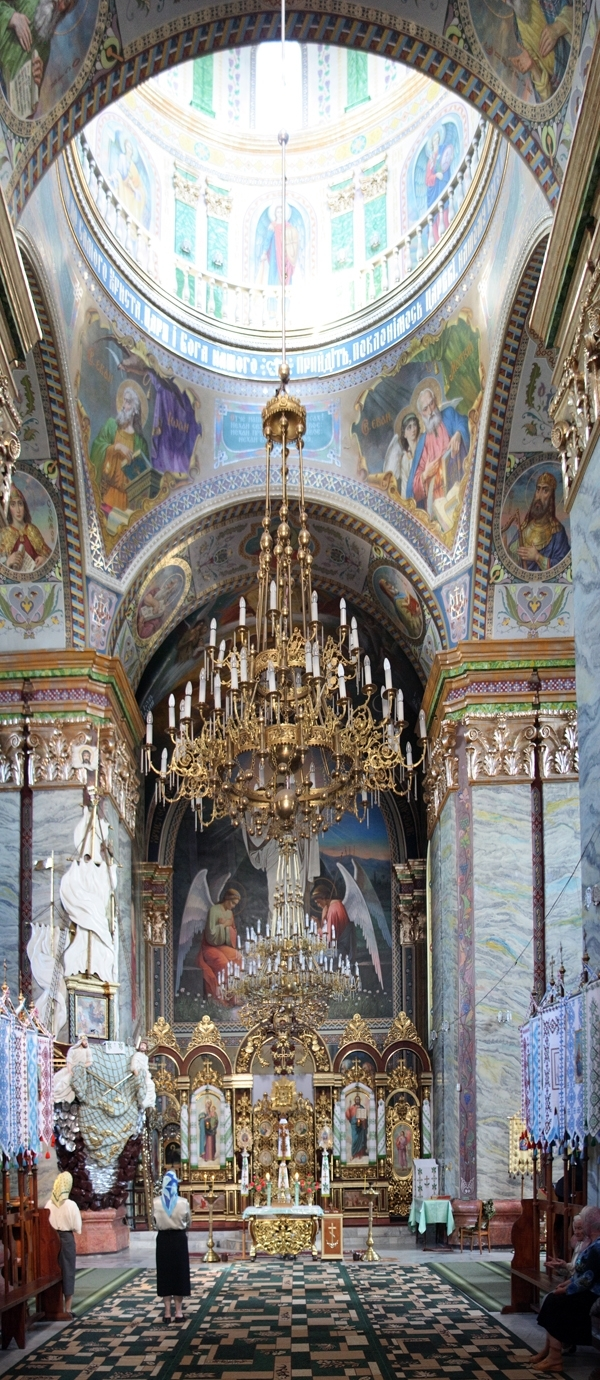
The interior of St. George's Church in Sheptytskyi

- Major events: Christianization of Kyivan Rus, Ruthenia, Conversion of Kholm Eparchy
- Western Ukrainian Clergy: List of major archbishops of Kyiv-Galicia and List of metropolitans and patriarchs of Kyiv, Andrey Sheptytsky, Yosyf Slipyi, Hryhoriy Khomyshyn, Josaphata Hordashevska
- List of eparchies of the Ukrainian Greek Catholic Church
- Dzhublyk
- Supporting organizations: Ukrainian Catholic University, Ukraine prison ministry, Priestly Society of Saint Josaphat
- Related organizations: Ruthenian Greek Catholic Church (Greek Catholic Eparchy of Mukachevo), Belarusian Greek Catholic Church
- Autocephaly of the Orthodox Church of Ukraine
- Prairie cathedral
