= Ukraine prison ministries =

Religious services for prisoners in Ukraine

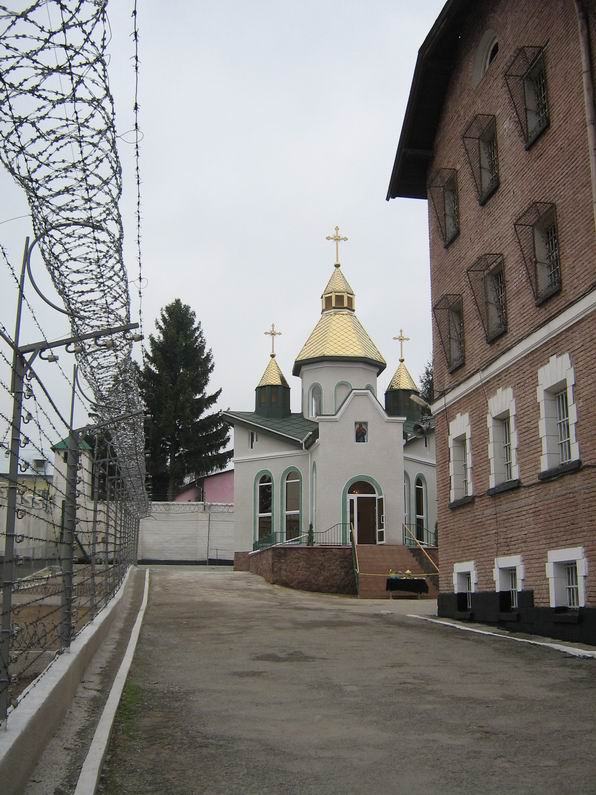
Chortkiv Remand Prison Chapel of St. John

The prison ministries of Ukraine provide religious services to people in Ukrainian prisons. Coordinated by religious leaders and the Ministry of Justice, services are provided for Ukrainian Greek Catholic, Roman Catholic, and Jewish prisoners.

== Prison system ==
The legal bases for the organization and activity of the prison system of Ukraine are outlined in the 2005 law titled "On State Criminal-Executive Service of Ukraine" (Ukrainian: Про Державну кримінально-виконавчу службу України). The law sets the service's structure: the executive authority (the State Criminal-Executive Service of Ukraine under the Ministry of Justice); the six regional bodies; and local penitentiary facilities, pre-trial prisons, and the probation system.

Symbol of the State Prison Service of Ukraine

Ukraine's prison system was the responsibility of the Ministry of Internal Affairs until 1998, when it became part of the newly-created State Penal Department.

In December 2010, it was reorganized as the State Penitentiary Service of Ukraine, directed by the Ministry of Justice, with responsibility for all persons within the prison system. As of January 2015, there were 177 penal institutions in Ukraine: 31 pre-trial detention prisons, 139 penal facilities, and six juvenile institutions.

In total, the penal institutions held 73,431 inmates, representing 162 prisoners per 100,000 people, a decrease from 347 per 100,000 people in July 2011. Approximately one-sixth of the prisoners are on remand, and 87,581 have non-custodial sentences. In February 2000, Ukraine abolished the death penalty, which had not been used since March 1997.

In March 2014, the Criminal Executive Service of Ukraine lost control of four prisons when Russia occupied and annexed Crimea. The functioning of 29 prisons in the militant-controlled areas of Donbas deteriorated after the 2014 Russian military intervention in Ukraine, with a lack of food and water affecting 16,200 inmates. In October 2014, insurgents agreed on a safe route for the evacuation of women from a destroyed prison in the Luhansk region. On 18 May, 2016, the Ministry of Justice of Ukraine abolished the State Penitentiary Service of Ukraine and took over responsibility for Ukraine's prisons.

== History ==
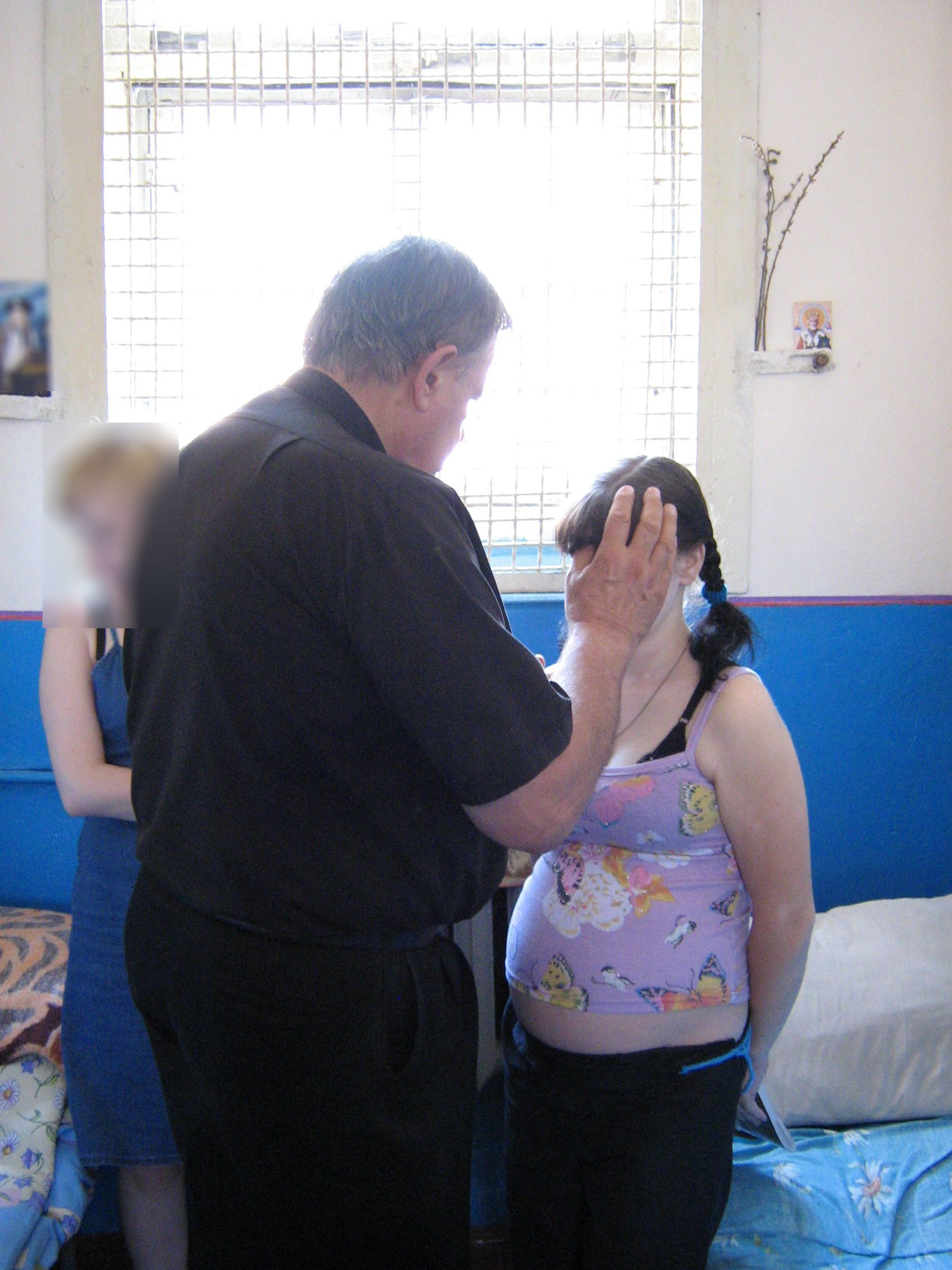
A chaplain blesses a pregnant inmate.

On 15 October 2007, the Interdenominational Mission of the Prison Ministry in Ukraine (IMPMU), a group consisting of 12 Christian denominations, met to create a seminar for prison missionaries in partnership with the State Department.

In November 2007, individuals from the Ukrainian Greek Catholic Church (UGCC) and the Roman Catholic Church of Ukraine (RCC) met to receive training and discuss possible improvements to prison ministry. In addition to church representatives, representatives were present from the State Department of Penitentiary of Ukraine, the United Nations, and the regional department of Rivne.

On 01 July 2008, the Ukrainian translation of the book Human Rights of Prisoners was issued. The English version of the book was published in 2006 in Rome under the aegis of the Pontifical Council for Justice and Peace and the International Commission of Catholic Prison Pastoral Care (ICCPPC). The Ukrainian translation of Human Rights of Prisoners was published on the 60th anniversary of the signing of the Universal Declaration of Human Rights.

Since 2011, chaplains have faced significant obstacles to visiting penal institutions. In particular, authorities required that priests who have Polish citizenship file a permit for each visit to an institution. These restrictions were introduced by President Viktor Yanukovych.

In 2015, President Petro Poroshenko signed a law regarding chaplaincy in prisons: "On the introduction of changes to some legislative acts of Ukraine regarding the regulation of the activities of clergymen (chaplains) in bodies and institutions belonging to the sphere of administration of the State Penitentiary Service of Ukraine" (Ukrainian: Про внесення змін до деяких законодавчих актів України щодо регулювання діяльності священнослужителів (капеланів) в органах та установах, що належать до сфери управління Державної пенітенціарної служби України).

In 2017, the Pastoral Council for Religious Care in Ukraine's Penitentiary, a "constantly operating interdenominational advisory body that works on a voluntary basis", began to work under the Ukrainian Ministry of Justice.

== Ukrainian Greek Catholic Church ==
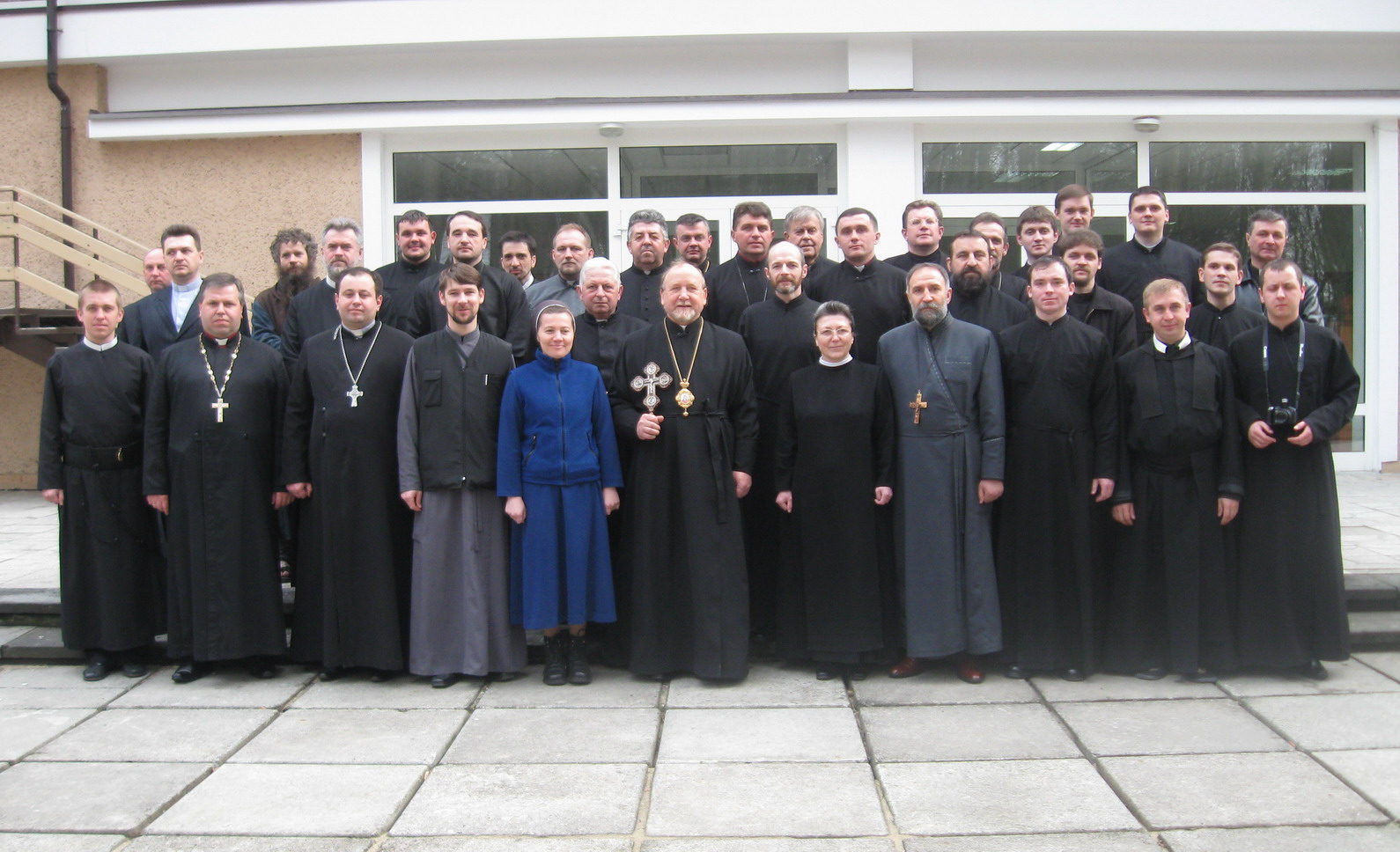
Chaplains of the UGCC, Ukraine, 2009

=== Structure and activities ===
The prison ministry of the Ukrainian Greek Catholic Church (UGCC) is carried out on the basis of "The Agreement for cooperation of the Ukrainian Greek-Catholic Church with the State Penitentiary Service of Ukraine". The patriarchal curia of the UGCC coordinates and promotes the common activity of the Church's structures, enables relations and cooperation with other churches and institutions, and practices ecumenical cooperation. The primary activities of the ministry are sermons, catechetics, administration of the sacraments for inmates, assistance and support of communication with family, spiritual support of the prison staff, and engagement of lay people in ministry.

The Synod of Bishops of the UGCC has defined the Sunday of the Prodigal Son as a "day of special attention" for its prison ministry, due to its focus on repentance and reconciliation. On 20 July, 2014, UGCC major archbishop Sviatoslav Shevchuk declared Vasyl Velychkovsky "patron of prison ministry for the Ukrainian Catholic Church".

Due to occupation in the Donetsk and Luhansk regions, some programming was suspended.

=== Development and history ===
The penitentiary pastoral ministry of the UGCC was restored in 1990 after the Church, which had been forbidden under the Soviet Union, emerged from the underground. Since 2001, the UGCC has been the co-founder of the Ukrainian Interdenominational Christian Mission "Spiritual and Charitable Care in Prisons," which includes twelve churches and denominations. This mission is a part of the World Association of Prison Ministry.

In 2006, UGCC major archbishop Lubomyr Husar established the Department for Pastoral Care in the Armed Forces and in the Penitentiary System of Ukraine. This structure implements a general management system for the Prison Ministry.In Rome in September 2007, the UGCC became an active member of the International Commission of Catholic Prison Pastoral Care (ICCPPC) at the XII World Congress. The ICCPPC is a worldwide association of country delegates for Catholic prison pastoral care, composed of clerical and lay persons. At this Congress, the Church expressed concern about imprisoned persons held in inhumane conditions, especially minors, women, old, and mentally ill persons, and those who only came on trial and their guilt was not proven.

In November 2007, a training program for UGCC prison chaplains called "Pastoral care at the penitentiary institutions of Ukraine" was held at the Professional College of the State Penal Department in Bila Tserkva. From February to May 2008, this common educational program was spread out for other Christian denominations.

On 8 February, 2008, the UGCC presented the Ukrainian publication of the Compendium of Catholic social teaching for the State Penal Department of Ukraine. On 8 June, 2008, the UGCC and Penitentiary Service of Ukraine carried out the First Pilgrimage to Zarvanytsia, a sacred place of the Blessed Virgin Mary. The employees of the Central Administration of the Penal Department, chiefs of all Regional Management Units of the Penal System, chiefs and assistant chiefs of 183 prison facilities in Ukraine, and clergy of different churches took part in this pilgrimage. The total number of pilgrims was more than 350. The pilgrimage was carried out with the intention to deepen the understanding of vocation to the prison service and to comprehend the teachings of the church about challenges concerning crime, sin, penance, pardon, change of life, and cherishment of human dignity.

The International Conference "Area Juridica of Prison Ministry" took place in Kyiv on 6 June, 2009, at the initiative of the ICCPPC-Europe. The conference was organized in cooperation between the UGCC and the State Penal Department of Ukraine. Participants examined the status of legislation in European countries for the safeguarding of human dignity in prisons. The conference analyzed the status of criminal justice in Central and Eastern Europe and the human rights of prisoners and convicts. Members of the working group of the ICCPPC-Europe were invited to the conference as representatives of churches ministering in prisons in Ukraine. Vice-president of PFI Soren Johnson and head chaplain of Russia Alexander Dobrodiejev participated in this event.

In December 2009, the Commission of the Kyiv Archdiocese for Penitentiary Pastoral Care was founded by major archbishop Lubomir Husar.

In April 2010, Dr. Christian Kuhn, President of the ICCPPC, represented the position of the Catholic Pastoral Ministry on the religious rights of prisoners at the 12th United Nations Congress on Crime Prevention and Criminal Justice, which took place in Salvador, Brazil.

The issues of the ministry in prison were the subject of three sessions of the Synod of Bishops of the UGCC in 2010.

On 12 December, 2012, UGCC major archbishop Sviatoslav Shevchuk and Alexander Lisitskov, head of the State Penitentiary Service of Ukraine (SPSU), signed an agreement of cooperation. The agreement is a reflection of cooperation according to the previous document signed by Lubomir Husar in 2007. The text of the agreement summarizes the structural changes that have occurred over the past 5 years and emphasizes the importance of pastoral care for SPSU staff and their families, students of SPSU educational institutions, and prisoners and other persons detained. Also in December 2012, the manual To minister prisoners was published, written by Sergey Zamula, Yuri Cousio, Jaroslav Storonyak, Igor Car, Basil Pantelyuk, Emelyan Kolodchak, and Constantine Pantelei.

In July through August 2013, representatives of the UGCC took part in an interdenominational group for the development of proposals for a draft law related to chaplaincy in SPSU institutions, titled "Draft Law on Amendments to Certain Legislative Acts of Ukraine (regarding the regulation of the activities of chaplains in bodies and institutions belonging to the sphere of administration of the State Penitentiary Service of Ukraine)" (Ukrainian: Проект Закону про внесення змін до деяких законодавчих актів України (щодо регулювання діяльності капеланів в органах та установах, що належать до сфери управління Державної пенітенціарної служби України)).

== Roman Catholic Church ==
RCC in Ukraine is a member of the Ukrainian Interdenominational Christian Mission "Spiritual and Charitable Care in Prisons". Grzegorz Draus is the head chaplain of the Roman Catholic prison ministry in Ukraine. Since September 2000, Draus has worked in two penal institutions. Draus was the board chairperson of the Ukrainian Interdenominational Christian Mission from 2007 to 2011.

The Roman Catholic Church in Ukraine provides occasional services in six prisons, and regular pastoral care in 11 prisons:

- Lviv-Remand Prison and Prison Facility
- Rivne Detention Center and Prison of Horodyshche
- High-security prison of Izaslav
- Raykivtsi (Khmelnytsky region)
- Prison of Kharkiv
- Prison of Vinnitsa
- Prison of Sumy
- Prison of Poltava
- Prison of Odesa

With the participation of the Archbishop of Lviv, the Roman Catholic Archdiocese of Lviv organized a special event in prison in the Year of Extraordinary Jubilee of Mercy.

== Judaism ==
As of 2023, the official rabbi of the prison ministry is Jonathan Markovitch, an emissary of Chabad. While Markovitch is responsible for the administration of religious services, "Jewish activities" are managed by his son, Ariel Markovitch, who is also a rabbi.

== See also ==
- Prison religion
