= Stepan Sus =

Ukrainian Greek Catholic bishop

- Titular Bishop of Zygris, Curial Bishop of Major Archeparchy of Kyiv–Galicia
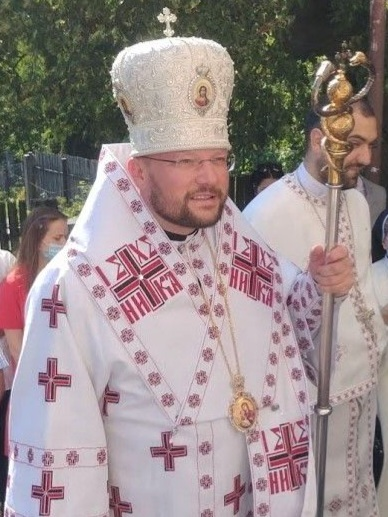
- Church: Ukrainian Greek Catholic Church
- Appointed: 15 November 2019
- Other posts: Parish priest of Sts Peter and Paul Garrison Church in Lviv (2011–2019) Order of Merit (3rd class)

Orders
- Ordination: 30 June 2006 (Priest) by Ihor Vozniak
- Consecration: 12 January 2020 (Bishop) by Sviatoslav Shevchuk

Personal details
- Born: Stepan Yaroslavovych Sus; 7 October 1981 (age 44) Lviv, Ukrainian SSR
- Denomination: Ukrainian Greek Catholic
- Motto: Ukrainian: Бог багатий милосердям God, who is rich in mercy
- Coat of arms

Bishop Stepan Sus (Ukrainian: Степан Сус; born 7 October 1981) is a Ukrainian Greek Catholic hierarch as Titular Bishop of Zygris and Curial Bishop of Ukrainian Catholic Major Archeparchy of Kyiv–Galicia since 15 November 2019.

== Life ==
Bishop Sus was born in family of Yaroslav and Oksana (née Bodnar) Sus in Lviv, but grew up in the neighbouring village Chyshky in Pustomyty Raion. After graduation of the school education in Chyshky and the historical-philosophical lyceum run by the Order of Saint Basil the Great in Buchach, he joined the Theological Seminary in Lviv, simultaneously studying in the Ukrainian Catholic University (1999–2006). After graduation he was ordained as priest on 30 June 2006.

He continued his study in the University of Lviv with magister in the philosophy degree and in the Catholic University of Lublin with magister in the pastoral theology degree. During 2006–2011 he worked as a military chaplain in Lviv and from 2011 until his bishop's appointment in 2019 was parish priest in the Saints Peter and Paul Garrison Church in Lviv.

On 15 November 2019 he was confirmed by Pope Francis as Curial Bishop of Ukrainian Catholic Major Archeparchy of Kyiv–Galicia, Ukraine and Titular Bishop of Zygris. He was consecrated as bishop by Major Archbishop Sviatoslav Shevchuk and other hierarchs of the Ukrainian Greek Catholic Church in the Cathedral of the Resurrection of Christ in Kyiv on 12 January 2020.

Catholic Church titles
Preceded by Michel Hrynchyshyn	Titular Bishop of Zygris; 2019–	Succeeded by Incumbent
