= Mariusz Dmyterko =

Polish Greek Catholic bishop (born 1979)

Mariusz Tomasz Dmyterko
- Titular Bishop of Tzernicus, Auxiliary Bishop of Wrocław–Koszalin
- Church: Ukrainian Greek Catholic Church
- Appointed: 10 July 2025
- Previous post: Parish priest in Biały Bór (2016–2025)

Orders
- Ordination: 20 August 2005 (Priest) by Włodzimierz Juszczak
- Consecration: 13 September 2025 (Bishop) by Sviatoslav Shevchuk

Personal details
- Born: Mariusz Tomasz Dmyterko; 29 December 1979 (age 46) Bytów, Poland
- Education: Catholic University of Lublin, University of Opole, Pontifical Gregorian University

Bishop Mariusz Tomasz Dmyterko (Ukrainian: Маріуш Тома Дмитерко; born 29 December 1979) is a Polish Ukrainian Greek Catholic hierarch, who is serving as a Titular Bishop of Tzernicus and an Auxiliary Bishop of Eparchy of Wrocław–Koszalin since 10 July 2025.

== Early life and education ==
Dmyterko was born into the large family of farmers Mykhailo and Olha in Bytów. He has four brothers: Andrzej, Dariusz, Borisław and Michał. After graduation of the school education, he attended the Major Theological Seminary in Lublin, simultaneously studying in the John Paul II Catholic University of Lublin (1999–2005). He later studied at the Faculty of Theology at the University of Opole and in 2016 he received a Doctor of Theology degree at the Pontifical Gregorian University in Rome, Italy.

== Pastoral work ==
He was ordained as priest on 20 August 2005 in Biały Bór for the Ukrainian Catholic Eparchy of Wrocław-Gdańsk by eparchial bishop Włodzimierz Juszczak and appointed assistant priest in the parish of Legnica, where he where he also taught Greek Catholic catechism in local schools in Legnica, Rosochata, Dąbie and Wągrodno (2005–2010)

In 2016, after returning from Rome, Dmyterko became the parish priest in Biały Bór, Bielica and Międzybórz. He was a member of the priestly council of the Eparchy (2019–2025) and appointed an Eparchial Censor, responsible for the dogmatic correctness of doctrine and liturgical literature in 2021.

== Bishop ==
On 10 July 2025, Dmyterko was appointed by Pope Leo XIV as a Titular Bishop of Tzernicus and an Auxiliary Bishop of Eparchy of Wrocław–Koszalin.

His consecration to the episcopate took place on 13 September 2025 in the Exaltation of the Holy Cross Cathedral in Wrocław. The principal consecrator was a Major Archbishop Sviatoslav Shevchuk, the Head of the Ukrainian Greek Catholic Church with other hierarchs of the Ukrainian Greek Catholic Church.

Catholic Church titles
Preceded by Jožef Smej	Titular Bishop of Tzernicus; 2025–present	Incumbent
