= Golanka Dolna =

- Village
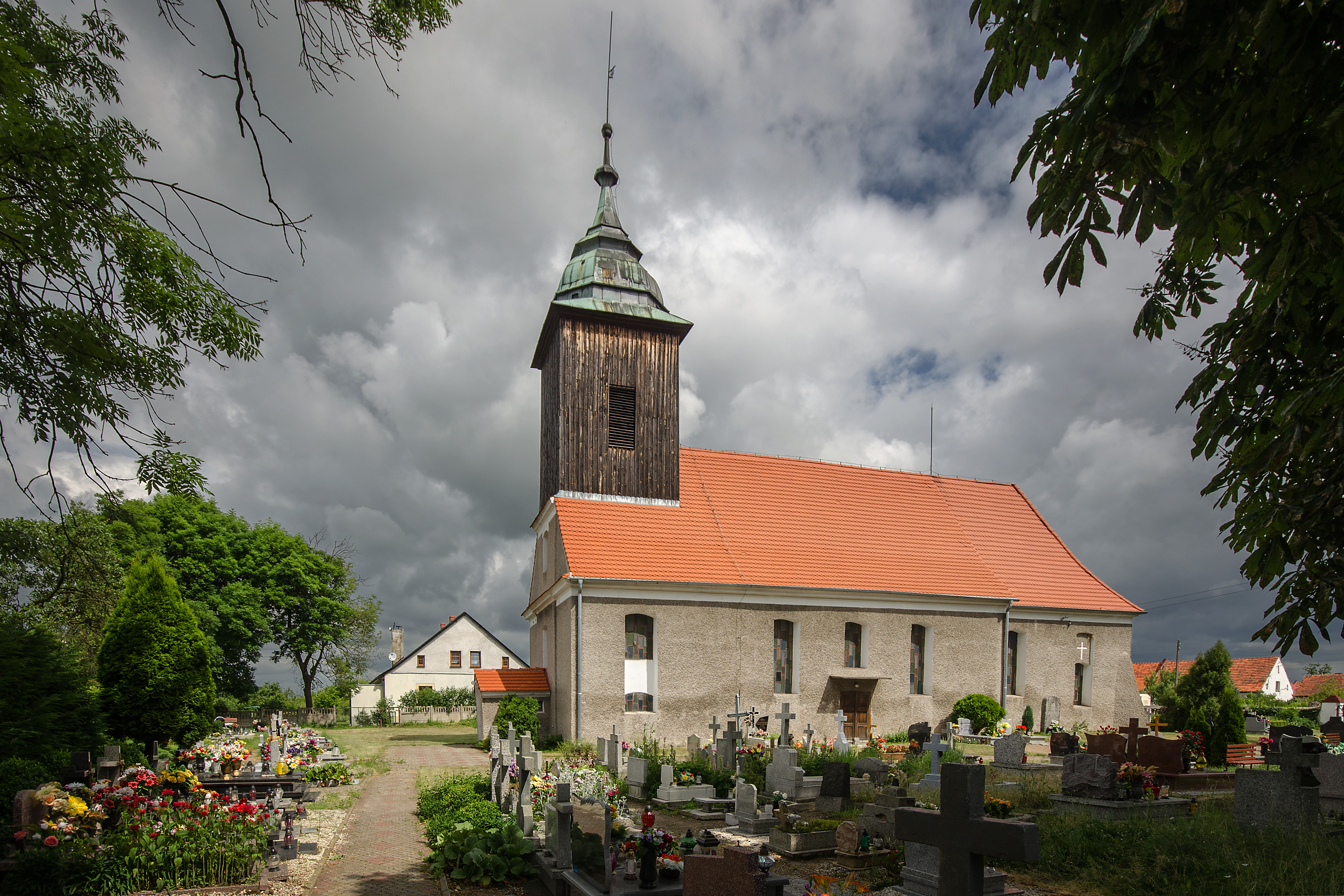
- Catholic church

- Location within Poland
- Coordinates: 51°15′20″N 16°19′09″E
- Country: Poland
- Voivodeship: Lower Silesian
- County: Legnica
- Gmina: Prochowice

Golanka Dolna [ɡɔˈlanka ˈdɔlna] is a village in the administrative district of Gmina Prochowice, within Legnica County, Lower Silesian Voivodeship, in south-western Poland.

It lies approximately 4 kilometres (2 mi) south-west of Prochowice, 12 kilometres (7 mi) east of Legnica, and 53 kilometres (33 mi) west of the regional capital Wrocław.

== History ==
Until 1945, Golanka Dólna was German and was named Nieder-Heidau. It belonged to the Lower Silesian Liegnitz District in the Province of Silesia, Kingdom of Prussia, German Empire.

== See also ==
- Golanka Górna
- Hajduki Nyskie
