= Cichobórz =

Cichobórz may refer to the following places in Poland:

- Cichobórz, Lower Silesian Voivodeship (south-west Poland)
- Cichobórz, Lublin Voivodeship (east Poland)
