= Teodor Majkowicz =

- Ukrainian Catholic Eparchy of Wrocław-Gdańsk
- Church: Ukrainian Greek Catholic Church
- In office: 12 July 1996 – 9 May 1998
- Predecessor: New creation
- Successor: Włodzimierz Juszczak

Orders
- Ordination: 24 June 1956 (Priest) by Marian Jankowski
- Consecration: 12 July 1996 (Bishop) by Myroslav Marusyn

Personal details
- Born: Teodor Majkowicz; 6 January 1932 Rzepedź, Second Polish Republic
- Died: 9 May 1998 (aged 66) Kraków, Poland

Teodor Majkowicz (Ukrainian: Теодор Майкович; 6 January 1932 – 9 May 1998) was a Ukrainian Greek Catholic hierarch in Poland. He was the first Eparchial Bishop of the new created Ukrainian Catholic Eparchy of Wrocław-Gdańsk bishop from 1996 to 1998.

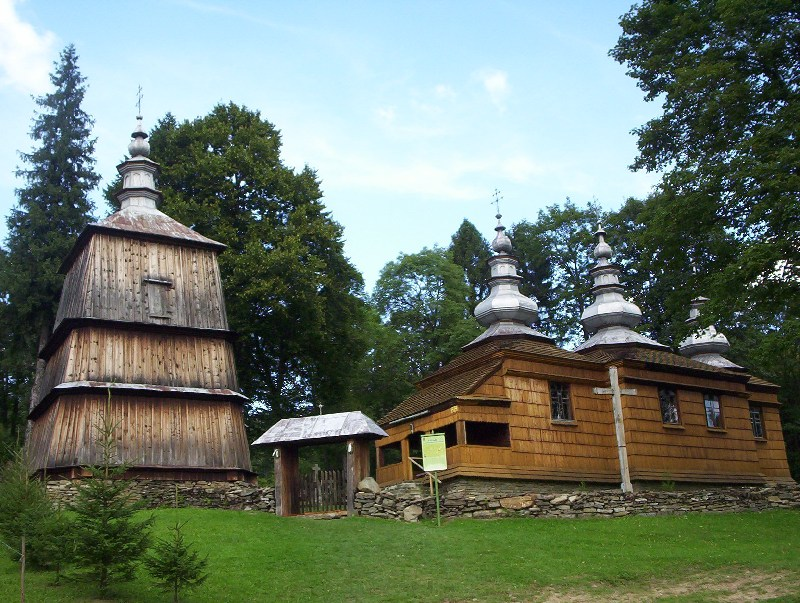
St. Nicholas Church in the native village of Bishop Teodor Majkowicz Rzepedź, where he is buried in the churchyard cemetery

== Life ==
Born in Rzepedź, Second Polish Republic in the Ukrainian family of Ivan and Mariya Harhaj in 1932 and in 1947, together with family, was forced resettlement after Operation Vistula. He was ordained a priest on 24 June 1956 by Roman Catholic Bishop Marian Jankowski. He worked as a Roman Catholic priest, but in 1960th begun to help in the renewed Greek Catholic parishes.

He was appointed by the Holy See an Eparchial Bishop of the new created Ukrainian Catholic Eparchy of Wrocław-Gdańsk on 24 May 1996. He was consecrated to the Episcopate on 12 July 1996. The principal consecrator was Archbishop Myroslav Marusyn, and the principal co-consecrators were Archbishop Jan Martyniak and Bishop Julian Gbur in Cathedral of St. John the Baptist, Przemyśl.

He died of a heart attack in Kraków on 9 May 1998.

Catholic Church titles
New title	Ukrainian Catholic Eparchy of Wrocław-Gdańsk; 1996–1998	Succeeded by Włodzimierz Juszczak
