= Arkadiusz Trochanowski =

- Eparchial Bishop of Ukrainian Catholic Eparchy of Olsztyn–Gdańsk
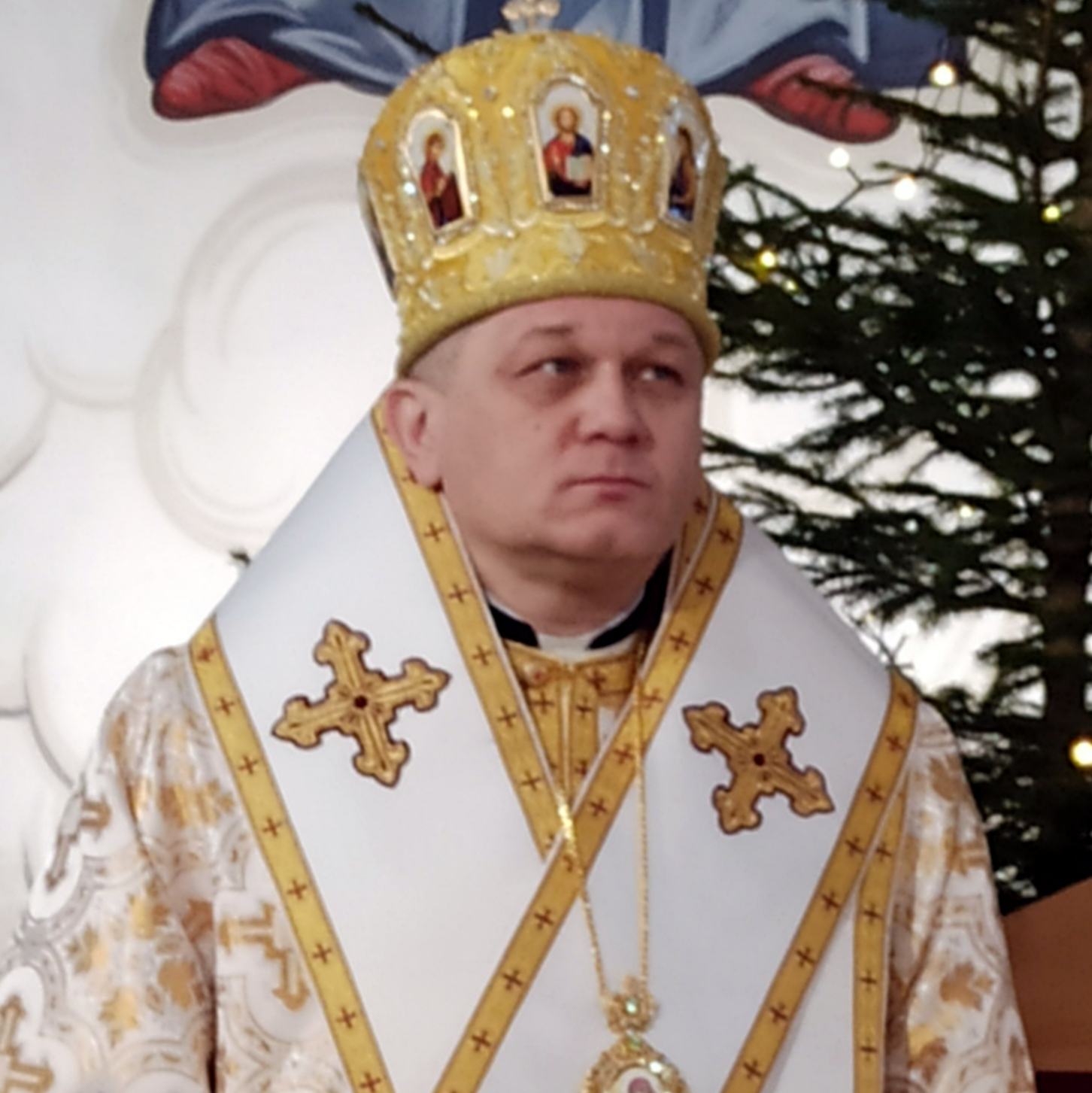
- Church: Ukrainian Greek Catholic Church
- Appointed: 25 November 2020
- Predecessor: New creation
- Successor: Incumbent
- Previous posts: Parish priest in Wałcz (2001–2020) and Szczecinek (2001–2016)

Orders
- Ordination: 29 June 2000 (Priest) by Włodzimierz Juszczak
- Consecration: 23 January 2021 (Bishop) by Sviatoslav Shevchuk

Personal details
- Born: Arkadiusz Trochanowski; 6 January 1973 (age 53) Szprotawa, Poland
- Education: Catholic University of Lublin, University of Wrocław, Adam Mickiewicz University in Poznań
- Coat of arms

Bishop Arkadiusz Trochanowski (Ukrainian: Аркадій Трохановський; born 6 January 1973) is a Polish Ukrainian Greek Catholic hierarch as the first eparchial bishop of the newly created Ukrainian Catholic Eparchy of Olsztyn–Gdańsk since 25 November 2020.

== Early life and education ==
Trochanowski was born into the Greek-Catholic family of Jan and Olga Trochanowski in the Lubusz Voivodeship. His parents were forcibly resettled with other Ukrainians in Poland, from ethnic Ukrainian territories to the Recovered Territories in western Poland during Operation Vistula in 1947. After graduation of the school education in his native Szprotawa, he attended the Major Theological Seminary in Lublin, simultaneously studying in the John Paul II Catholic University of Lublin (1994–2000). He studied at the Pontifical Faculty of Theology at the University of Wrocław and in 2012 he received a Doctor of Theology degree in ecumenism from the Faculty of Theology of the University of Adam Mickiewicz in Poznań.

== Pastoral work ==
He was ordained as priest on 29 July 2000 in Wrocław for the Ukrainian Catholic Eparchy of Wrocław-Gdańsk by eparchial bishop Włodzimierz Juszczak and appointed assistant priest in the parishes of Wrocław, Środa Śląska, Oława and Oleśnica (2000–2001)

In 2001 Trochanowski became the parish priest in Wałcz, where he served until 2020 and from 2001–2016 he was also the parish priest in Szczecinek. He was a member of the priestly council of the Eparchy (2006–2020), dean of Koszalin deanery (2010–2020) and Chairman of the Eparchial Commission for children and youth (2006–2020).

== Bishop ==
On 25 November 2020, with the creation of the new ecclesiastical circumscription in Poland, Trochanowski was appointed by Pope Francis as the first Eparchial Bishop of the Ukrainian Catholic Eparchy of Olsztyn–Gdańsk.

His consecration to the episcopate took place on 23 January 2021 in the Protection of the Mother of God Cathedral in Olsztyn. The principal consecrator was Major Archbishop Sviatoslav Shevchuk, the Head of the Ukrainian Greek Catholic Church with other hierarchs of the Ukrainian Greek Catholic Church.

Catholic Church titles
New title	Eparchial Bishop of Olsztyn–Gdańsk; 2020–present	Incumbent
