= Szczedrzykowice =

- Village
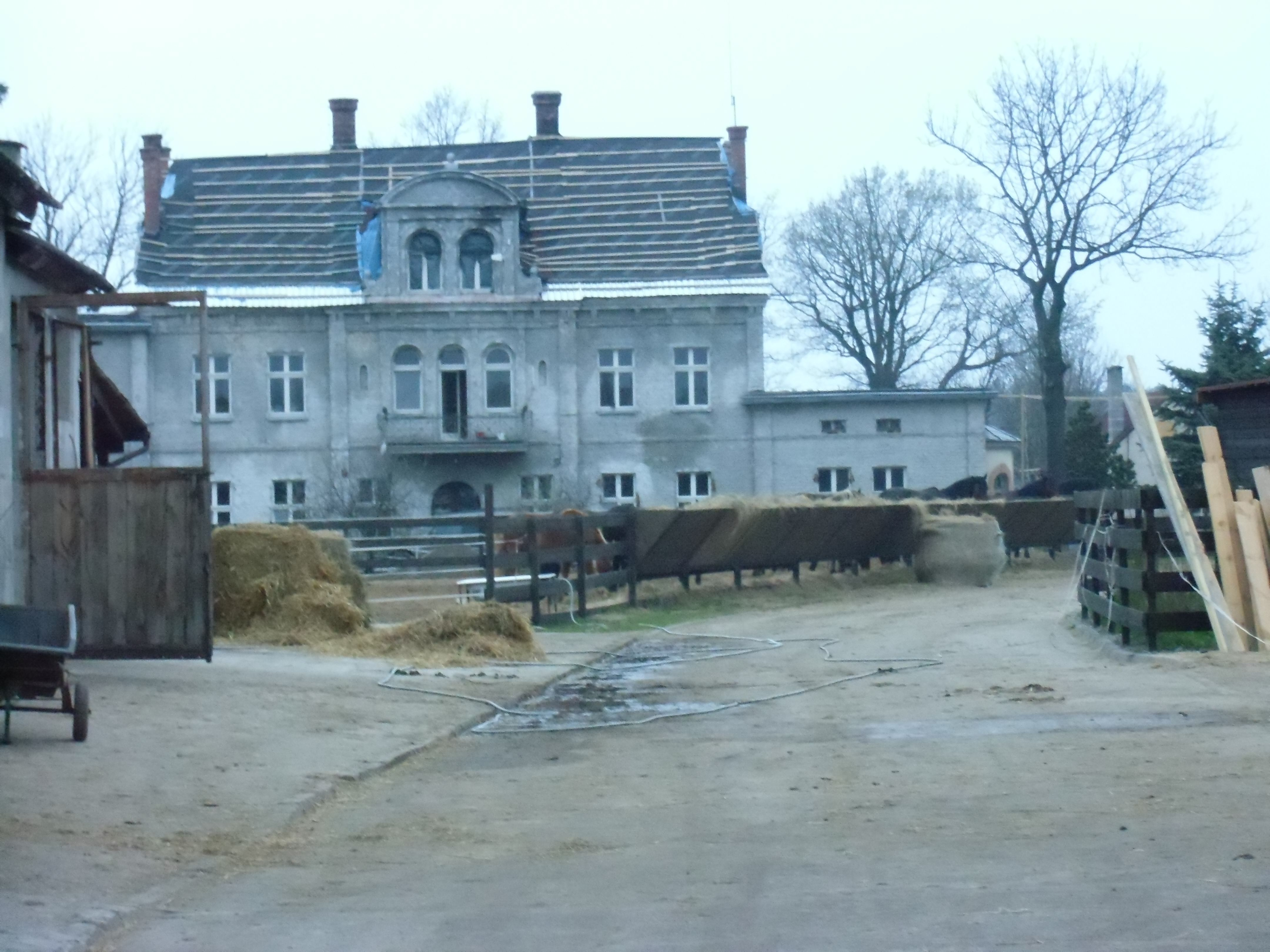

- Location within Poland
- Coordinates: 51°13′46″N 16°20′59″E
- Country: Poland
- Voivodeship: Lower Silesian
- County: Legnica
- Gmina: Prochowice

Szczedrzykowice [ʂt͡ʂɛdʐɨkɔˈvit͡sɛ] is a village in the administrative district of Gmina Prochowice, within Legnica County, Lower Silesian Voivodeship, in south-western Poland.

The village is served by nearby Szczedrzykowice railway station, located in Szczedrzykowice-Stacja, part of Szczedrzykowice.
