= Eugeniusz Popowicz =

Polish Greek Catholic archbishop

- Archbishop-Metropolitan of Ukrainian Catholic Archeparchy of Przemyśl–Warsaw
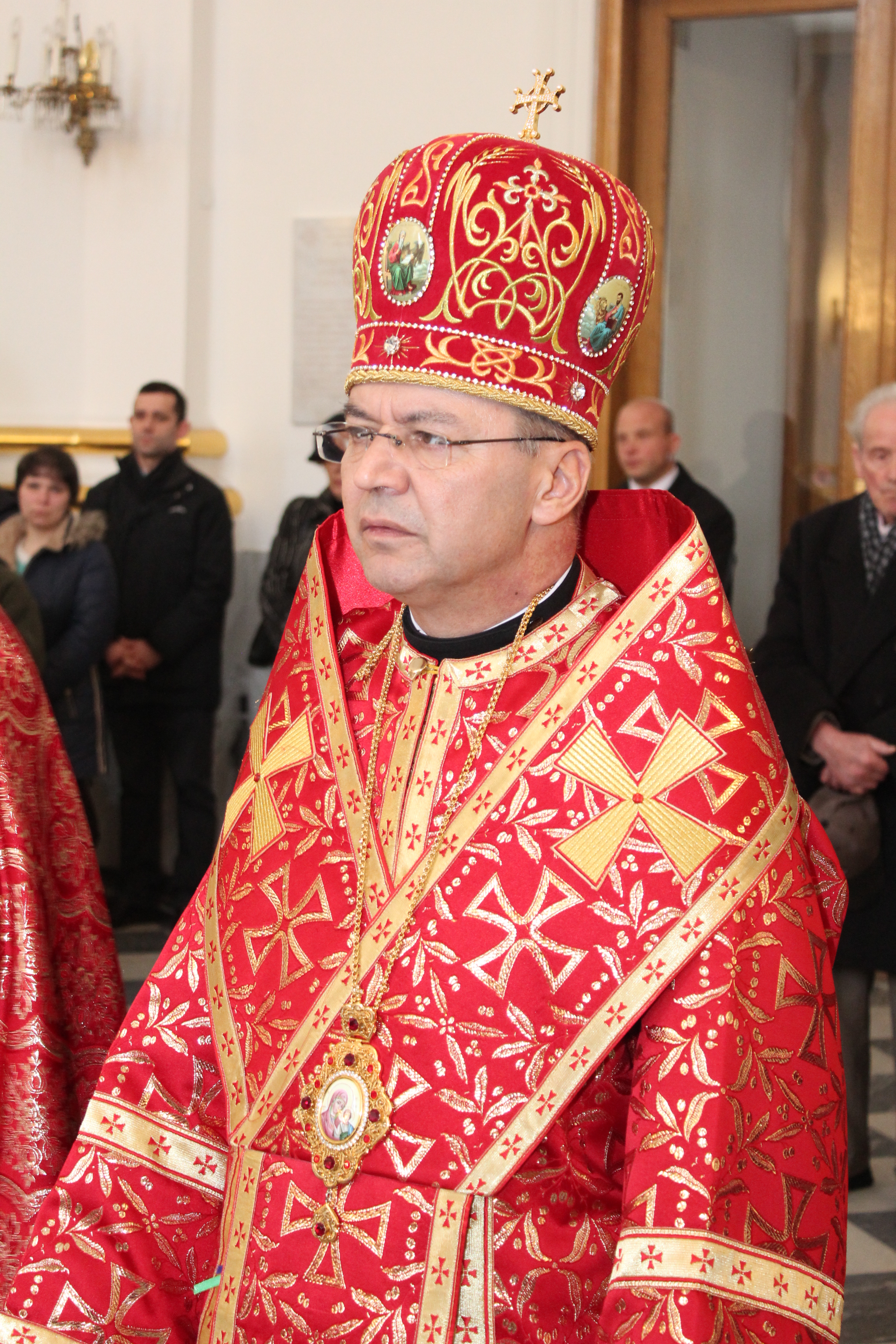
- Church: Ukrainian Greek Catholic Church
- Appointed: 7 November 2015
- Predecessor: Jan Martyniak
- Successor: Incumbent
- Other post: Apostolic Administrator of the Eparchy of Olsztyn–Gdańsk (2020–2021)
- Previous posts: Protosyncellus of the Archeparchy of Przemyśl–Warsaw (1996–2015); Titular Bishop of Horrea Coelia (2013–2015); Auxiliary Bishop of Przemyśl–Warsaw (2013–2015)

Orders
- Ordination: 17 October 1986 (Priest) by Myroslav Marusyn
- Consecration: 21 December 2013 (Bishop) by Sviatoslav Shevchuk

Personal details
- Born: Eugeniusz Mirosław Popowicz; 12 October 1961 (age 64) Człuchów, Koszalin Voivodeship, Poland
- Coat of arms

Archbishop Eugeniusz Mirosław Popowicz (Ukrainian: Євген Мирослав Попович; born 12 October 1961) is a Polish Ukrainian Greek Catholic hierarch as an archbishop-metropolitan of Ukrainian Catholic Archeparchy of Przemyśl–Warsaw since 7 November 2015. Also he served as an apostolic administrator of the newly created Ukrainian Catholic Eparchy of Olsztyn–Gdańsk since 25 November 2020 until 23 January 2021. Previously he served as a titular bishop of Horrea Coelia and auxiliary bishop of Przemyśl–Warsaw from 4 November 2013 until 7 November 2015.

== Early life and pastoral work ==
Popowicz was born in the family of Greek-Catholics in the present day Pomeranian Voivodeship. After graduation of the school education he joined Higher Theological Seminary in Lublin with degree in theology. After this he was ordained by Archbishop Myroslav Marusyn as deacon on 14 October 1986 and as priest on 17 October 1986 for the Ukrainian Catholic Eparchy of Przemyśl. Following two years pastoral work, Popowicz continued his studies in the Pontifical Oriental Institute in Rome to secure a Doctor of Canon Law degree. Then, after short time of the professor work in the Theological Seminary in Lviv, Ukraine, he returned in Poland, where continued to serve in the different parishes. In 1996 he was appointed as protosyncellus of the Archeparchy.

== Bishop ==
On 4 November 2013 Popowicz was appointed and on 21 December 2013 was consecrated to the Episcopate as the auxiliary bishop of the Ukrainian Catholic Archeparchy of Przemyśl–Warsaw. The principal consecrator was Major Archbishop Sviatoslav Shevchuk, the head of the Ukrainian Greek Catholic Church.

On 7 November 2015, after retirement of his predecessor, Archbishop Jan Martyniak, Popowicz was appointed and on 19 December 2015 was enthroned as the Metropolitan Archbishop of the Ukrainian Catholic Archeparchy of Przemyśl–Warsaw. He has been editor of the diocesan publication Przemyskich Archidiecezjalnych Wiadomości.

Catholic Church titles
Preceded by Luis Armando Tineo Rivera	Titular Bishop of Horrea Coelia; 2013–2015	Succeeded by Duncan Theodore Tsoke
Preceded by Jan Martyniak	Metropolitan Archbishop of Przemyśl–Warsaw; 2015–present	Succeeded by Incumbent
New title	Apostolic Administrator of the Eparchy of Olsztyn–Gdańsk; 2020–2021	Succeeded by Arkadiusz Trochanowski (as Eparchial Bishop)
