= Motyczyn =

- Village
- Location within Poland
- Coordinates: 51°14′43″N 16°21′48″E
- Country: Poland
- Voivodeship: Lower Silesian
- County: Legnica
- Gmina: Prochowice

Motyczyn [mɔˈtɨt͡ʂɨn] is a village in the administrative district of Gmina Prochowice, within Legnica County, Lower Silesian Voivodeship, in south-western Poland.
