= Gmina Prochowice =

Gmina Prochowice Prochowice Commune
- Gmina
- Flag Coat of arms
- Interactive map of Gmina Prochowice
- Coordinates (Prochowice): 51°16′27″N 16°21′54″E
- Country: Poland
- Voivodeship: Lower Silesian
- County: Legnica
- Seat: Prochowice
- Sołectwos: Cichobórz, Dąbie, Golanka Dolna, Gromadzyń, Kawice, Kwiatkowice, Lisowice, Mierzowice, Motyczyn, Rogów Legnicki, Szczedrzykowice, Szczedrzykowice-Stacja

Area
  - Total: 102.62 km^{2} (39.62 sq mi)

Population (2019-06-30)
  - Total: 7,450
  - Density: 72.6/km^{2} (188/sq mi)
- Website: http://www.prochowice.com

Gmina Prochowice is an urban-rural gmina (administrative district) in Legnica County, Lower Silesian Voivodeship, in south-western Poland. Its seat is the town of Prochowice, which lies approximately 16 kilometres (10 mi) north-east of Legnica, and 50 kilometres (31 mi) west of the regional capital Wrocław.

The gmina covers an area of 102.62 square kilometres (39.6 sq mi), and as of 2019 its total population was 7,450.

== Neighbouring gminas ==
Gmina Prochowice is bordered by the gminas of Kunice, Lubin, Malczyce, Ruja, Ścinawa and Wołów.

== Villages ==
Apart from the town of Prochowice, the gmina contains the villages of Cichobórz, Dąbie, Golanka Dolna, Gromadzyń, Kawice, Kwiatkowice, Lisowice, Mierzowice, Motyczyn, Rogów Legnicki, Szczedrzykowice and Szczedrzykowice-Stacja.

== Twin towns – sister cities ==
Gmina Prochowice is twinned with:

- Warburg, Germany
