= Mierzowice =

- Village
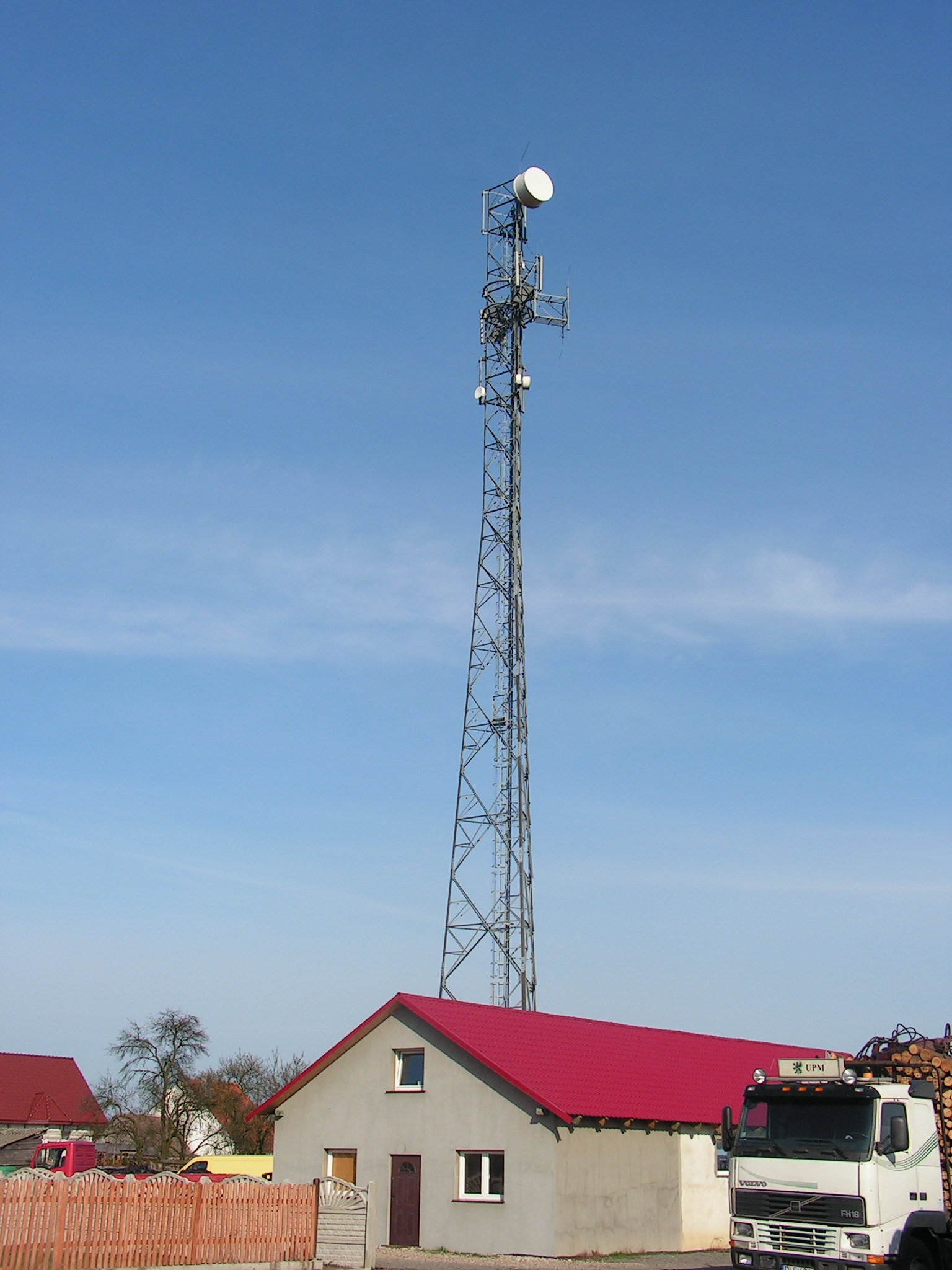

- Location within Poland
- Coordinates: 51°18′N 16°21′E
- Country: Poland
- Voivodeship: Lower Silesian
- County: Legnica
- Gmina: Prochowice

Mierzowice [mjɛʐɔˈvit͡sɛ] is a village in the administrative district of Gmina Prochowice, within Legnica County, Lower Silesian Voivodeship, in south-western Poland.
