= St Dorothea Church, Wrocław =

Church of Sts. Dorothea, Stanislaus, and Wenceslaus
- Kościół św. Doroty, św. Stanisława i św. Wacława
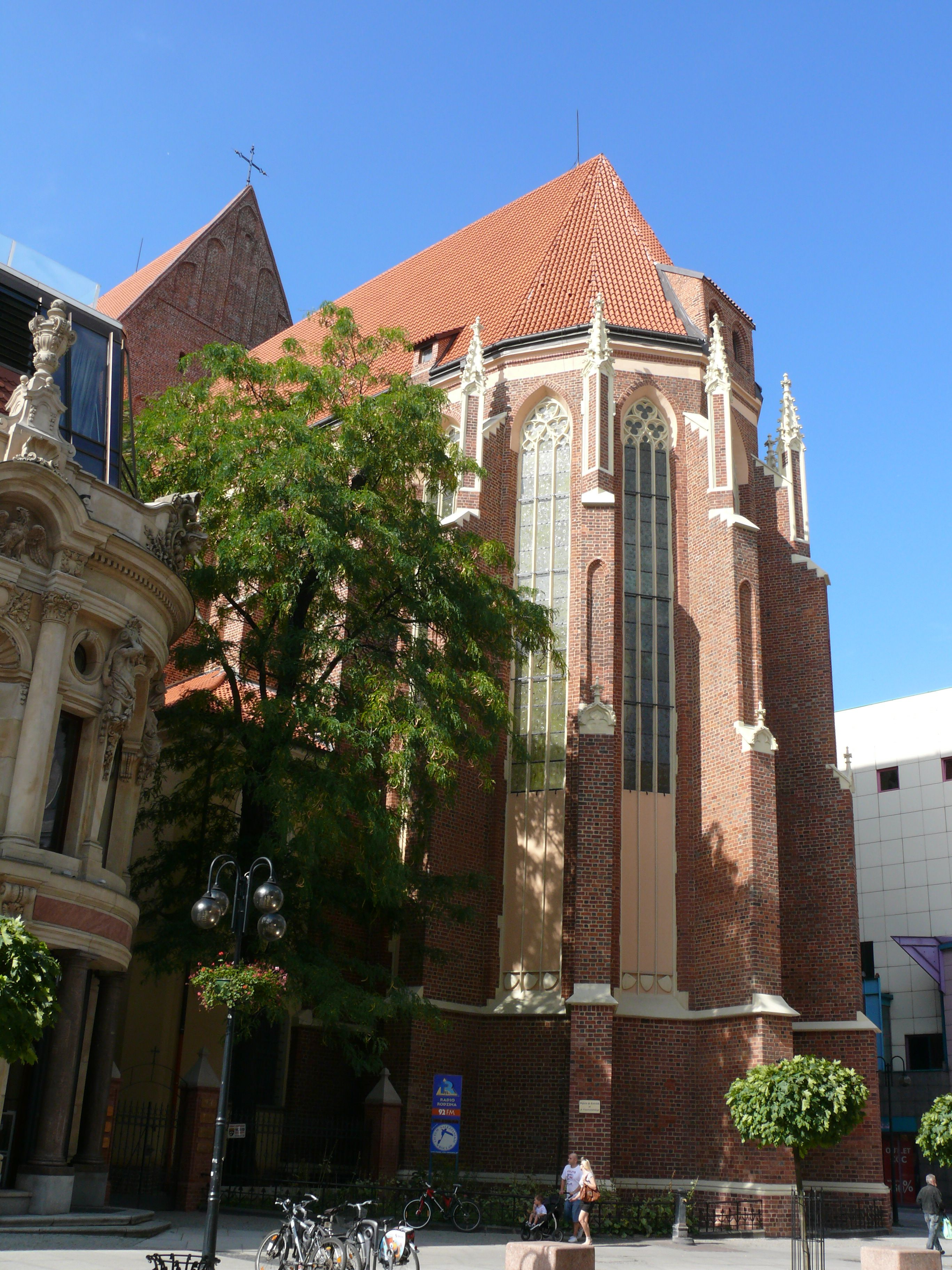

- 51°06′23″N 17°01′50″E
- Location: Wrocław
- Country: Poland
- Language: Polish
- Denomination: Catholic

History
- Status: Parish church
- Founded: 1351
- Dedication: Dorothea of Caesarea, Stanislaus of Szczepanów, Wenceslaus I

Architecture
- Functional status: Active
- Heritage designation: Historic Monument of Poland
- Designated: 8 September 1994
- Style: Gothic
- Completed: 1401

Administration
- Archdiocese: Wrocław

The Church of Sts. Dorothea, Wenceslaus, and Stanislaus (Polish: Kościół św. Stanisława, św. Doroty i św. Wacława, German: St. Dorotheenkirche) is a Gothic Roman Catholic church in the southern part of Wrocław's Old Town.

Along with the Old Town of Wrocław, it is designated a Historic Monument of Poland.

== History ==
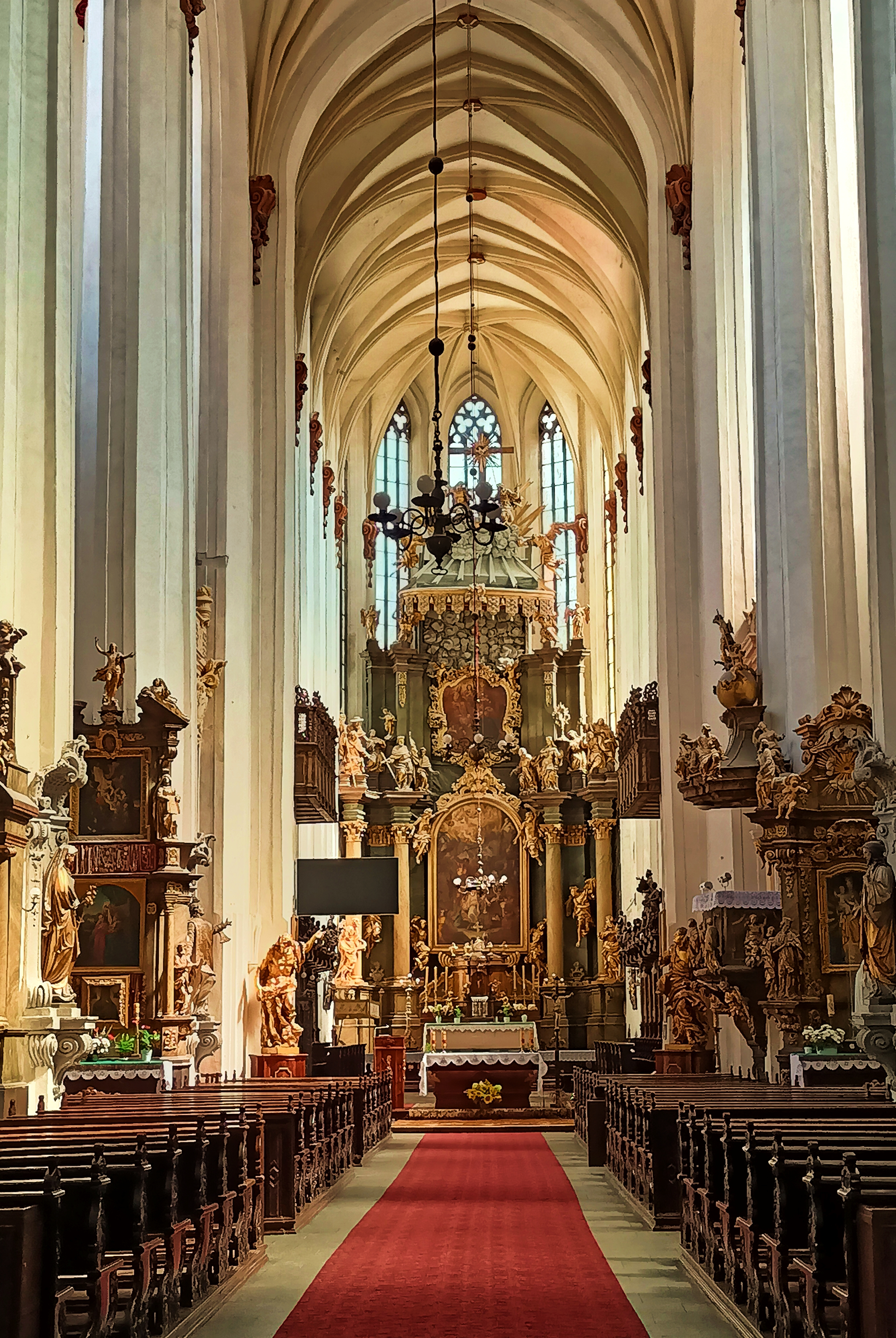
Interior

The church was founded to commemorate the signing of a treaty between Casimir III the Great of Poland and Charles IV, Holy Roman Emperor. The patrons of the church, Sts. Wenceslaus I, Duke of Bohemia, Stanislaus, and Dorothea represented Bohemia, Poland, and Silesia: the coat of arms of the three realms were placed under the windows on the outside of the apse. The church was built under the supervision of the Augustinian hermits on a plot of land purchased by the burghers Job Stille and Jakob Reymfried.

The church was built in 1351 as a three-nave, high hall with a pentagonal chancel and apse covered with a cross vault. The chancel was completed in 1381, and the apse and nave in 1401.

In 1350 the church was taken over by the Franciscan order expelled from the Church of St. Vincent. However, the number of brothers continued to dwindle rapidly due to the Reformation and already by 20 October 1534 they had left the building. It was not until October 15, 1561, that Emperor Ferdinand I allowed the deconsecration of the building and their temporary use for storage. Subsequent plains to bring in the Jesuits were unsuccessful, and in 1613 Emperor Matthias returned the building to the Franciscan Order, who took over the buildings on February 6, 1615. In 1686, the interior was rebuilt in an ornate Baroque style, as was the monastery building. In 1707 the church was made a parish church.

After the Prussian annexation of the city, and subsequent secularization of the order of 1810, the monastery buildings were used as a jail from 1817, and then after 1852 were used by the court. The former monastery entered a long decay, until the end of the 19th century it was decided to demolish then and the land was sold. On the site of the monastery was built a department store and the Hotel Monopol. In front of the western façade of a church was built a new entrance with a Gothic portal and a small square.

During the Siege of Breslau at the end of World War II, the church sustained only minor damage, and as a result it was one of the best preserved medieval buildings in Wrocław. After the war, it was for a time used as the city's procathedral.

== Gallery ==
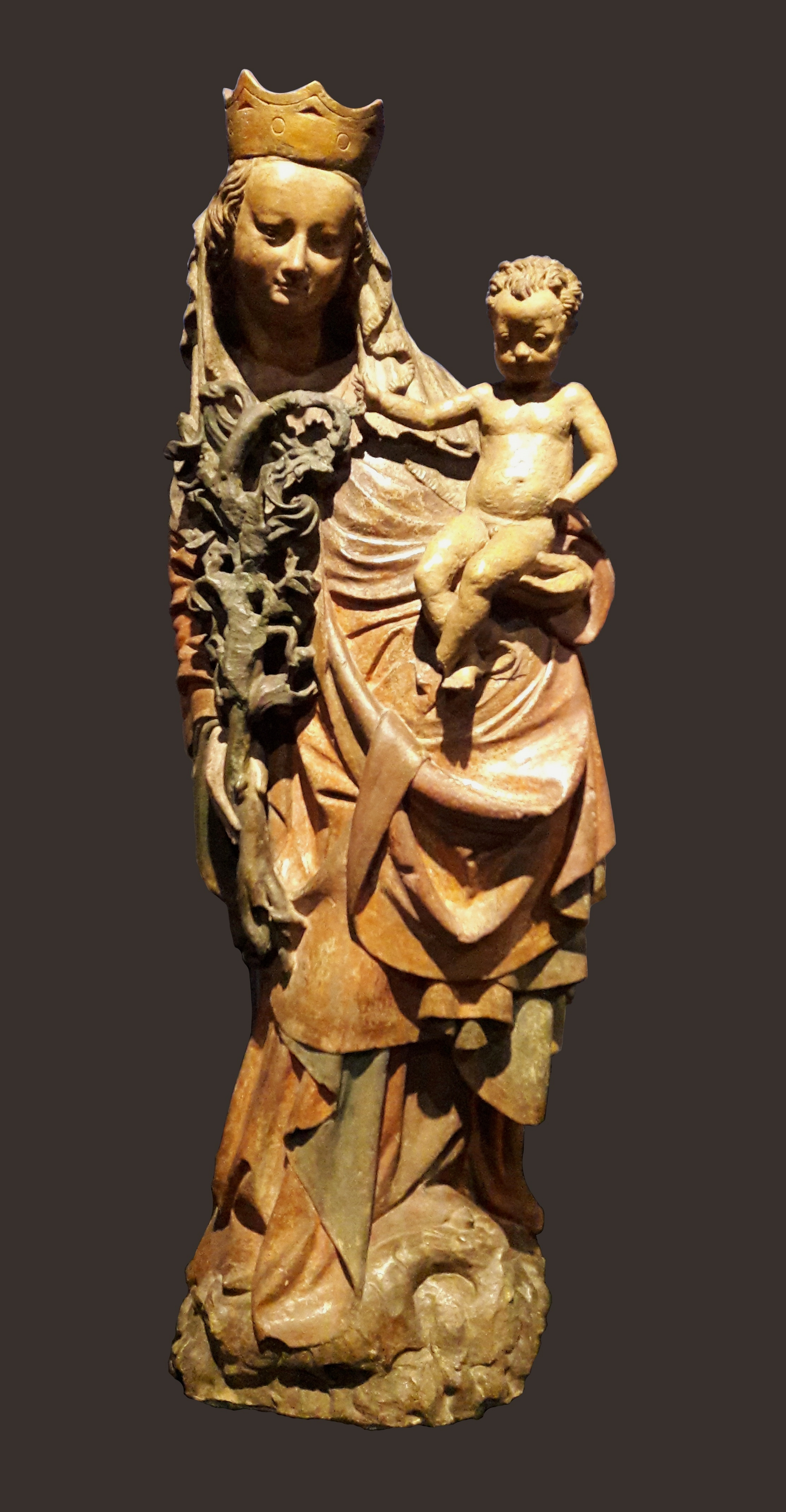
Statue of Madonna and Child with a vine branch from St. Dorothy's Church in Wrocław, circa 1430, National Museum in Warsaw collection.
