= Hajduki Nyskie =

- Village
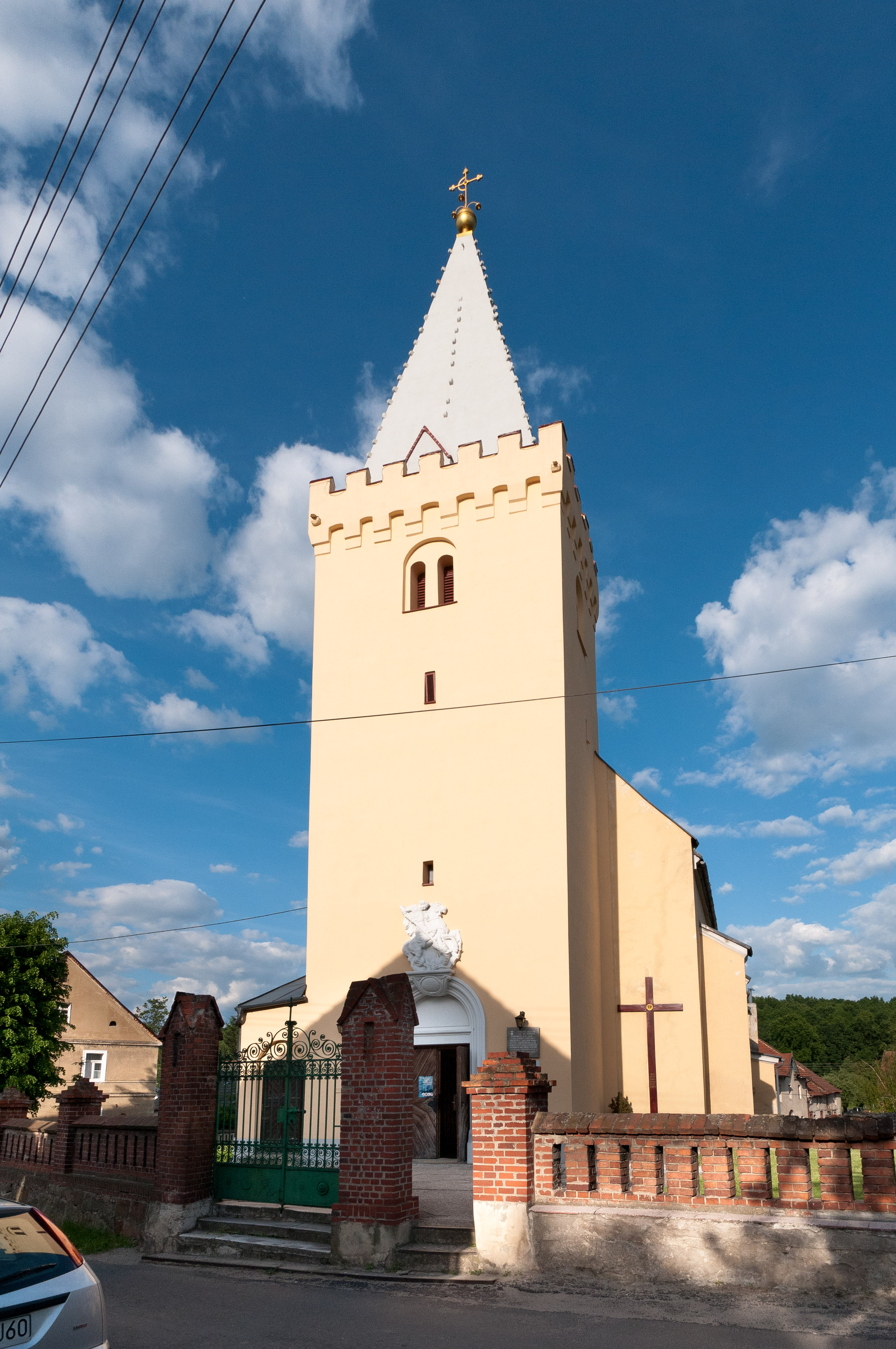
- Saint George church

- Location within Poland
- Coordinates: 50°26′N 17°22′E
- Country: Poland
- Voivodeship: Opole
- County: Nysa
- Gmina: Nysa

Hajduki Nyskie [xai̯ˈduki ˈnɨskʲɛ] (German: Heidau) is a village in the administrative district of Gmina Nysa, within Nysa County, Opole Voivodeship, in south-western Poland.

== Notable residents ==
- Otto Kretschmer (1912–1998), German U-boat commander and Admiral

== See also ==
- Golanka Górna
- Golanka Dolna
