= Tzernicus =

Ancient name of an area in northern Albania

Tzernicus was the ancient name of an area in northern Albania, eventually part of the medieval Bosnian region.

Tzernicus, also known as Cerminic, is also a titular see of the Roman Catholic Church centered on the ancient city of Çermenikë and belonged to the ecclesiastical province of Achrida in Ohrid, North Macedonia.

== Bishops ==
- Michael Rusnak (1964.08.25 – 1980.10.13)
- Jožef Smej (1983.04.15 – 2020.11.21)
- Mariusz Dmyterko (since 10 July 2025)
