= Golanka Górna =

- Village
- Location within Poland
- Coordinates: 51°14′58″N 16°18′22″E
- Country: Poland
- Voivodeship: Lower Silesian
- County: Legnica
- Gmina: Kunice

Golanka Górna [ɡɔˈlanka ˈɡurna] is a village in the administrative district of Gmina Kunice, within Legnica County, Lower Silesian Voivodeship, in south-western Poland.

It lies approximately 11 kilometres (7 mi) east of Legnica, and 53 kilometres (33 mi) west of the regional capital Wrocław.

== History ==
Until 1945, Golanka Górna was German and was named Ober-Heidau. It belonged to the Lower Silesian Liegnitz District in the Province of Silesia, Kingdom of Prussia, German Empire.

== See also ==
- Golanka Dolna
- Hajduki Nyskie
