= Szczedrzykowice railway station =

Railway station in south-western Poland

Szczedrzykowice
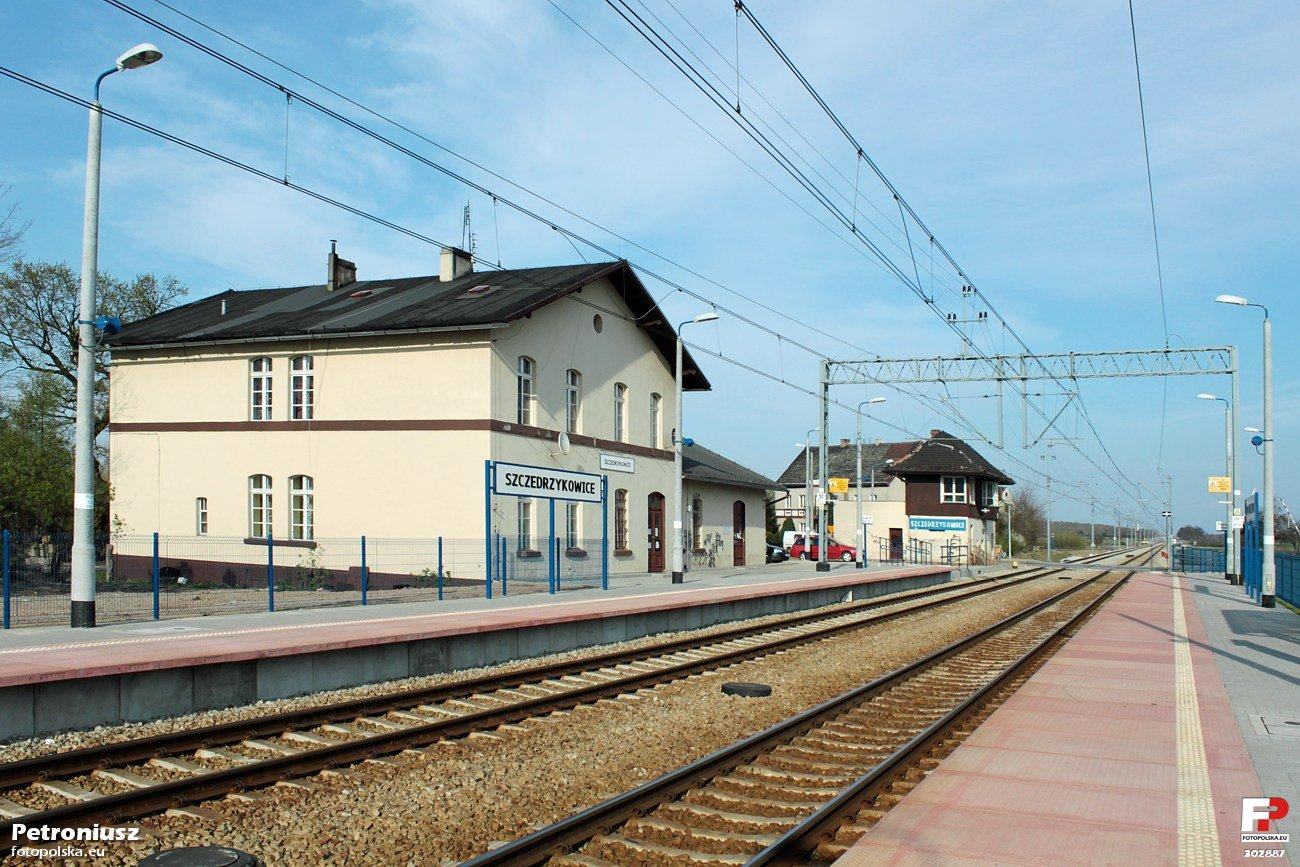
- Platforms and station building

General information
- Location: Szczedrzykowice-Stacja, Szczedrzykowice Lower Silesian Voivodeship; Poland
- Coordinates: 51°12′54.1″N 16°21′06.1″E
- Owner: Polish State Railways
- Line: Wrocław–Gubinek railway
- Platforms: 2

History
- Opened: 19 October 1844
- Former names: Spittelndorf (before 1945); Szpital (1945–1947)

Services
Preceding station	KD	Following station
Malczyce towards Wrocław Główny	D1	Jaśkowice Legnickie towards Lubań Śląski
Malczyce towards Wrocław Główny	D10	Jaśkowice Legnickie towards Dresden Hauptbahnhof
Location
- Location within Poland Location within Lower Silesian Voivodeship

Szczedrzykowice is a railway station on the Wrocław–Gubinek railway in the area of Szczedrzykowice-Stacja of Szczedrzykowice, Legnica County, within the Lower Silesian Voivodeship in south-western Poland.

== History ==
The station opened on 19 October 1844 as Spittelndorf. After World War II, the area came under Polish administration. As a result, the station was taken over by Polish State Railways. The station was renamed to Szpital and later to its modern name, Szczedrzykowice in 1947.

Part of the E30 main line modernisations, the station was modernised in 2011.

== Gallery ==
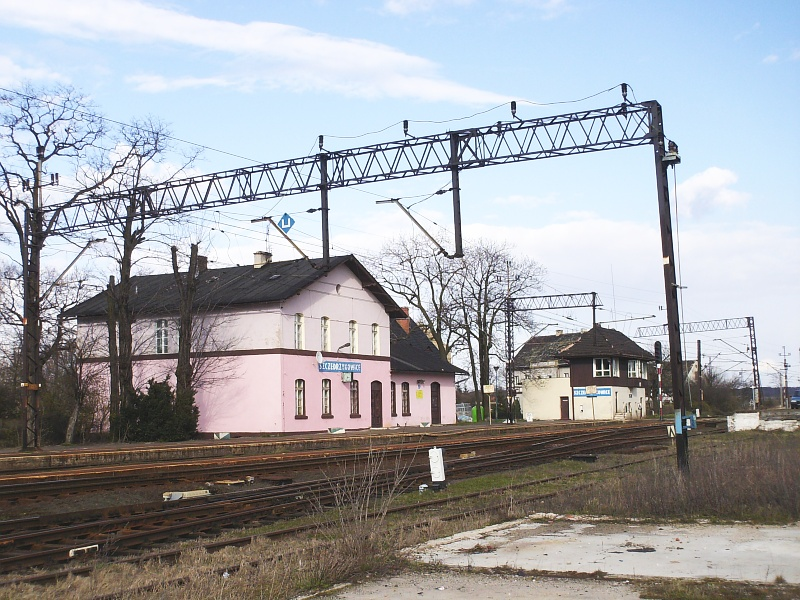
Station in 2008, prior to its modernisation

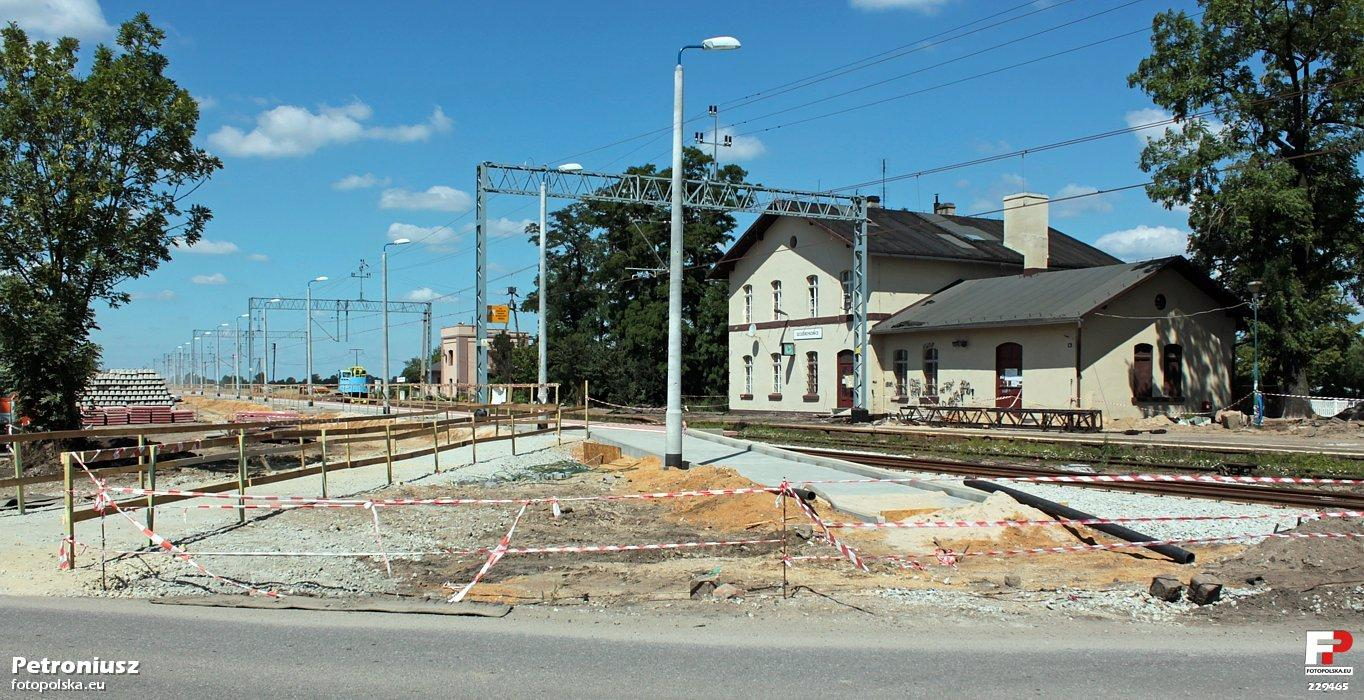
Station during its 2011 modernisation

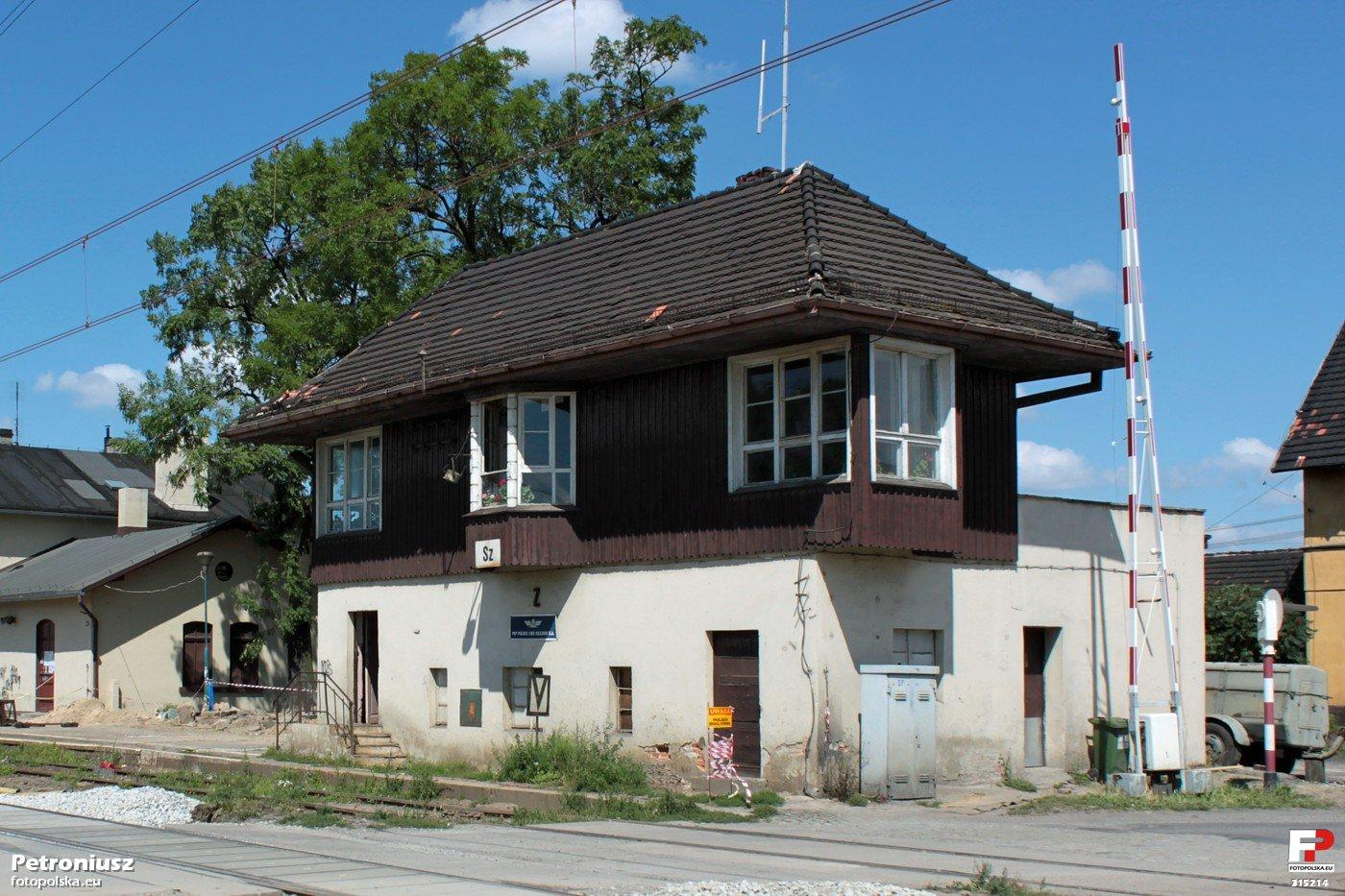
Signalbox

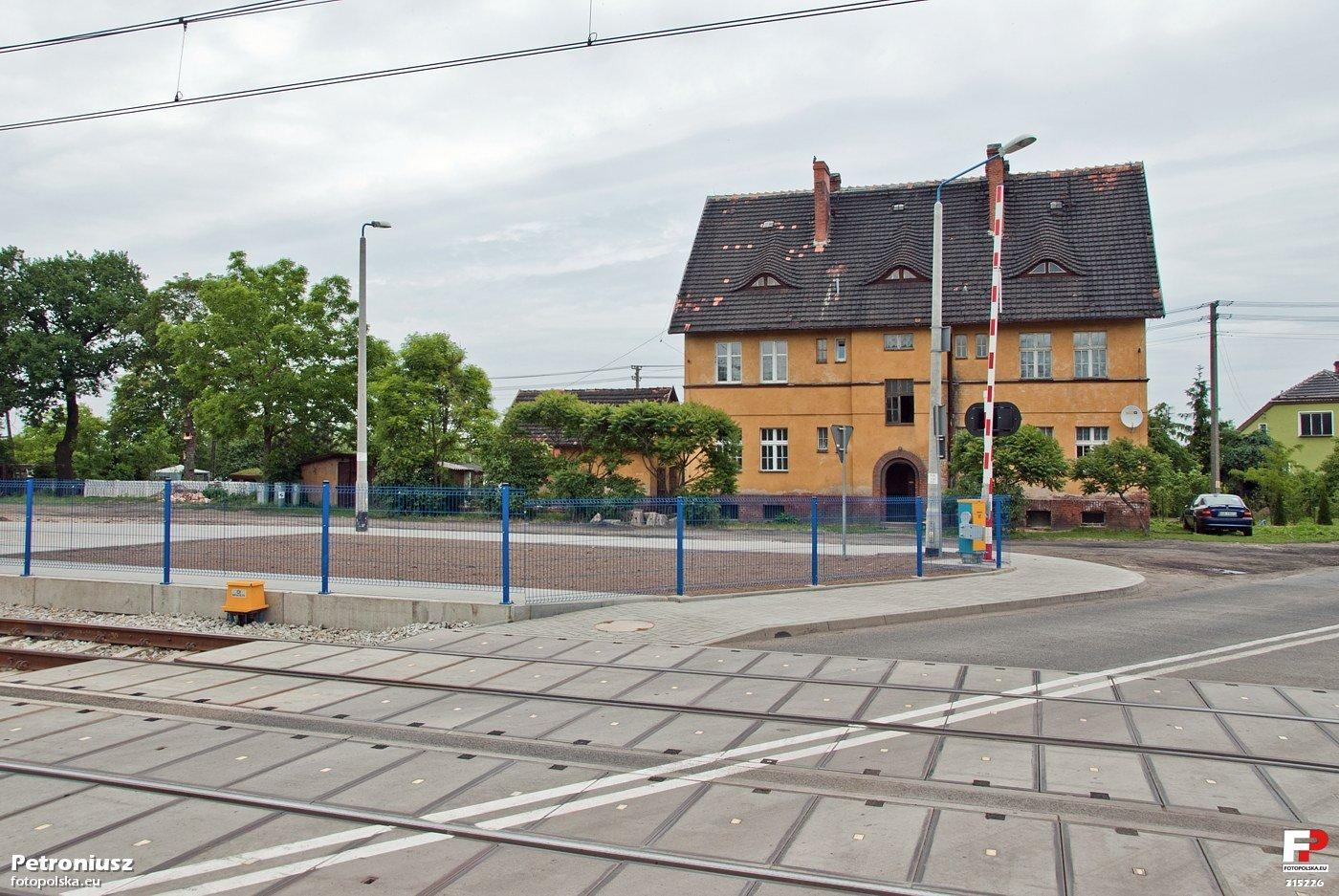
Level crossing

== Train services ==
The station is served by the following services:

- Regional services (KD) Wrocław - Legnica - Węgliniec - Lubań Śląski
- Regional services (KD) Wrocław - Legnica - Zgorzelec - Görlitz
