= Rogów Legnicki =

- Village
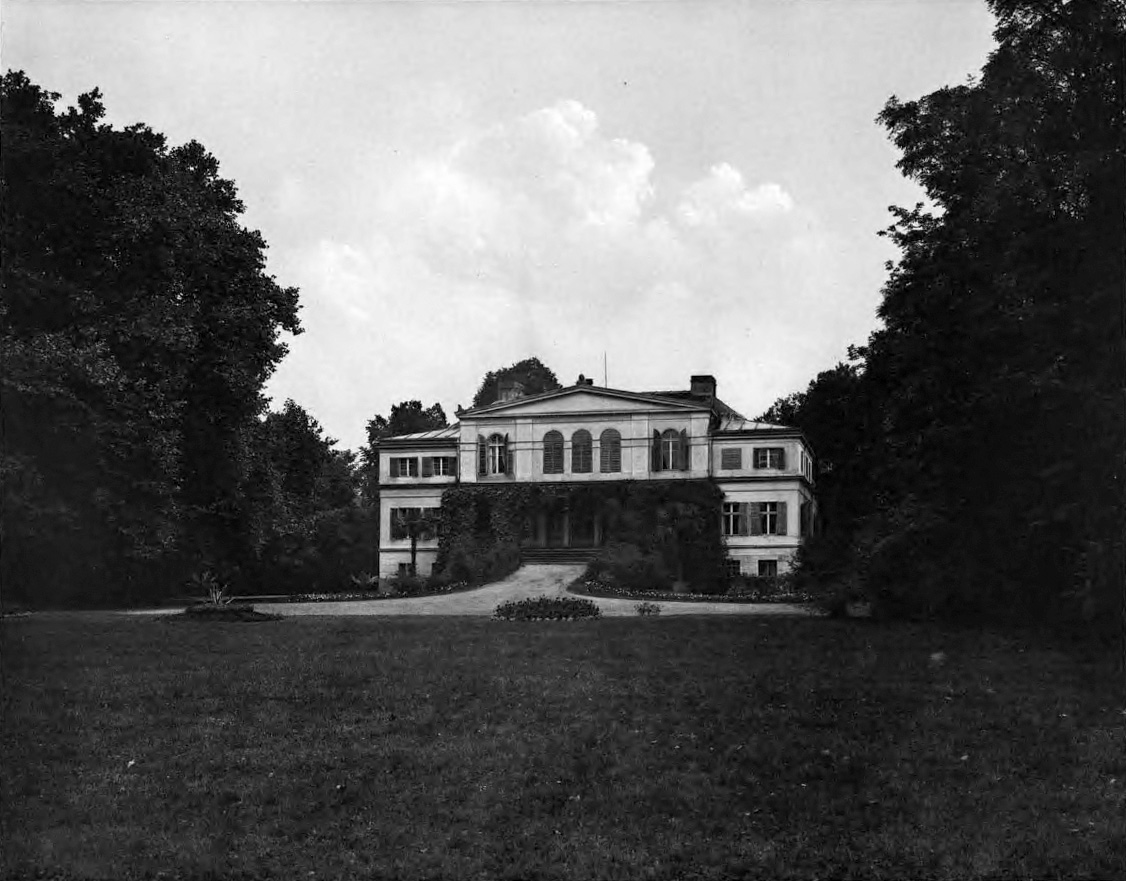

- Location within Poland
- Coordinates: 51°16′N 16°26′E
- Country: Poland
- Voivodeship: Lower Silesian
- County: Legnica
- Gmina: Prochowice

Population
  - Total: 310

Rogów Legnicki [ˈrɔɡuf lɛɡˈnit͡ski] is a village in the administrative district of Gmina Prochowice, within Legnica County, Lower Silesian Voivodeship, in south-western Poland.
