= Kawice =

- Village
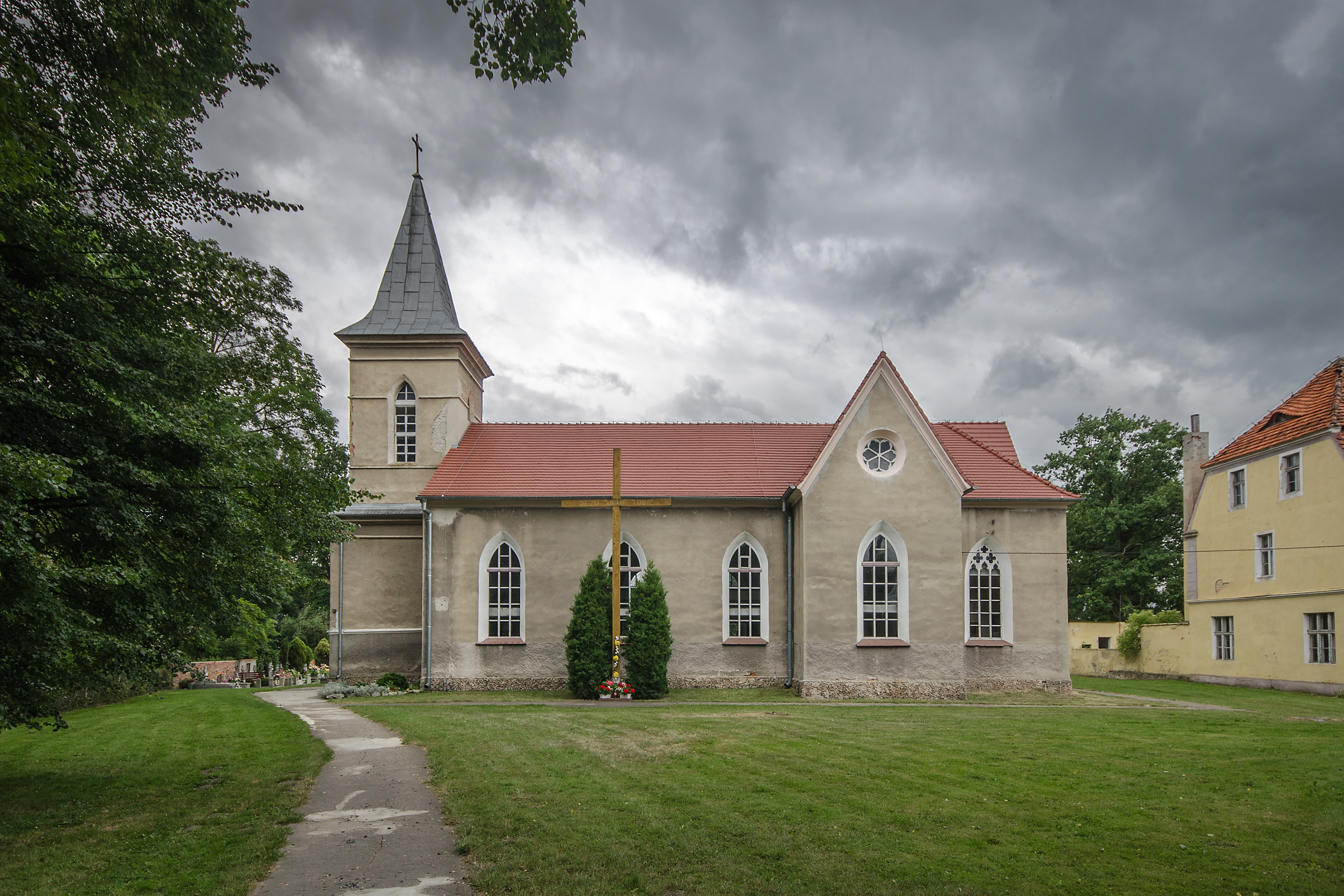
- Catholic church

- Location within Poland
- Coordinates: 51°13′54″N 16°25′24″E
- Country: Poland
- Voivodeship: Lower Silesian
- County: Legnica
- Gmina: Prochowice
- Population: 500

Kawice [kaˈvit͡sɛ] is a village in the administrative district of Gmina Prochowice, within Legnica County, Lower Silesian Voivodeship, in south-western Poland.
