= Gromadzyń =

Village in Lower Silesian Voivodeship, Poland

- Village
- Location within Poland
- Coordinates: 51°19′27″N 16°20′43″E
- Country: Poland
- Voivodeship: Lower Silesian
- County: Legnica
- Gmina: Prochowice

Gromadzyń [ɡrɔˈmad͡zɨɲ] is a village in the administrative district of Gmina Prochowice, within Legnica County, Lower Silesian Voivodeship, in south-western Poland.
