= Ukrainian Catholic Eparchy of Olsztyn–Gdańsk =

Ukrainian Catholic eparchy in Poland

Eparchy of Olsztyn–Gdańsk Dioecesis Allensteniensis–Gedanensis ritus bysantini ucraini Eparchia olsztynsko-gdańska
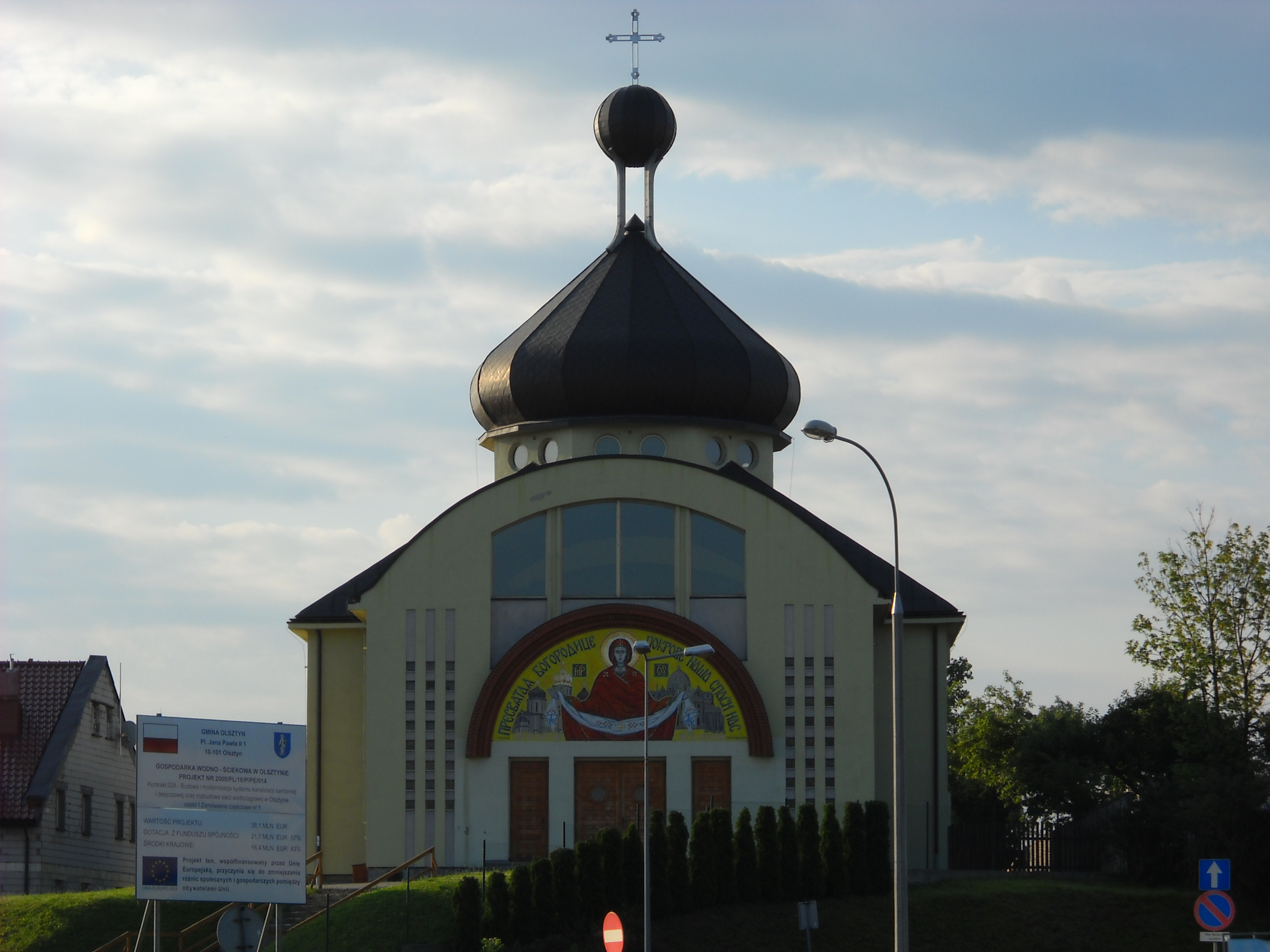
- Protection of the Mother of God Cathedral in Olsztyn

Location
- Country: Poland
- Ecclesiastical province: Archeparchy of Przemyśl–Warsaw
- Headquarters: Olsztyn, Poland

Statistics
- Area: 90,075 km^{2} (34,778 sq mi)
- Parishes: 42

Information
- Sui iuris church: Ukrainian Greek Catholic
- Rite: Byzantine Rite
- Established: 25 November 2020
- Cathedral: Protection of the Mother of God in Olsztyn

Current leadership
- Pope: Leo XIV
- Major Archbishop: Archbishop Sviatoslav Shevchuk
- Bishop: Arkadiusz Trochanowski
- Metropolitan Archbishop: Eugeniusz Popowicz Archbishop of the Ukrainian Catholic Archeparchy of Przemyśl-Warsaw

Map
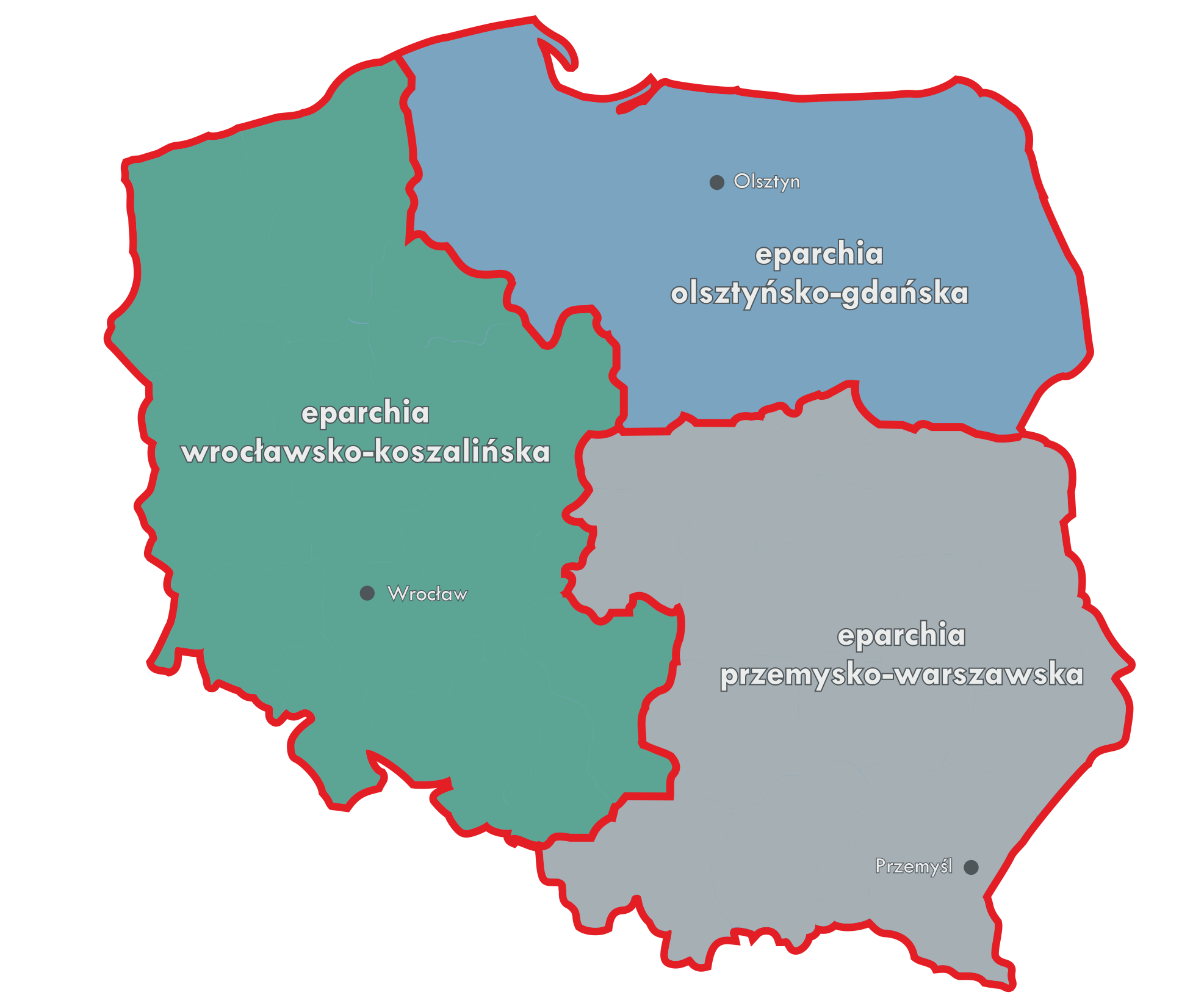
- Eparchy in blue

Website
- Official website

The Ukrainian (Greek) Catholic Eparchy of Olsztyn–Gdańsk (Olsztyn–Gdańsk of the Ukrainians) is a suffragan eparchy (Eastern Catholic diocese) in the ecclesiastical province of the Ukrainian Catholic Archeparchy of Przemyśl–Warsaw, which covers some part of Poland for the Ukrainian Greek Catholic Church (Byzantine rite in Ukrainian language) parallel to the Latin hierarchy. It depends from the Roman Congregation for the Oriental Churches.

Its episcopal see is the Cathedral of the Protection of the Mother of God in Olsztyn in the Warmian-Masurian Voivodeship.

It also has a Co-Cathedral, St. Bartholomew and Protection of the Mother of God, in Gdańsk, in the Pomeranian Voivodeship.

== Statistics ==
As per 2023, it pastorally served in 42 parishes with 32 priests (27 diocesan, 5 religious, that belong to the Order of Saint Basil the Great).

== History ==
- 25 November 2020: the Eparchy was established as Eparchy of Olsztyn–Gdańsk from the Ukrainian Catholic Archeparchy of Przemyśl–Warsaw and the Ukrainian Catholic Eparchy of Wrocław-Gdańsk.
- February 6, 2023: the Eparchy of Olsztyn–Gdańsk, as well as the entire Ukrainian Catholic Archeparchy of Przemyśl–Warsaw, taking into account the previous decision of the Ukrainian Greek Catholic Church in Ukraine and the opinion of the Delegates of the Joint Diocesan Council in Porszewice in June 2022, decided to switch to the Revised Julian calendar from September 1, 2023.

== Eparchial bishops ==
Eparchs of Olsztyn–Gdańsk

- Apostolic Administrator Metropolitan Eugeniusz Popowicz (25 November 2020 – 23 January 2021)
- Arkadiusz Trochanowski (since 25 November 2020)

== See also ==
- Ukrainian Greek Catholic Church
- List of Catholic dioceses in Poland

== Sources and external links ==
- Profile at Catholic Hierarchy
- Profile at GCatholic
- Decree of the Metropolis of Przemyśl-Warsaw on the transition to the Gregorian calendar dated February 6, 2023
