= Kwiatkowice, Lower Silesian Voivodeship =

Kwiatkowice
- Village
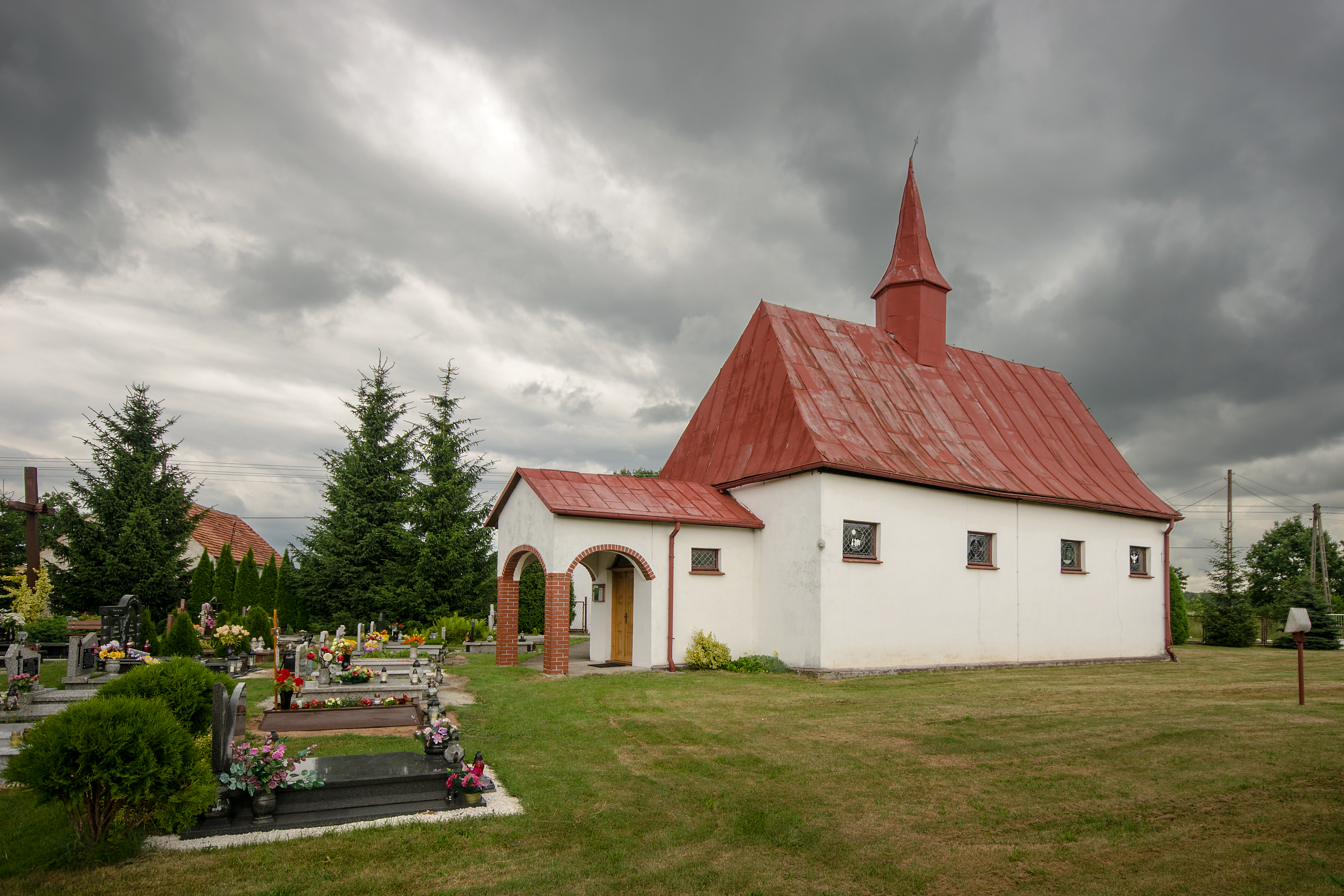
- Catholic church

- Location within Poland
- Coordinates: 51°16′N 16°24′E
- Country: Poland
- Voivodeship: Lower Silesian
- County: Legnica
- Gmina: Prochowice

Kwiatkowice [kfjatkɔˈvit͡sɛ] is a village in the administrative district of Gmina Prochowice, within Legnica County, Lower Silesian Voivodeship, in south-western Poland.
