= Ukrainian Catholic Eparchy of Wrocław–Koszalin =

Ukrainian Catholic eparchy in Poland

Coordinates: 51.1127°N 17.0384°E

Eparchy of Wrocław–Koszalin Dioecesis Vratislaviensis–Coslinensis ritus bysantini ucraini Eparchia wrocławsko-koszalinska
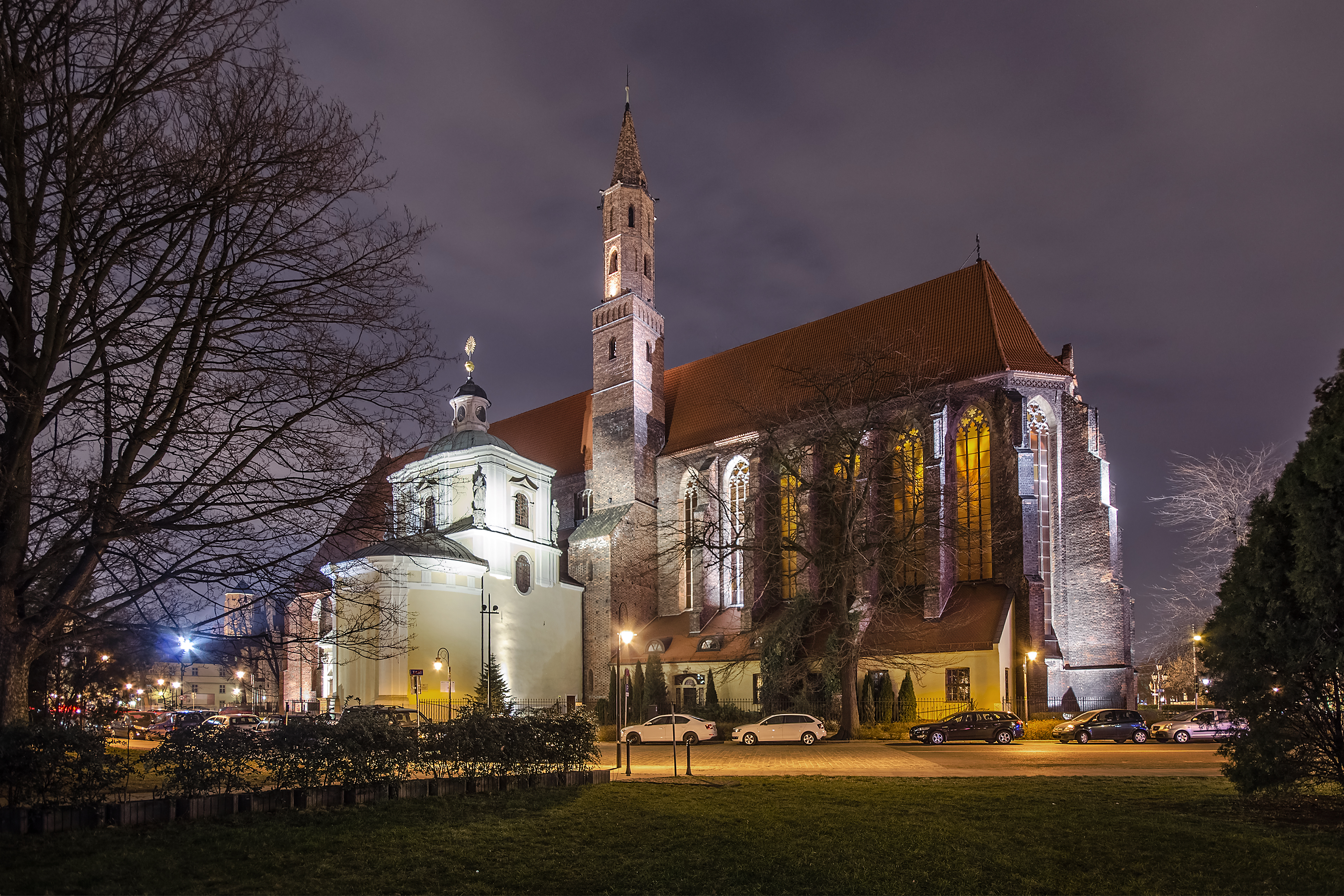
- St. Vincent and St. James Cathedral in Wrocław

Location
- Country: Poland
- Ecclesiastical province: Archeparchy of Przemyśl–Warsaw
- Headquarters: Wrocław, Poland
- Population: 20,100

Information
- Sui iuris church: Ukrainian Greek Catholic
- Rite: Byzantine Rite
- Established: 24 May 1996
- Cathedral: St. Vincent and St. James in Wrocław

Current leadership
- Pope: Leo XIV
- Major Archbishop: Archbishop Sviatoslav Shevchuk
- Bishop: Wlodzimierz Roman Juszczak, O.S.B.M. Bishop of Ukrainian Catholic Eparchy of Wrocław-Koszalin
- Metropolitan Archbishop: Eugeniusz Popowicz Archbishop of the Ukrainian Catholic Archeparchy of Przemyśl-Warsaw
- Auxiliary Bishops: Mariusz Dmyterko

Map
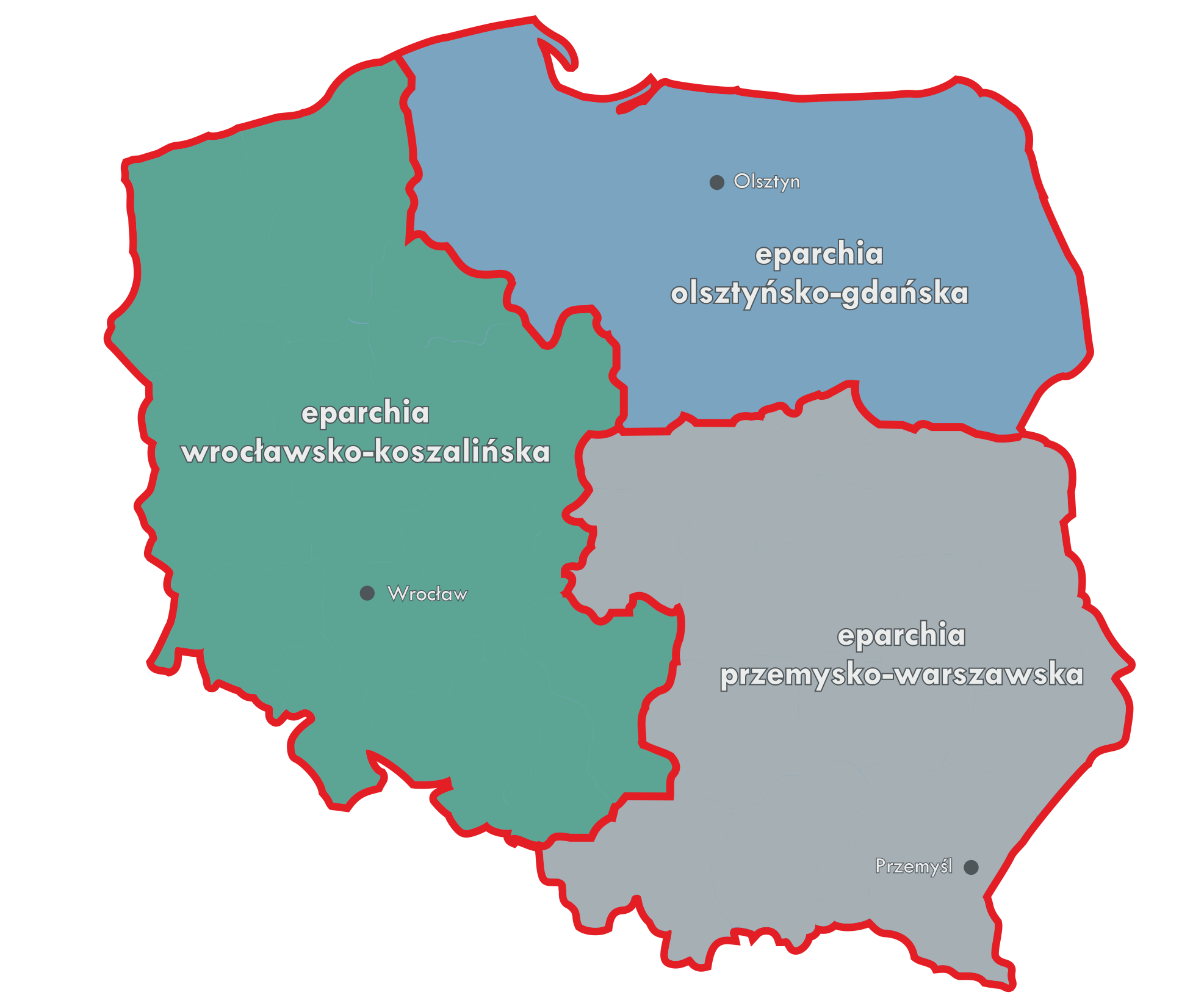
- Eparchy of Wrocław-Koszalin in green

Website
- www.cerkiew.net.pl

The Ukrainian (Greek) Catholic Eparchy of Wrocław–Koszalin (Wrocław–Koszalin of the Ukrainians) is a suffragan eparchy (Eastern Catholic diocese) in the ecclesiastical province of the Ukrainian Catholic Archeparchy of Przemyśl–Warsaw, which covers some part of Poland for the Ukrainian Greek Catholic Church (Byzantine rite in Ukrainian language) parallel to the Latin hierarchy. It depends from the Roman Congregation for the Oriental Churches.

Its episcopal see is the St. Vincent and St. James Cathedral in Wrocław (western Poland), in the administrative Dolnośląskie Province (Lower Silesian Voivodeship).

== Statistics ==
As per 2023, it pastorally served 20,100 Catholics in 56 parishes with 43 priests (42 diocesan, 1 religious), 10 lay religious (1 brother, 9 sisters) and 4 seminarians.

== History ==
- 24 May 1996: the Eparchy was established as Eparchy of Wrocław–Gdańsk from the Ukrainian Catholic Archeparchy of Przemyśl–Warsaw.
- 25 November 2020: Changed name from Eparchy of Wrocław–Gdańsk to Eparchy of Wrocław–Koszalin
- 25 November 2020: Lost territory along with the Ukrainian Catholic Archeparchy of Przemyśl–Warsaw to establish the new Ukrainian Catholic Eparchy of Olsztyn–Gdańsk
- February 6, 2023: the Eparchy of Wrocław–Koszalin, as well as the entire Ukrainian Catholic Archeparchy of Przemyśl–Warsaw, taking into account the previous decision of the Ukrainian Greek Catholic Church in Ukraine and the opinion of the Delegates of the Joint Diocesan Council in Porszewice in June 2022, decided to switch to the Revised Julian calendar from September 1, 2023.

== Eparchial bishops ==
Eparchs of Wrocław–Gdańsk

- Teodor Majkowicz (12 July 1997 – death 9 May 1998)
  - Administrator Fr. Petro Kryk (1998 – 1999)
- Wlodzimierz Roman Juszczak, O.S.B.M. (24 April 1999 – ...)

== See also ==
- Ukrainian Greek Catholic Church
- List of Catholic dioceses in Poland

== Sources and external links ==
- (in Polish) Official website (in Polish)
- GCatholic.org with Google map and - satellite photo, data for all sections
- Decree of the Metropolis of Przemyśl-Warsaw on the transition to the Gregorian calendar dated February 6, 2023
