= Cichobórz, Lower Silesian Voivodeship =

Cichobórz
- Village
- Location within Poland
- Coordinates: 51°13′36″N 16°23′40″E
- Country: Poland
- Voivodeship: Lower Silesian
- County: Legnica
- Gmina: Prochowice

Cichobórz [t͡ɕiˈxɔbuʂ] is a village in the administrative district of Gmina Prochowice, within Legnica County, Lower Silesian Voivodeship, in south-western Poland.
