= Prochowice =

Town in Lower Silesian Voivodeship, Poland

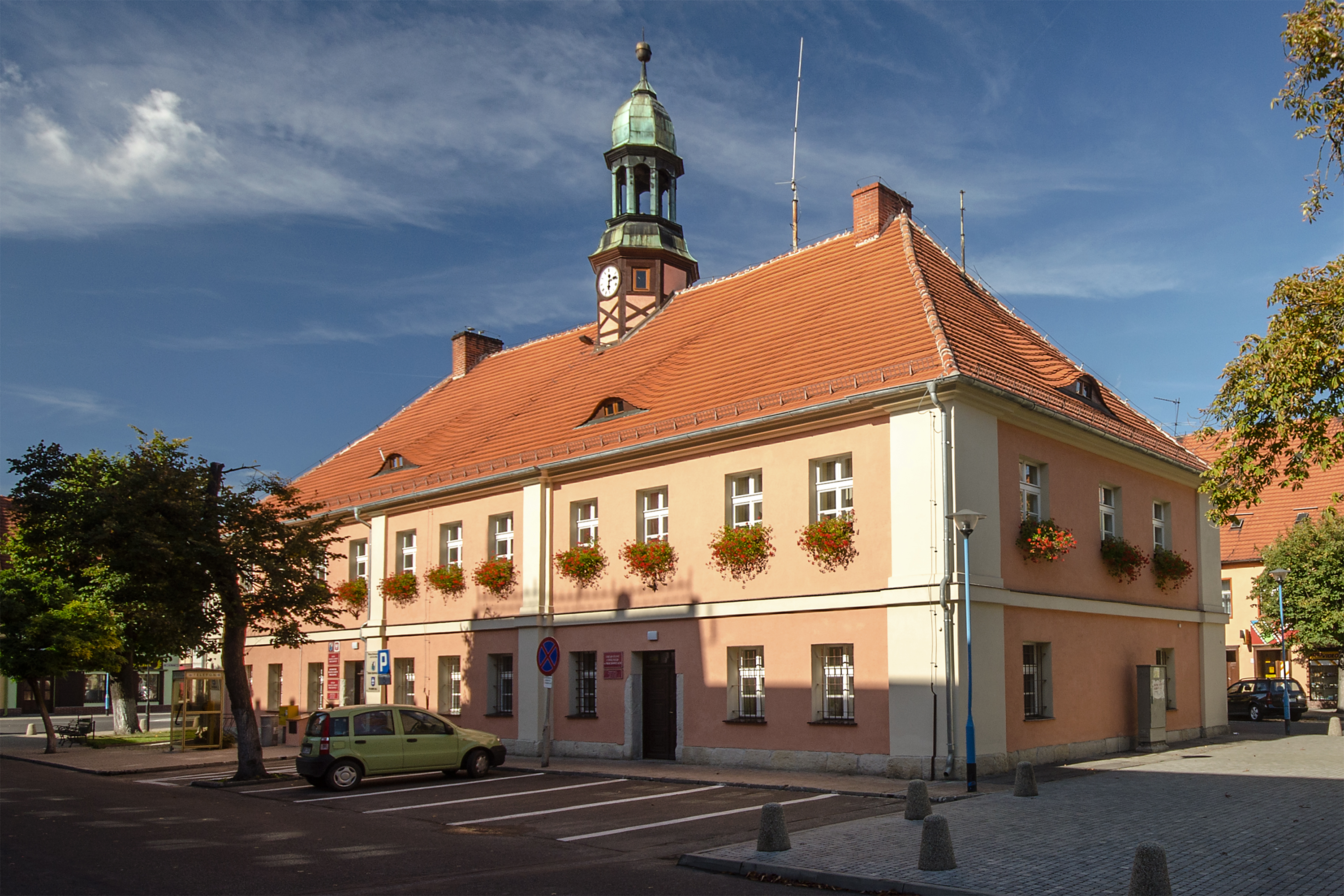
- Town Hall

- Flag Coat of arms

- Location within Poland
- Coordinates: 51°16′27″N 16°21′54″E
- Country: Poland
- Voivodeship: Lower Silesian
- County: Legnica
- Gmina: Prochowice

Government
  - Mayor: Alicja Sielicka

Area
  - Total: 9.85 km^{2} (3.80 sq mi)

Population (2019-06-30)
  - Total: 3,602
  - Density: 366/km^{2} (947/sq mi)
- Time zone: UTC+1 (CET)
  - Summer (DST): UTC+2 (CEST)
- Postal code: 59-230
- Vehicle registration: DLE
- Website: http://www.prochowice.com

Prochowice [prɔxɔˈvʲit͡sɛ] (German: Parchwitz) is a town in Legnica County, Lower Silesian Voivodeship, in south-western Poland. It is the seat of the administrative district (gmina) called Gmina Prochowice.

As of 2019, the town has a population of 3,602.

== History ==
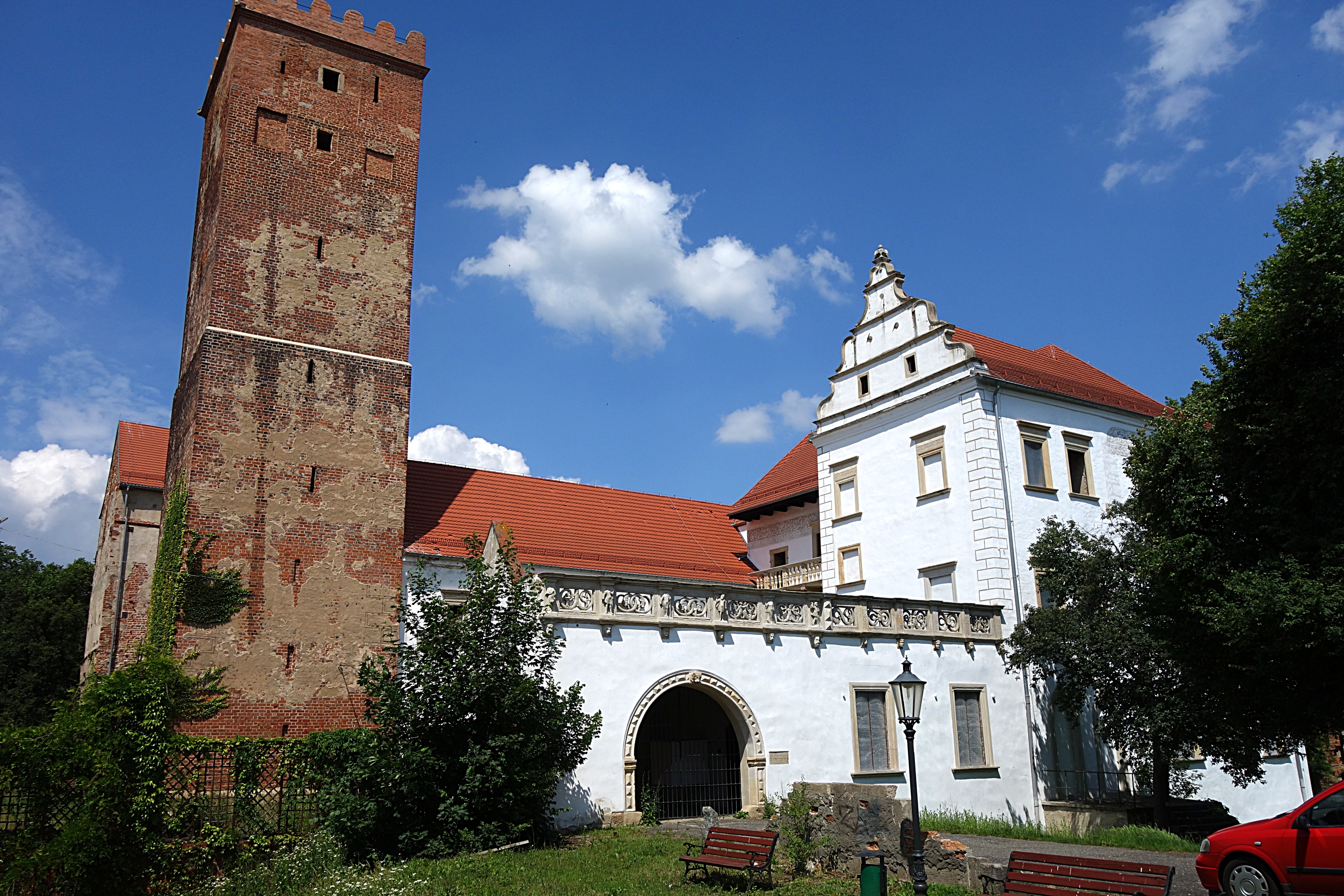
Castle

The town was formerly known in Polish as Parchwice. It was supposedly founded by a man named Iko, who obtained privileges from Duke Bolesław II the Horned either in 1255 or 1259. The parish church was founded in 1300. In 1374, the privileges were confirmed and town rights were made equal to those of nearby Legnica. It was ravaged by the Hussites in 1428. A hospital was founded in 1484. From 1630 to 1637, it was the seat of Duke George Rudolf of Legnica. In 1642, it was ravaged by Swedish forces of Lennart Torstensson.

== Transport ==
National road 94 bypasses Prochowice to the south. National road 94 connects Prochowice to Legnica to the west and to Wrocław to the east.

National road 36 bypasses Prochowice to the west.

The nearest railway station is in Legnica.
