= Dąbie, Legnica County =

Dąbie
- Village
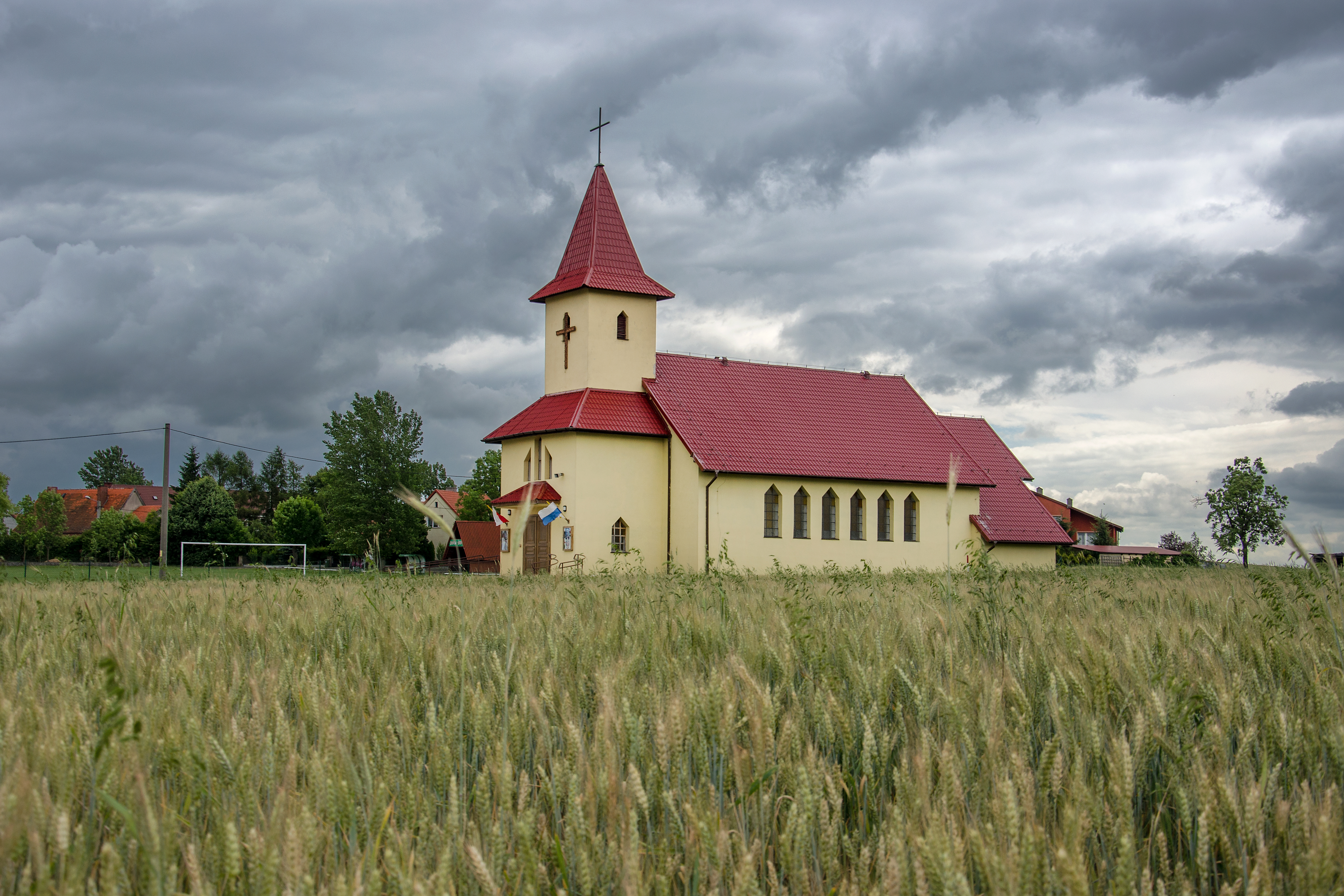
- Catholic church

- Location within Poland
- Coordinates: 51°13′31″N 16°22′06″E
- Country: Poland
- Voivodeship: Lower Silesian
- County: Legnica
- Gmina: Prochowice

Dąbie ([ˈdɔmbjɛ]; German: Dahme) is a village in the administrative district of Gmina Prochowice, within Legnica County, Lower Silesian Voivodeship, in south-western Poland.
