= Szczedrzykowice-Stacja =

- Village
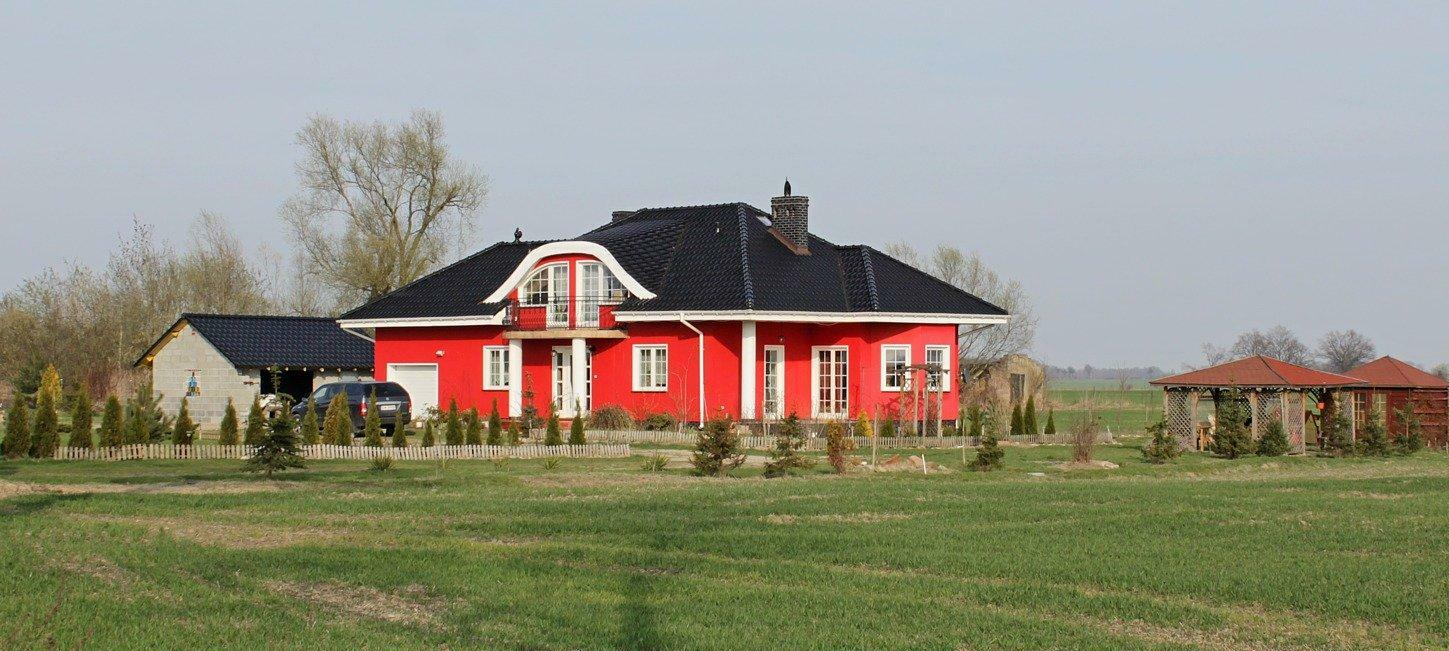

- Location within Poland
- Coordinates: 51°12′52″N 16°21′06″E
- Country: Poland
- Voivodeship: Lower Silesian
- County: Legnica
- Gmina: Prochowice

Szczedrzykowice-Stacja [ʂt͡ʂɛdʐɨkɔˈvit͡sɛ ˈstat͡sja] is a village in the administrative district of Gmina Prochowice, within Legnica County, Lower Silesian Voivodeship, in south-western Poland.

The area is served by Szczedrzykowice railway station.
