= St. Vincent and St. James Cathedral, Wrocław =

Ukrainian Catholic cathedral in Wrocław, Poland

St. Vincent and St. James Cathedral
- Katedra św. Wincentego i św. Jakuba
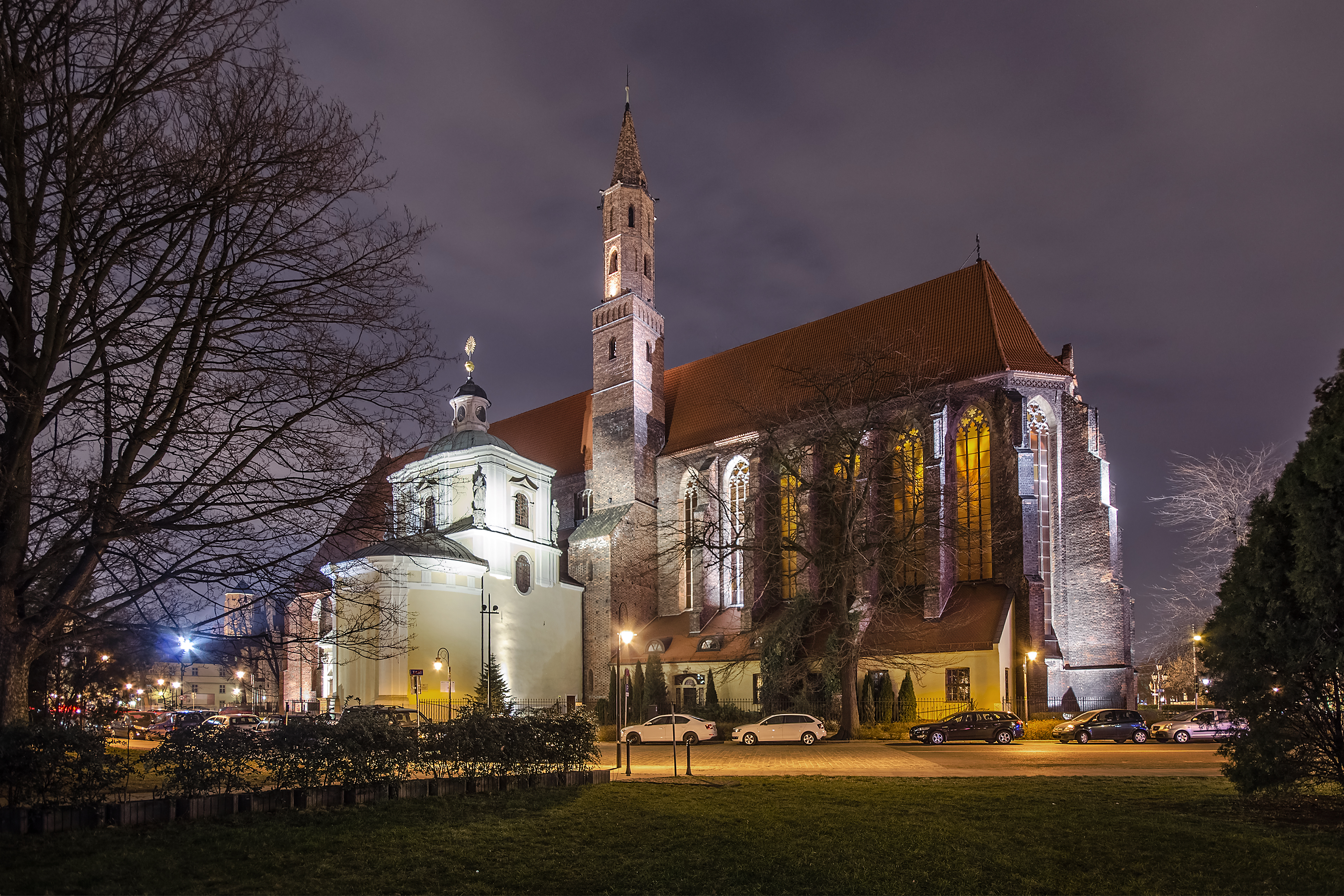
- Night view

- 51°06′46″N 17°02′17″E
- Location: Wrocław
- Country: Poland
- Denomination: Catholic Church
- Sui iuris church: Ukrainian Greek Catholic Church

History
- Status: Cathedral
- Founder: Henry II the Pious
- Dedication: Vincent of Lérins and James the Great
- Consecrated: 1240

Architecture
- Functional status: Active
- Heritage designation: Historic Monument of Poland
- Designated: 8 September 1994
- Style: Gothic
- Completed: 1256; 1999 (reconstruction)

Administration
- Diocese: Wrocław–Koszalin

The Cathedral of St. Vincent and St. James (Polish: Katedra św. Wincentego i św. Jakuba) is a Gothic cathedral located in the Old Town of Wrocław, Poland, seat of the Ukrainian Catholic Eparchy of Wrocław. It is one the burial sites of Polish monarchs.

Along with the Old Town of Wrocław, it is listed as a Historic Monument of Poland.

== History ==
The church was founded by Duke Henry II the Pious together with a monastery for the Franciscans brought from Prague around 1240, perhaps even as early as 1232 or 1234. Initially it was named for St. James and built in the Romanesque style. Very soon into its construction the crypt became the burial place of its founder, who was killed in 1241 fighting the Mongols at the Battle of Legnica during the first Mongol invasion of Poland. In this church, mentioned as being completed by 1254, on December 16, 1261 was announced a new foundation charter for the city under Magdeburg Law, allowing further development of Wrocław.

In the fourteenth and fifteenth century the church underwent a major reconstruction and expansion, which lasted for a long time. During these reconstructions the church still maintained a predominantly Gothic style. A quadrangle monastery adjacent to the north was constructed, unusual for the area.

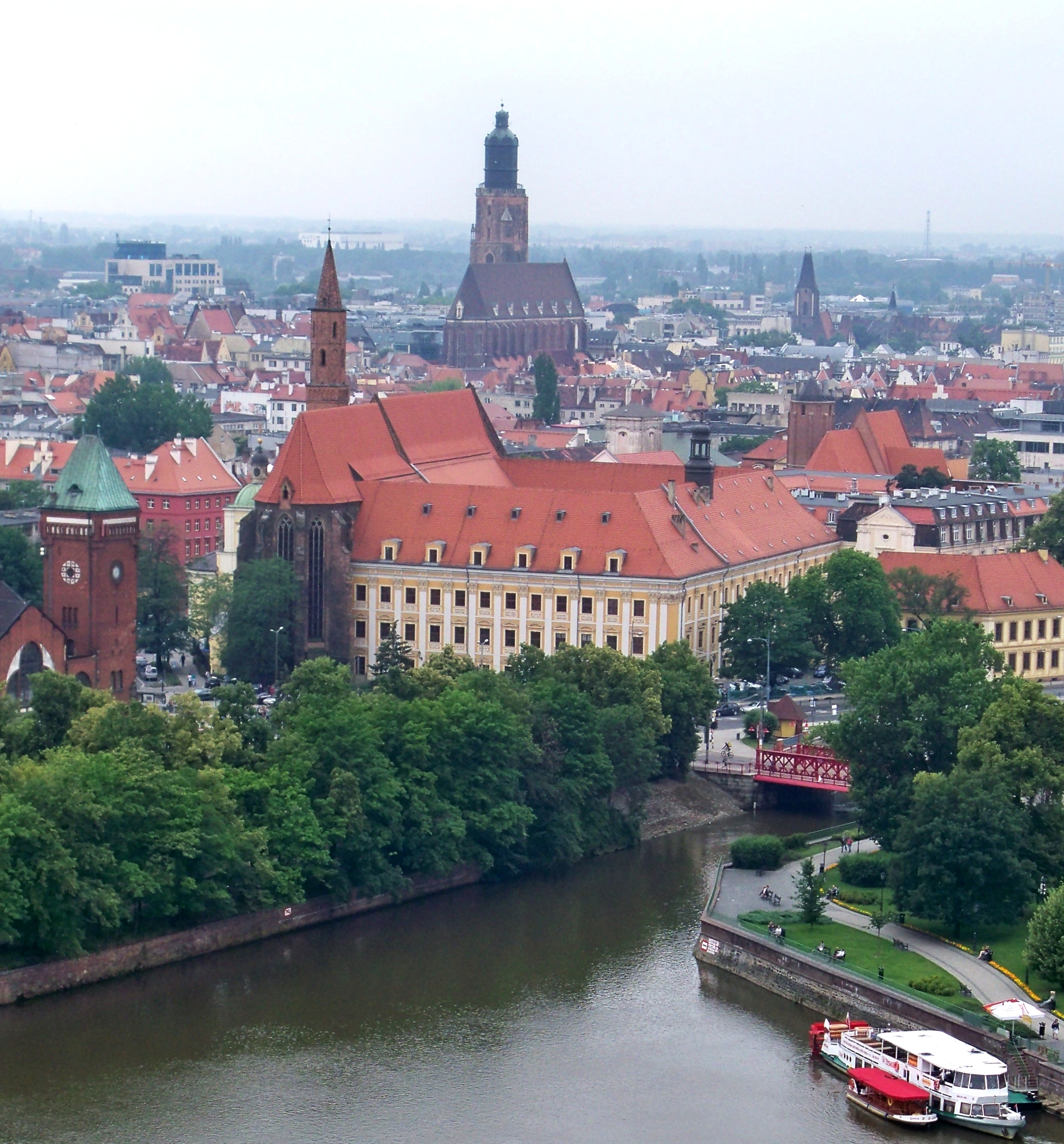
St. Vincent Cathedral and former Franciscan monastery (St. Elizabeth's Church in background)

At the beginning of the 16th century the Franciscans were forced to either convert to Protestantism or leave Wrocław. Those who remained were in 1529 moved to St. Dorothea's. The abandoned church was taken over by the Premonstratensians after the decision was made by the city council to demolish their monastery in Ołbin. On June 3, 1530, the church was rededicated to the patron saint of the demolished monastery, St. Vincent of Saragossa.

Between 1662-1674 the interior of the church was transformed with rich Baroque furnishings, including a new altar built in 1667 by Franz Zeller and Georg Czermak. In 1673 abbot Andreas Gebel initiated a reconstruction of the monastery in the Baroque style as well. The late Baroque Hochberg Chapel, officially the Chapel of Our Lady of Sorrows. was built on the southern façade from 1723-1727 by Christoph Hackner on the site of an older Gothic chapel. It was built on the orders of Count Ferndinant von Hochberg, head of the Norbertine order, as his mausoleum, though he was never buried there. It was decorated with frescoes depicting the Seven Sorrows of Mary and sculptures by Johann Georg Urbanski and Johann Adam Karinger. The astounding grille and gate to the chapel were the work of the locksmith Jacob Meyer.

After Prussia's secularization order of 1810, St. Vincent's was made into a parish church and the monastery buildings were converted into court offices. In the last days of World War II, during the Siege of Breslau, the church sustained severe damage. The tower collapsed, along with part of the side wall and vaults, and most of the interior furnishings were either destroyed or looted. The famous Hochberg Chapel was burned in a raid on Easter Sunday of 1945. After the war, the choir stalls, which had survived in good condition, were transferred to the Cathedral. The rebuilt church (whose lantern and cupola were only rebuilt in the 1980s), for a time temporarily served as the Garrison Church after a fire gutted St. Elizabeth's in the 1970s. In 1997 Pope John Paul II and Cardinal Henryk Gulbinowicz donated the church as the seat of the Greek Catholic Eparchate of Wrocław-Gdańsk. In 1999 basic reconstruction work on the church was finally finished. The ruined Hochberg Chapel was restored from 2012-2013.

The peal of the church, consisting of three bells, was removed during the Second World War and brought to Hamburg to serve as resource for war production. However it wasn't melted down before the end of the war and is now used by the St. Antonius church in Lippstadt. Two additional smaller bells were also brought to Hamburg and are now part of the "Memorial of the German East" in Burg Castle, North Rhine-Westphalia.
