= Myroslav Marusyn =

Ukrainian Greek Catholic archbishop

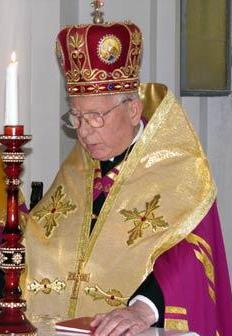
Archbishop Myroslav Marusyn

Miroslav Stefan Marusyn (26 June 1924 in Kniaze – 21 September 2009) was a Ukrainian Greek Catholic archbishop who served as the Secretary of the Congregation for the Oriental Churches from his appointment on 14 September 1982 until his retirement on 11 April 2001.

Myroslav Stefan Marusyn died on 21 September 2009 at the age of 85.
