= Włodzimierz Juszczak =

- Archbishop-Metropolitan of Ukrainian Catholic Eparchy of Wrocław-Gdańsk
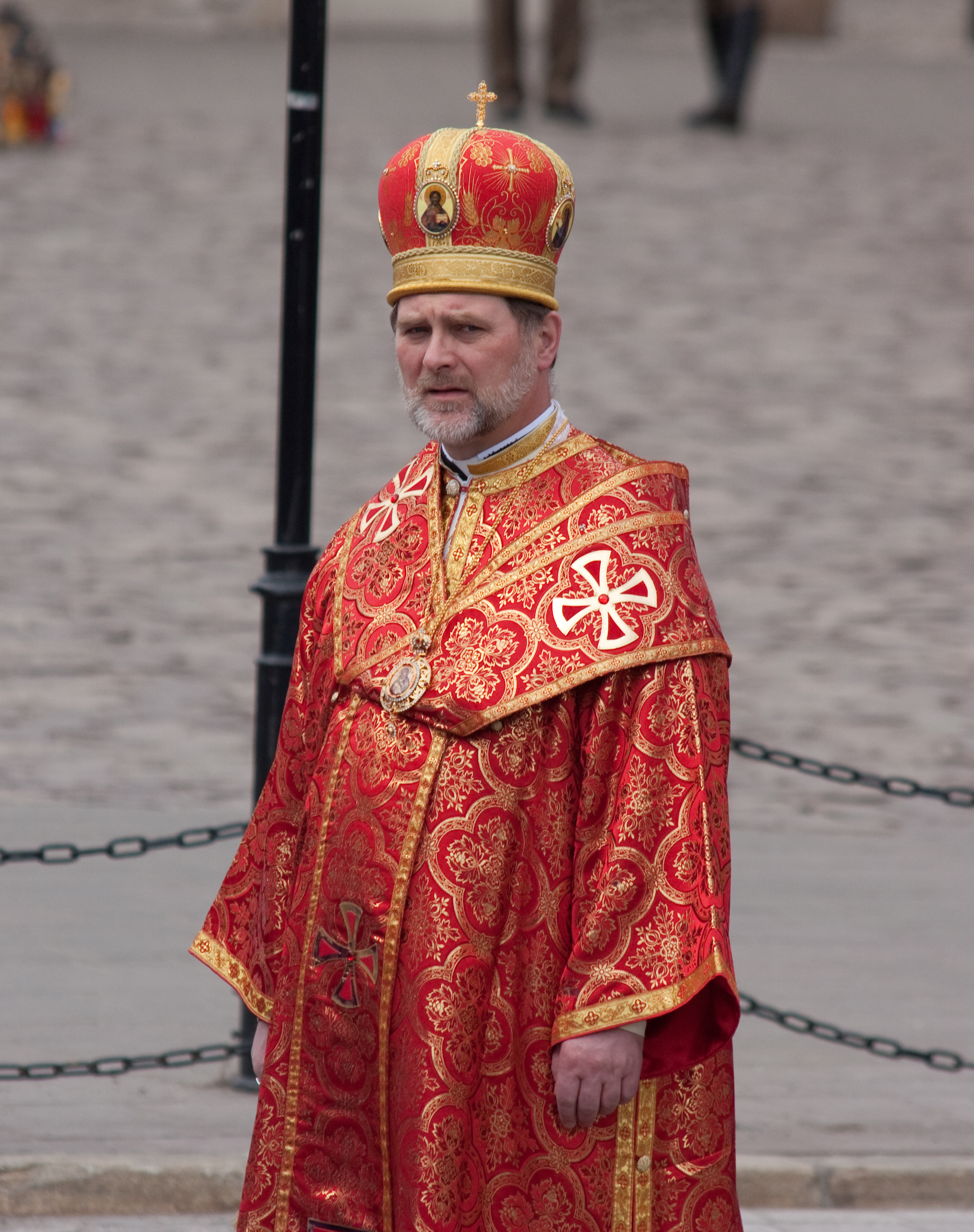
- Church: Ukrainian Greek Catholic Church
- Appointed: 24 April 1999
- Predecessor: Teodor Majkowicz
- Successor: Incumbent

Orders
- Ordination: 28 May 1983 (Priest) by Henryk Roman Gulbinowicz
- Consecration: 19 June 1999 (Bishop) by Jan Martyniak

Personal details
- Born: Włodzimierz Roman Juszczak; 19 July 1957 (age 67); Legnica, Poland

Coat of arms of Włodzimierza Juszczaka

Włodzimierz Roman Juszczak OSBM (born 19 July 1957 in Legnica, Poland) is the current bishop ordinary of the Wrocław-Gdańsk Eparchy of the Ukrainian Greek Catholic Church.

== Biography ==
Włodzimierz Juszczak's parents were deported from a village near Gorlitz called Bednarek in the Lemko region as a result of the Operation Vistula in 1942 to forced labor in Germany. On the way back from exile, the family learned that, on 11 April 1945, 180 people were killed there, of Ukrainian nationality, together with the pastor, Fr. Biłykiem. In this situation, for a time he stopped in the village of Rosochata near Legnica, where in 1947, met with displaced persons from the Lemko. His parents met themselves in 1956 and entered into a marriage.

== Childhood and youth ==
The first son Roman, received the sacraments of Baptism and Confirmation in the Greek-Catholic parish in Legnica, where he served as the pastoral care of Fr. Vladimir Hajdukiewicz, and mentioned in the baptismal registry as number one. He attended elementary school in 1972 in Rosochata and attended the Ukrainian High School in Legnica in the care of Jarosławy Kisielewski, dedicated and outstanding teacher. Legnica parish pastor and youth minister at the time was Father John Martyniak, now Greek Catholic Archbishop of Przemyśl-Warsaw.

== Religious life ==
After graduation, on 31 August 1976, Juszczak joined the Basilian Order, while studying in secondary school. He took the religious name Vladimir and his novitiate under the spiritual leadership of Father Josaphat Romanyka. His first vows were on 18 June 1978, and he studied philosophy and theology at the Major Seminary in Warsaw, where he graduated in 1983 and on 1 May made his final vows. On 8 May he was ordained a deacon and was ordained priest on May 28 in Legnica, Wroclaw at the hands of Archbishop Henry Cardinal Gulbinowicz then worked as a parish priest in Bartoszyce opened in 1982 by Fr Julian Yokel and a parish in Asunach (Warmia-Mazury province), existing since 1957. In 1984 Juszczak began extramural studies at the Catholic Theological Academy in Warsaw in the Faculty of Canon Law and obtained a BA in 1990. In 1989 the Provincial Father Wasyl Medwit, the current Eparch of Kyiv appointed him to the Monastery of Warsaw, to include the duties of master of novices, and brothers prefect of students. His service in the Monastery of Warsaw took place at a time when Greek Catholic Church in Ukraine and all former communist countries went out from the underground (the modern catacombs). To give a helping hand to the Basilian communities that have just come out of hiding, and thus the whole Church, the Ukrainian Greek Catholic Church decided to open a monastery for Basilian novices and students from Ukraine, Romania and Slovakia.

In autumn 1993 he moved to the monastery in Węgorzewo, where he took the Greek Catholic parish duties, and became the dean of Olsztyn. After Father Basil Medwit's elevation to the rank of bishop, since July 1994 he became a protoihumena (provincial) of a Basilian community in Poland and returned to Warsaw. With the help of Father Jehoshaphat Romanyka, Father Meletius Biłyńskiego, Father Mark Peel, as well as the monks take case of the students, the life of the province, while performing duties of the Greek Catholic parish in Warsaw. His particular attention was devoted in 1996 to a Basilian monastery and church in Zasanie in the industry to a dedicated co-worker here in the person of superior Fr Timothy Fesza.

Pope John Paul II appointed Juszczak Bishop of the Wrocław-Gdańsk Eparchy on 24 April 1999; Juszczak was enthroned on 19 June 1999.

In 2010, Juszczak was awarded the Ukrainian Order of Merit (third class), for promoting the values and culture of Ukraine and improving Ukrainian-Polish relations.

== General references ==
- "Bishop Włodzimierz Roman Juszczak [Catholic-Hierarchy]". www.catholic-hierarchy.org.
