= Church of the Dormition, Pisochna =

Church in Lviv Oblast, Ukraine

Church of the Dormition Церква Успіння Пресвятої Богородиці
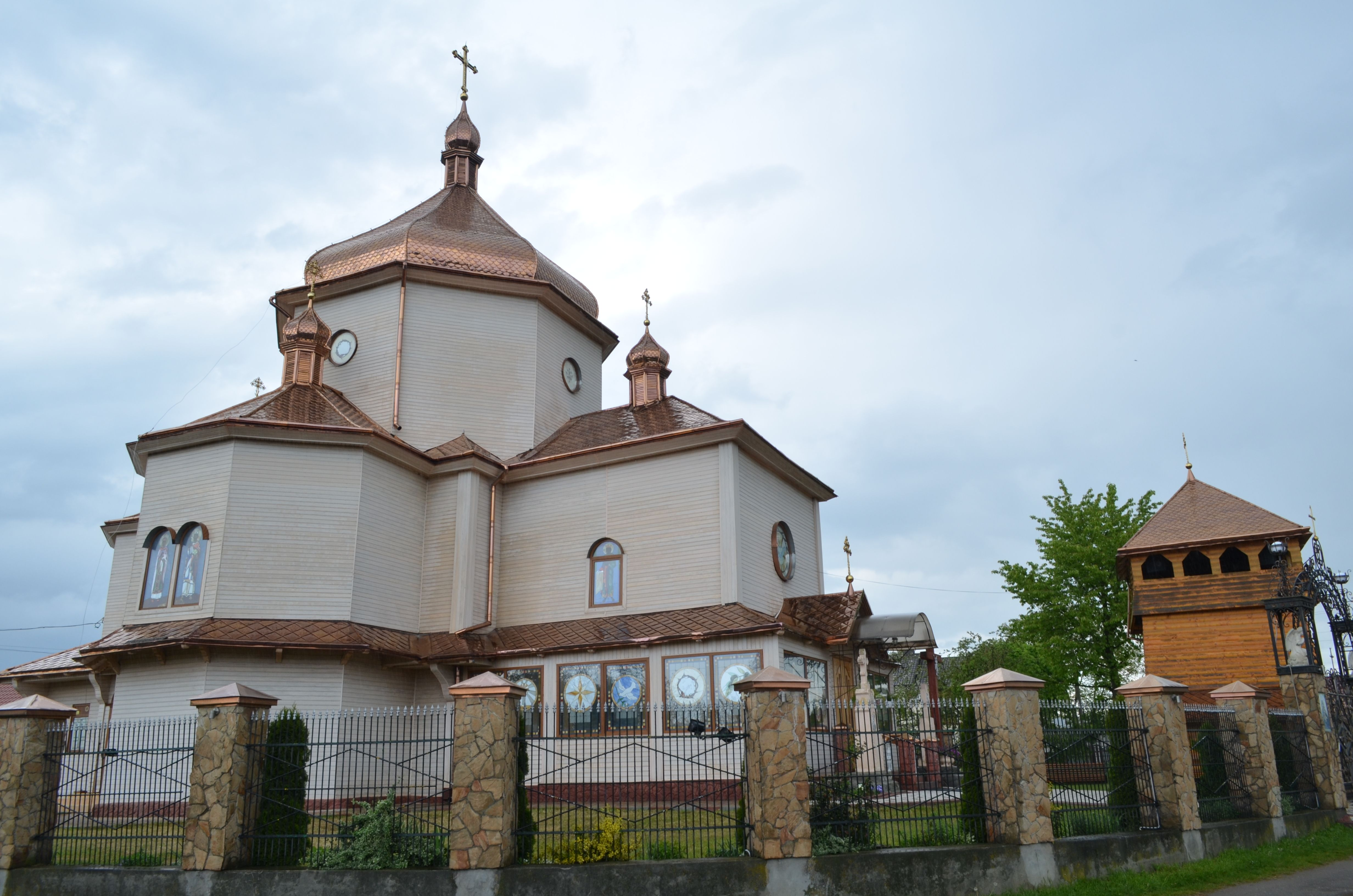

- Location within Lviv Oblast

Religion
- Affiliation: Ukrainian Greek Catholic Church

Location
- Location: Pisochna, Rozvadiv rural hromada, Stryi Raion, Lviv Oblast, Ukraine
- Coordinates: 49°27′00″N 23°58′10″E

Architecture
- Completed: 1893

Church of the Dormition (Ukrainian: Церква Успіння Пресвятої Богородиці) is a Greek Catholic parish church (UGCC) in Pisochna of the Rozvadiv rural hromada, Stryi Raion, Lviv Oblast. In the church, Mykhailo Havrylko and Olena from Hordiievskyi were married.

== History ==
The wooden church was built in 1893, replacing an old wooden church that had already existed in [1832].

The parish was visited by Auxiliary Bishop Bohdan Manyshyn (2018, 2019) and Bishop Taras Senkiv Ukrainian Catholic Eparchy of Stryi (2019, 2020, 2021, 2023).

The parish has a community "Moms In Prayer" (2008) and the Spiritual and Educational Center named after Fr. Markiian Shashkevych (2019). From 2018, the relics of St. Nicholas the Wonderworker (transported from Florence, Italy) have been kept in the church.

Number of parishioners: 1832 – 747, 1844 – 752, 1854 – 815, 1864 – 794, 1874 – 906, 1884 – 1.037, 1894 – 1.030, 1904 – 976. 1914 – 1.192, 1924 – 1.287, 1936 – 1.352.

== Priests ==
- Hryhorii Piasetskyi ([1832]–1856),
- Mykola Verhanovskyi (1855),
- Klymentii Levytskyi (1856–1857, administrator),
- Ivan Konstantynovych (1857–1865+),
- Dmytro Strotskyi (1865–1866),
- Maksym Strumynskyi (1866–1867, administrator),
- Atanasii Stakhurskyi (1867–1895+),
- Petro Petrytsia (1895–1897, administrator),
- Vasyl Kuzmych (1897–1921+),
- Omelian Kalyniuk (1922–[1944]),
- Dr. Volodymyr Zhdan (from 2017),
- Taras Babii (2017–2021, staff),
- Mykola Yatskiv (2018–2021, staff),
- Bohdan Kotsan (from 2021, staff member).

== Sources ==
- "Пісочна". Дерев'яні церкви Західної України.
- Галина Терещук (2010-02-01). "У селі Пісочна найвища народжуваність і школа, яка руйнується". Радіо Свобода.
