= Trostianets (disambiguation) =

Trostianets is a city in Sumy Oblast, Ukraine.

Trostianets or Troscianiec may also refer to other places in Ukraine:

== Railway stations ==
- Trostianets-Smorodyne railway station, Southern Railways station

== Raions ==
- Trostianets Raion, Vinnytsia Oblast, a former raion
- Trostyanets Raion, Sumy Oblast, a former raion

== Urban settlements ==
- Trostianets, Vinnytsia Oblast

== Hromadas ==
- Trostianets rural hromada, Lviv Oblast

== Villages ==
- Trostianets, Saranchuky rural hromada, Ternopil Raion, Ternopil Oblast
- Trostianets, Stryi Raion, Lviv Oblast
- Trostianets, Odesa Oblast, in Rozdilna Raion
- Trostianets, Volyn Oblast, in Lutsk Raion
- Trostianets, Zaliztsi settlement hromada, Ternopil Raion, Ternopil Oblast
- Trostianets, Zolochiv Raion, Lviv Oblast, Zolochiv Raion, Lviv Oblast
- Trostianets Velykyi, Poltava Raion, Poltava Oblast
