= Pisochna =

Rural locality in Lviv Oblast, Ukraine

Pisochna Пісочна
- Location in Lviv Oblast Pisochna (Lviv Oblast)
- Coordinates: 49°26′45″N 23°58′10″E
- Country: Ukraine
- Oblast: Lviv Oblast
- Raion: Stryi Raion
- Hromada: Rozvadiv rural hromada
- Time zone: UTC+2 (EET)
  - Summer (DST): UTC+3 (EEST)
- Postal code: 81640

Pisochna (Ukrainian: Пісочна) is a village in the Rozvadiv rural hromada of the Stryi Raion of Lviv Oblast in Ukraine.

== History ==
This village has been known from the seventh century.

After the liquidation of the Mykolaiv Raion on 19 July 2020, the village became part of the Stryi Raion.

== Religion ==
- Church of the Dormition (1893, wooden, UGCC; it was the place where Mykhailo Havrylko and Olena from Hordiievskyi got married).

== Monuments ==
- Memorial Cross of Freedom of Ukraine (1917, consecrated by Metropolitan Andrei Sheptytskyi; restored in 2017).

== Notable residents ==
- Vasyl Shved (born 1971), Ukrainian footballer
