= TSMU =

TSMU may stand for:

- Tbilisi State Medical University, a medical university in Tbilisi, Georgia
- Ternopil State Medical University, a medical university in Ternopil, Ukraine
