= Dobriany, Trostianets rural hromada, Stryi Raion, Lviv Oblast =

Rural locality in Lviv Oblast, Ukraine

Dobriany Добряни
- Village
- Location within Lviv Oblast
- Coordinates: 49°37′16″N 23°57′3″E
- Country: Ukraine
- Oblast: Lviv Oblast
- District: Stryi Raion
- District: Trostianets rural hromada
- Established: 1439

Area
  - Total: 1.21 km^{2} (0.47 sq mi)
- Elevation: 288 m (945 ft)

Population (2001)
  - Total: 366
- Time zone: UTC+2 (EET)
  - Summer (DST): UTC+3 (EEST)
- Postal code: 81610
- Area code: +380 3241

Dobriany (Ukrainian: Добряни) is a village in Stryi Raion, Lviv Oblast in western Ukraine. It belongs to Trostianets rural hromada, one of the hromadas of Ukraine.

Until 18 July 2020, Dobriany was located in Mykolaiv Raion. The raion was abolished in July 2020 as part of the administrative reform of Ukraine, which reduced the number of raions of Lviv Oblast to seven. The area of Mykolaiv Raion was merged into Stryi Raion.

The Dobriany Monastery was once located on the village's lands.
