= Taras Senkiv (bishop) =

Ukrainian Greek-Catholic hierarch

Taras Senkiv, O.M.
- Eparchial Bishop of Ukrainian Catholic Eparchy of Stryi
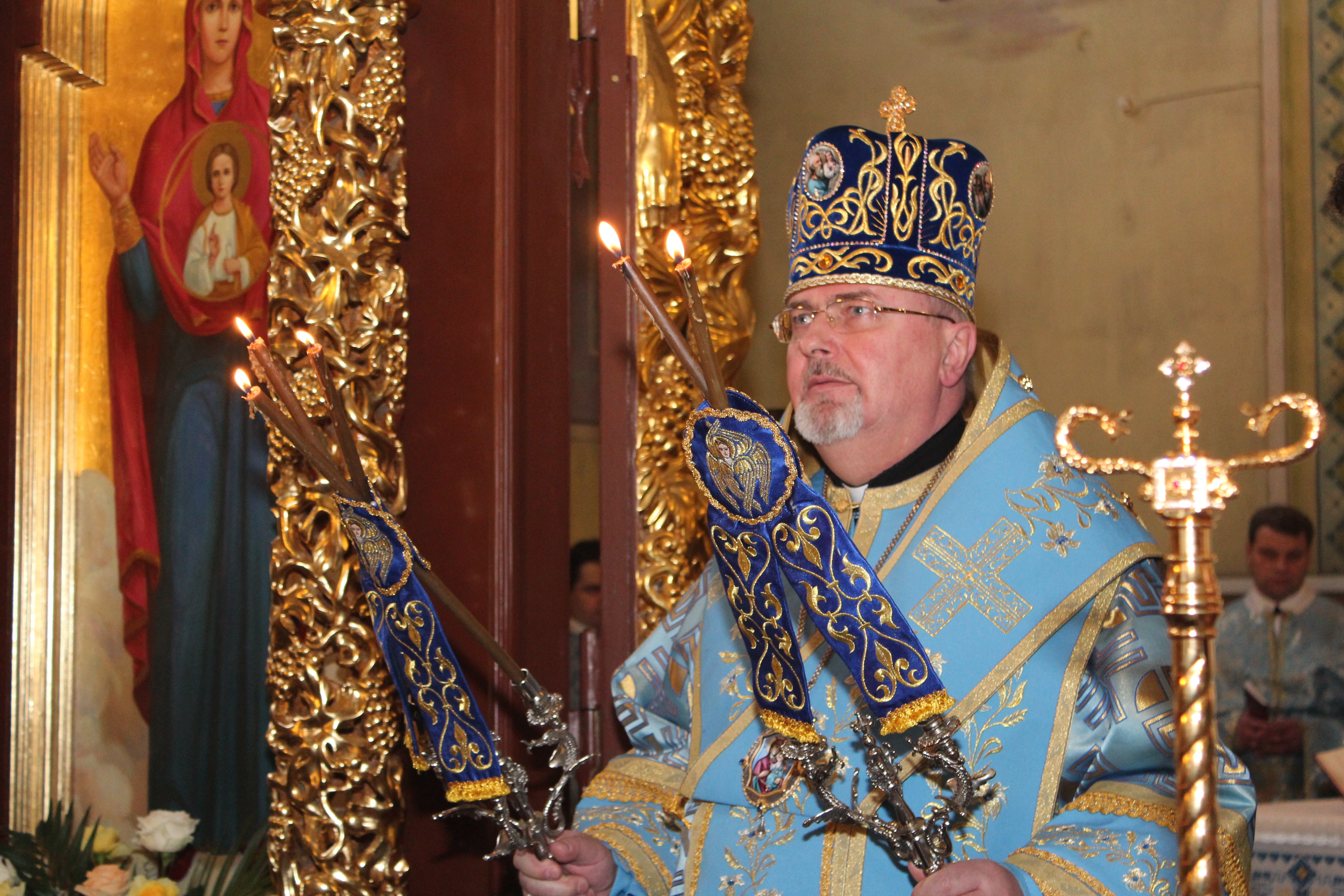
- Church: Ukrainian Greek Catholic Church
- Appointed: 20 January 2010 (as Apostolic Administrator); 2 April 2014 (as Bishop)
- Predecessor: Julian Gbur
- Successor: Incumbent
- Other posts: Auxiliary Bishop of Stryi (2008–2010); Titular Bishop of Siccenna (2008–2014)

Orders
- Ordination: 28 May 1982 (Priest) by Pavlo Vasylyk
- Consecration: 20 July 2008 (Bishop) by Lubomyr Husar

Personal details
- Born: Taras Pavlovych Senkiv; 3 July 1960 (age 66) Bilobozhnytsia, Chortkiv Raion, Ternopil Oblast, Ukrainian SSR

Bishop Taras Senkiv, O.M. (Ukrainian: Тарас Сеньків; born 3 July 1960 in Bilobozhnytsia, Chortkiv Raion, Ternopil Oblast, Ukrainian SSR) is a Ukrainian Greek Catholic hierarch as an Eparchial Bishop of Ukrainian Catholic Eparchy of Stryi since 2 June 2005 (until 21 November 2011 in rank of Eparchial Bishop). Previously he served as an Auxiliary Bishop of Stryi from 22 May 2008 until 20 January 2010 and as an Apostolic Administrator of the same Stryi from 20 January 2010 until 2 April 2014 as a Titular Bishop of Siccenna.

Coat of arms of Bishop Taras Senkiv

== Life ==
Bishop Senkiv was born in a family of clandestine Greek-Catholics in Western Ukraine. He joined a clandestine theological seminary at age 17, simultaneously working various jobs.

He was clandestinely ordained as priest by Bishop Pavlo Vasylyk on May 28, 1982, and worked as pastor among the faithful of the "Catacomb Church" until 1989, mainly in Western Ukraine. From 1989 until 1992 he served as Dean of Chortkiv Deanery and from 2001 until 2002 as a Synkellos of the Ukrainian Catholic Eparchy of Buchach. During 1992–2000 Fr. Senkiv continued his theological studies in the Theological Seminary in Olomouc, Czech Republic and Palacký University in the same city, obtaining a licentiate degree in theology. On February 15, 2002, he joined the religious order of Minims in Italy and was professed on October 1, 2006.

On May 22, 2008, Fr. Senkiv was appointed and on July 20, 2008, was consecrated to the Episcopate as the Auxiliary Bishop of the Ukrainian Catholic Eparchy of Stryi. The principal consecrator was Cardinal Lubomyr Husar, the Head of the Ukrainian Greek Catholic Church.

Catholic Church titles
Preceded by nobody	Auxiliary Bishop of Stryi; 2008–2010	Succeeded by Bohdan Manyshyn
Preceded by Julian Gbur	Apostolic Administrator of Stryi; 2010–2014	Succeeded by himself as Eparchial Bishop
Preceded by himself as Apostolic Administrator	Eparchial Bishop of Stryi; 2014–present	Succeeded by Incumbent
