= Derzhiv =

Rural locality in Lviv Oblast, Ukraine

Derzhiv Держів
- Village
- Location within Lviv Oblast
- Coordinates: 49°24′11″N 23°59′35″E
- Country: Ukraine
- Oblast: Lviv Oblast
- District: Stryi Raion
- Established: 1550

Area
  - Total: 1,840 km^{2} (710 sq mi)
- Elevation /(average value of): 259 m (850 ft)

Population
  - Total: 1,204
  - Density: 654,350/km^{2} (1,694,800/sq mi)
- Time zone: UTC+2 (EET)
  - Summer (DST): UTC+3 (EEST)
- Postal code: 81645
- Area code: +380 3241
- Website: село Держів ^{(Ukrainian)}

Derzhiv (Ukrainian: Де́ржів) is a village (selo) in Stryi Raion, Lviv Oblast, of western Ukraine. It belongs to Rozvadiv rural hromada, one of the hromadas of Ukraine. The village covers an area of 1,840 km^{2} and about 1204 persons is currently living in the village.

Local government is administered by Derzhivska village council.

== Geography ==
Derzhiv is located on the right bank of the Dniester River at a distance of 4 kilometres (2.5 mi) from the railway station "Bilche - Volytsya". It is situated 58 kilometres (36 mi) from the regional center of Lviv, 22 kilometres (14 mi) from Mykolaiv, and 21 kilometres (13 mi) from Stryi.

== History ==
The first mention of Derzhiv dates from writings of the year 1550. Finds in and around the location of the village give evidence of settlements around the end of the Bronze Age (13th-11th centuries BC. E.).

Until 18 July 2020, Derzhiv belonged to Mykolaiv Raion. The raion was abolished in July 2020 as part of the administrative reform of Ukraine, which reduced the number of raions of Lviv Oblast to seven. The area of Mykolaiv Raion was merged into Stryi Raion.

== Literature ==
- Ukrainian: Історія міст і сіл УРСР : Львівська область. – К. : ГРУРЕ, 1968 р. Page 471
