= Demnia, Lviv Oblast =

Village in Lviv Oblast, Ukraine

Demnia Демня
- Village
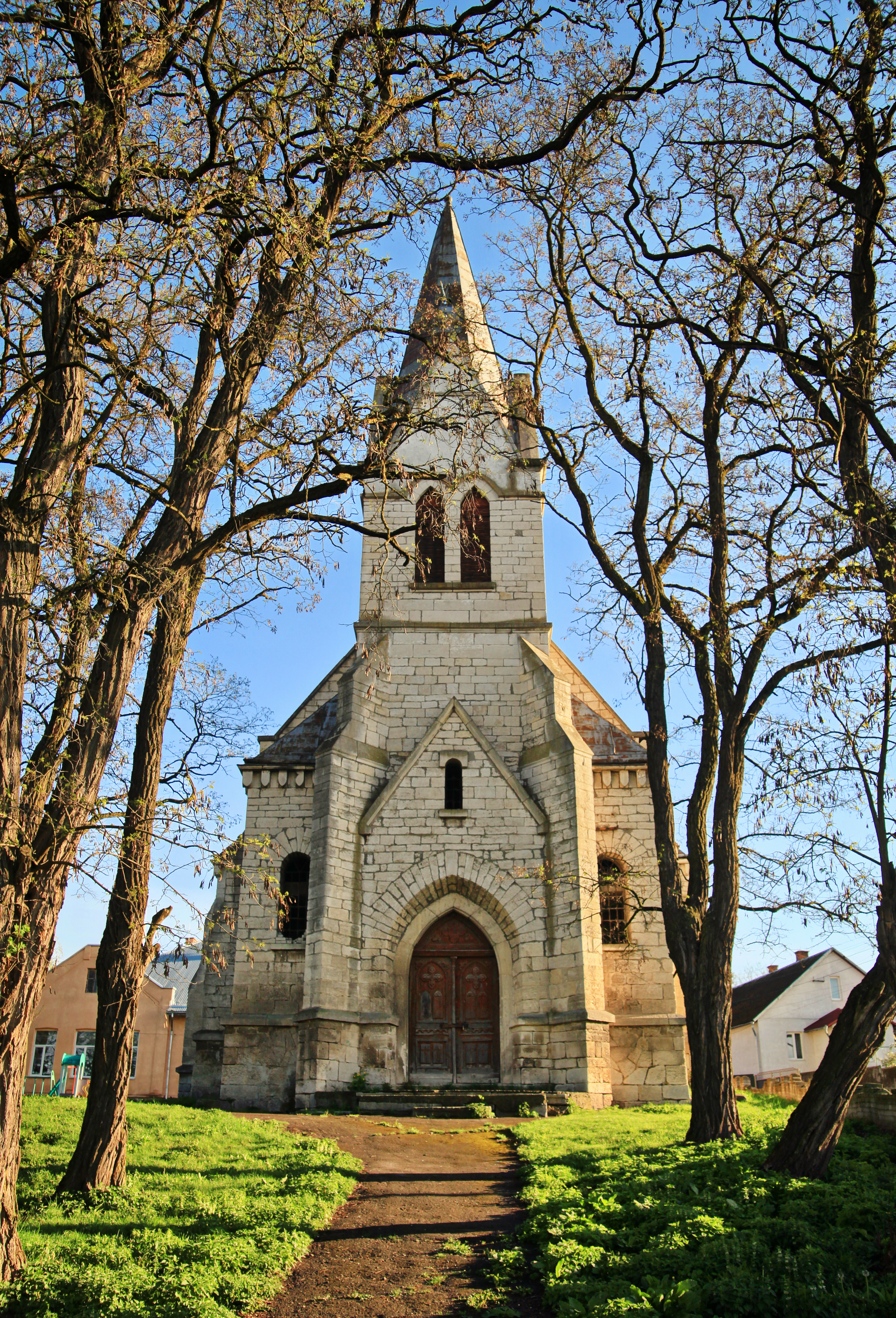
- Catholic Church of Our Lady of Częstochowa

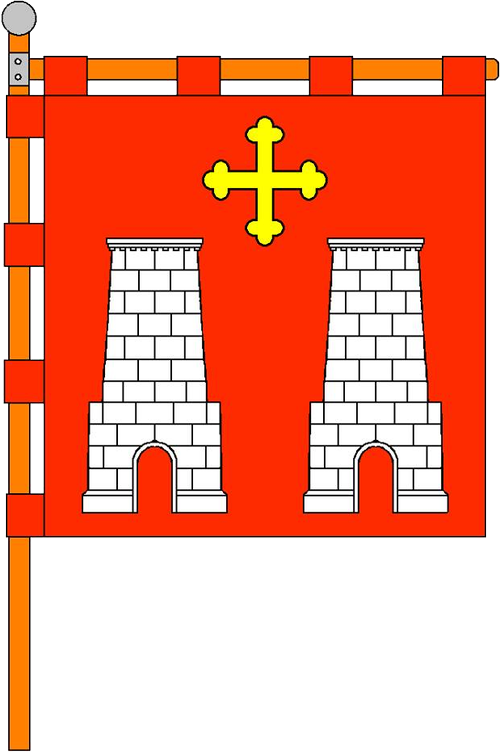
- Flag Coat of arms

- Location in Lviv Oblast Demnia (Ukraine)
- Coordinates: 49°34′5″N 23°57′8″E
- Country: Ukraine
- Oblast: Lviv Oblast
- Raion: Stryi Raion
- Hromada: Trostianets rural hromada
- Time zone: UTC+2 (EET)
  - Summer (DST): UTC+3 (EEST)
- Postal code: 81613

Demnia (Ukrainian: Демня) is a village in the Trostianets rural hromada of the Stryi Raion of Lviv Oblast in Ukraine.

== History ==
The first written mention of the village was in 1453.

In the Second Polish Republic, until 1934, the village constituted an independent rural municipality (gmina) within the Żydaczów County of the Stanisławów Voivodeship. As part of the consolidation reform, on August 1, 1934, it was incorporated into the newly established rural Mikołajów nad Dniestrem in the same county and voivodeship.

In April 1944, Ukrainian nationalists from the OUN-UPA murdered 13 Poles here, while looting Polish households, part of Volhynia genocide.

After the war, the village became part of the administrative structures of the Soviet Union.

On 19 July 2020, as a result of the administrative-territorial reform and liquidation of the Mykolaiv Raion, the village became part of the Stryi Raion.

== Religion ==
- Saint Nicholas Church (1857)
- Church of Our Lady of Częstochowa (1913)

== Notable residents ==
- Volodymyr Kotovych (1877–1948), Ukrainian military leader. Ataman of the Ukrainian Galician Army.
- Mykhailo Khudash (1925–2011), Ukrainian linguist, Doctor of Philology
- Tryfon Yaniv (1888–1920), General-khorunzhyi of the Ukrainian People's Republic Army
- Yevhen Dzyndra (1913–1983), Ukrainian sculptor, teacher, public figure
- Stanisława Klimkowska-Bieńkowska (1896–1996), an artist, painter, and medic during the battle for Lviv in 1918, was born in Demnia.
- Liubomyr Podfedko (1987–2015), Ukrainian soldier

== Bibliography ==
- "Demnia (2)". Geographical Dictionary of the Kingdom of Poland (in Polish). 1. Warszawa: Kasa im. Józefa Mianowskiego. 1880. p. 956.
