= Veryn =

Rural locality in Lviv Oblast, Ukraine

Veryn Верин
- Village
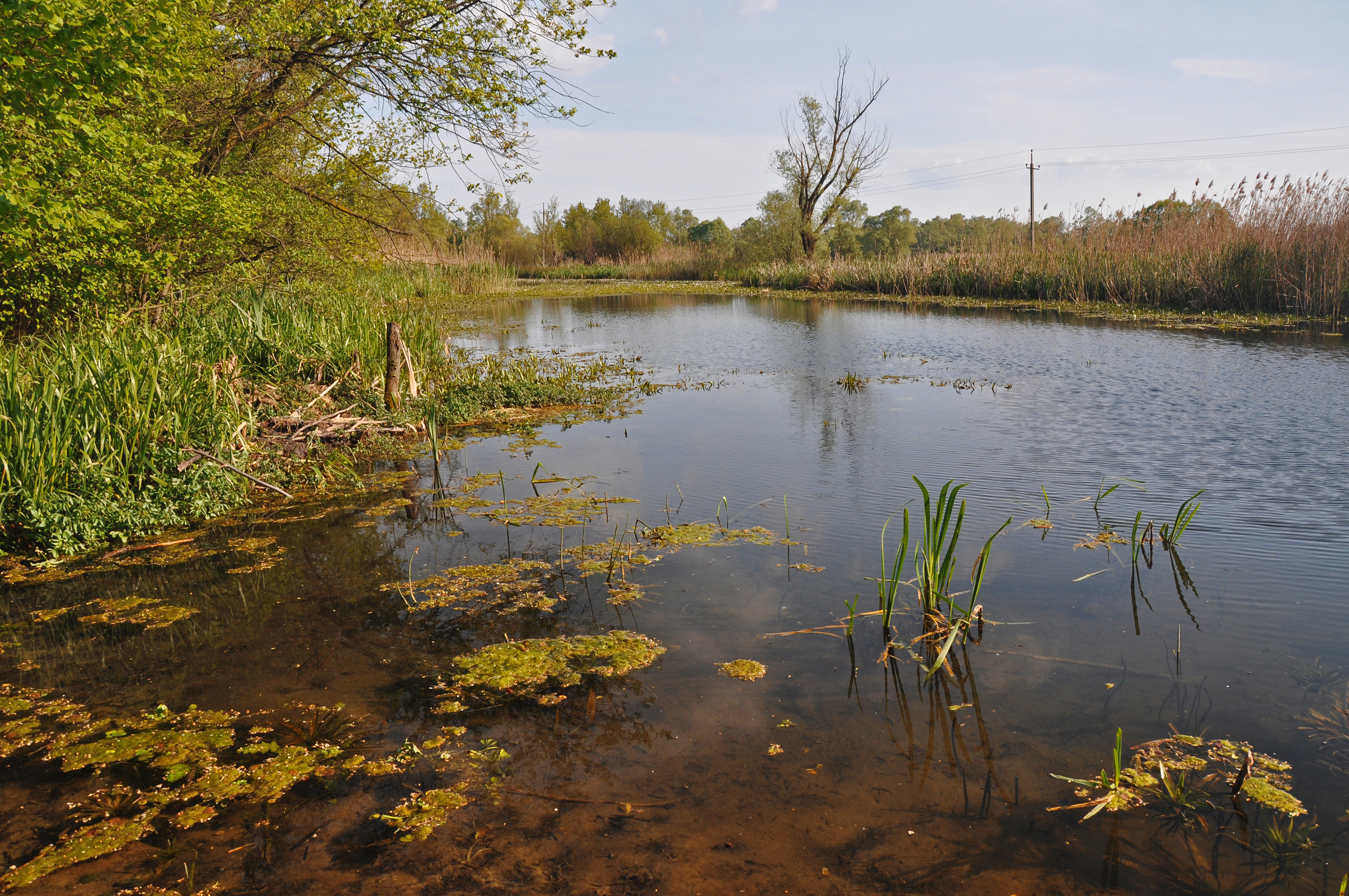

- Location within Lviv Oblast
- Coordinates: 49°29′04″N 23°59′25″E
- Country: Ukraine
- Oblast: Lviv Oblast
- District: Stryi Raion
- Established: 1451

Area
  - Total: 152 km^{2} (59 sq mi)
- Elevation /(average value of): 259 m (850 ft)

Population
  - Total: 1,642
  - Density: 110,526/km^{2} (286,260/sq mi)
- Time zone: UTC+2 (EET)
  - Summer (DST): UTC+3 (EEST)
- Postal code: 81635
- Area code: +380 3241

Veryn (Ukrainian: Верин) is a village (selo) in Stryi Raion, Lviv Oblast, of western Ukraine. It belongs to Rozvadiv rural hromada, one of the hromadas of Ukraine. The village covers an area of 1,52 km^{2} and is currently living in the village of about 1642 persons (in 2017).

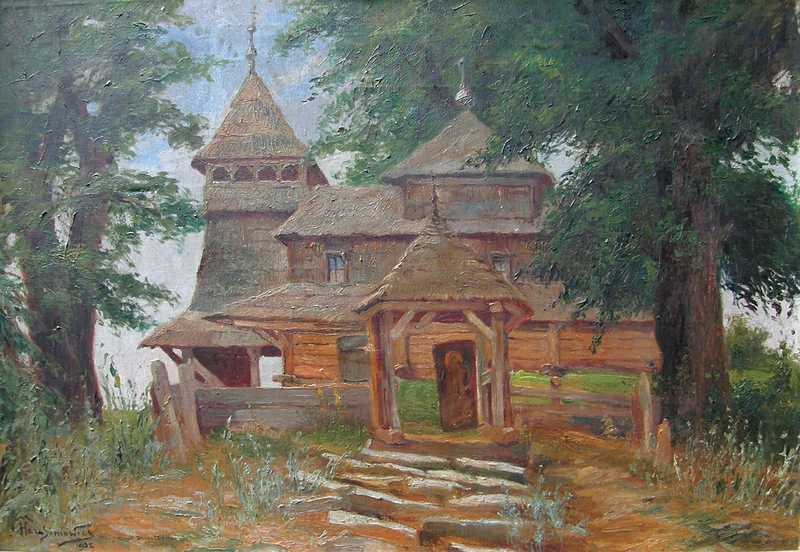

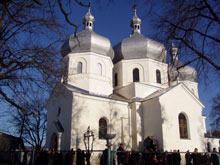
Church

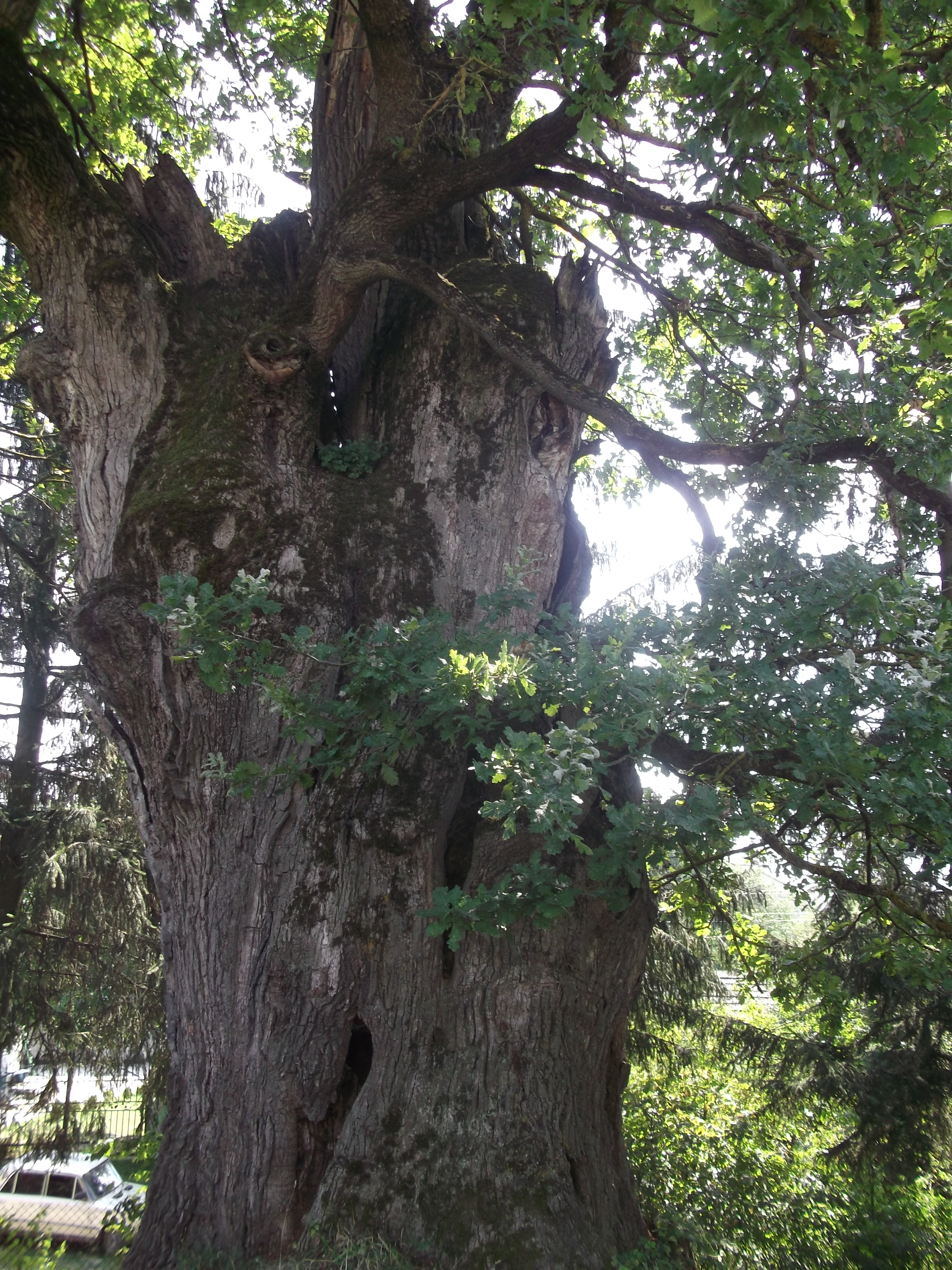
Oak (nature heritage)

== People ==
- Mykhailo Korda - Ukrainian scientist in the field medical biochemistry, Doctor of Sciences in Medicine, Corresponding Member of the National Academy of Sciences of Ukraine, Honored Science and Technology Figure of Ukraine, Rector of I. Horbachevsky Ternopil National Medical University.
