= Mykhailo Korda =

Ukrainian scientist

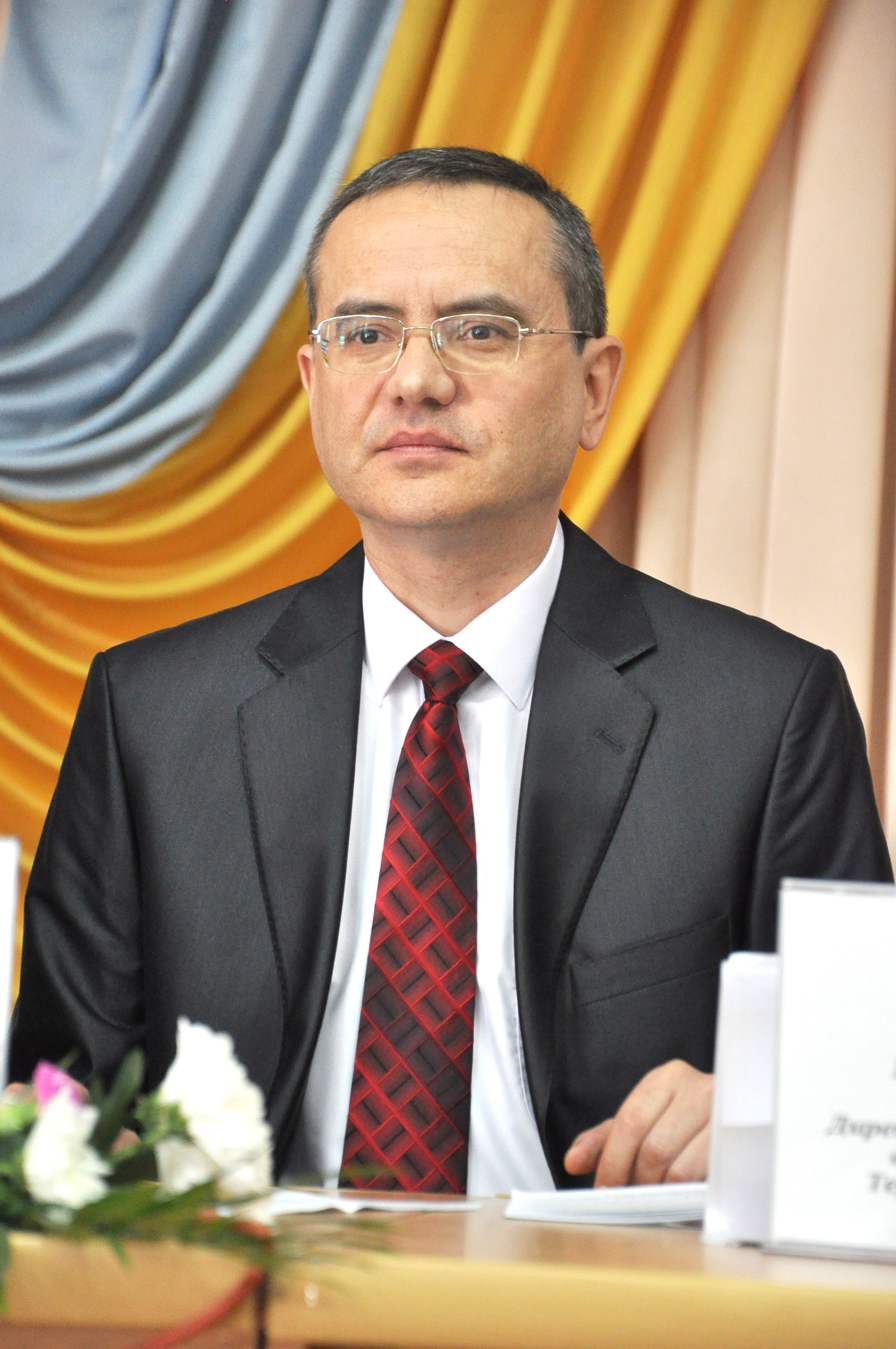
- Born: 13 February 1965; Veryn, Mykolaiv Raion Lviv Oblast, Ukraine
- Citizenship: Ukraine
- Education: Ternopil National Medical University
- Awards: Order of Merit, III degree, Honored Science and Technology Figure of Ukraine
- Scientific career
- Fields: Medicine
- Workplaces: Ternopil National Medical University

Mykhailo Mykhailovych Korda (Ukrainian: Михайло Михайлович Корда; born February 13, 1965, Veryn, Mykolaiv Raion, Lviv Oblast, Ukraine) is a Ukrainian scientist in the field medical biochemistry, Doctor of Sciences in Medicine (1998), Professor (2002), Corresponding Member of the National Academy of Sciences of Ukraine., Honored Science and Technology Figure of Ukraine (2017), Rector of I. Horbachevsky Ternopil National Medical University (since January 2015).

== Biography ==
=== Early life and education ===
Mykhaylo Korda was born on February 13, 1965, in the village of Veryn, Mykolaiv Raion, Lviv Oblast.

In 1982, Mykhaylo Korda enrolled at Ternopil State Medical Institute where he majored in “General Medicine”. After graduating in 1988, he received diploma with honors and qualification of a medical doctor.

=== Career ===
Since December 1988, Mykhaylo Korda’s research, academic and public activities have been connected with Ternopil National Medical University. M. Korda began his academic career at the Department of Medical Biochemistry, where he walked the path from a post-graduate student to professor and ultimately the head of the department. He was appointed as the head of the department in 2002. In 2003-2004, M. Korda worked as a research associate and in 2004-2007, as a visiting professor of the Department of Chemistry and Biochemistry at Ohio State University (USA). In 2007-2014, Mykhaylo Korda returned to Ternopil Medical University as the head of the Department of Medical Biochemistry and Clinical Laboratory Diagnostics simultaneously working as the dean of the International Students Faculty.

In January 2015, Mykhaylo Korda was elected Rector of I. Horbachevsky Ternopil State (now National) Medical University.

=== Personal life ===
M. Korda is married to Inna Volodymyrivna Korda, PhD in Medicine, Associate Professor of the Department of Obstetrics and Gynecology No. 2 of I. Horbachevsky Ternopil National Medical University.

== Research ==
In 1991, M. Korda defended his PhD degree dissertation on the topic “Antioxidant status of an organism with acute toxic damage to the liver and its correction by enterosorption and antioxidants” in specialty 14.00.16 – Pathological Physiology.

In 1998, he defended his doctoral dissertation on the topic “Violation of oxidative processes and protective body systems in acute chemical injury of the liver and the ways of their correction” in specialty 03.14.04 – Pathological Physiology.

Research interests: biochemistry of free radicals; hepatotoxicology; the role of nitric oxide in pathologies of the cardiovascular system; mechanisms of endothelial dysfunction in obesity, hypertension and atherosclerosis, COVID-19, nanotoxicology, application of nanomaterials in medicine and pharmacy, borreliosis epidemiology, pathogenesis and treatment.

Mykhaylo Korda has authored and co-authored more than 520 scientific papers, 4 textbooks, 16 educational and methodical manuals, 15 monographs, 40 patents.

M. Korda has repeatedly participated in international conferences as an invited speaker, in particular, in the USA, Japan, Korea, Germany, Poland. He initiated a number of all-Ukrainian research and training conferences devoted to current problems of medical biochemistry.

Mykhaylo Korda is a chairman of the specialized academic board D 58.601.01 and a member of the specialized academic board K 58.601.04.

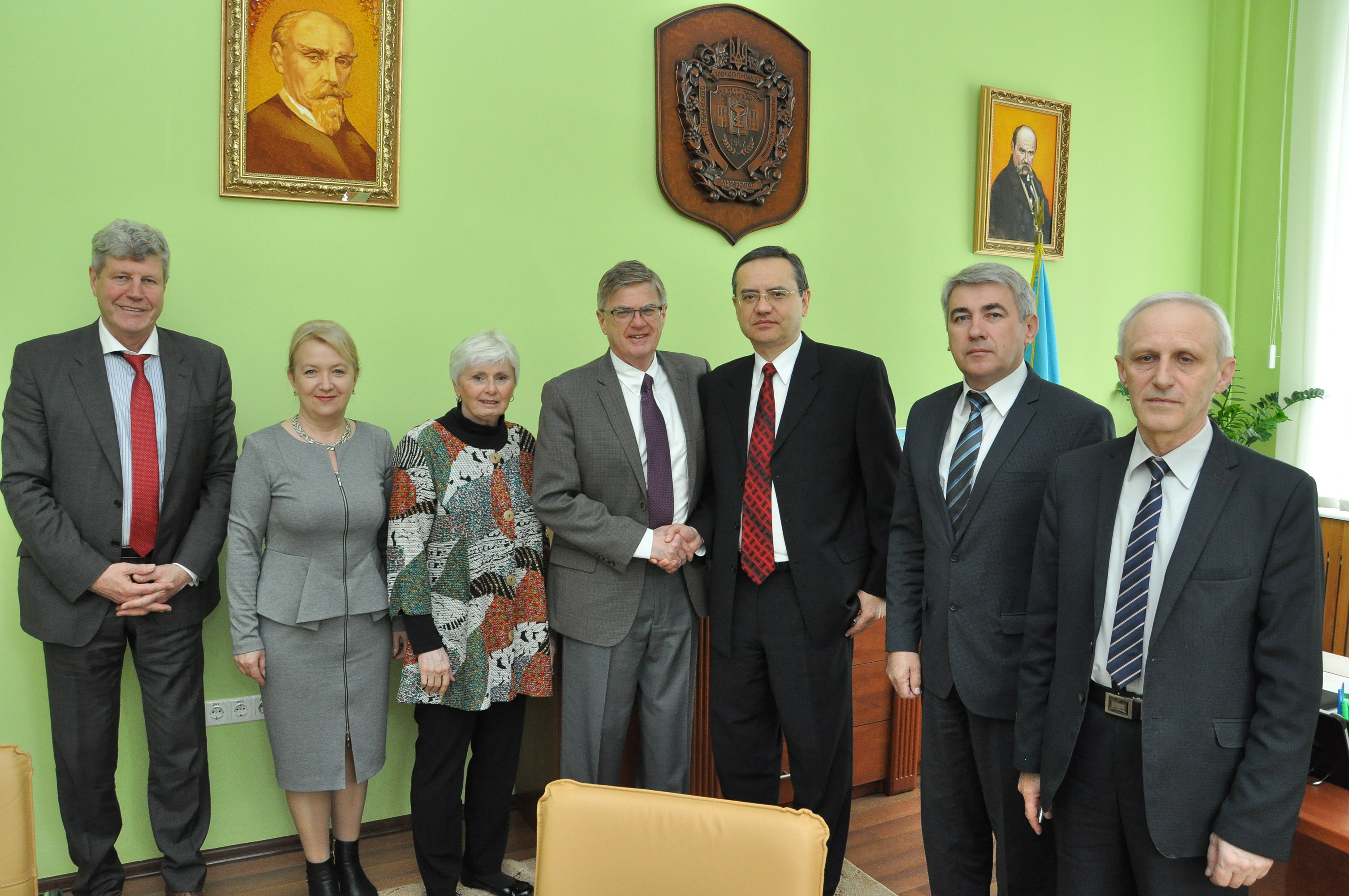
Mykhaylo Korda and President of Grant MacEwan University David Atkinson (in the middle)

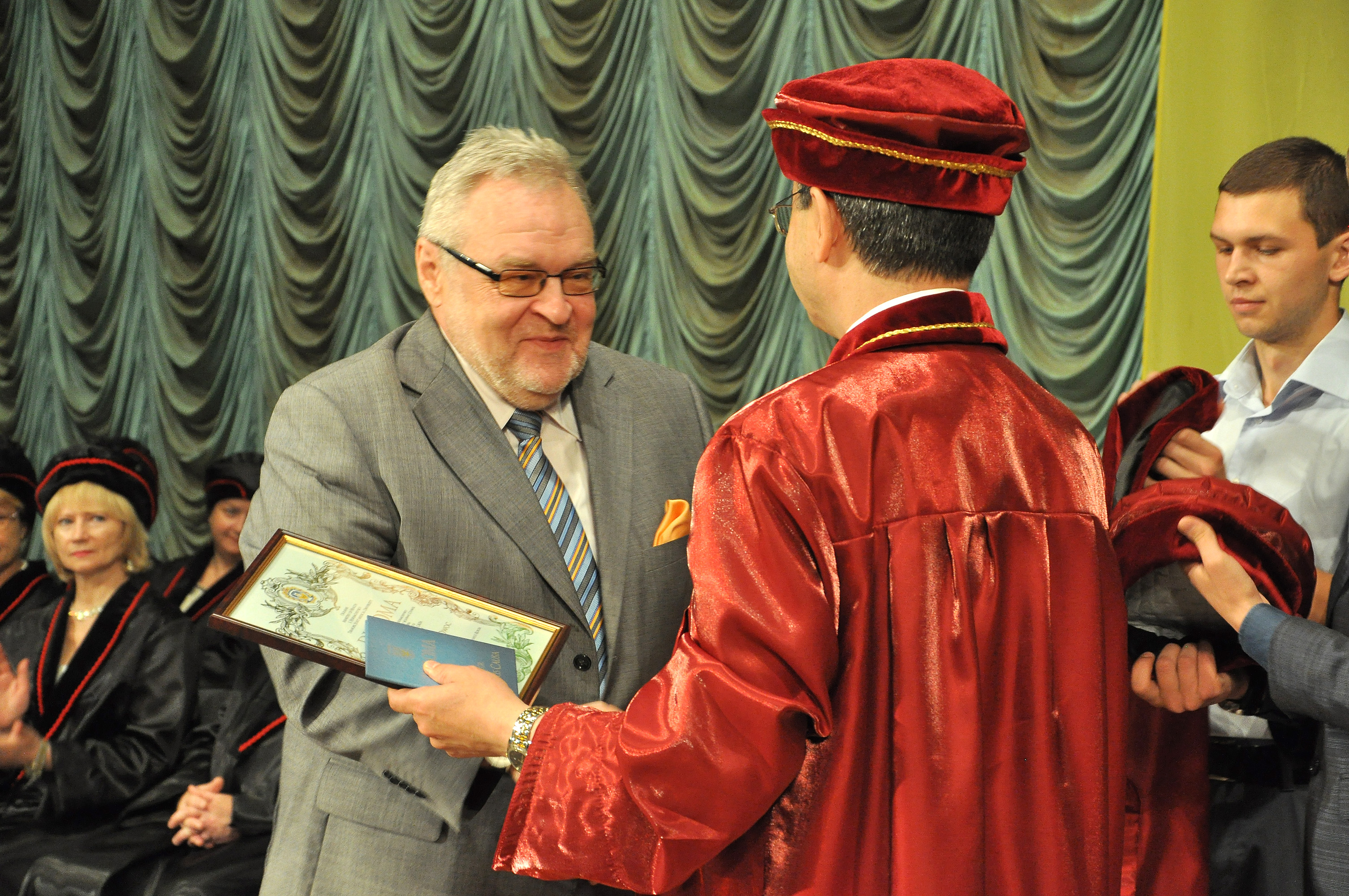
Mykhaylo Korda presenting a diploma of honorary professor of TNMU to Alfred Owoc

== Editorial and public activities ==
Mykhaylo Mykhaylovych Korda is active in public work, in particular, he is:

- member of the presidium of the Ukrainian Biochemical Society;
- head of the Ternopil regional branch of the Ukrainian Biochemical Society;
- member of the medical sector of the Committee for State Awards of Ukraine in the field of science and technology;
- chief editor of the journal “Medical and Clinical Chemistry” (Ukraine);
- chief editor of the “International Journal of Medicine and Medical Research” (Ukraine);
- member of the editorial board of the journal “Social, Health, and Communication Studies Journal” (Canada);
- member of the editorial board of the journal “Health Problems of Civilization” (Poland);
- member of the editorial board of the journal “Merkuriusz Lekarski” (Poland);
- member of the board of the Eurasian Alliance for Global Health;
- member of the Ukrainian-German Academic Society.

== Awards ==
- Order of Merit, III degree.
- Certificate of Honor and Commemorative Sign of the Cabinet of Ministers of Ukraine (2009).
- Honored Science and Technology Figure of Ukraine (January 21, 2017).
- Certificates of appreciation from the Ministry of Health of Ukraine, Ternopil Oblast State Administration, Ternopil Regional and City Councils.
- Award of the Ministry of Defense of Ukraine “Badge of Honor”.
- Certificate of appreciation from the Ministry of Internal Affairs of Ukraine.
- Badge of honor of the National Academy of Medical Sciences of Ukraine (2017).
- Medal of Honor of the Federation of Trade Unions of Ukraine (2017).
- Order of St. Equal-to-Apostles Prince Volodymyr the Great, III degree (2017).
- Order of St. Archangel Michael, II degree.
- Award of Holy Great Martyr and Healer Pantaleon.
- Gold award “For services to the Higher School named after Pope John Paul II” (2016, Poland).
- Honorary professor of Samarkand State Medical Institute (2017).
- Honorary professor of Pope John Paul II State School of Higher Education in Biała Podlaska (2018).
- Badge “Order of the First Degree” of the King Danylo Foundation (2018).
- “Medal for work and achievement in medicine” (2018).
- Volodymyr Luchakivskyi Award (2021)
