= Ternopillia =

Rural locality in Lviv Oblast, Ukraine

Ternopillia Тернопілля
- Village
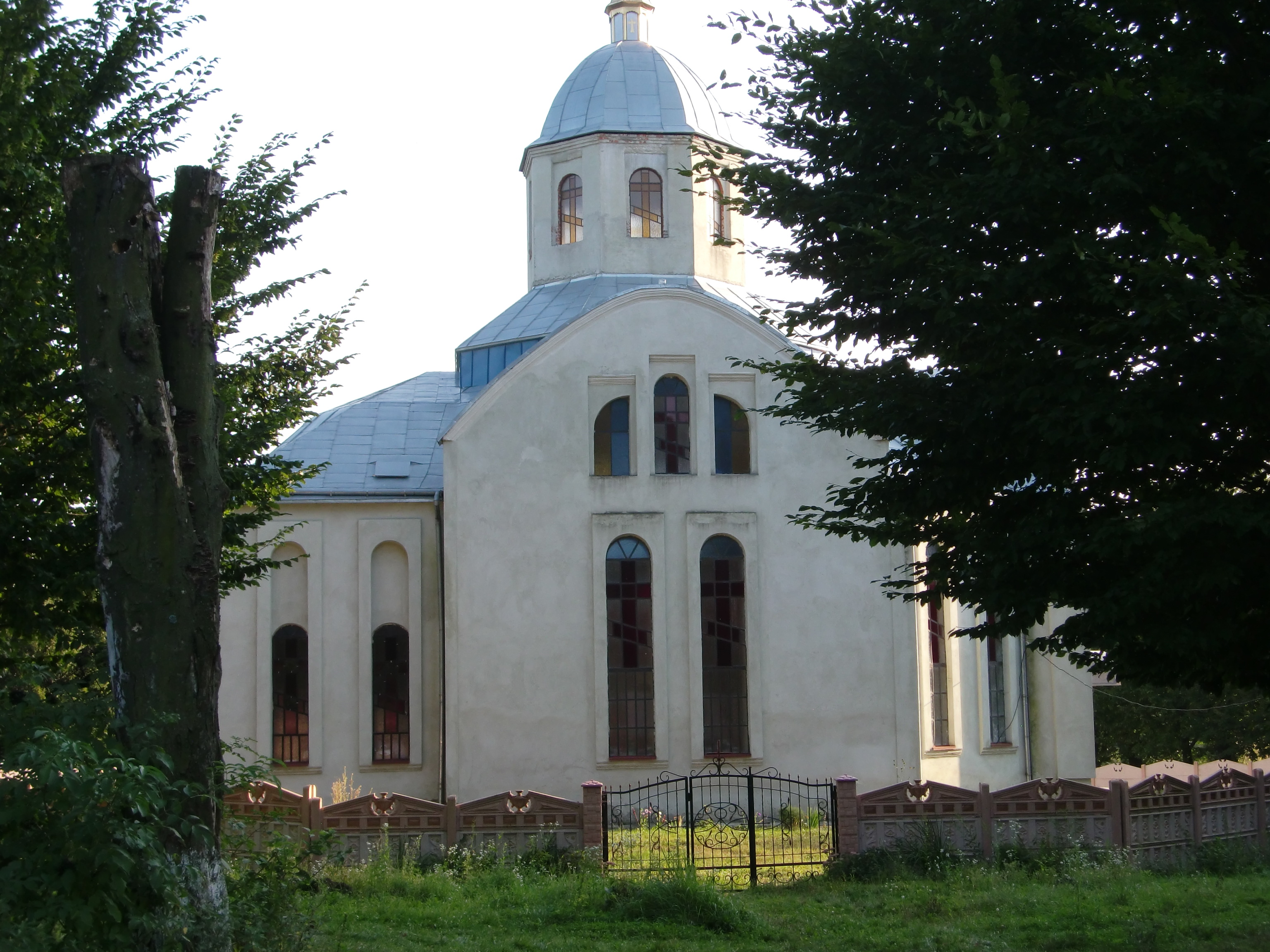
- New Orthodox church

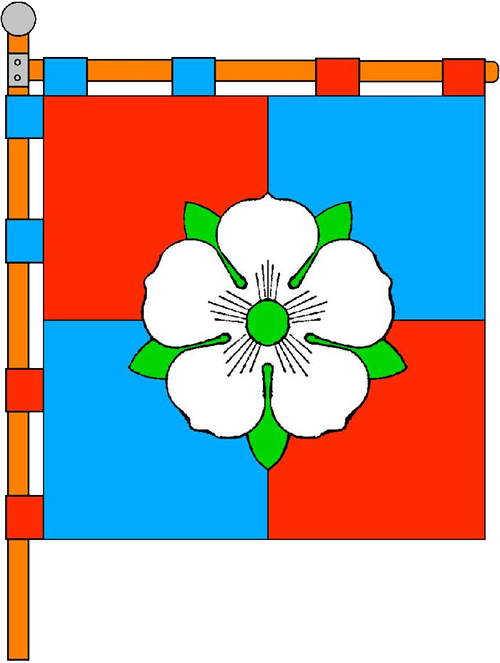
- Flag Coat of arms

- Location within Lviv Oblast Location within Ukraine
- Coordinates: 49°37′46″N 23°56′40″E
- Country: Ukraine
- Oblast: Lviv
- Raion: Stryi
- Area: 0.75 km^{2} (0.29 sq mi)
- Population: 473
  - Density: 630/km^{2} (1,600/sq mi)

Ternopillia (Ukrainian: Тернопі́лля, romanized: Ternopíllja, German: Dornfeld) is a village (selo) in Stryi Raion, Lviv Oblast, in south-west Ukraine. It belongs to Trostianets rural hromada, one of the hromadas of Ukraine.

The village was established in the course of Josephine colonization by German Lutheran settlers in 1786. They built a church that became a religious centre for Lutherans living in other nearby Josephine colonies.

From 1918 to 1939 the village was in Lwów Voivodeship in Poland.

Until 18 July 2020, Ternopillia belonged to Mykolaiv Raion. The raion was abolished in July 2020 as part of the administrative reform of Ukraine, which reduced the number of raions of Lviv Oblast to seven. The area of Mykolaiv Raion was merged into Stryi Raion.

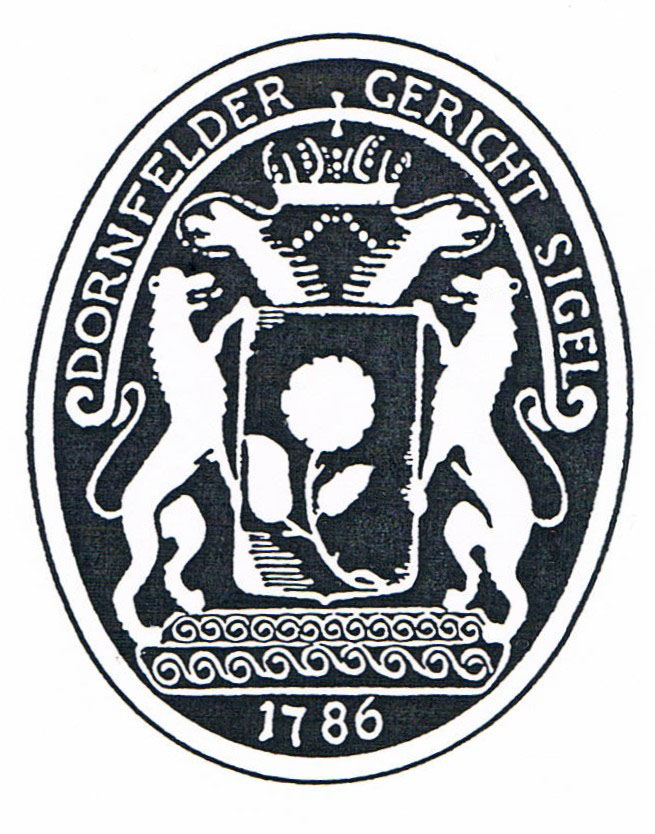
Former Coat of Arms

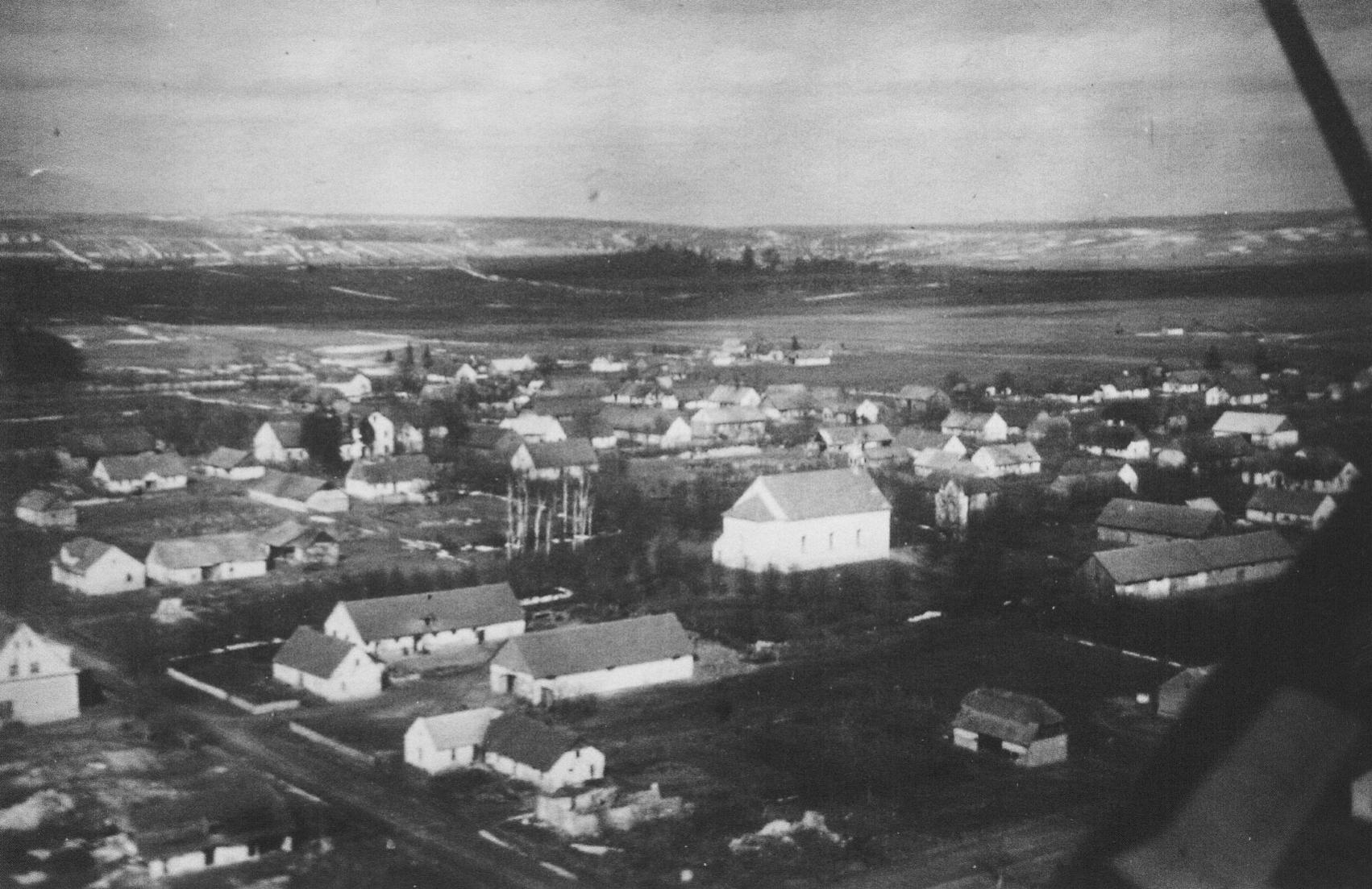
Aerial view in 1943
