= Antoni Opolski =

Polish physicist

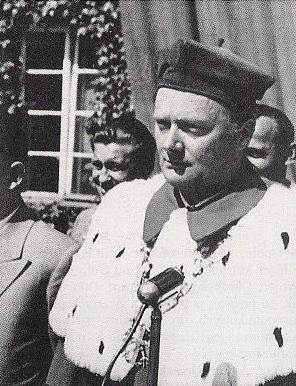
- Antoni Opolski in May 1961
- Born: 11 June 1913; Rozwadów, Galicia and Lodomeria, Austria-Hungary (now Rozvadiv, Ukraine)
- Died: 17 March 2014 (aged 100); Wrocław, Poland
- Occupation: physicist

Antoni Opolski (11 June 1913 – 17 March 2014) was a Polish physicist. His field was astronomy and astrophysics. After World War II, he worked at the astronomical observatory of the University of Wrocław. He retired in 1983. He was born in Rozwadów (now Lviv Oblast, Ukraine). He died from natural causes on 17 March 2014 in Wrocław, Poland. He was 100 years old. His funeral was held on 22 March.
