= Bohdan Manyshyn =

Ukrainian Greek Catholic bishop

- Auxiliary Bishop of Ukrainian Catholic Eparchy of Stryi
- Church: Ukrainian Greek Catholic Church
- Appointed: 2 April 2014
- Other post(s): Protosyncellus of the Eparchy of Stryi (2010–present); Titular Bishop of Lesvi (2014–present)

Orders
- Ordination: 15 September 2002 (Priest) by Julian Gbur
- Consecration: 24 May 2014 (Bishop) by Sviatoslav Shevchuk

Personal details
- Born: Bohdan Romanovych Manyshyn; 24 October 1972 (age 52); Novyi Rozdil, Lviv Oblast, Ukrainian SSR

Bishop Bohdan Manyshyn (Ukrainian: Богдан Манишин; born 24 October 1972 in Novyi Rozdil, Mykolaiv Raion, Lviv Oblast, Ukrainian SSR) is a Ukrainian Greek Catholic hierarch as Auxiliary bishop of Stryi since 2 April 2014.

== Life ==
Bishop Manyshyn, after graduation of the school education, polytechnic college and an obligatory service in the Ukrainian Army, joined the Theological Seminary in Lviv. After graduation he was ordained as deacon on 3 March 2002 and as priest on 15 September 2002, while he continued his study in the Catholic University of Lublin with license in the pastoral theology. During 2004–2014 he served as a parish priest in the different parishes of the Eparchy of Stryi.

On 2 April 2014 he was confirmed by the Pope Francis as an Auxiliary Bishop of Stryi, Ukraine and Titular Bishop of Lesvi. On 24 May 2014 he was consecrated as bishop by Major Archbishop Sviatoslav Shevchuk and other hierarchs of the Ukrainian Greek Catholic Church.
