= Mykhailo Havrylko =

Ukrainian sculptor, soldier (1882–1920)

- Михайло Гаврилко
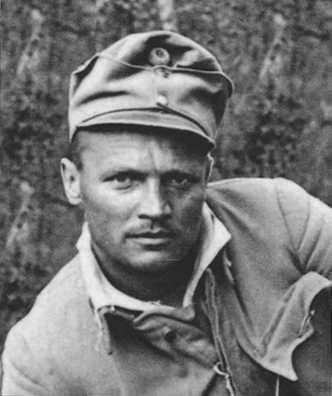
- Born: Mykhailo Omelianovych Havrylko; 5 September 1882; Kozatski Khutory near Runivshchyna, now Poltava Oblast
- Died: autumn 1920; Poltava
- Education: Kraków Academy of Arts
- Occupations: Sculptor, graphic artist, poet, and soldier
- Spouse: Olena Havrylko

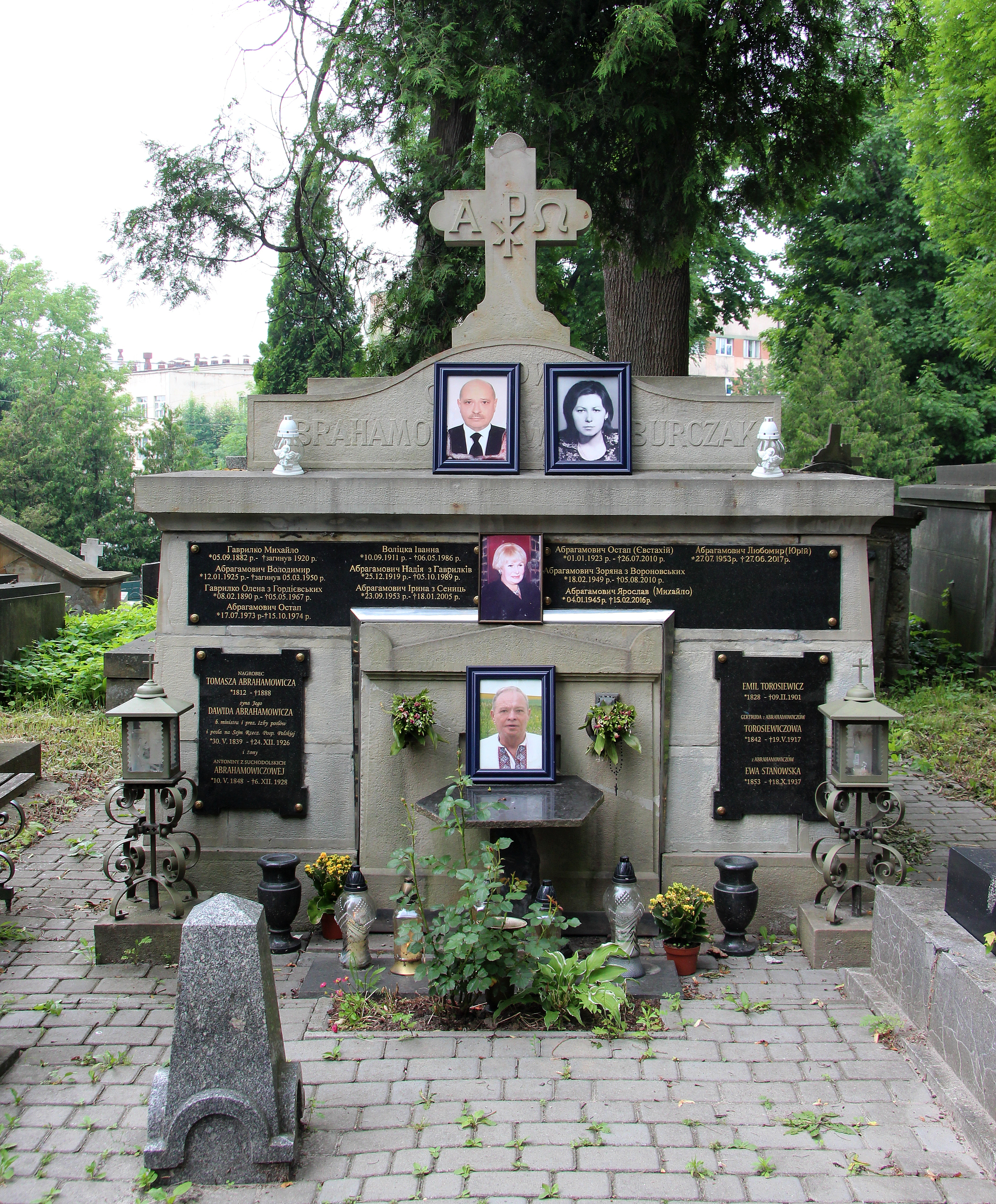
The tomb at Lychakiv Cemetery, where she is buried with her relatives

Mykhailo Omelianovych Havrylko (Ukrainian: Михайло Омелянович Гаврилко; 5 September 1882, Kozatski Khutory near Runivshchyna, now Poltava Oblast – autumn 1920, Poltava) was a Ukrainian sculptor, graphic artist, poet, and soldier. Member of the Ukrainian Social-Democratic Workers' Party, the Union for the Liberation of Ukraine (1914). Participant of the Liberation Movement as a member of the Ukrainian Sich Riflemen and the UPR Army (1915–1919).

== Biography ==
In 1904, he graduated from the Myrhorod Art and Industrial School (teacher – Opanas Slastion), in 1905 – from the St. Petersburg School of Technical Drawing, in 1912 – from the Kraków Academy of Arts (studio of Konstanty Laszczka), and trained with the sculptor Antoine Bourdelle (Paris).

From 1918, he was the head of the communication team of the 3rd Regiment of the 1st Rifle Cossack Division in Konotop. At the end of 1919 he arrived in Poltava. In the fall of 1920, he commanded an insurgent detachment near Poltava, where he was executed.

=== Family ===
In 1912, Havrylko sculpted a bust of Olena Hordiievska, whom he married on 23 September 1917; were married in the Church of the Dormition in Pisochna, Stryi Raion. They raised two daughters, Liubov-Svitlana (b. 1918) and Nadiia-Oksana (b. 1919).

== Creativity ==
Havrylko received an order from the management of the consumer cooperative to make a bust of Taras Shevchenko to be installed in the villages of Poltava Oblast. The main theme is Shevchenkiana. Participated in 4 international competitions for the design of a monument to Taras Shevchenko in Kyiv (1910 – 1st prize).

He published a poetry collection "Na rumovyschah" (1909, Kraków). Some of his works are kept in the Myrhorod Museum of Regional and the Odesa Museum of Regional History.

== See also ==
- Church of the Dormition, Pisochna

== Sources ==
- Коваль, Роман (2012). Михайло Гаврилко: і стеком, і шаблею. Вінниця: ДП "Державна картографічна фабрика". p. 472. ISBN 978-617-533-010-4.
