= Siccenna =

Siccenna was a Roman Era town and episcopal see in the Roman province of Africa Proconsularis in what is today northern Tunisia, which is now a Latin Catholic titular bishopric.

Africa Proconsularis (125 AD)

== History ==
Siccenna was also the seat of an ancient episcopal see, one of many suffragans of the Metropolitan Archdiocese of Carthage.

The only known Roman era bishop of this diocese was the African Donatist Ciprian, who participated in the Council of Carthage (411), the city at that time had no Catholic bishops.

== Titular see ==
In 1933, Siccenna was nominally restored as Latin titular bishopric of diocesan rank.

Incumbents were, nearly consecutively, of the fitting Episcopal (lowest) rank, with an archiepiscopal exception:

- Fortunato Zoppas (1964.11.25 – death 1969.08.05) as emeritate; previously Bishop of Nocera de’ Pagani (Italy) (1952.04.26 – 1964.11.25)
- Alois Wagner (later Titular Archbishop, see below) (1969.09.01 – 1992.10.01), as Auxiliary Bishop of Diocese of Linz (Austria) (1969.09.01 – 1981.10.12) and Vice-President of Pontifical Council Cor Unum (1981.10.12 – 1999.07.08)
- Titular Archbishop: Alois Wagner (1992.10.01 – 1999.07.08, retired; died 2002.02.26 ), as Vice-President of Pontifical Council Cor Unum (see above – 1999.07.08) and Permanent Observer (multilateral ambassador) to Food and Agricultural Organization of the United Nations (FAO) (1992 – 1999.07.08)
- Earl Alfred Boyea (2002.07.22 – 2008.02.27), as Auxiliary Bishop of Archdiocese of Detroit (USA) (2002.07.22 – 2008.02.27); later Bishop of Lansing (USA) (2008.02.27 – ...)
- Taras Senkiv, Order of Minims (O.M.) (2008.05.22 – 2014.04.02), first as Auxiliary Bishop of Eparchy of Stryj of the Ukrainians (Ukraine) (2008.05.22 – 2010.01.20), thereafter on the same see as Apostolic Administrator sede plena of Stryj of the Ukrainians (2010.01.20 – 2011.03.24) and Apostolic Administrator of Stryj of the Ukrainians (2011.03.24 – 2014.04.02), later promoted Bishop of Stryj of the Ukrainians (2014.04.02 – ...)
- Joseph Koerber, Spiritans (C.S.Sp.) (born France) (2014.07.11 – ...), as first (see promoted) Apostolic vicar of Makokou ( Gabon) (2014.07.11 – ...); previously only Apostolic Prefect of Makokou (Gabon) (2003.03.07 – 2014.07.11)

== See also ==
- List of Catholic dioceses in Tunisia

== Sources and external links ==
- GCatholic
