= Vasyl Shved =

Ukrainian footballer (born 1971)

Personal information
- Full name: Vasyl Vasylyovych Shved
- Date of birth: 11 December 1971 (age 54)
- Place of birth: Pisochna, Lviv Oblast, Soviet Union (now Ukraine)
- Height: 1.74 m (5 ft 9 in)
- Position: Forward

Youth career
- Mykolaiv

Senior career*
Years	Team	Apps	(Gls)
1993–1995	Hazovyk Komarno	95	(29)
1995–1996	Lublinianka	23	(1)
1996–2000	Hazovyk Komarno	77	(36)
2000–2003	Karpaty Lviv	76	(15)
2000–2003	→ Karpaty-2 Lviv	9	(0)
2001	→ Karpaty-3 Lviv	2	(3)
2004	Hazovyk-Skala Stryi	5	(1)
2004–2005	Tekhno-Tsentr Rohatyn	17	(8)
2005	Nyva Ternopil	2	(0)
2006	Karpaty Kamianka-Buzka (amateurs)	0	(0)
2007–2008	Halychyna Lviv (amateurs)	7	(1)
2009–2013	Karpaty Kamianka-Buzka (amateurs)	38	(10)
2013	Pisochna (amateurs)	0	(0)
- * Club domestic league appearances and goals

Vasyl Vasylyovych Shved (Ukrainian: Василь Васильович Швед; born 11 December 1971) is a former professional footballer who played as a forward.

== Career ==
Shved began his playing career with FC Hazovyk Komarno in the Ukrainian Second League. In 1999–2000 he was a top scorer of the Second League, playing for the Komarno team. He moved to Ukrainian Premier League side FC Karpaty Lviv in July 2000.

== Personal life ==
His oldest son Maryan Shved is also a professional footballer.
