= Olena Havrylko =

Ukrainian artist, educator, public figure (1890–1967)

- Олена Гаврилко
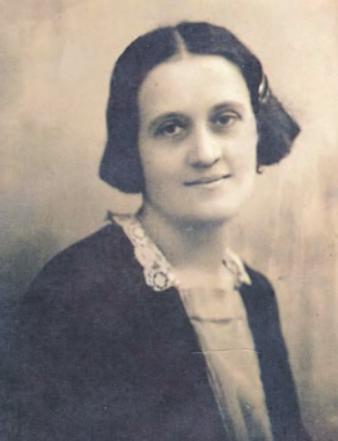
- Born: Olena Porfyrivna Havrylko; 8 February 1890; Shulhanivka, Austria-Hungary (now Ukraine)
- Died: 5 May 1967 (aged 77); Lviv
- Education: Jan Matejko Academy of Fine Arts
- Occupations: Artist, educator, public figure
- Spouse: Mykhailo Havrylko

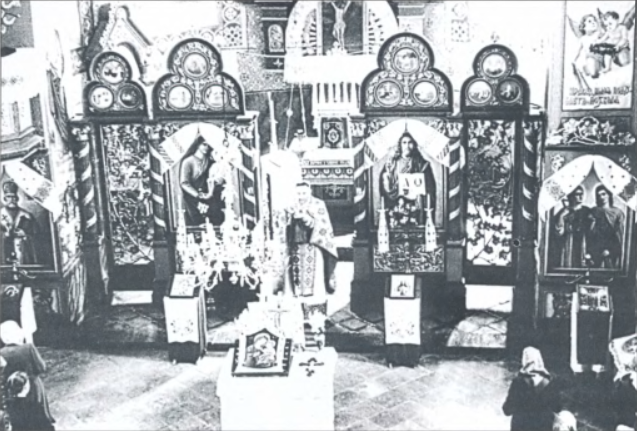
The altar of the Saints Cosmas and Damian church in Shmankivtsi, painted by Olena Havrylko

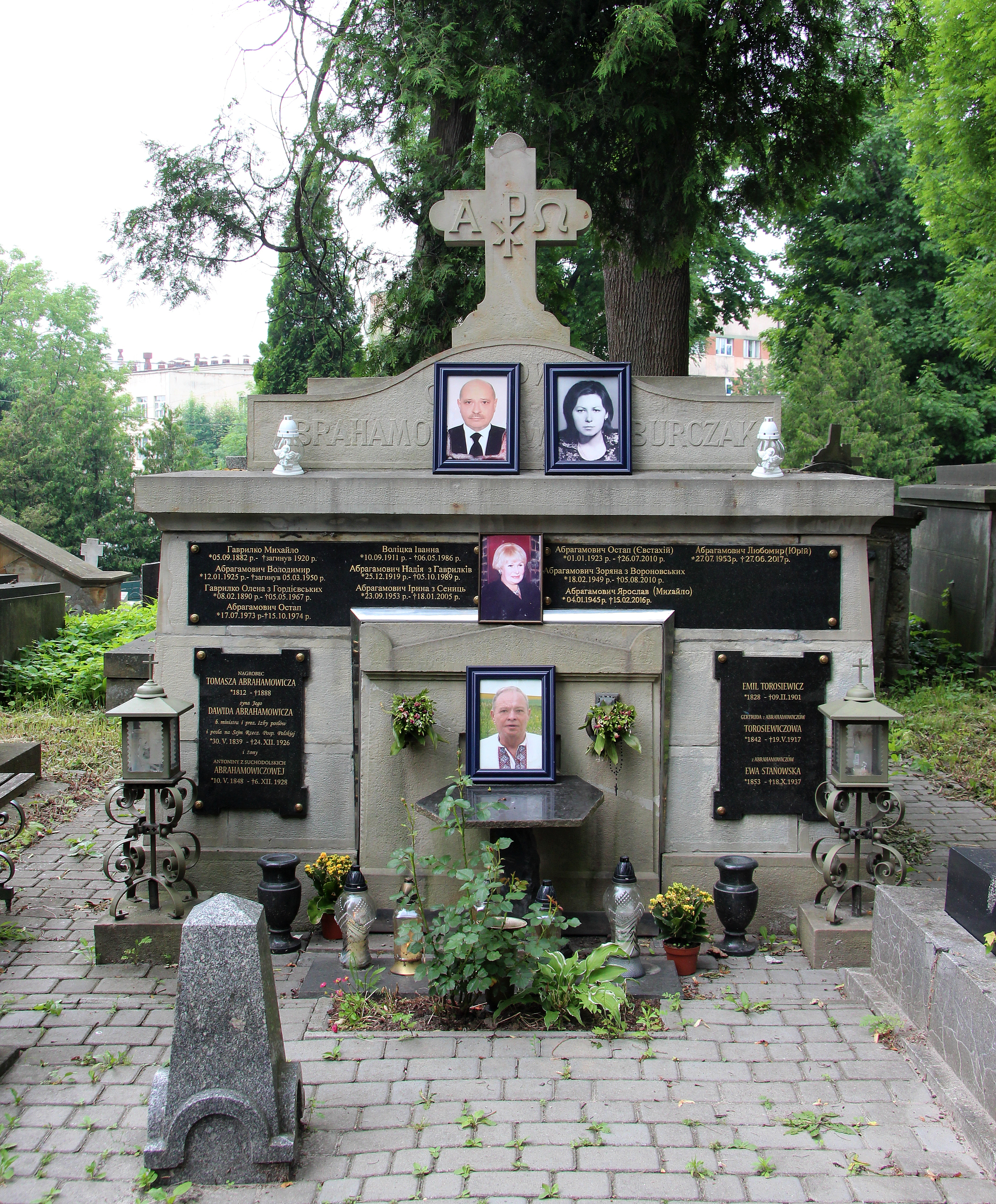
The tomb at Lychakiv Cemetery, where she is buried with her relatives

Olena Havrylko (Ukrainian: Олена Порфирівна Гаврилко; née Hordiievska; 8 February 1890 – 5 May 1967) was a Ukrainian artist, educator, public figure.

== Biography ==
Olena Havrylko was born on 8 February 1890 in Shulhanivka, now the Nahirianka rural hromada of the Chortkiv Raion, Ternopil Oblast, to a Ukrainian family of priest Porfyrii Hordiievskyi, whose family descended from the Cossack colonel Hordiienko, who settled in Galicia after the destruction of the Sich. The surname was later changed to the Galician form Hordiievskyi. The mothers of Olena Hordiievska, Bohdan Lepkyi, and Solomiya Krushelnytska were sisters.

In 1911, an artist stayed for some time in Shmankivtsi, near Chortkiv, and painted three images of Vira, Nadiia, and Liubov. A few months later, when he returned, he saw three oil paintings in the living room of Porfyrii Hordiievskyi. The priest said that these copies were made by his daughter Olena. The artist was extremely surprised and said that the girl needed to learn painting, but Mykhailyna's mother was categorically against it. She was barely persuaded by Porfyrii's brother, Ivan Hordiievskyi, then a mitre of Stanyslavivskyi.

Havrylko studied at the Benedictine School in Lviv. She graduated from the Jan Matejko Academy of Fine Arts.

In 1924, she passed the exam for a teacher of manual labor at the Teachers' Seminary in Ternopil, and in 1928, at the Jan Matejko Academy of Fine Arts, she passed the exam in drawing as a subject.

In 1922–1930, she was a teacher of drawings at the Ternopil Ukrainian Gymnasium and both drawings and manual labor at the Ternopil "Ridna Shkola" gymnasium, and in 1930–1939, in addition to the above subjects, she also taught singing there.

In 1939, fleeing with her family from the Red Army, she ended up in Kraków. Metropolitan Andrei Sheptytskyi helped her to prepare documents for departure to the United States, but she returned to Lviv.

In 1940, she moved to Lviv and worked as an artist-teacher at a pedagogical school and an art school. She also taught during the German occupation. After the war, she worked as an art teacher at a medical school until her retirement.

Havrylko died on 5 May 1967 in Lviv. She was buried in the family grave at Lychakiv Cemetery.

=== Public activity ===
She took an active part in the Sodality of Our Lady, the Besida society, and the education of young girls at various courses organized by the Ridna Shkola events, as well as in public cultural life.

Before the first arrival of the Bolsheviks in western Ukraine, orphanages were run by the organization. She took Ivanka Volitska and Mariia Petryshyn (b. 1912) from the orphanage for upbringing.

== Works ==
Havrylko painted landscapes, still lifes, and portraits. In the postwar period, she embroidered pillows, towels, curtains, shirts, blouses, napkins, and clothes for priests.

Havrylko also painted Ukrainian churches. In Ternopil, in the Redemptorist Church, an iconostasis made by her has been preserve.

Her grandson, Liubomyr Abrahamovych, has an unfinished image of the "Gypsy Mother of God".

== Family ==
In 1912, Mykhailo Havrylko sculpted a bust of Olena Hordiievska, whom he married on 23 September 1917; were married in the Church of the Dormition in Pisochna, Stryi Raion. They raised two daughters, Liubov-Svitlana (b. 1918) and Nadiia-Oksana (b. 1919).

== Sources ==
- Кунько І. Олена Гаврилко // Ювілейна книга Української гімназії в Тернополі 1898–1998: До сторіччя заснування / За ред. С. Яреми. — Тернопіль; Львів, 1998. — p. 437.
- Коваль, Роман (2012). Михайло Гаврилко: і стеком, і шаблею. Вінниця: ДП "Державна картографічна фабрика". p. 472. ISBN 978-617-533-010-4.
- Перелік імен та подій, що не увійшли до основного списку // Література до знаменних і пам'ятних дат Тернопільщини на 2010 рік : бібліогр. покажч. Вип. 20 / Голов. упр. з питань туризму, сім'ї, молоді та спорту Терноп. облдержадмін., Упр. культури Терноп. облдержадмін., Терноп. обл. універс. наук. б-ка; уклад. М. Друневич; ред. О. Раскіна; відп. за випуск В. Вітенко. — Тернопіль : Підручники і посібники, 2009. — p. 9.
