= Mykhailo Khudash =

Ukrainian linguist (1925–2011)

- Михайло Лукич Худаш
- Born: 20 December 1925; Demnia, now Lviv Oblast, Ukraine
- Died: 11 May 2011 (aged 85); Lviv
- Education: Lviv Pedagogical Institute
- Occupation: Linguist

Mykhailo Khudash (Ukrainian: Михайло Лукич Худаш; 20 December 1925, Demnia, now Lviv Oblast – 11 May 2011, Lviv) was a Ukrainian linguist. In 1980, he became a Doctor of Philology.

== Biography ==
In 1950, he graduated from the Lviv Pedagogical Institute. He subsequently worked as a teacher. From 1957 to 1980, he worked at the Institute of Social Sciences of the Academy of Sciences of the Ukrainian SSR in Lviv: from 1963 as a senior research fellow, and from 1980 to 2010 at the Institute of Ethnology of the National Academy of Sciences of Ukraine: from 1976 as a leading research fellow.

== Scholarly activity ==
A scholarly of Ukrainian historical and linguistic monuments dating back to the 16th and 17th centuries. He paid particular attention to the acts of the Lviv Dormition Brotherhood.

Khudash made a significant contribution to the study of business language vocabulary, as evidenced by his monograph "Leksyka ukraiinskykh dilovykh dokumentiv kintsia XVI — pochatku XVII st. (na materialakh Lvivskoho Stavropihiiskoho bratstva)" (1961). However, the central focus of his research was anthroponymy (the system of proper names), especially in the context of the 16th century. These developments formed the basis for his major work "Z istorii ukraiinskoi antroponimii" (1977), in which he described in detail the Ukrainian system of naming in general. In addition, the scholar studied the language of the prominent figure Pamvo Berynda, as well as ancient Ukrainian ethnonymy, as evidenced by his 1981 work devoted to the Dregovichs and Ulichs.

== Works ==
Monographs:

- Leksyka ukraiinskykh dilovykh dokumentiv kintsia XVI — pochatku XVII st. (na materialakh Lvivskoho Stavropihiiskoho bratstva) (1961)
- Z istorii ukraiinskoi antroponimii (1977)
- Slovnyk staroukrainskoi movy XIV—XV st.: u 2 t. (1977–1978, co-author)
- Pokhodzhennia ukraiinskykh Karpatskykh i Prykarpatskykh nazv naselenykh punktiv (vidantroponimichni utvorennia) (1991, co-author)
- Ukraiinski Karpatski i Prykarpatski nazvy naselenykh punktiv (utvorennia vid slovianskykh avtokhtonnykh vidkompozitnykh skorochenykh osobovykh vlasnykh imen) (1995)
- Ukraiinski Karpatski i Prykarpatski nazvy naselenykh punktiv (utvorennia vid vidapeliatyvnykh antroponimiv) (2004)
- Ukraiinski Karpatski i Prykarpatski nazvy naselenykh punktiv (vidapeliatyvni utvorennia) (2006)

== Bibliography ==
- Добірка студій професора Михайла Худаша: історична ономастика, мовні портрети, спогади / За науковою редакцією І. Д. Фаріон. - Львів : Видавництво Львівської політехніки, 2019. - 440 с. - ISBN 978-966-941-336-9.
- Бурячок А. А. Худаш Михайло Лукич // Українська мова : енциклопедія / НАН України, Інститут мовознавства ім. О. О. Потебні, Інститут української мови ; ред. В. М. Русанівський [та ін.]. — К. : Українська енциклопедія, 2000. — ISBN 966-7492-07-9. — С. 717.
- Михайло Худаш: Бібліогр. покажч. Л., 2005.
