= Trostianets rural hromada =

Hromada in Lviv Oblast, Ukraine

Trostianets rural hromada Тростянецька сільська громада
- Hromada
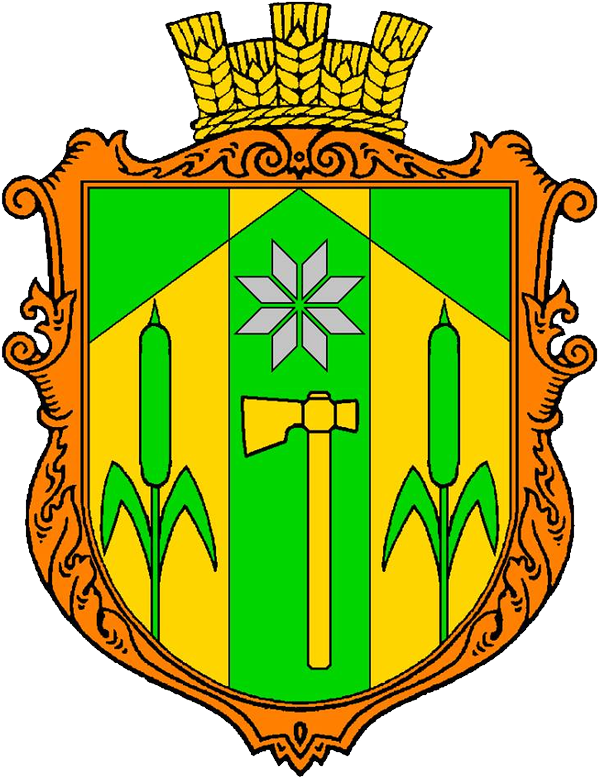
- Seal
- Interactive map of Trostianets rural hromada
- Country: Ukraine
- Oblast: Lviv Oblast
- Raion: Stryi Raion
- Admin. center: Trostianets

Area
  - Total: 1,876 km^{2} (724 sq mi)

Population (2021)
  - Total: 7,991
  - Density: 4.260/km^{2} (11.03/sq mi)
- CATOTTG code: UA46100250000088835
- Settlements: 17
- Rural settlements: 1
- Villages: 16
- Website: rada-trostyanets.gov.ua

Trostianets rural hromada (Ukrainian: Тростянецька сільська громада) is a hromada in Ukraine, in Stryi Raion of Lviv Oblast. The administrative center is the village of Trostianets.

== Settlements ==
The hromada consists of 1 rural settlement (Lypivka) and 16 villages:

- Brodky
- Velyka Volia
- Hlukhivets
- Demnia
- Dobriany
- Dubrova
- Zaklad
- Iliv
- Krasiv
- Lubiana
- Mala Volia
- Poliana
- Stilsko
- Sukha Dolyna
- Ternopillia
- Trostianets
