= Ukrainian Catholic Eparchy of Stryi =

Ukrainian Greek Catholic eparchy in Ukraine

Coordinates: 49.2500°N 23.8500°E

Eparchy of Stryi Eparchia Striensis Ucrainorum Українська Греко-Католицька Стрийська Єпархія
- Coat of arms of Stryi

Location
- Territory: 5 Raions of Lviv Oblast
- Ecclesiastical province: Archeparchy of Lviv
- Headquarters: Stryi, Lviv Oblast, Ukraine

Statistics
- Area: 4,145 km^{2} (1,600 sq mi)
- Population: Total; Catholics: (as of 2014); 397,217; 305,041 (76.8%)
- Parishes: 358

Information
- Sui iuris church: Ukrainian Greek Catholic Church
- Rite: Byzantine
- Established: July 21, 2000
- Cathedral: Ukrainian Catholic Cathedral of Holy Dormition of the Mother of God
- Patron saint: St. James Apostol
- Secular priests: 251

Current leadership
- Pope: Leo XIV
- Major Archbishop: Major Archbishop Sviatoslav Shevchuk
- Bishop: Taras Senkiv
- Metropolitan Archbishop: Ihor Vozniak Metropolitan of the Ukrainian Catholic Archeparchy of Lviv
- Auxiliary Bishops: Bohdan Manyshyn

Map

Website
- Ukrainian Catholic Eparchy of Stryi

The Eparchy of Stryi is an eparchy of the Ukrainian Greek Catholic Church. It is a suffragan see of the Archeparchy of Lviv. The first Eparch was Bishop Julian Gbur, who was appointed to this position by Pope John Paul II on 21 July 2000. He died on 24 March 2011. The incumbent eparch is Taras Senkiv. The Cathedral church of the diocese is the "Cathedral of Dormition of the Mother of God" in the city of Stryi.

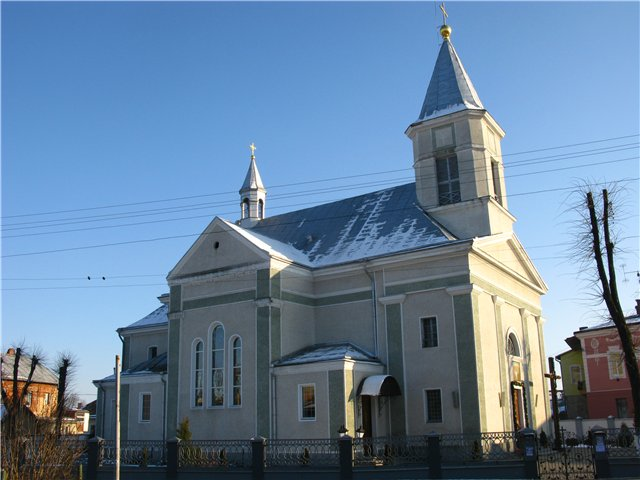
Seat of the Eparchy: The Cathedral of Dormition of the Mother of God

On Wednesday, 20 January 2010, Pope Benedict XVI gave his assent to the declaration of impediment of the eparchial see of Stryi of the Ukrainians, Ukraine, canonically issued by the Synod of Bishops of the Greek-Catholic Ukrainian Church, because of the state of health of Julian Gbur, S.V.D., in accordance with Canon 233, Paragraph 1 of the Code of Canon Law for the Eastern Churches. He accepted the proposal of the Synod of Bishops of the Greek-Catholic Ukrainian Church to appoint Auxiliary Bishop Senkiv as Apostolic Administrator "ad nutum Sanctae Sedis" of the Eparchy of Stryi.

== History ==
- July 21, 2000: Established as Eparchy of Stryi from the Ukrainian Catholic Archeparchy of Lviv.

== Eparchial and auxiliary bishops ==
The following is a list of the bishops of Stryi and their terms of service:

- (21 Jul 2000 – 24 Mar 2011) Julian Gbur, S.V.D.

(22 May 2008 – 20 Jan 2010) Taras Senkiv O.M., titular bishop of Siccenna, auxiliary
(20 Jan 2010 – 02 Apr 2014) Taras Senkiv O.M., titular bishop of Siccenna, Apostolic Administrator

- (since 02 Apr 2014 – ) Taras Senkiv O.M.

(since 02 Apr 2014 – ) Bohdan Manyshyn, titular bishop of Lesvi, auxiliary
