= Rozvadiv =

Village in Lviv Oblast, Ukraine

Rozvadiv Розвадів
- Village
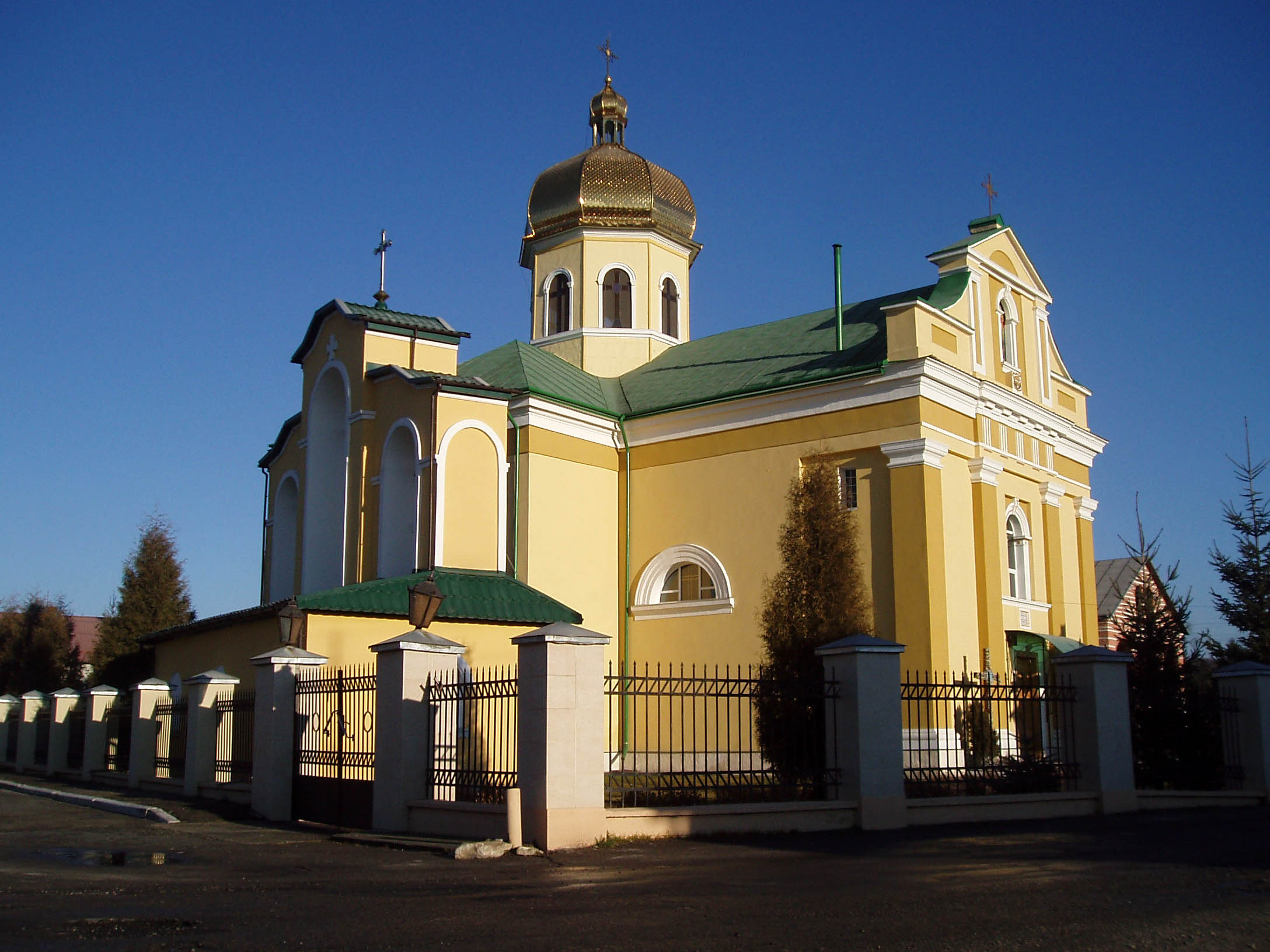
- The Church of the Resurrection in Rozvadiv

- Flag Coat of arms

- Location of Rozvadiv in Lviv Oblast Location of Rozvadiv in Ukraine
- Coordinates: 49°30′11″N 23°58′01″E
- Country: Ukraine
- Oblast: Lviv Oblast
- Raion: Stryi Raion
- Hromada: Rozvadiv rural hromada
- First mentioned: 1467

Population
  - Total: 5,310

Rozvadiv (Ukrainian: Розвадів; Polish: Rozwadów) is a village in Stryi Raion, Lviv Oblast, in western Ukraine. It is the capital of Rozvadiv rural hromada, one of the hromadas of Ukraine. Its population is 3,1 thousand (as of 2025).

== History ==
Rozvadiv was first mentioned in 1467. Soon after its establishment, the village was destroyed by the armies of Meñli I Giray, although it was quickly rebuilt. Rozvadiv was again destroyed in the autumn of 1855, this time by a fire.

Since 2019, Rozvadiv has been home to Rozvadiv Building Materials TOV, a limestone and sand mining company under the Kovalska Industrial-Construction Group.

A gas leak occurred at a drilling rig in Rozvadiv on 26 April 2023. As a result, 29 individuals were required to evacuate from their homes, and the supply of gas to the village was temporarily stopped.

== Notable people ==
- Denys Korenets, educator, geographer, and historian.
- Antoni Opolski, Polish physicist.
- Valerii Panasiuk, educator and cultural historian.
- Yaroslav Skakun, sculptor.
- Ivan Skolozdra, glass painter.
- Mykhailo Skolozdra, engineer, machinist, and Hero of Socialist Labour.
- Bohdan Zdebskyi, soldier of the Armed Forces of Ukraine killed during the War in Donbas.
