= Rozvadiv rural hromada =

Hromada in Lviv Oblast, Ukraine

Rozvadiv rural hromada Розвадівська сільська громада
- Hromada
- Seal
- Interactive map of Rozvadiv rural hromada
- Country: Ukraine
- Oblast: Lviv Oblast
- Raion: Stryi Raion
- Administrative center: Rozvadiv

Area
  - Total: 1,071 km^{2} (414 sq mi)

Population (2021)
  - Total: 12,052
  - Density: 11.25/km^{2} (29.15/sq mi)
- CATOTTG code: UA46100170000077437
- Settlements: 9
- Villages: 9
- Website: rozvadivotg.gov.ua

Rozvadiv rural hromada (Ukrainian: Розвадівська сільська громада) is a hromada in Ukraine, in Stryi Raion of Lviv Oblast. The administrative center is the village of Rozvadiv.

== Settlements ==
The hromada consists of 9 villages:

- Veryn
- Krupske
- Naditychi
- Pisochna
- Rozvadiv
- Chernytsia
- Derzhiv
- Kyivets
- Ostriv
