= Julian Gbur =

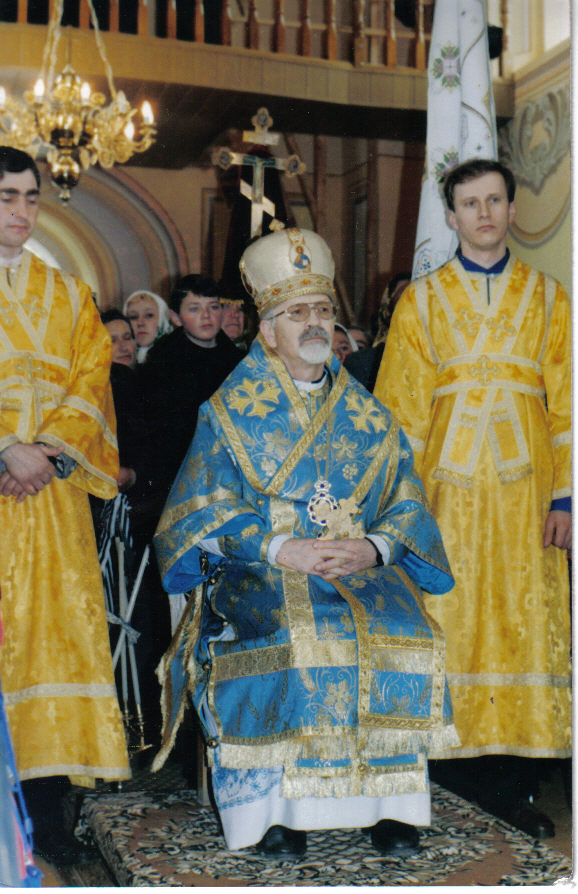

Personal details
- Born: November 14, 1942
- Died: March 24, 2011 (aged 68)
- Denomination: Roman Catholic
- Coat of arms

Julian Gbur (November 14, 1942 – March 24, 2011) was the bishop of the Ukrainian Catholic Eparchy of Stryi, Ukraine.

Born in Brzeżawa, Poland, Gbur was ordained to the priesthood in 1970. He was named auxiliary bishop in 1994 and in 2000 was appointed bishop of the Stryi Eparchy.
