= Ternopil National Medical University =

Public medical university in Ukraine

Coordinates: 49.551667°N 25.590556°E

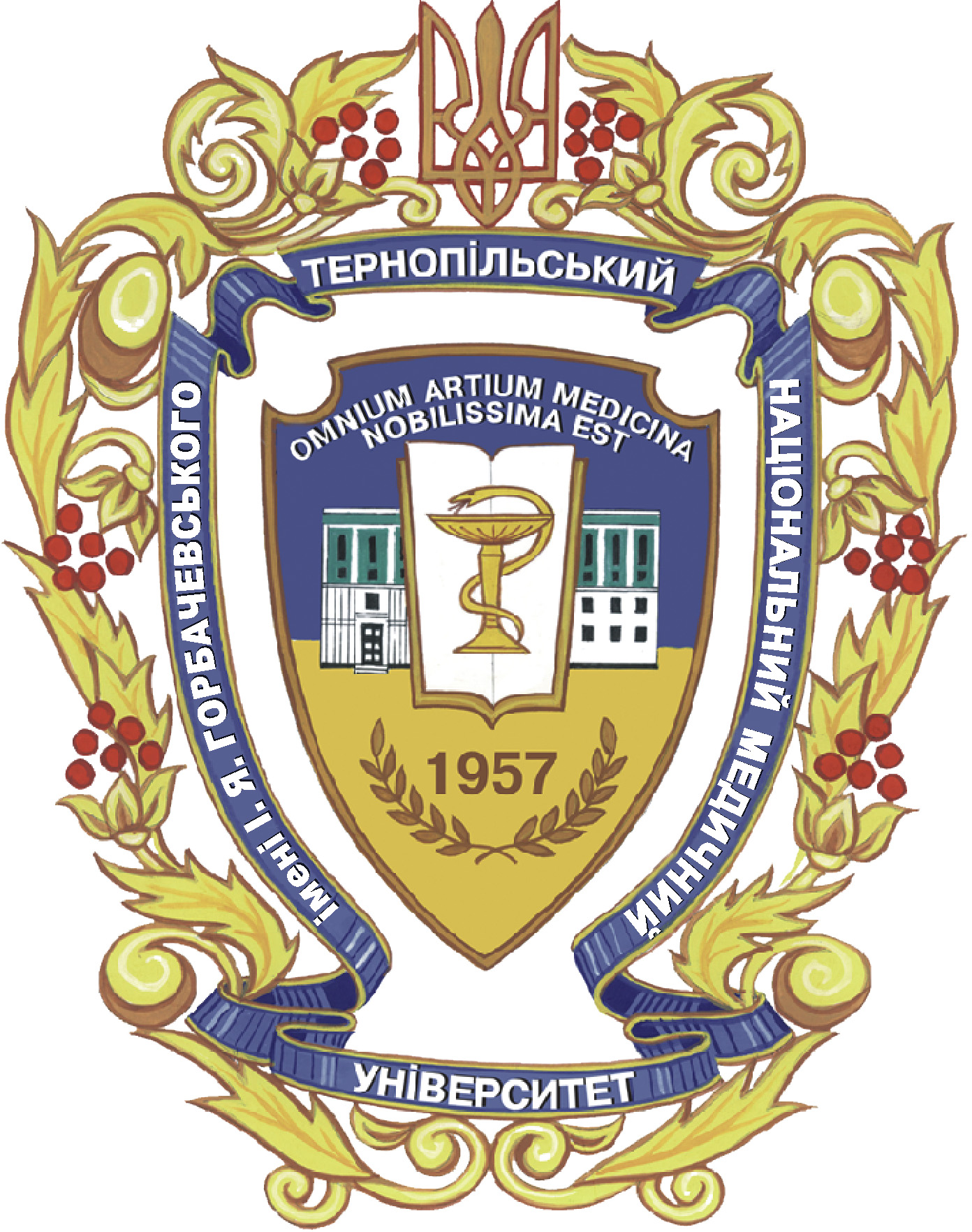
- Type: Public medical university
- Established: 1957; 68 years ago
- Accreditation: Ministry of Education and Science of Ukraine
- Rector: Dr. M. Korda
- Location: Ternopil, Ukraine
- Campus: Urban
- Affiliations: Ministry of Health of Ukraine
- Website: www.tdmu.edu.ua/en/
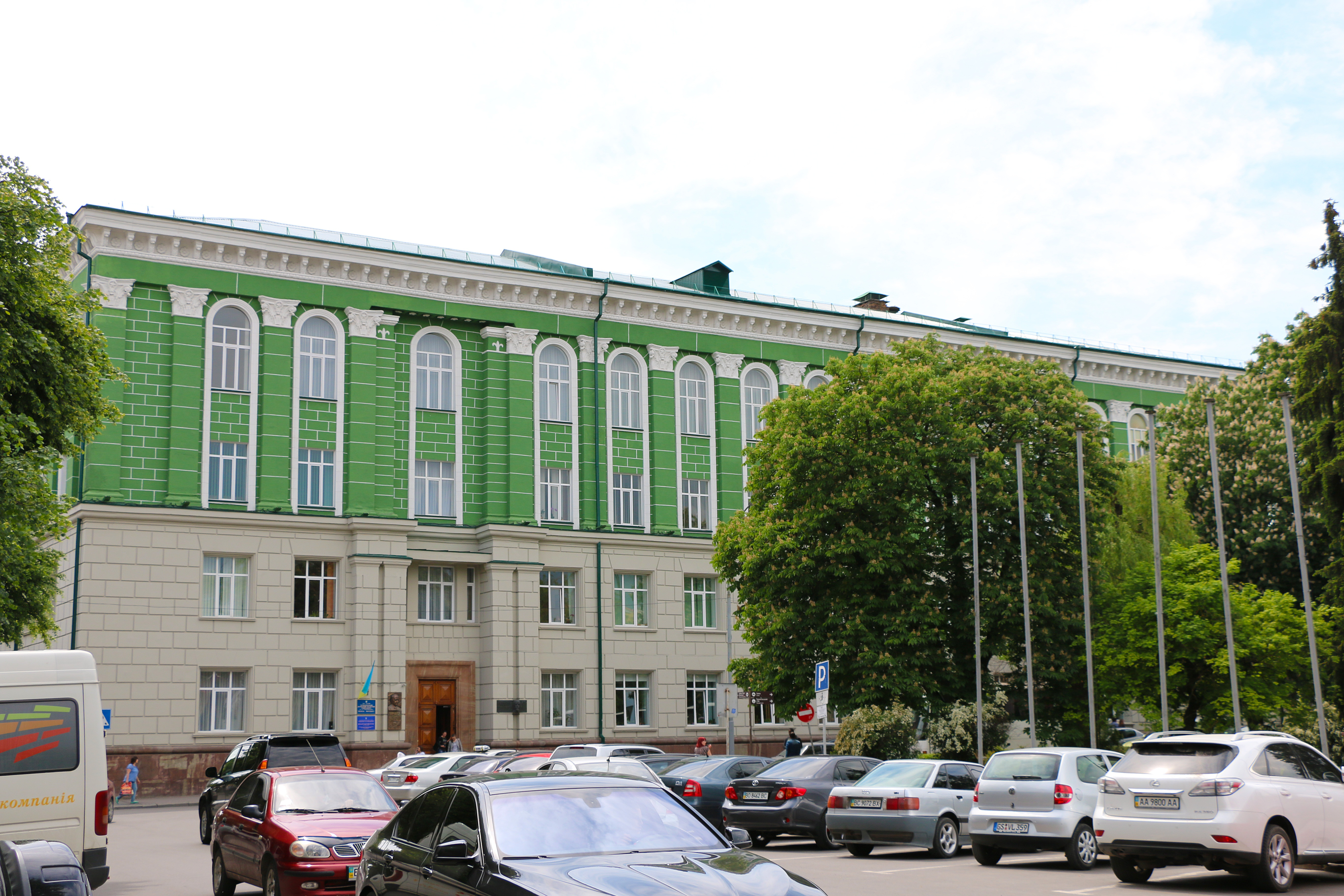

The Ivan Horbachevsky Ternopil National Medical University, or simply Ternopil National Medical University (Ukrainian: Тернопільський національний медичний університет імені І.Я.Горбачевського), is a state-sponsored university run by the Ministry of Health as medical training institute located in the city of Ternopil in Ukraine.

== History ==
TNMU was founded on April 12, 1957, as a Ternopil Medical Institute. On July 1, 1992, the institute was named after Ivan Horbachevsky. On December 30, 1997, it received the status of State Medical Academy, and on 17 November 2004, after reorganization, the institution became Ivan Horbachevsky Ternopil State Medical University. The first rector of the medical institute was Petro Ohij, and the vice-rector Arsen Martyniuk. The regional administration transferred two buildings to the institute for academic and laboratory facilities and two dormitories. University clinic facilities were located in the municipal hospital. At the same time, the Morphology Building, a dormitory, and the Regional Hospital was being built.

The institute was composed of 19 departments and had a total of 66 instructors, among them notable individuals such as Kostiantyn Kovanov, Rostyslav-Yurii Komarovskyi, Anatolii Lokai, Ivan Sytnyk, Mykola Skakun, and Yevhen Honcharuk. The inaugural class of the institute consisted of 210 students.

The institute steadily developed programs and facilities, but the biggest change took place after Ukraine gained its independence in 1991 when it started moving towards the European education system. In 1994, the Institute received IV level of institutional accreditation. In 1995 TSMU added the specialty of Nursing, and in 2000, Pharmacy.

As of 2016, the university offers Bachelor's level programs in Physical Therapy and Nursing; Master's level programs in Medicine, Pharmacy, Dentistry, Nursing, Physical Therapy, and Public Health; and Doctorate level programs in Medicine, Pediatrics, Pharmacy, Dentistry, and Biology.

According to the Decree of the President of Ukraine No. 146/2019 from April 17, 2019, I. Horbachevsky Ternopil State Medical University received the status of a national university. The document states that “taking into account national and international recognition of the results of the activity of the State Higher Educational Institution ” I.Ya.Horbachevsky Ternopil State Medical University of the Ukrainian Ministry of Public Health”, its significant contribution to the development of national medical and pharmaceutical education and science, I resolve to give the State Higher Educational Institution “I.Ya.Horbachevsky Ternopil State Medical University of the Ukrainian Ministry of Public Health” the status of national and to continue naming it – ”I.Ya.Horbachevsky Ternopil National Medical University of the Ukrainian Ministry of Public Health”.

== Rankings and reputation ==
In 2021, Ternopil National University is holding country Rank 15th and World Rank of 3368 according to QS Ranking system. The University currently achieved the 4th level Of Accreditation.

== Academics ==
=== Teaching staff ===
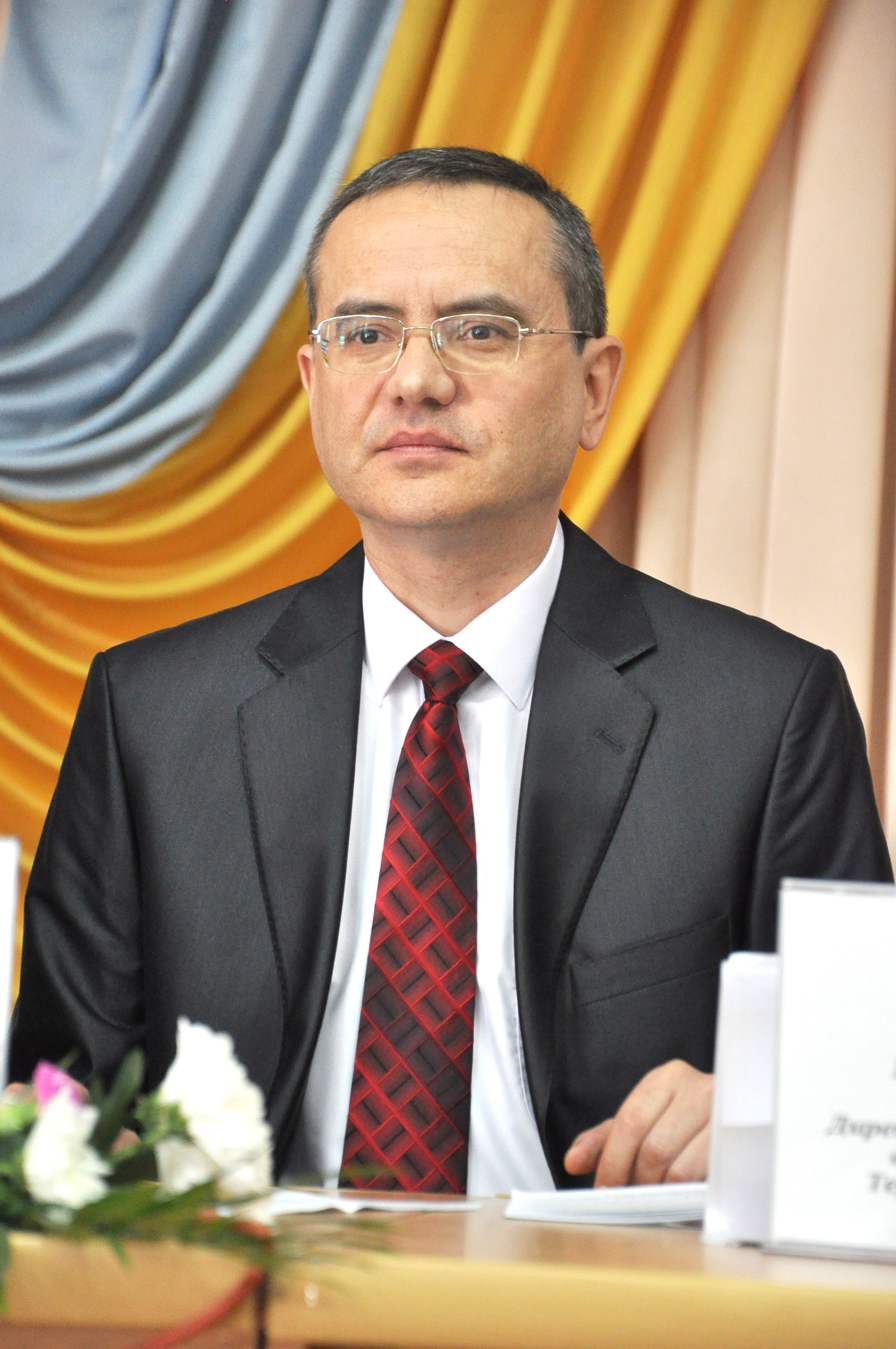
Rector Mykhailo Korda

The teaching staff includes over 600 professors, 102 Doctors of Science and full professors, and 460 associate professors. In addition, the staff includes two Corresponding and one Full Member of the National Academy of Medical Sciences, 11 Merited Scientists of Ukraine, 3 Merited Inventors of Ukraine, 2 Merited Teachers of Ukraine, and 4 Merited Doctors of Ukraine.

=== Student body and teaching process ===
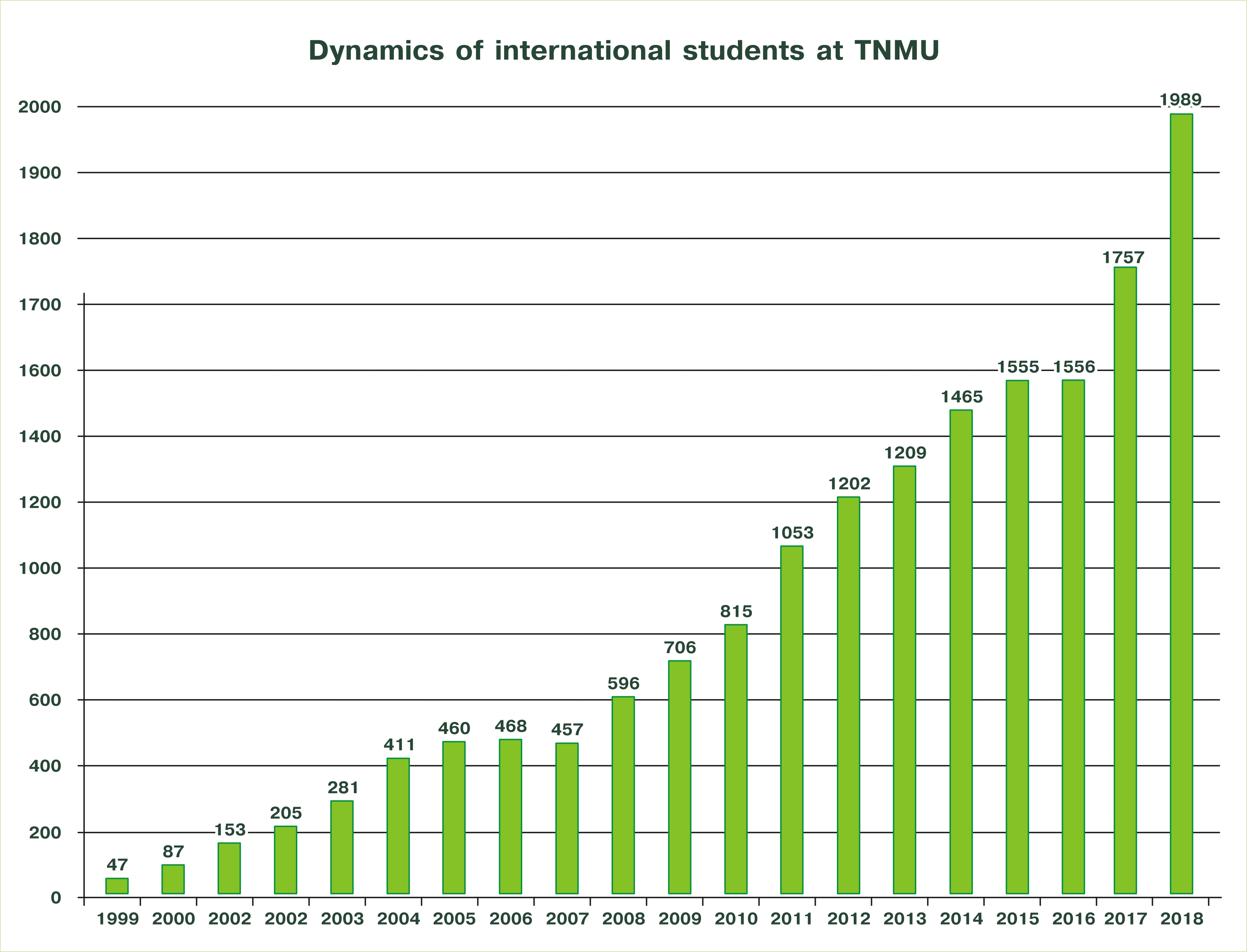
Dynamics of international students at Ternopil National Medical University, 1999-2018

Over 6530 students are currently enrolled in Ternopil State Medical University, including more than 1977 international students from 53 countries. As of 2016, over 700 students from African countries (48% of the total number of international students, including 351 from Nigeria). Students from Asia constitute 21% and Europe 15% of the international students. The language of instruction for the majority (90%) of international students is in English.

Lectures typically take place in one of the 10 large lecture halls equipped with modern audio-visual systems. Practical and laboratory classes usually consist of 8-12 persons. Clinical training takes place in affiliated hospitals. Since 2006 students in their first years learn clinical aspects together with theoretical subjects. Academic departments are located in different buildings around the central Ternopil, while clinical departments are located in affiliated hospitals.

Classes usually take place from 0900 to 1500 with instruction language in Ukrainian, English, and Russian.

=== Qualifications ===
Ternopil State Medical University is listed in the FAIMER (International Medical Education) directory under ECFMG and the WHO (World Health Organization) directory of Medical Universities/Schools. In addition, TSMU's degree is recognized by WHO, US Education Department, General Medical Council of England, and in EU countries.

Since 2005 students are assessed according to the European Credit Test System (ECTS) credit-module system, which will allow the diplomas granted by the University to be converted in all countries of the European Union.

=== Faculties ===
The university contains the following faculties: Medicine (6 years – MD program), Dentistry (5 years), Pharmacy (5 years), and Nursing (2–4 years). Postgraduate programs are also offered in different fields.

The theoretical departments of the faculty occupy four educational, scientific institutes, which are independent structural-functional subdivisions of the University: Institute of Morphology, Institute of Biomedical Problems, Institute of Modeling and Pathologic Processes Analyzing, and M. Skakun Institute of Pharmacology, Hygiene and Medical Biochemistry. In addition, there are 12 clinical departments based in the city and regional medical establishments in Ternopil.

=== Postgraduate education ===
Postgraduates can study for a Master's Degree or a Doctorate.

Other continuing education includes a Training Internship Program and provision for clinical specialization.

== Vacation activities ==
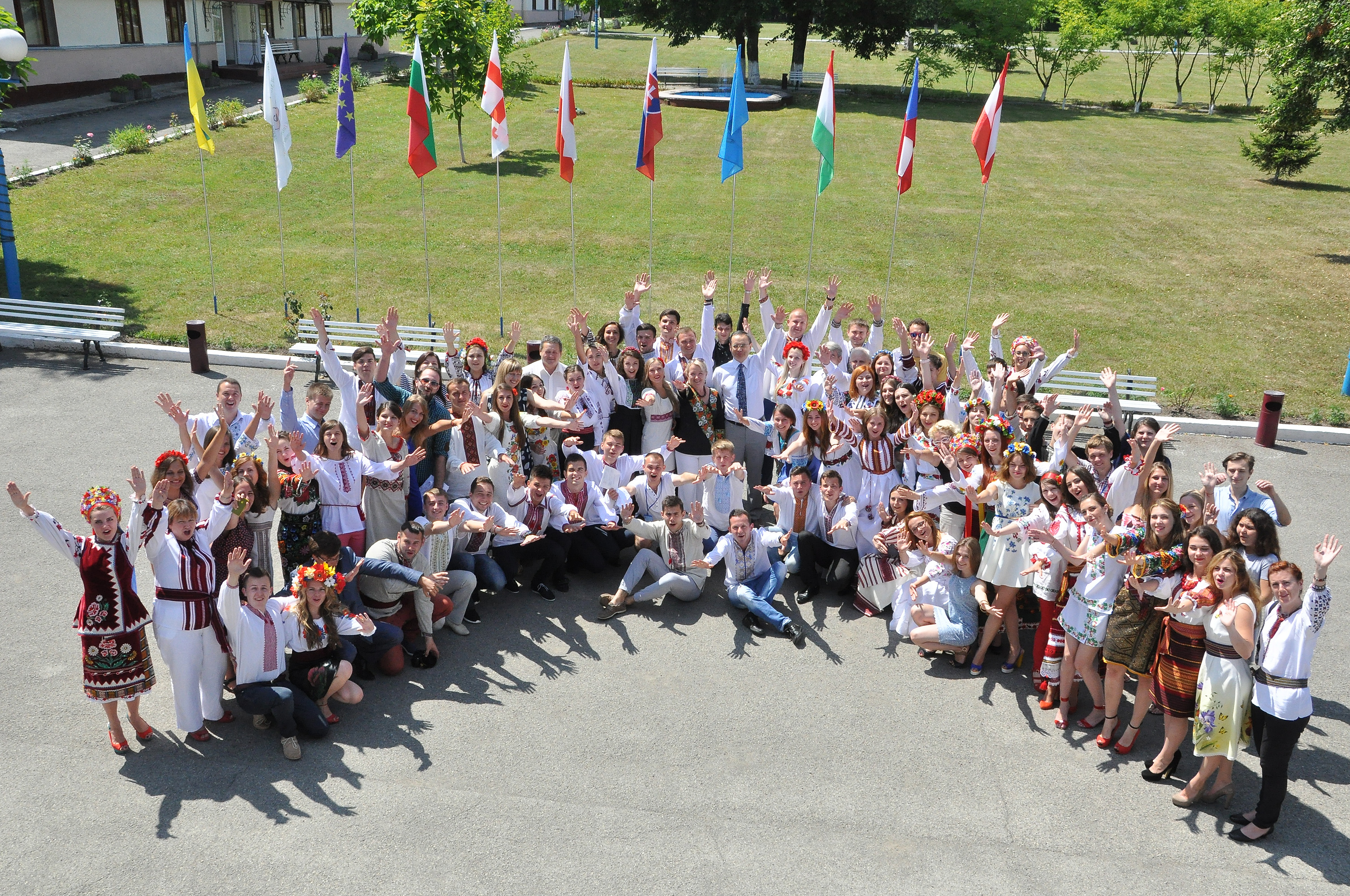
International summer schools

International summer schools have involved students from the University of South Carolina, Moscow State University, Kazakh Medical Academy, Shlyonsk Medical Academy (Poland), National Pharmaceutical University (Kharkiv). The university also offers students a chance to travel abroad for student exchange programs during the summer.

== Foreign students ==
More than 1900 international students from 53 different countries are studying in Ternopil National Medical University.

The University collaborates with several foreign institutions.

Ternopil National Medical University is the first university in Ukraine to adopt the American Nursing Program. In the American Nursing School and International Nursing School, teaching follows the American Nursing School curriculum. TSMU collaborates with the University of South Carolina Upstate (USA) to exchange academic programs for nursing students. The Nursing School offers two degrees:

- Associate Degree in Nursing (ADN) – two-year program
- Bachelor of Science in Nursing (BSN) – four-year program (or two years for those who already have a nursing degree)

After graduation, students are eligible to take the National Council License Examination (NCLEX) and Commission on Graduates of Foreign Nursing Schools (CGFNS) for registered nurses to start working and living in the USA. After obtaining an associate degree, students can transfer to the USA for a bachelor's degree.

== See also ==
- List of universities in Ukraine
- List of medical universities in Ukraine
