= Trostianets, Stryi Raion, Lviv Oblast =

Village in Lviv Oblast, Ukraine

Trostianets Солонка
- Village
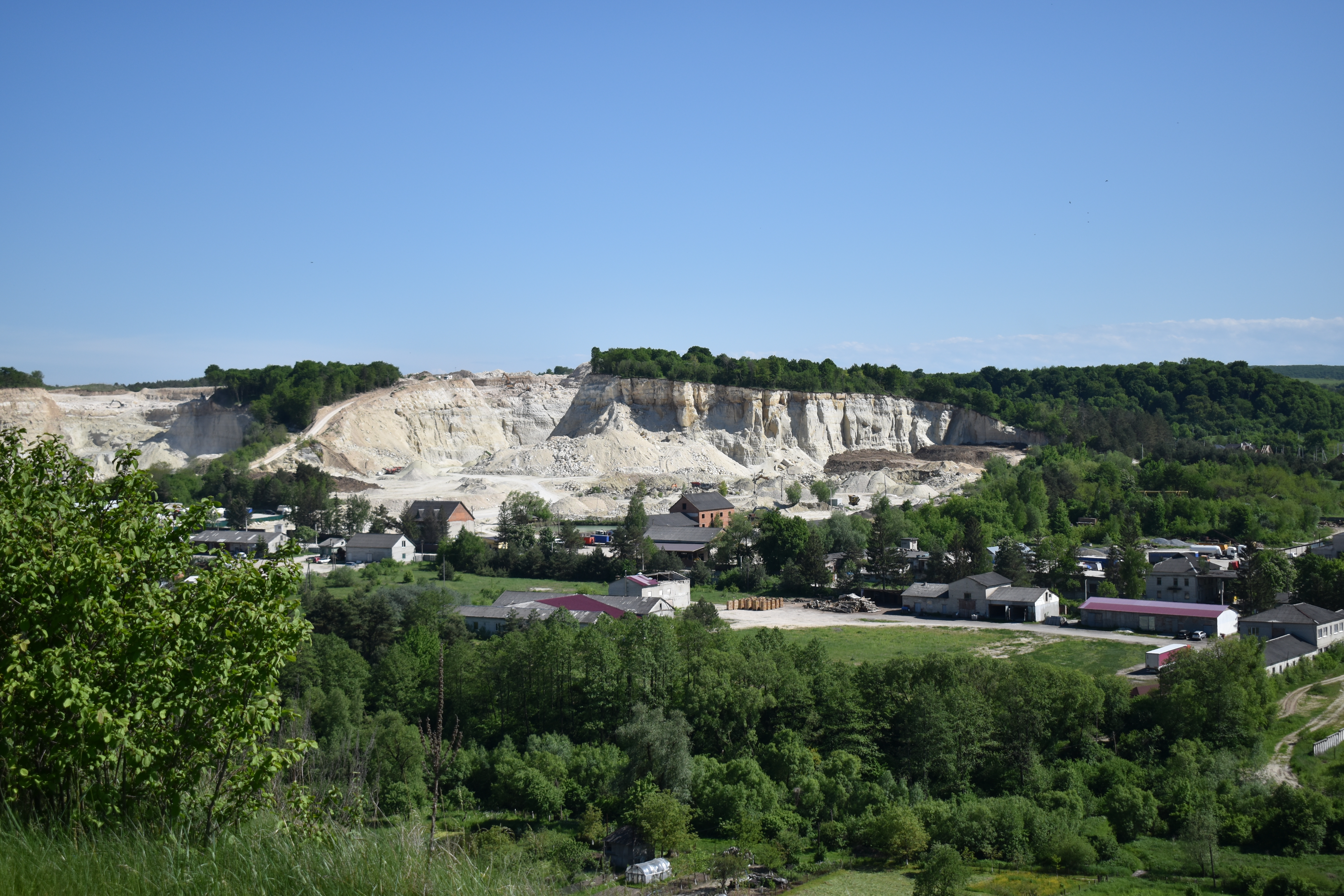

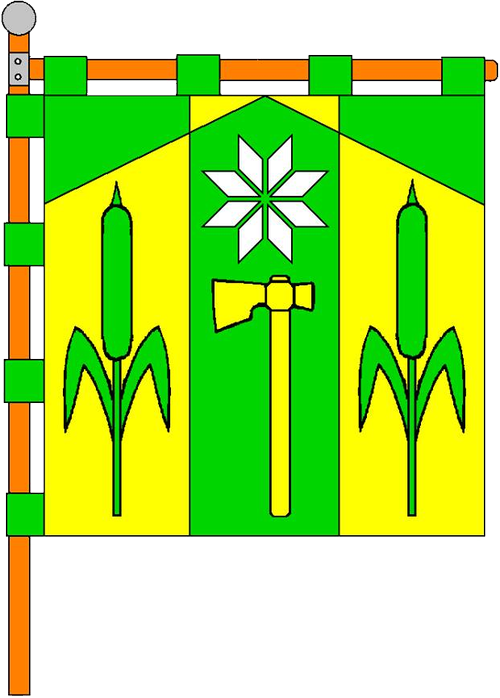
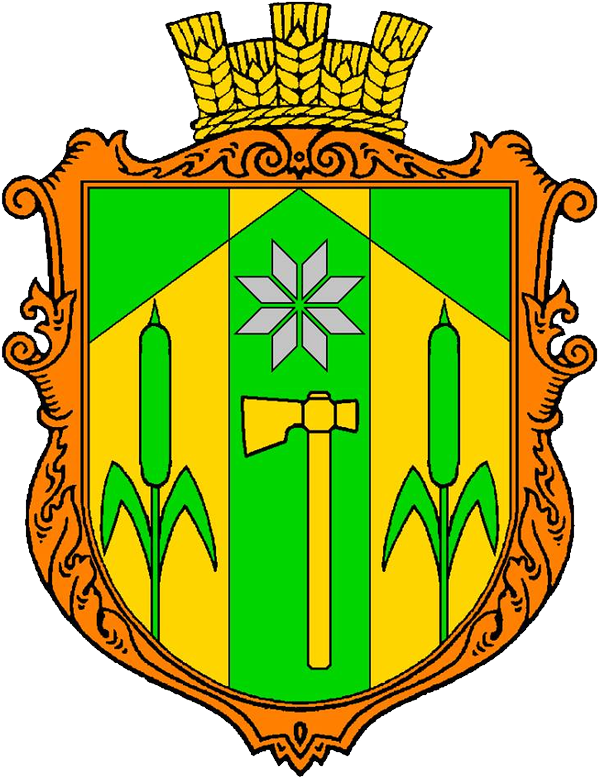
- Flag Coat of arms

- Location of Trostianets in Lviv Oblast Location of Trostianets in Ukraine
- Coordinates: 49°33′03″N 24°00′28″E
- Country: Ukraine
- Oblast: Lviv Oblast
- Raion: Stryi Raion
- Hromada: Trostianets rural hromada

Population (2001)
  - Total: 547

Trostianets (Ukrainian: Тростянець; Polish: Trościaniec) is a village in Stryi Raion, Lviv Oblast, in western Ukraine. It is the administrative centre of Trostianets rural hromada, one of the hromadas of Ukraine.

Trostianets is home to the Tortonian sandstone outcrops, a natural landmark of Ukraine. The outcrops are home to several fossils from the Tortonian age, lending the landmark its name.

According to the 2001 Ukrainian census, the village had a population of 547. Of this population, all but one citizen spoke Ukrainian natively. The remaining citizen spoke Armenian.
