= Mykolaiv Raion, Lviv Oblast =

Former subdivision of Lviv Oblast, Ukraine

Mykolaiv Raion Миколаївський район
- Raion
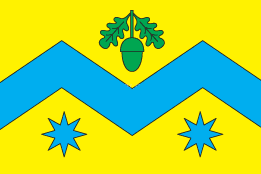
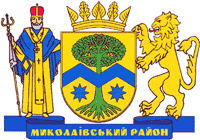
- Flag Coat of arms

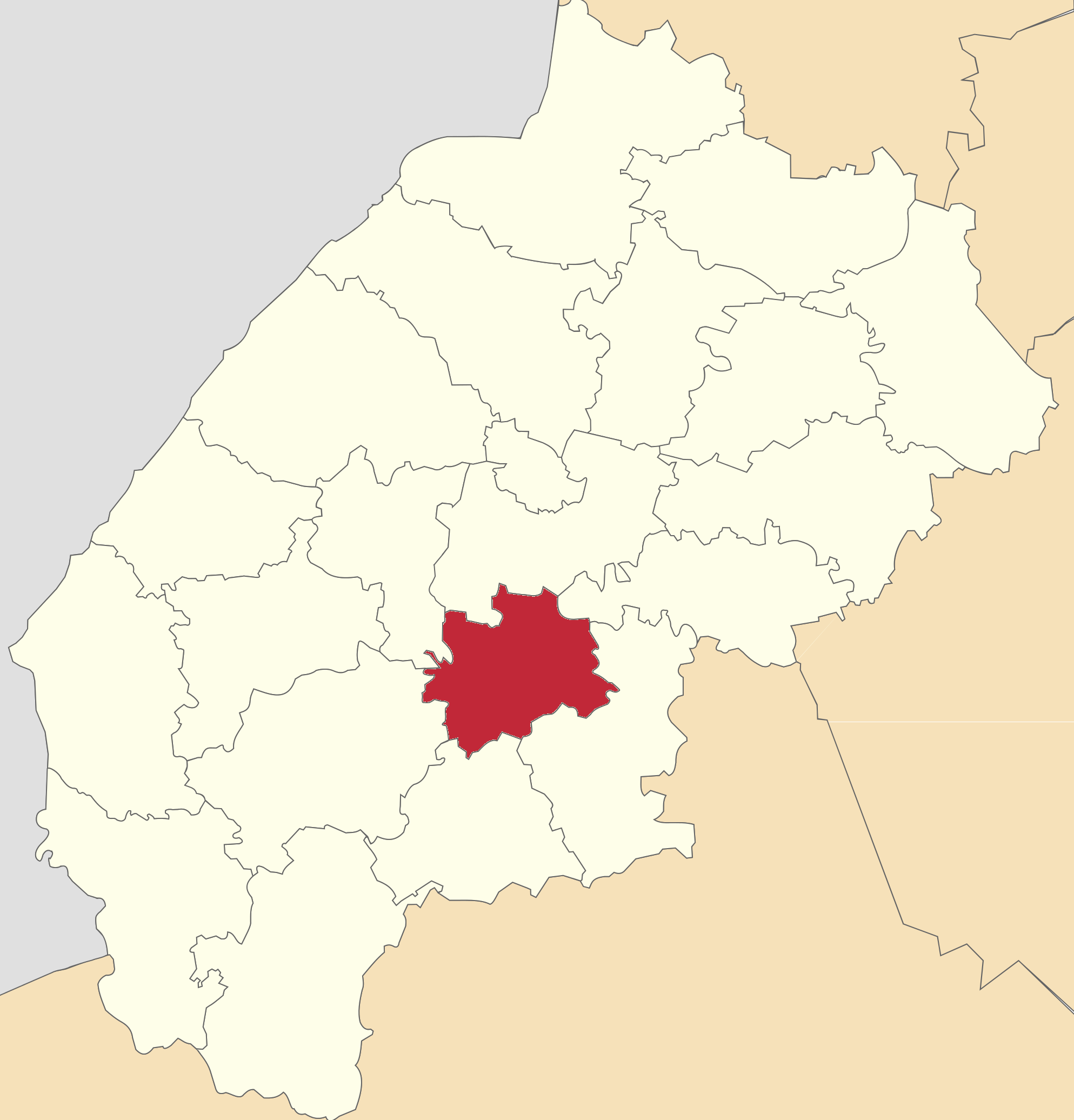
- Coordinates: 49°30′2″N 23°58′24″E
- Country: Ukraine
- Region: Lviv Oblast
- Established: 1939
- Disestablished: 18 July 2020
- Admin. center: Mykolaiv
- Subdivisions: List: — city councils; — settlement councils; — rural councils; Number of localities: — cities; — urban-type settlements; 56 — villages; — rural settlements

Area
  - Total: 675 km^{2} (261 sq mi)

Population (2020)
  - Total: 62,537
  - Density: 92.6/km^{2} (240/sq mi)
- Time zone: UTC+02:00 (EET)
  - Summer (DST): UTC+03:00 (EEST)
- Postal index: 81600—81659
- Area code: 380-3241
- Website: http://www.mykolaiv.lviv.ua/ Mykolaivskyi Raion

Mykolaiv Raion (Ukrainian: Миколаївський район) was a raion (district) in Lviv Oblast in western Ukraine. Its administrative center was Mykolaiv. The raion was abolished on 18 July 2020 as part of the administrative reform of Ukraine, which reduced the number of raions of Lviv Oblast to seven. The area of Mykolaiv Raion was merged into Stryi Raion. The last estimate of the raion population was 62,537 (2020 est.).

It was established in 1939.

At the time of disestablishment, the raion consisted of three hromadas:

- Mykolaiv urban hromada with the administration in Mykolaiv;
- Rozvadiv rural hromada with the administration in the selo of Rozvadiv;
- Trostianets rural hromada with the administration in the selo of Trostianets.

== See also ==
- Administrative divisions of Lviv Oblast
