= List of leaders of the Ukrainian Greek Catholic Church =

Coat of arms of Major Archbishop Sviatoslav

This is a list of leaders of the Ukrainian Greek Catholic Church (formerly known as the Ruthenian Uniate Church or the Uniate Church) which is a sui juris (particular church) of the Catholic Church that is in full communion with the Holy See. As an Eastern Catholic church, it uses the Byzantine rite in the Church slavonic and Ukrainian languages in its liturgies. Leaders have held several titles over the centuries. The modern primate of the church holds the position of a major archeparch (also styled as "major archbishop").

Due to historical circumstances (i.e. Russian occupation), the first hierarchs of the Ukrainian Greek Catholic Church held titles that did not mention the original metropolitan city of Kyiv. It is common for people to refer to the major archbishop as a "Primate". However, only Mykhailo Levitsky officially held that title which was granted by the Austrian Emperor as the Primate of Halychyna and Lodomeria, but not approved by the Pope.

== Metropolitans in the Polish–Lithuanian Commonwealth ==
This is a list of metropolitans in the Polish–Lithuanian Commonwealth.

=== Union of Florence ===
Metropolitans of Kiev, Galicia and all Rus'

- Isidore (1436–1458)
- Gregory the Bulgarian (1458–1473)
- Misail Pstruch (1476–1480)

Following the fall of Constantinople, the Union of Florence fell into abeyance.

=== Union of Brest ===
Metropolitans of Kiev, Galicia and all Rus' of the Union of Brest:

- Mykhailo (1596–1599)
- Ipatii (1600–1613)
- Josyf (1613–1637)
- Rafajil (1637–1640)
- Antin (1641–1655)
- Havryil (1666–1674)
- Kyprian (1674–1693)
- Lev (1694–1708)
- Yurij (1708–1713)
- Lev II (1714–1729)
- Athanasius (1729–1746)
- Florian (1748–1762)
- Felicjan (1762–1778)
- Leo III (1778–1779)
- Jason (1780–1786)
- Theodosius (1787–1805)

== Partitions of Poland ==
Upon the partitions of Poland, the church consisted of three territories: within the Russian Empire; within the Kingdom of Prussia; within the Kingdom of Galicia and Lodomeria of the Habsburg monarchy (later Austrian Empire).

=== Territory within the Russian Empire ===
- Archeparchy of Polotsk, Metropolitan of all Byzantine Catholics in Russia

- Heraklius Lisovskyj (1783 - death 30 August 1809)
- Jan Krasovskyj (22 September 1809 - 1826)
- Jakub Martusevych (1826 - death 26 January 1833)
- Josaphat Bulhak (14 April 1833 - death 9 March 1838);

- Eparchy of Volodymyr–Brest

- Symeon Młocki, O.S.B.M. (1779.09.19 – 1795)
- Josafat Bułhak, O.S.B.M. (1798.10.12 – 1818.09.22),

- Eparchy of Lutsk–Ostroh

- Michał Mateusz Konstanty Stadnicki (1787.01.05 – 1795)
- Stefan Lewiński (1797.06.26 – death 1806.01.23)
- Hryhorij Koxanovyc (Grzegorz Kochanowicz) (1807 – 1814)
- Jakub Martusiewicz (1817 – 1826),

- Archeparchy of Smolensk

- Josyf Lepkovskyj (1771.03.14 – death 1778)

- Eparchy of Lithuania

In 1807 the Russian Empire appointed its own primates for the Ruthenian Uniate Church without the permission of the Pope.

- Irakliy (1808–1809)
- Hryhoriy (1809–1814)
- Josaphat (1818–1838)

Following the Synod of Polotsk (1839), the Ruthenian Uniate Church was abolished on the territory of the Russian Empire. Its property and clergy were forcibly transferred to the Russian Orthodox Church. The only exception to this was the Eparchy of Chełm (in then Congress Kingdom of Poland) which lasted until May 1875 before its faithful were forcibly converted and its property seized by the Russian Orthodox Church.

=== Territory within the Kingdom of Prussia ===
- Eparchy of Supraśl

It had only three incumbents :

- Theodosius Wislocki, Basilian Order of Saint Josaphat (O.S.B.M.) (1797 – death 1801.05.18)
- Nicholas Duchnowski (1803.05.16 – death 1805.06.25)
- Bishop-elect Father Leo Jaworowski (1807 – 1809 not possessed lacking confirmation by Rome), next Auxiliary bishop of Eparch Jozafat Bułhak in Brest and titular bishop of Volodymyr.

=== Territory within the Kingdom of Galicia and Lodomeria (Austrian Empire) ===
Those eparchies that ended up within the Habsburg monarchy were reorganized in 1807. The Eparchy of Lviv was then elevated to an archeparchy and its bishop became a metropolitan bishop governing the rest of the eparchies of the former Ruthenian Uniate Church. The new metropolis received the name of Galicia (Halych) (Note: The name "Galicia" is a Latinized form of Halych, one of several regional principalities of the medieval state of Kievan Rus'.), an echo of the 14th century Metropolis of Halych. Only these hierarchs were fully recognised by the Holy See; those created by the Russian state were not recognised until 1818.

- Archeparchy of Lviv, Metropolitan of Galicia

- Antin II (1808–1814)
- Mykhailo II (1816–1858), also served as a Primate of Halychyna and Lodomeria
- Hryhoriy II (1859–1866)
- Spyrydon (1866–1869)
- Josyf II (1870–1882)
- Sylvester (1882–1898)
- Julian (1899–1900)
- Andrei (1900–1944)
- As the leading bishop, Josyf Slipyj was arrested by the Soviet authorities in 1945. Following the Lviv Council (1946), the Greek Catholic Church was forcibly abolished on the territory of the Soviet Union, and its property and clergy transferred to the Russian Orthodox Church.

- Eparchy of Przemyśl and Sambir

== Ukrainian Greek Catholic Church ==
=== Major Archbishop of Lviv ===
- Josyf III (Josyf Slipyj) (1963–1984, in exile)

In 1963 the Archbishop of Lviv was elevated to the rank of Major archbishop.

=== Major Archbishop of Lviv and Metropolitan of Galicia ===
With fall of the Soviet Union, the title of "Metropolitan of Galicia" (Halych) was revived in 1991.

- Myroslav (1984–2000)
- Lubomyr (2000–2005)

=== Major Archbishop of Kyiv-Galicia ===
On 25 November 1995, the Archiepiscopal Exarchate of Kyiv-Vyshhorod was created under the jurisdiction of Archeparchy of Lviv. Originally, it covered all central, eastern and southern parts of Ukraine. Later (2002-2003), it lost territory to form new exarchates for the eastern and southern regions. On 6 December 2004, the remaining central region of the Exarchate was transformed into the Archeparchy of Kyiv. Since the "Synod of Polotsk" in 1838, Kyiv had been deprived of its own see. At the same time, an ecclesiastical province or "major archeparchy" was erected. The Archeparchy of Kyiv became the principal see of the newly created Major Archeparchy of Kyiv-Halych, and thus a primatial see of the Ukrainian Greek Catholic Church. The episcopal seat of the "Metropolis of Galicia" was transferred from St. George's Cathedral in the city of Lviv to the Cathedral of the Resurrection of Christ in the capital city of Ukraine — Kyiv.

- Lubomyr (2005–2011)
- Sviatoslav (2011–incumbent)
