= Archeparchy of Kiev (Ruthenian Uniate Church) =

Eastern European ecclesiastical territory

The Archeparchy of Kiev (Latin: Archieparchia Metropolitana Kioviensis-Haliciensis) was an ecclesiastical territory or archeparchy of the Ruthenian Uniate Church, a particular Eastern Catholic church. It was erected in the Polish–Lithuanian Commonwealth in 1595/96 following the Union of Brest. It was effectively disestablished by the partitions of Poland (1772–1795). Its successor — the Ukrainian Catholic Major Archeparchy of Kyiv–Galicia — continues to operate in the modern Ukraine. The first metropolitan was Michael Rohoza.

It united the parishes of the Kiev, Nowogródek, Minsk, Vilnius, and Trakai voivodeships, as well as those of the Duchy of Samogitia.

== History ==
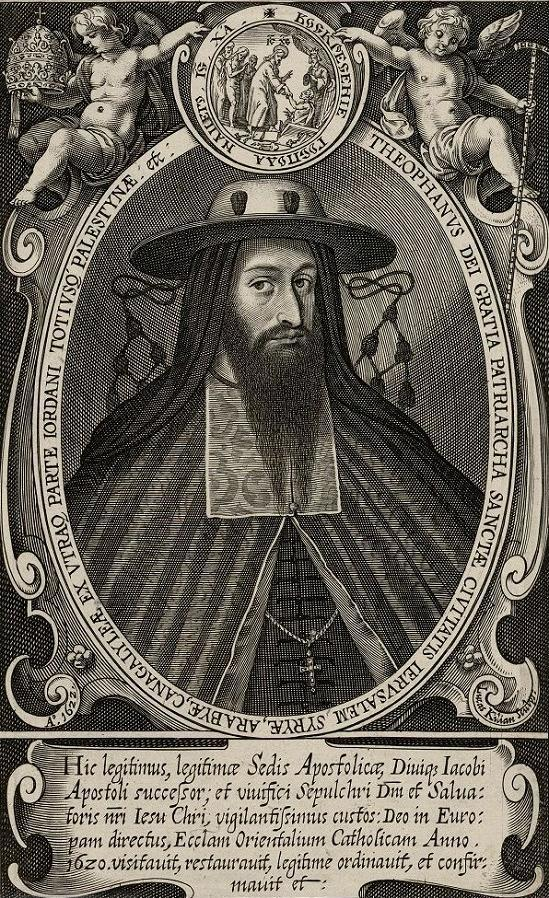
Theophanes III

For much of the 17th century, the Polish–Lithuanian Commonwealth was at war with the Tsardom of Russia. The Khmelnytsky Uprising (1648–1657) also known as the Cossack–Polish War, was a Cossack rebellion in the eastern territories of the Commonwealth, which led to the creation of a Cossack Hetmanate in right-bank Ukraine. As a result, the Kiev and Chernihiv dioceses which lay in the hetmanate were lost to the metropolis as the Cossacks were firmly anti-Catholic.

While most Orthodox bishops in the Polish–Lithuanian Commonwealth supported the Union of Brest, as with the previous Florentine Union, not all of them accepted the union. Some eparchies (dioceses) continued to give their loyalty to Constantinople. These dissenters had no ecclesiastical leaders but with Petro Konashevych-Sahaidachny — the Hetman of the Zaporozhian Cossacks — they had a secular leader who was opposed to the union with Rome. The Cossacks' strong historic allegiance to the Eastern Orthodox Church put them at odds with the Catholic-dominated Commonwealth. Tensions increased when Commonwealth policies turned from relative tolerance to the suppression of the Orthodox church, making the Cossacks strongly anti-Catholic. By that time, the loyalty of the Zaporozhian hetmanate to the Commonwealth was only nominal. In August 1620, the Hetman prevailed upon Theophanes III — the Greek Orthodox Patriarch of Jerusalem — to re-establish an Orthodox metropolis in the realm. Theophanes consecrated Job Boretsky as the new "Metropolitan of Kiev, Galicia and all Ruthenia" and as the "Exarch of Ukraine". There were now two metropolitans with the same title but different ecclesiastical loyalties within the Commonwealth.

By 1686, Russia had complete sovereignty over the lands of the Zaporozhian Sich and left-bank Ukraine, as well as the city of Kiev. The Eternal Peace Treaty of 1686 which was concluded by Russia and the Commonwealth affirmed this reality. As a result, the Greek Catholic population in those areas suffered oppression and many deaths. It also spelled an end to the independence and unity of the Hetman state. The Starodub, Chernihiv, and other territories in left-bank Ukraine went to Russia; the rest remained in the Commonwealth.

The end of the Commonwealth came with the partitions of Poland when the Russian Empire, the Kingdom of Prussia and the Habsburg monarchy divided the realm between them. Following the partitions, its successor states treated the Uniate Church differently:

- In the territory annexed by the Russian Empire, the Church was effectively dissolved; most of the eparchies were forcibly converted to the Russian Orthodox Church after the Synod of Polotsk of 1839.
- In the territory of the Congress Kingdom of Poland the Eparchy of Chełm-Belz was united in Conversion of Chełm Eparchy to the Orthodox Church in 1875
- In the territory annexed by the Kingdom of Prussia, the Eparchy of Supraśl operated from 1798 to 1809. Following the Treaties of Tilsit, the territory was annexed by the Russian Empire. As a result, this eparchy was effectively dissolved and reunited to the Eparchy of Brest, the territory was later converted to the Russian Orthodox Church in 1839.
- In the territory annexed by the Austrian Empire (the Kingdom of Galicia and Lodomeria), the Church continued to operate as a Greek Catholic Church. A similar situation continued in the Second Polish Republic of 1918 to 1939. It was suppressed in the Soviet Union from 1946 but survived to become the core of the Ukrainian Greek Catholic Church from 1989.

== List of metropolitans ==
The below is a list of metropolitans of "Kiev, Galicia and all Ruthenia":

- 1596—1599 Michael Rohoza
- 1600—1613 Hypatius Pociej
- 1613—1637 Joseph Velamin-Rutski
- 1637—1640 Rafajil Korsak
- 1641—1655 Antin Sielava
- 1666—1674 Havryil Kolenda
- 1674—1693 Kyprian Zochovskyj
- 1694—1708 Lev Zalenskyj
- 1708—1713 Yurij Vynnyckyj
- 1714—1729 Lev Kiszka
- 1729—1746 Athanasius Szeptycki
- 1748—1762 Florian Hrebnicki
- 1762—1778 Felicjan Filip Wołodkowicz
- 1778—1779 Leo Szeptycki
- 1780—1786 Jason Smogorzewski
- 1787—1805 Theodosius Rostocki
