= Ukrainian Catholic Eparchy of Vilnius =

Ukrainian Greek Catholic eparchy in Lithuania

Ruthenian Catholic Eparchy of Vilnius (or Vilnius of the Ruthenians) and its successor Žyrovyci of the Ruthenians were the only eparchy (Eastern Catholic diocese) in Lithuania of the Ruthenian Uniate Church (sui iuris, Byzantine Rite in Ruthenian language), but short-lived (1809-1828-1833).

== History ==
The bishopric was established in 1809 as Ruthenian Catholic Eparchy of Vilnius (of the Ruthenian Uniate Church), on (then Russian-imperial) territory, not previously served by the particular church.

It was suppressed in 1828, but immediately replaced by the Ruthenian Catholic Eparchy of Žyrovyci, to which its last incumbent was appointed, only to be suppressed again in 1839 after the Synod of Polotsk (that declared its union to the Russian Orthodox Church), without a Catholic successor. The last Bishop became the first Bishop of the Russian Orthodox Diocese of Lithuania.

== Episcopal ordinaries ==
(all Ukrainian Rite)

=== Eparchs (Bishops) of Vilnius of the Ruthenians ===
- Hryhorij Koxanovyc (Grzegorz Kochanowicz) (1809 – 1810), previously Auxiliary Bishop of Lutsk–Ostroh of the Ukrainians (Ukraine) (1798.04.20 – 1807) succeeding as Eparch (Bishop) of Lutsk–Ostroh of the Ukrainians (1807 – 1814); later Metropolitan Archeparch (Archbishop) of Kyiv–Halyč of the Ukrainians (Ukraine) (1810 – death 1814)
  - Auxiliary Bishop: Bishop-elect Adrijan Holovnja (Holownia), Basilian Order of Saint Josaphat (O.S.B.M.) (1809.09.22 – 1811)
- Apostolic Administrator Josafat Bułhak, (O.S.B.M.) (1814 – 1818 see below), while Eparch of Volodymyr–Brėst of the Ukrainians (Ukraine) (1798.10.12 – 1818.09.22); previously Eparch of Pinsk–Turaŭ of the Ruthenians (Belarus) (1787.04.24 – 1798.10.12) and Apostolic Administrator of Kyiv–Halyč of the Ukrainians (Ukraine) (1817.01.27 – 1818.09.22)
- Josaphat Bulhak, O.S.B.M. (see above 1818 – 1828, see suppressed: see below), also Metropolitan Archbishop of Kyiv–Halyč of the Ukrainians (Ukraine) (1818.09.22 – 1838.03.09), first Eparch of successor see Žyrovyci of the Ukrainians (Lithuania) (1828 – 1833.04.14)

=== Eparchs (Bishops) of Žyrovyci of the Ruthenians ===
- Josafat Bułhak, O.S.B.M. (see above 1828 – 1833.04.14); later Archeparch of Polatsk–Vitebsk of the Ruthenians (Belarus) (1833.04.14 – death 1838.03.09)
- Józef Siemaszko (1833.04.02 – 1839.02.12 but see suppressed as Catholic eparchy after the Synod of Polotsk of 1839); previously Latin Auxiliary Bishop of Roman Catholic Diocese of Płock (Poland) (1829.04.21 – 1833.04.02), later (1839-1868) Orthodox Archbishop; died 1869

== See also ==
- the Archdiocese of Vilnius (initially a bishopric)

== Sources and external links ==
- GCatholic - Vilnius
- GCatholic - Žyrovyci
