= Archeparchy of Polotsk–Vitebsk (Ruthenian Uniate Church) =

Eastern Catholic ecclesiastical territory in Poland-Lithuania (1596-1839)

The Archeparchy of Polotsk-Vitebsk was an archeparchy of the Ruthenian Uniate Church that was situated in the Polish–Lithuanian Commonwealth. From 1596 to 1839, it was a suffragan eparchy of the Metropolis of Kiev, Galicia and all Ruthenia. The cathedral church of the archeparchy was Cathedral of Saint Sophia in the city of Polotsk.

== History ==
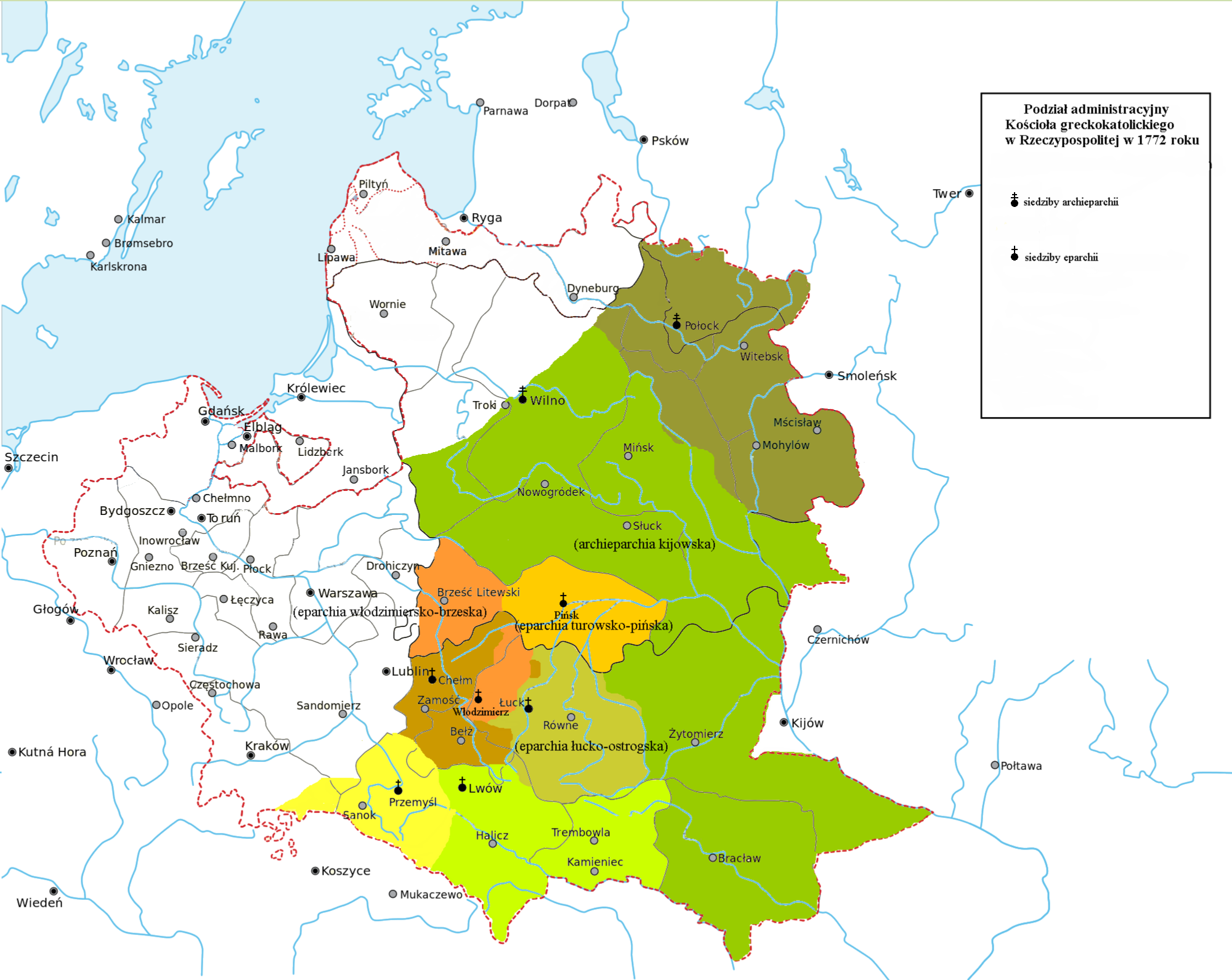
Eastern Catholic eparchies within the Polish–Lithuanian Commonwealth in 1772. The most northerly one, in brown, is the Archeparchy of Polotsk

Previously an Eastern Orthodox eparchy founded in 992 and headed by a suffragan bishop of the Kiev Metropolitan in Vilnius, in 1596 the eparchy of Polotsk, entered in full communion with the Catholic Church as a Greek Catholic Church through the Union of Brest. The eparchy was among the first that joined the union in 1596 along with eparchies of Kiev, Pinsk, Lutsk, Volodymyr and Kholm. Due to the Union of Brest, Belarus, the former Orthodox Church became known as the Ruthenian Uniate Church.

To the archeparchy of Polotsk were later added the territories of the eparchy of Mstislav (also of 13th-century origin) and the 10th-century eparchies of Orsha and Vitebsk.

Due to its proximity to Vilnius, the eparchy played a key role in the church life and many of its bishops later became the Metropolitan bishops of Kiev, a hierarch of the Ruthenian Uniate Church. Those include Havryil Kolenda, Kyprian Zochovskyj, Lev Zalenskyj and many others.

In the 1800s, the archeparchy was classified by the Catholic Church as a Ruthenian jurisdiction.

The Russian imperial government (re)united the archeparchy on 25 March 1839 to the Russian Orthodox Church after the Council of Polotsk. It has no official Catholic successor (even if a new Belarusian Greek Catholic Church was founded, the current Apostolic administrator is Sergiusz Gajek).

== Episcopal ordinaries ==
(Byzantine Rite)

Non-metropolitan Ruthenian Catholic Archeparchs of Polotsk(-Vitebsk)

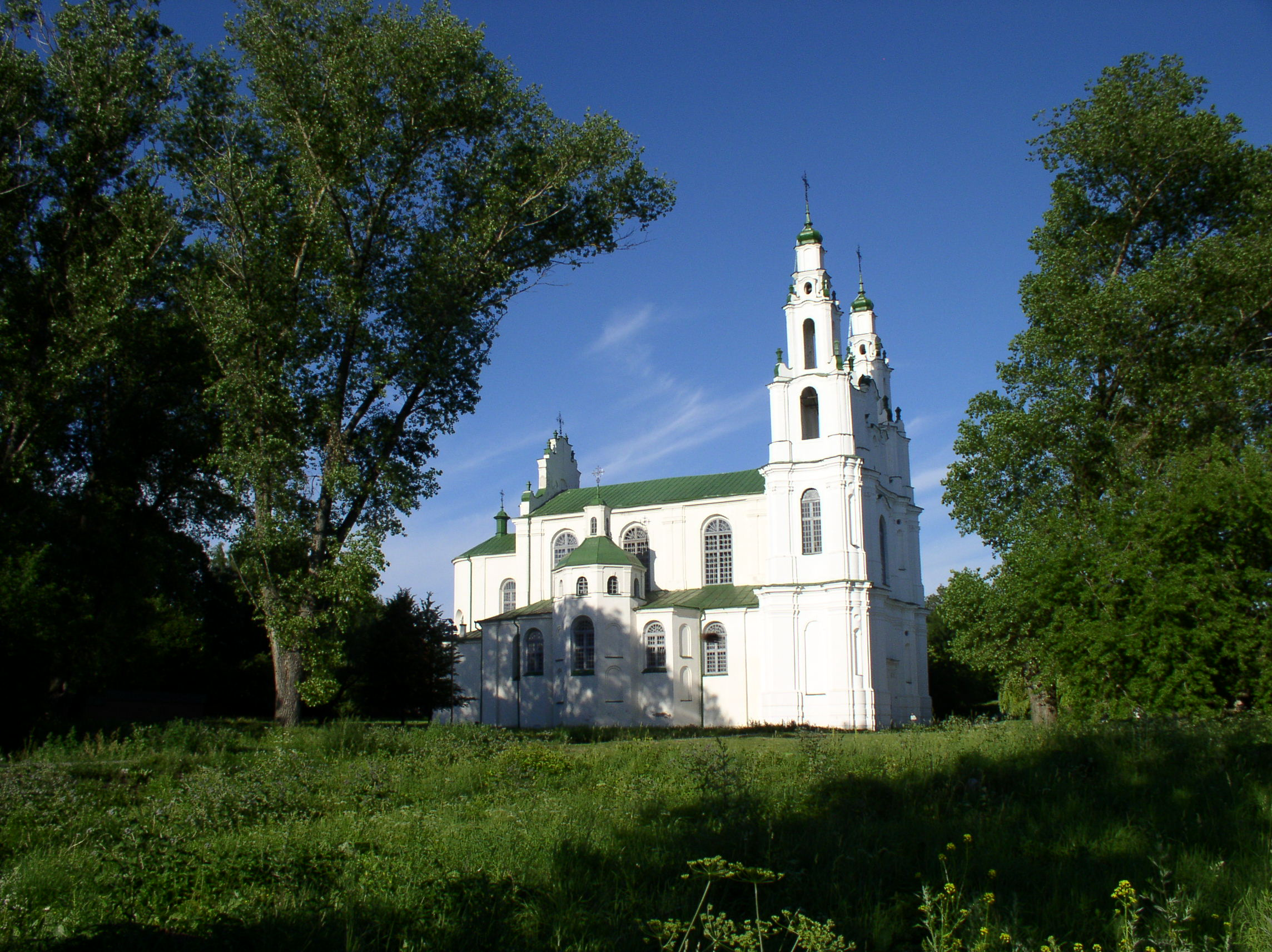
Catholic cathedral of St.Sophia, Polotsk

- Herman Zahorskyj (1596 - death 1600/1601)
- Gedeon Brolnitskyj (26 May 1601 - death 1618)
- Saint Josaphat Kuntsevych, Order of Saint Basil the Great (O.S.B.M.) (born Ukraine) (1618 - death 12 November 1623); previously Founder of Basilian Order of Saint Josaphat (1607), Coadjutor Archbishop of Polatsk–Vitebsk of the Ruthenians (1617 – succession 1618.03)
- Antin Sielava (1624 - death 1655)
- Havryil Kolenda (1655 - death 21 May 1674), succeeding as former Coadjutor Archbishop of Polatsk–Vitebsk of the Ruthenians (– 1655)
- Kyprian Zochovskyj (21 May 1674 - death 1693)
- Lev Zalenskyj
- Markian Bilozor (1697 - death 18 June 1707); previously Coadjutor Bishop of Pinsk–Turaŭ of the Ruthenians (Belarus) (? – 1665), succeeding as Eparch (Bishop) of Pinsk–Turaŭ of the Ruthenians (1665 – 1697)
- Sylvester Peshkevych (9 November 1710 - death 8 September 1714)
- Florian Hrebnitskyj (1715 - death 18 July 1762)
- Jason Smogorevskyj (18 July 1762 - 25 June 1781), succeeding as former Coadjutor Archbishop of Polatsk–Vitebsk of the Ruthenians (? – 1762.07.18); later Metropolitan Archbishop of Kyiv–Halyč of the Ukrainians (Ukraine) (1781.06.25 – death 1788)
- Heraclius Lisovsky (1783 - death 30 August 1809)
- Jan Krasovskyj (22 September 1809 - 1826); next transferred Archbishop-Bishop of Lutsk–Ostroh of the Ukrainians (Ukraine) (1826 – death 1827.08.23)
- Jakub Martusevych (1826 - death 26 January 1833), previously Eparch (Bishop) of Lutsk–Ostroh of the Ukrainians (Ukraine) (1817 – 1826)
- Josaphat Bulhak (14 April 1833 - death 9 March 1838); previously Bishop of Pinsk–Turaŭ of the Ruthenians (Belarus) (1787.04.24 – 1798.10.12), Eparch (Bishop) of Volodymyr–Brėst of the Ukrainians (Ukraine) (1798.10.12 – 1818.09.22), Apostolic Administrator of Vilnius of the Ukrainians (Lithuania) (1814 – 1818), Apostolic Administrator of Kyiv–Halyč of the Ukrainians (Ukraine) (1817.01.27 – 1818.09.22), Eparch (Bishop) of Vilnius of the Ukrainians (Lithuania) (1818 – 1833.04.14), Metropolitan Archeparch (Archbishop) of Kyiv–Halyč of the Ukrainians (Ukraine) (1818.09.22 – 1838.03.09), Eparch (Bishop) of Žyrovyci of the Ukrainians (Lithuania) (1828 – 1833.04.14).

== See also ==
- List of Catholic dioceses in Belarus
- Ukrainian Greek Catholic Church
  - Ruthenian Catholic Church
- Eastern Catholic Churches
- Polish–Lithuanian Commonwealth
- Synod of Polotsk

== Sources and external links ==
- GCatholic, with Google satellite photo
