= Monastery of the Holy Trinity, Vilnius =

Church building in Vilnius, Lithuania

Coordinates: 54°40′30.82″N 25°17′18.58″E

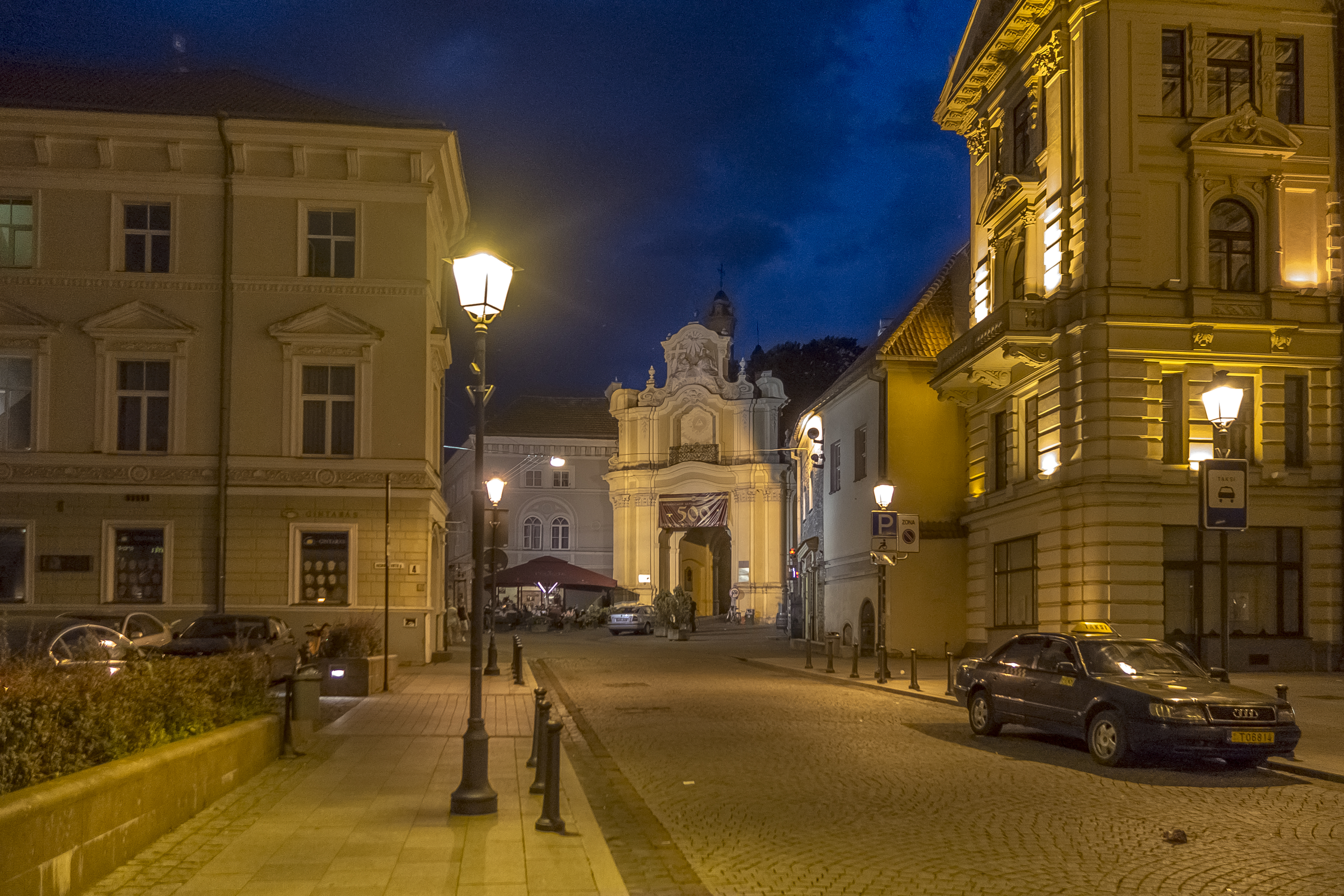
The Basilian Gate as seen from the city's central street

Monastery of the Holy Trinity (Ukrainian: Монастир Святої Трійці, Lithuanian: Vienuolynas ir Šv. Trejybės cerkvė, Polish: monaster św. Trójcy) is a monastery built in Vilnius by the Ruthenian Church and Grand Hetman of Lithuania Konstanty Ostrogski as a thanksgiving to the God for the victory in Battle of Orsha. It now belongs to the Order of Saint Basil the Great and the Ukrainian Greek Catholic Church. At the Greek Catholic Church of the Holy Trinity the Christian worships are held only in Ukrainian.

The church is dedicated to the Holy Trinity. Beside this church, the monastery compound contains a fortified entrance gate, a university, a hotel complex for visitors, monastic cells including the Konrad's cell. The church is surrounded by adjoining four towers at each corner.

This monastery is associated with the Union of Brest personalities like Josaphat Kuntsevych, Archbishop of Polatsk who took vows here and spent first years of his monastic life, as well as a prominent reformer of the Basilian Order, Veliamyn Rutsky.

== History ==
=== The church ===
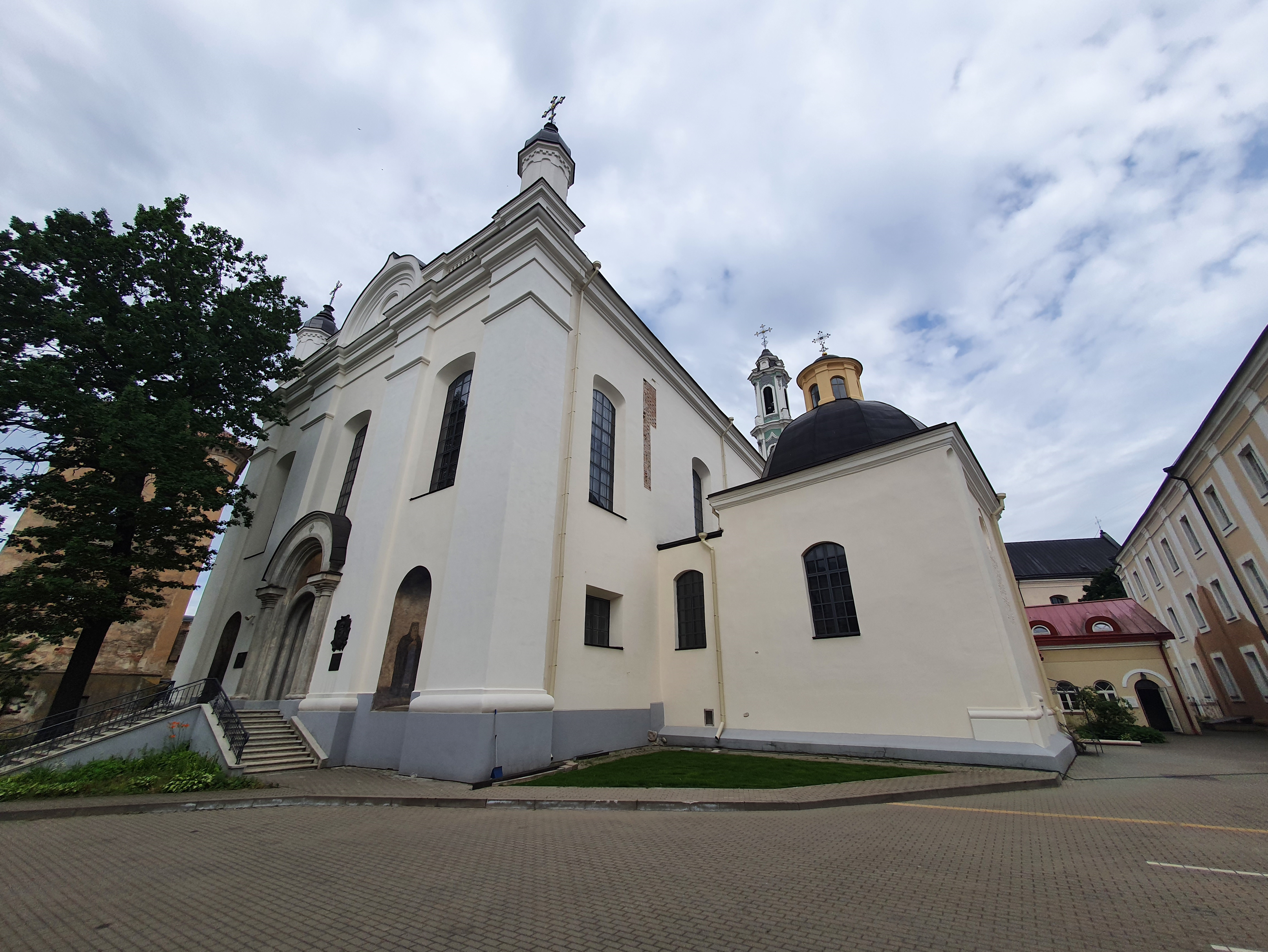
Front façade of the Greek Catholic Church of the Holy Trinity in Vilnius

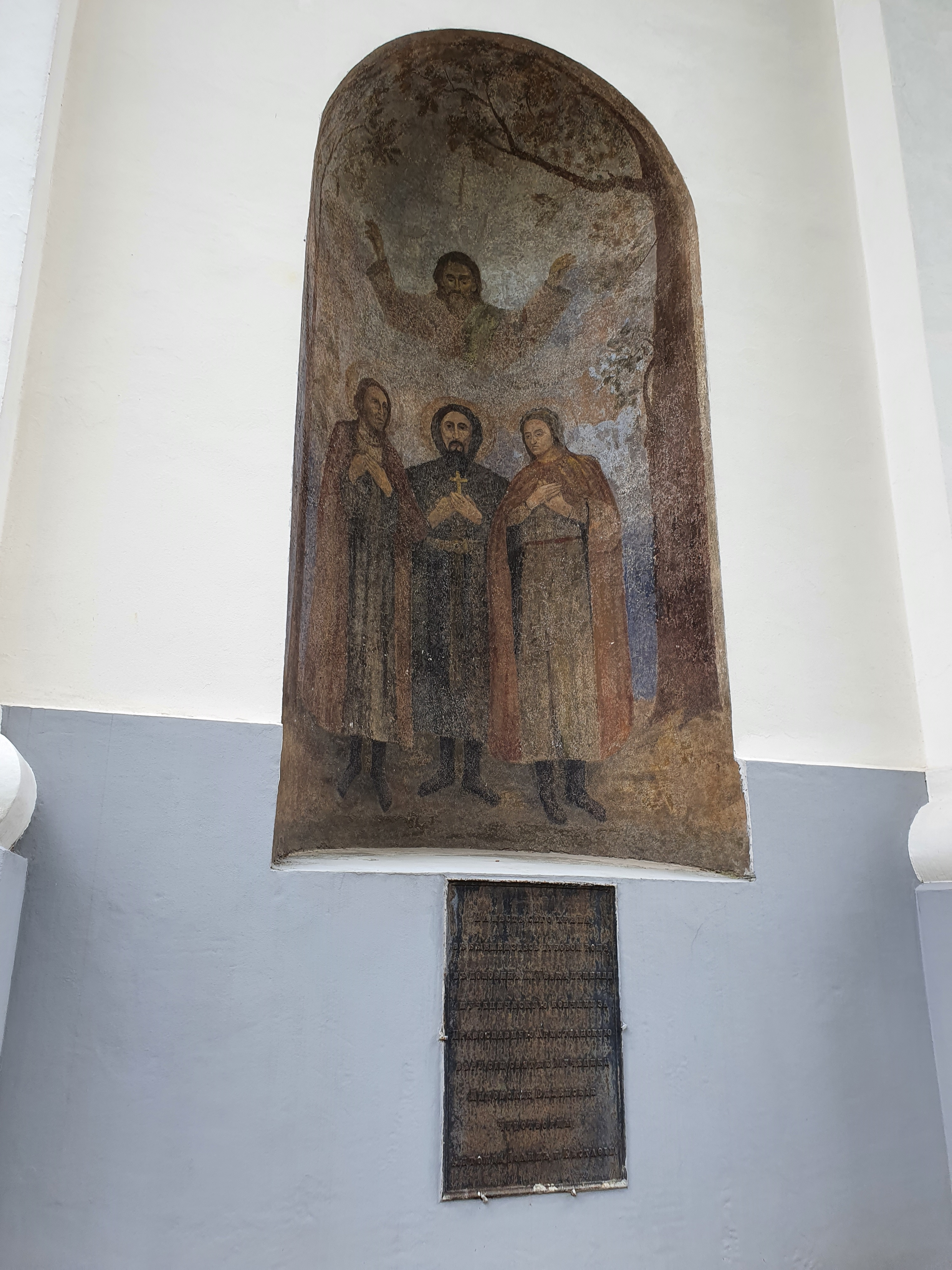
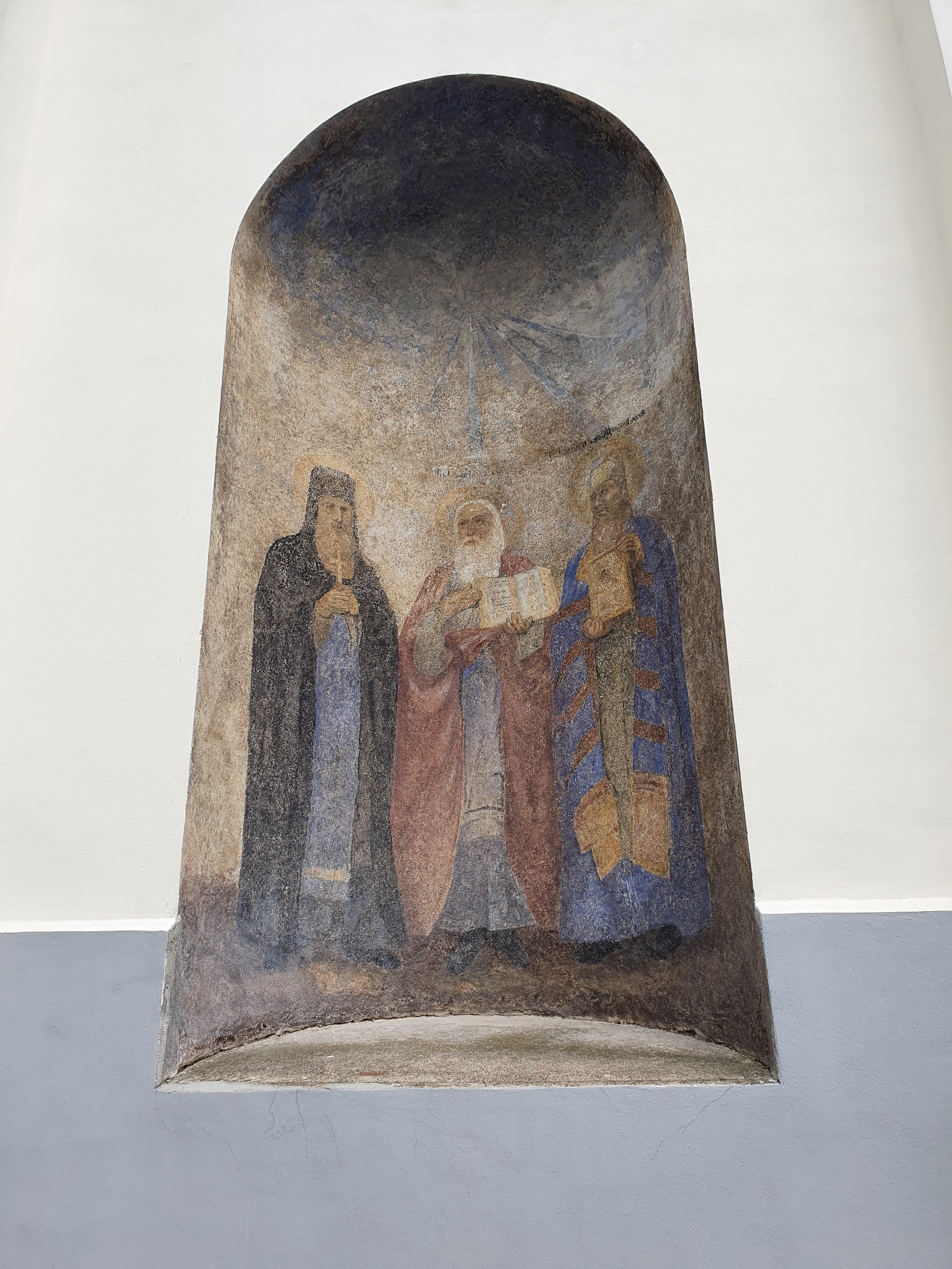
Front façade frescoes of the Greek Catholic Church of the Holy Trinity in Vilnius

According to a legend, the first wooden church was built in the 14th century by Grand Princess Uliana of Tver, a spouse of the Grand Prince Algirdas. The church was built in place where in 1347 the Algirdas noblemen Antony, Johan, and Eustachy died as the first martyrs for Christian faith and the first Christian saints in the Grand Duchy of Lithuania.

The first stone church of Holy Trinity with a belfry was built by Konstanty Ostrogski in 1514 as a token of appreciation for a victory of Polish-Lithuanian forces over Muscovite troops near Orsha (Battle of Orsha). The original church was built in Gothic style. In first half of the 17th century to the church were added three chapels. In 1609 on an edict of the King of Poland Sigismund III Vasa the church and monastery was transferred to the Basialian Order.

The first chapel Annunciation of the Holy Theotokos was built on the funds of Janusz Skumin Tyszkiewicz and was located to the right from the main entrance. In the chapel's crypt were buried father of the founder, Theodor Skumin-Tyszkiewicz (d.1618), the founder himself, and his wife, Barbara Naruszewicz (d.1627). In the chapel is preserved her marble gravestone, a work of Italian masters. Nowadays in the chapel are constantly held liturgies in Byzantine rite.

The second chapel that is located to the left of main entrance called St.Luke was built in 1622 on the funds of Eustachy Korsak-Hołubicki, a big supporter of the Union (Union of Brest). Beside its founder, in the crypt underneath the chapel rest his sons Ivan and Grigori. To this noble family of Korsaks belongs archimandrite the Basilian monastery of Vilnius Rafajil Mykola Korsak, later – a proto-archimandrite of the Basilian Order, Metropolitan of Kiev for Eastern-rite Catholics.

The third chapel is called Exaltation of the True and Life-creating Cross of our Lord. The founder of this chapel with a family crypt was a scribe of Grand Duchy of Lithuania Jan Kolenda in 1628.

In the church survived valuable tombstones. Unique landmark of the Renaissance epoch in Lithuania is a tombstone of Vilna Burgomaster Othanasius Braha and his son Antony with a coat of arms, Cyrillic inscription and rich floral ornament dated 1576. Draws attention a tombstone of Jelenski sisters with sentimental inscription which comes from 1758.

In 1670 significant funds to renew the church contributed Great Hetman of Lithuania Michał Kazimierz Pac and Great Treasurer Hieronymus Kryszpin-Kirchenstein, particularly towards the altar of Saint Josaphat Kuntsevych.

The Basilian monks were banished from the monastery in 1821 and the wing of the men's monastery was converted into a prison. Between 1823 and 1824, Romantic poet Adam Mickiewicz and other Vilnius University students, members of the Filaret Association were imprisoned in the monastery for their engagement in secret organizations fighting for the Polish–Lithuanian Commonwealth independence from the Russian rule.

=== Vilna icon of Theotokos Hodegetria ===
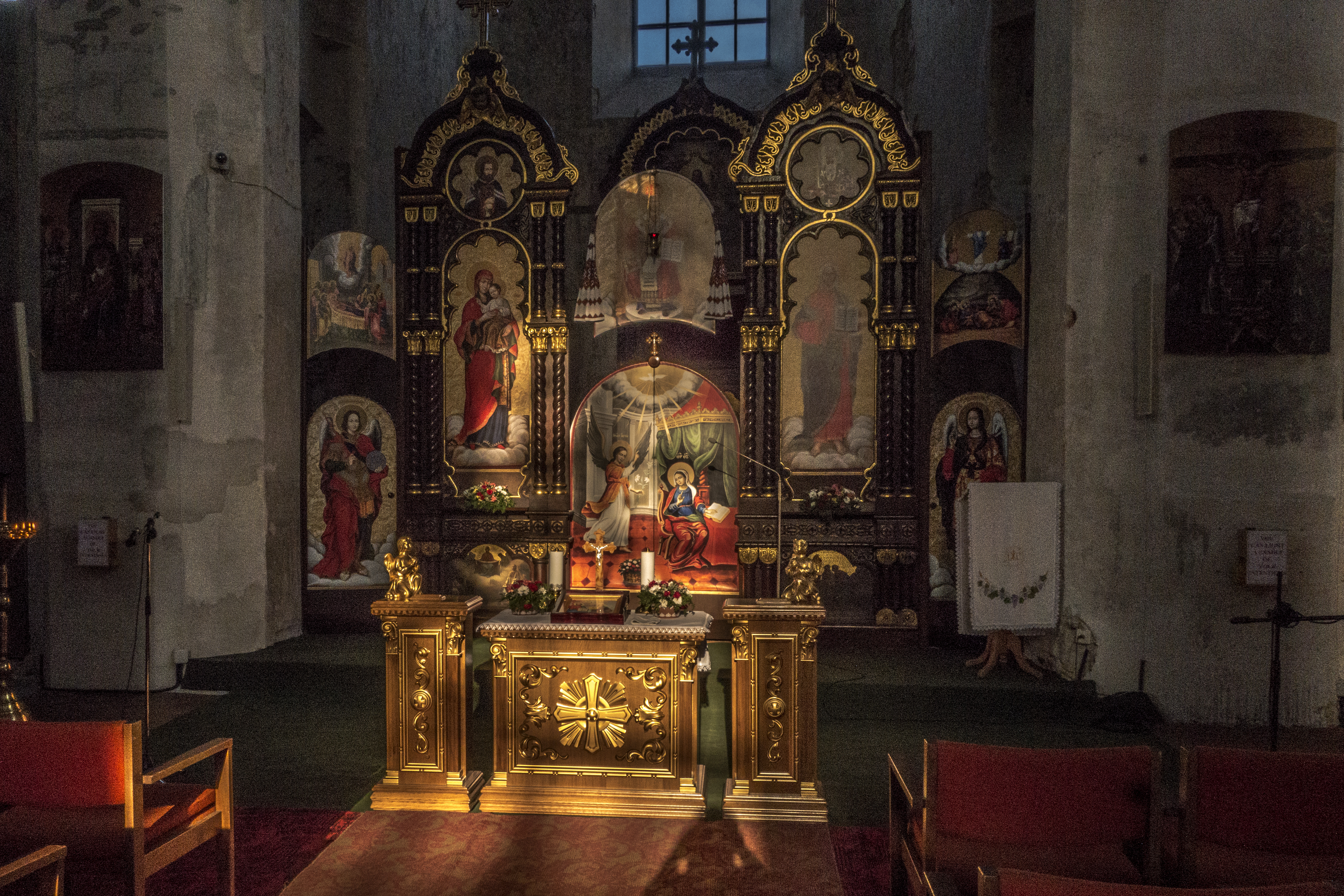
Main altar of the church

The fate of Vilna icon of Theotokos Hodegetria (Theotokos of Vilna) that for two centuries (1715—1915) was located in the church of Holy Trinity is unknown. According to a legend, the icon was written by St.Luke the Evangelist and for long years it was an ancestral relic of Greek emperors in Constantinople. It is believed that a niece of the last Byzantine Emperor, Sophia Palaiologina who married the Great Prince of Muscovy Ivan III of Moscow, brought the icon to Moscow. While unconfirmed, there exists another version that the icon was transferred to the Great Prince of Moscow from prince of Halych who received it sometime ago as a present from Byzantine Emperors. Regardless of its past history, the fact states that Ivan III blessed his daughter Helena of Moscow with the icon when he gave her out in marriage for the Great Prince of Lithuania Alexander Jagiellon. The icon was brought to the capital of Grand Duchy of Lithuania and received name of Vilna. In 1866 during restoration, it was discovered that the top level is egg based tempera paint indicating very old origin of the icon. In 1915 at times of World War I during evacuation the icon was taken away from Vilnius and to this day location of Theotokos of Vilnius is unknown.

== Archimandrites ==
- 1481–94 Macarius I of Kiev
- 1611 Josyf Veliamyn Rutsky
- 1614 Josaphat Kuntsevych
- 1625 Rafajil Korsak

== Gallery ==
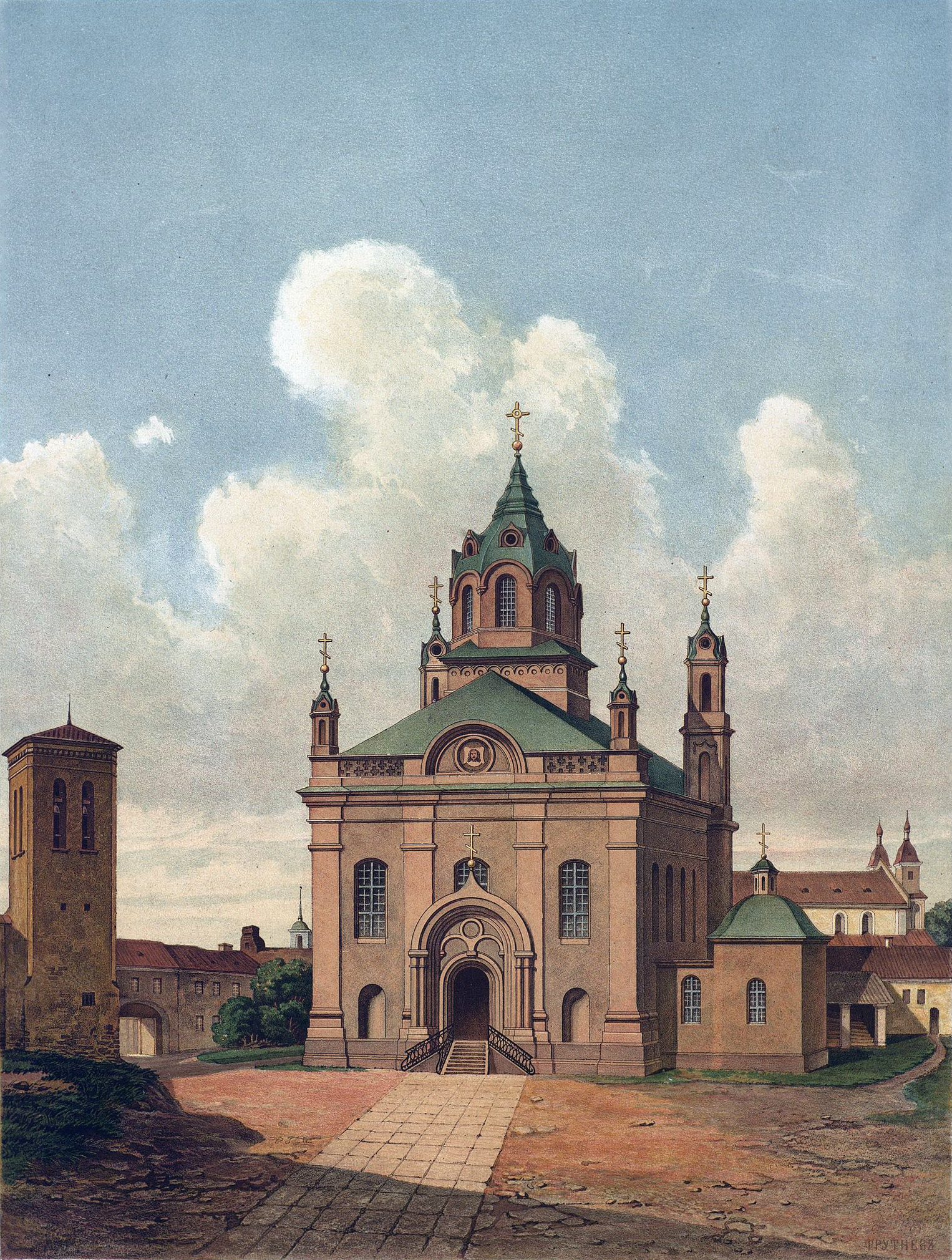
The church in 1870

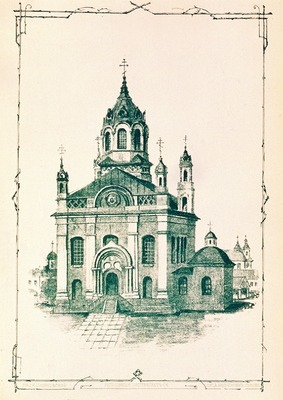
The 1896 sketch of the church during the Russian occupation

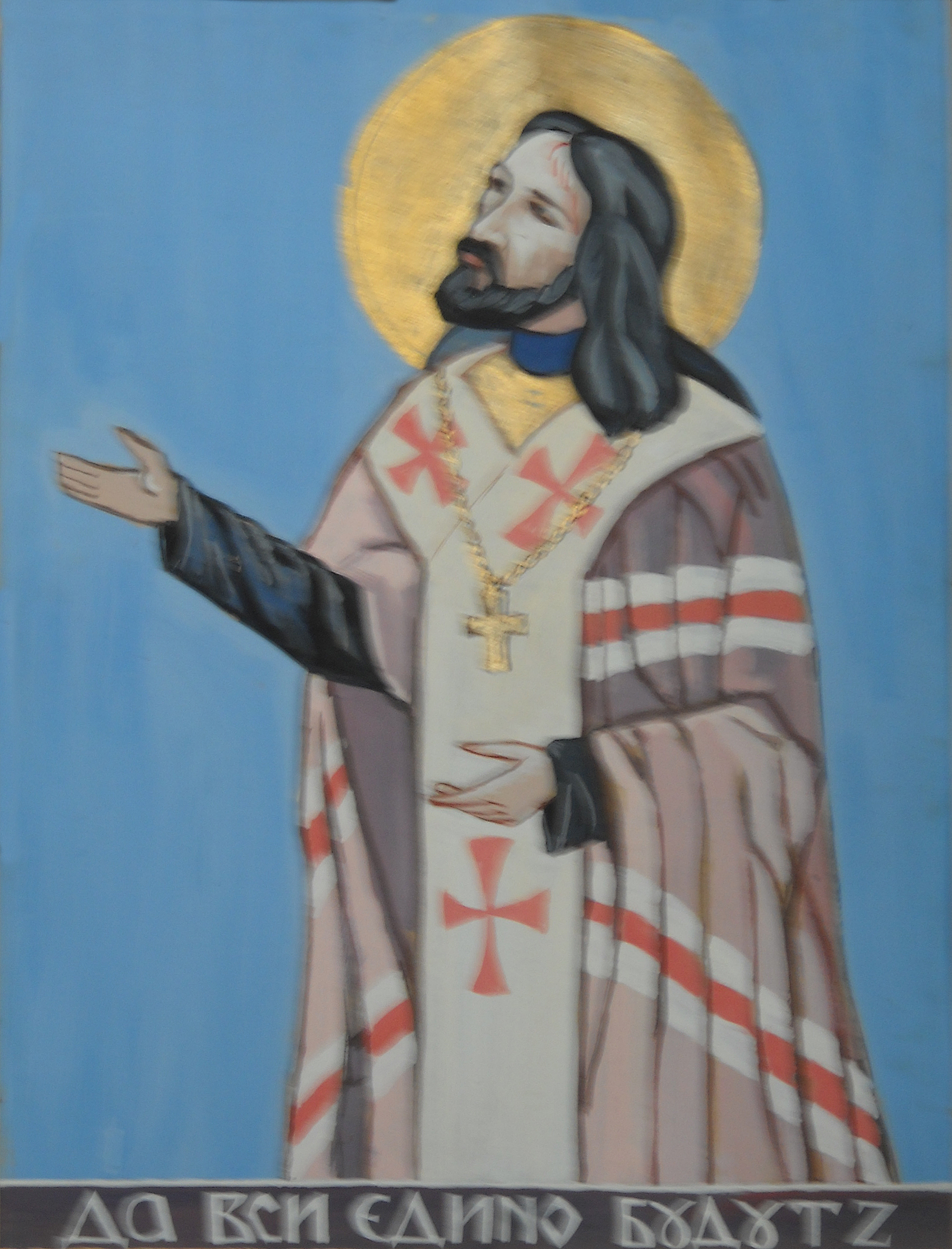
Depiction of St Josaphat, "And all will be together"

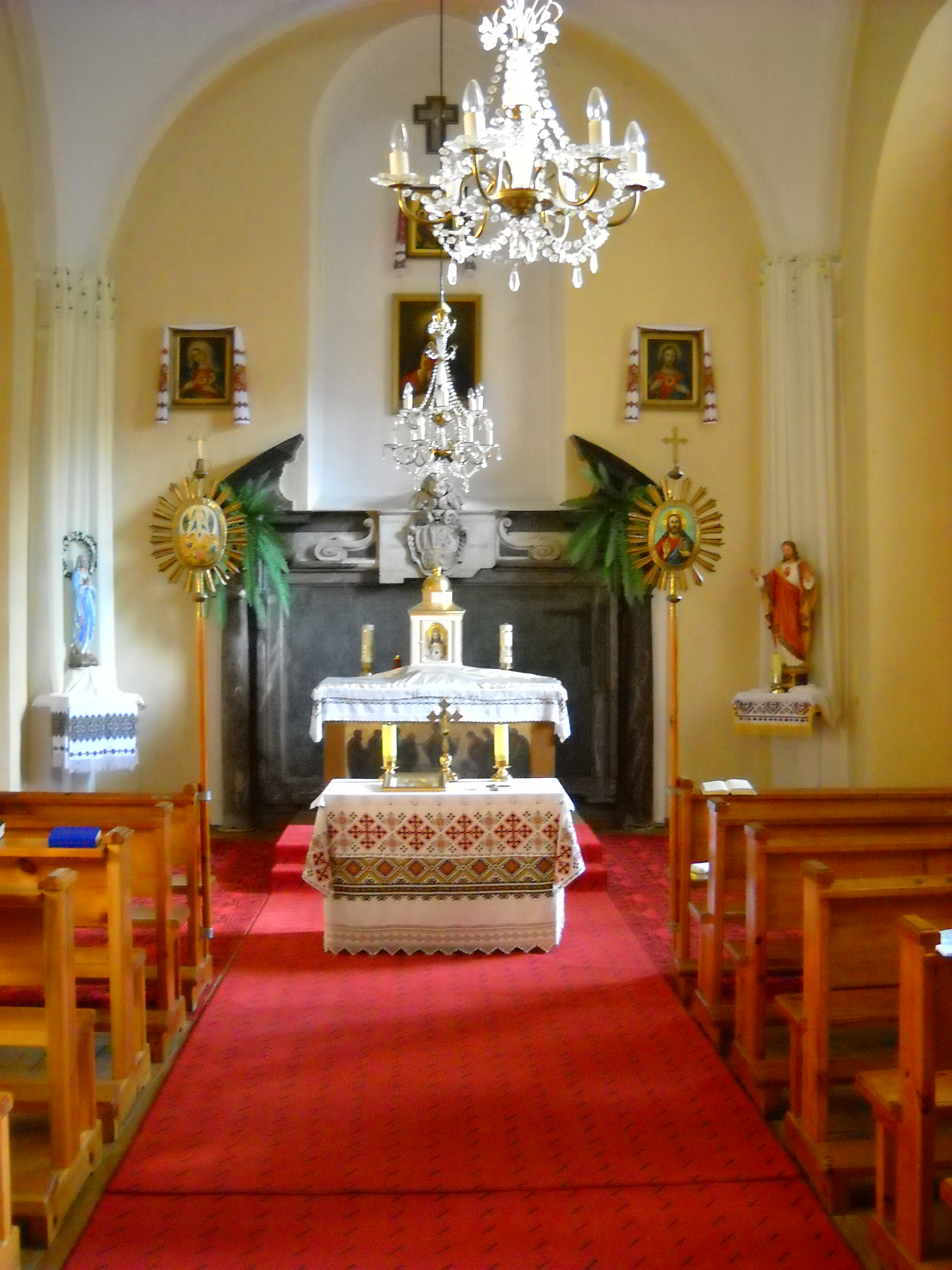
Interior of a chapel

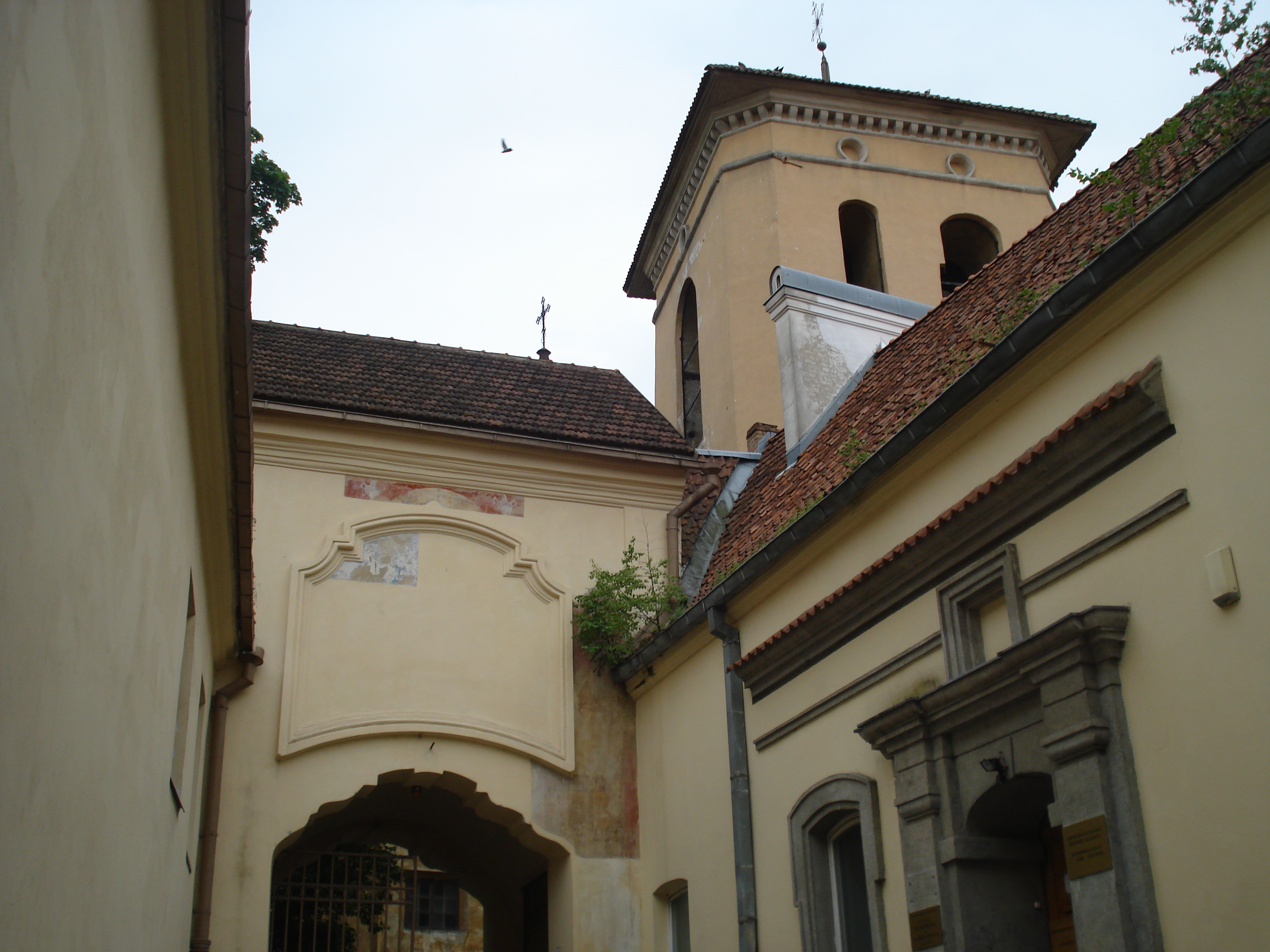
Inner gates and belfry

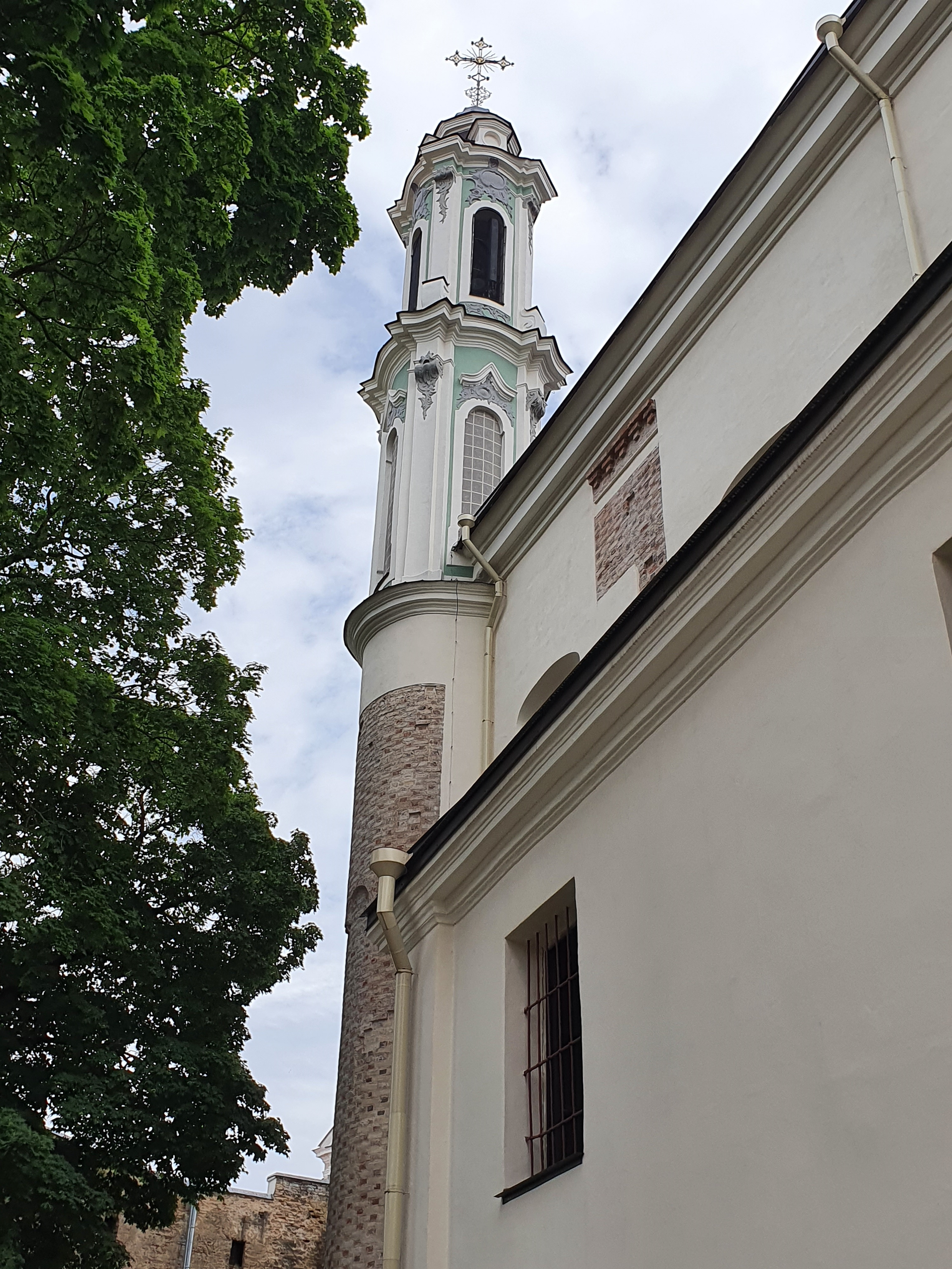
One of the church's towers

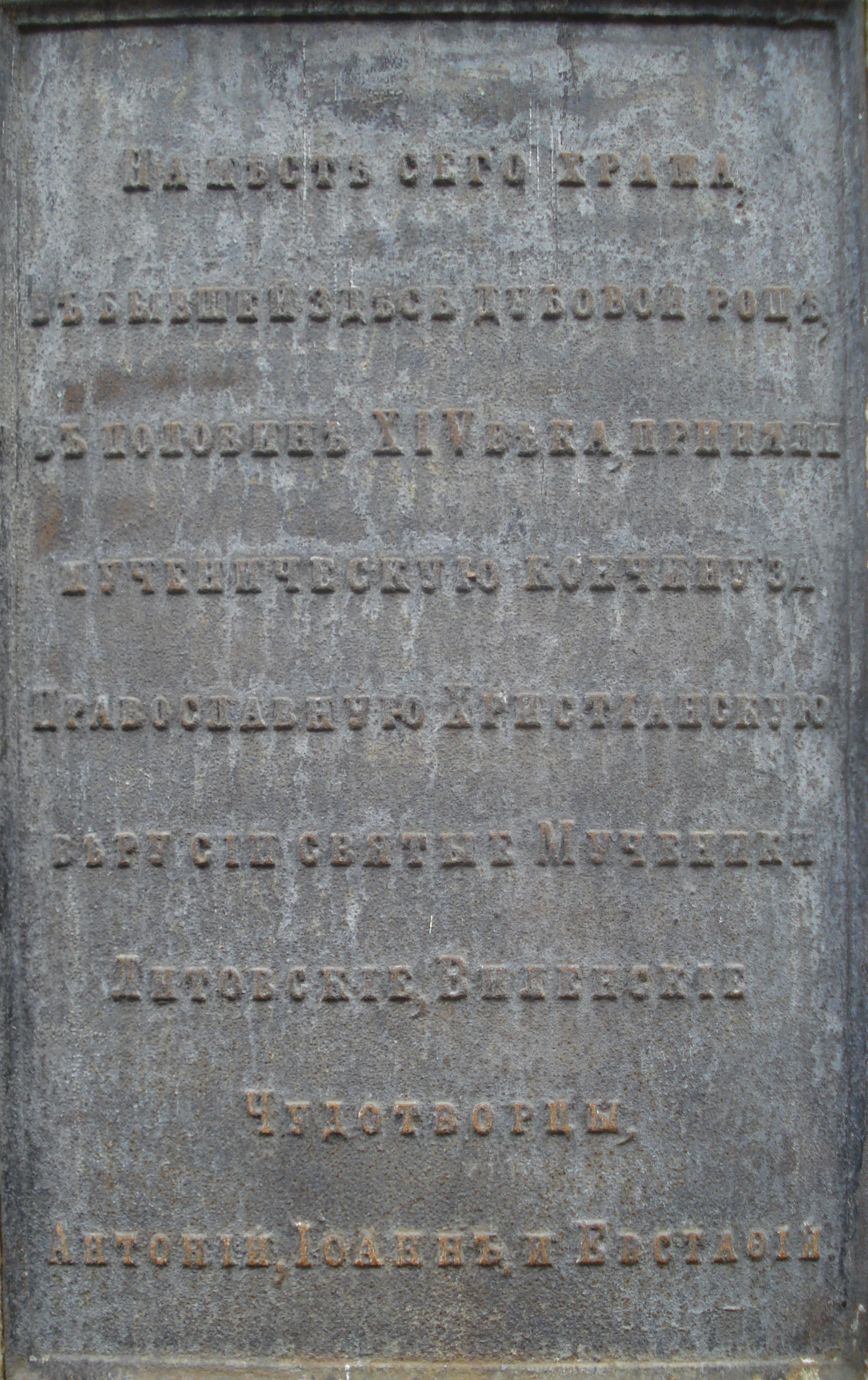
Commemorative plaque for martyrs inside the church

== See also ==
- Cathedral of the Theotokos, Vilnius
