= Ruthenian Catholic Archeparchy of Smolensk =

Former Eastern Catholic eparchy in the Polish-Lithuanian Commonwealth

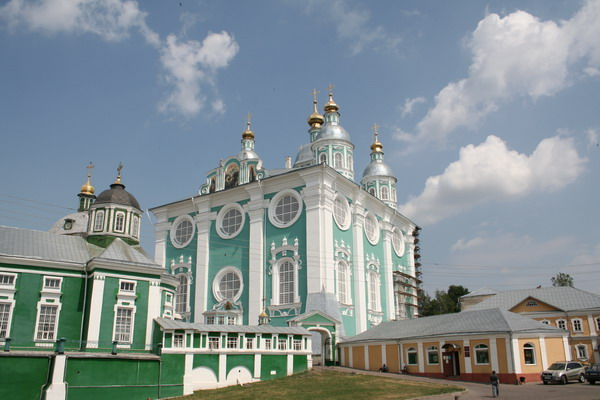
Assumption Cathedral (Smolensk)

The Ruthenian Catholic Archeparchy of Smolensk (Latin: Dioecesis Smolenscensis Ruthenorum, Polish: Arcybiskupstwo smoleńskie) was an archeparchy of the Metropolis of Kiev, Galicia and all Ruthenia in the Ruthenian Uniate Church from 1625 to 1778. It was situated in the Polish–Lithuanian Commonwealth in what is today the Smolensk Oblast of the Russian Federation. It used the Byzantine Rite in its services. It was also known as the Ruthenian Catholic Archdiocese of Smolensk or Smoleńsk of the Ruthenians.

== History ==
It was established in 1625 on Polish–Lithuanian Commonwealth territory, previously without proper Ruthenian Catholic jurisdiction. Earlier in 1611, after Smolensk was occupied by the Polish army in the same year, there was established the Roman Catholic Diocese of Smolensk but in 1654 Smolensk returned to be a Russian city and both the Roman Catholic and the Greek Catholic Bishops had to go in the Polish territory. The Ruthenian Uniate Eparchy became a titular see.

It was suppressed in 1778, without a successor jurisdiction, at its last incumbent's death (territory formally united to the Archeparchy of Polotsk-Vitebsk).

== Episcopal ordinaries ==
Eparchs (Archbishops) of Smolensk

- Leo Kreuza-Revuskyj = Lev Revuckyj Krevza, a Vilnius Archmandrite (1625 – death 1639)
- Andrej Kvasninskyj-Zlotyj = Andrzej Kwaśniński-Złoty (1640 – 1654), next Bishop of Pinsk-Turaŭ of the Ruthenians (in Belarus) (1654 – death 1665)
- Michael Pashkovskyj = Myxajlo Paškovskyj (1666 – death 1670)
- Mytrofan Drutskyj Sokolynskyj = Mytrofan Druckyj Sokolynskyj (1671 – death 1690)
- Jurij Malejevskyj (1690 – death 1696)
- Joasaphat Hutorovych = Josafat Hutorovyč (1697 – death 1702)
- Gedeon Shumljanskyj = Hedeon Šumljanškyj (1703 – death 1705)
- Michael Tarnovskyj = Myxajlo Tarnovskyj (1714? – death 1718.02.18)
- Leo Drutskyj Sokolynskyj = Lavrentij Druckyj Sokolynskyj, Basilian Order of Saint Josaphat (O.S.B.M.) (1719 – death 1727.05.15)
- Antin Tomylovyc = Antin Tomylovyč (1736? – death 1745.04.23)
- Tsezarij Stebnovskyj = Cezarij Stebnovskyj (1757? – death 1762)
- Heraclius Lisanski = Iraklij Lisanski (1763 – death 1771.03.14)
- Josyf Lepkovskyj (1771.03.14 – death 1778), succeeding as former Coadjutor Bishop of Smoleńsk of the Ruthenians (? – 1771.03.14)

== See also ==
- List of Catholic dioceses in Russia

== Sources and external links ==
- GCatholic
- catholic-hierarchy
