= Heraclius Lisovsky =

Ruthenian Uniate bishop (1734–1809)

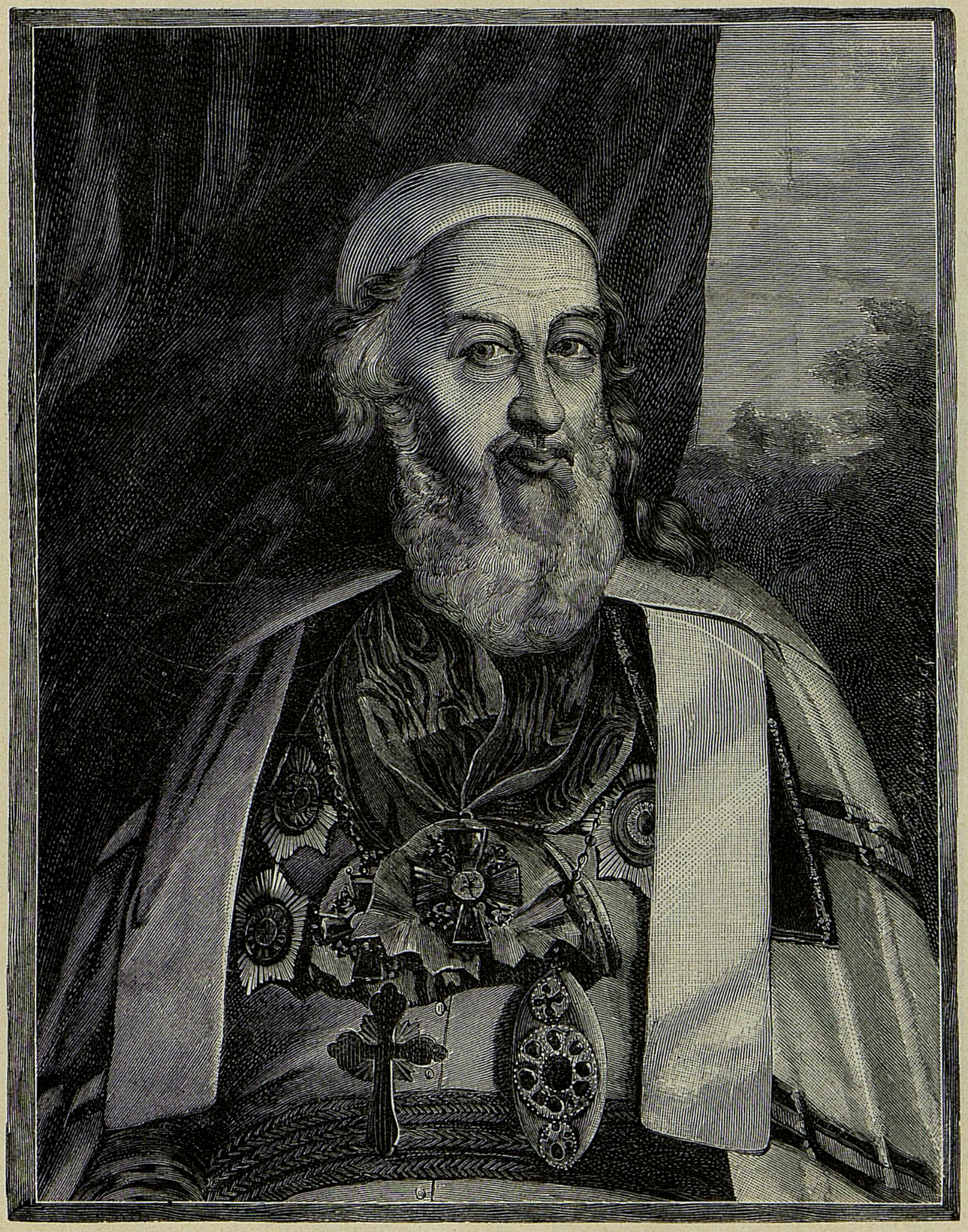
Heraclius Lisovsky

Heraclius Lisovsky or Heraclius Listovsky (born as Józef Lissowski; 1734 – 30 August 1809) was a bishop of the Ruthenian Uniate Church served at first as administrator for Metropolitan see of the Uniate Church in the Russian Empire.

Lisovsky was born in a town of Ushachy, Polotsk Voivodeship, Polish–Lithuanian Commonwealth.

Lisovsky joined the Order of Saint Basil the Great already after finishing his elementary education. He continued his education in Polotsk specializing in study of philosophy and theology. Eventually Lisovsky became a heguman of Polotsk and then Orsha monasteries. Later he also became a priory member of the Polotsk Uniate Consistory. It was at this position when Lisovsky became acquainted with the Russian Empress Catherine the Great who in 1784 appointed him as the archbishop of Polotsk. Lisovsky was ordained as a bishop on 18 April 1784 by bishop of Pinsk and Turov Gedeon Horbatsky. At his new post, Lisovsky had actively uprooted Latinized innovations that were introduced to Uniate ritual by uniate clergy of past times and compiled a new Uniate Hieratikon (Ritual book).

Following the 1795 final (third) partition of Poland and detention of the metropolitan bishop Theodosius Rostocki in Saint Petersburg, Lisovsky was appointed as an administrator of the Uniate Church by the Russian Empress. Yet after the death of Catherine in 1796 his influence in the church was paralyzed as uniate affairs were transferred to the Russian Roman Catholic metropolitan Archbishop of Mohilev Stanisław Bohusz Siestrzeńcewicz.

After the death of Theodosius in 1805 and during the ongoing Napoleonic Wars, the Russian Emperor Alexander I created a special department for Uniate affairs within the Roman Catholic Collegium and appointed Lisovsky as the Metropolitan of Uniate Church in Russia. On 24 July 1806, Lisovsky was officially approved as Metropolitan of Kiev and all Ruthenia (Russia). In 1807 he established the Polotsk Uniate Theological Seminary (after the Synod of Polotsk in 1839 turned into Eastern Orthodox Seminary). At that time, there were four eparchies of the Ruthenian Uniate Church in Russia Vilno, Polotsk, Lutsk, and Brest, while eparchy of Pinsk and Turov was suppressed in 1795.

On 30 August 1809, Lisovsky died in the Orsha Monastery, Mogilev Governorate. Before his death he appointed bishop of Lutsk and Ostroh Gregory Kokhanovych as his successor.
