= Eparchy of Volodymyr–Brest =

Eparchy of the Ruthenian Uniate Church

The Eparchy of Volodymyr–Brest (Latin: Vladimirensis–Brestensis Rutenorum, also known as Volodymyr–Brėst of the Ukrainian) was an eparchy (equivalent to a diocese in the Latin Rite) of the Ruthenian Uniate Church from 1596 until 1795. It was situated in the Polish–Lithuanian Commonwealth between the rivers Bug and Styr on territory that is today located in parts of the modern states of Ukraine and Belarus. The eparchy was a suffragan of the Metropolis of Kiev, Galicia and all Ruthenia.

== History ==
It was established in 1596. Following the partitions of Poland, the territory of the eparchy was absorbed by the Tsardom of Russia. Consequently, in 1795 the eparchy was suppressed and the incumbent ordinary — Simeon Młocki — was obliged to resign. It was partially reestablished in 1798 when the Eparchy of Brest was erected on 12 October 1798; Josaphat Bulhak was appointed as the first eparch. This diocese too was suppressed thirty years later on 4 May 1828.

== List of eparchs ==
- Hypatius Pociej, (O.S.B.M.) (1596 – 15 November 1600)
- Joakym Morokhovskyj, O.S.B.M. (1613 – death 1631.03.19)
- Józef Bakowiecki-Mokosiej, O.S.B.M. (1632 – death 1654)
- Jan Michał Pociej, O.S.B.M. (1655 – death 1666)
- Benedykt Gliński, O.S.B.M. (1666 – death 1678)
- Lev Slubyč-Zalenskyj, O.S.B.M. (1678 – 1695.09.19)
- Lev Luka Kiszka, O.S.B.M. (1711 – death 1728)
- Korneliusz Lebiecki, O.S.B.M. (1729.09.03 – death 1730.01.22)
- Teodozy Teofil Godebski, O.S.B.M. (1730 – death 1756.09.12)
- Felicjan Filip Wołodkowicz (Feliks Filipp Volodkovič), O.S.B.M. (1758.11.22 – death 1778.02.01)
- Symeon Młocki, O.S.B.M. (1779.09.19 – 1795)
- Josaphat Bulhak, O.S.B.M. (1798.10.12 – 1818.09.22) as the eparch of the "Eparchy of Brest"
  - Coadjutor Bishop: Antin Zubko (1833.12.11 – 1839.03.25), no other prelature.

== See also ==
- List of Catholic dioceses in Belarus
- List of Catholic dioceses in Ukraine

== Sources and external links ==
- GCatholic - data for all sections
- Catholic Hierarchy - Diocese of Volodymyr et Brėst

Specific
