= Rafajil Korsak =

Metropolitan of Kiev, Galicia and all Ruthenia (1637–1640)

Rafal Korsak (Raphael Korsak)
- Metropolitan of Kiev
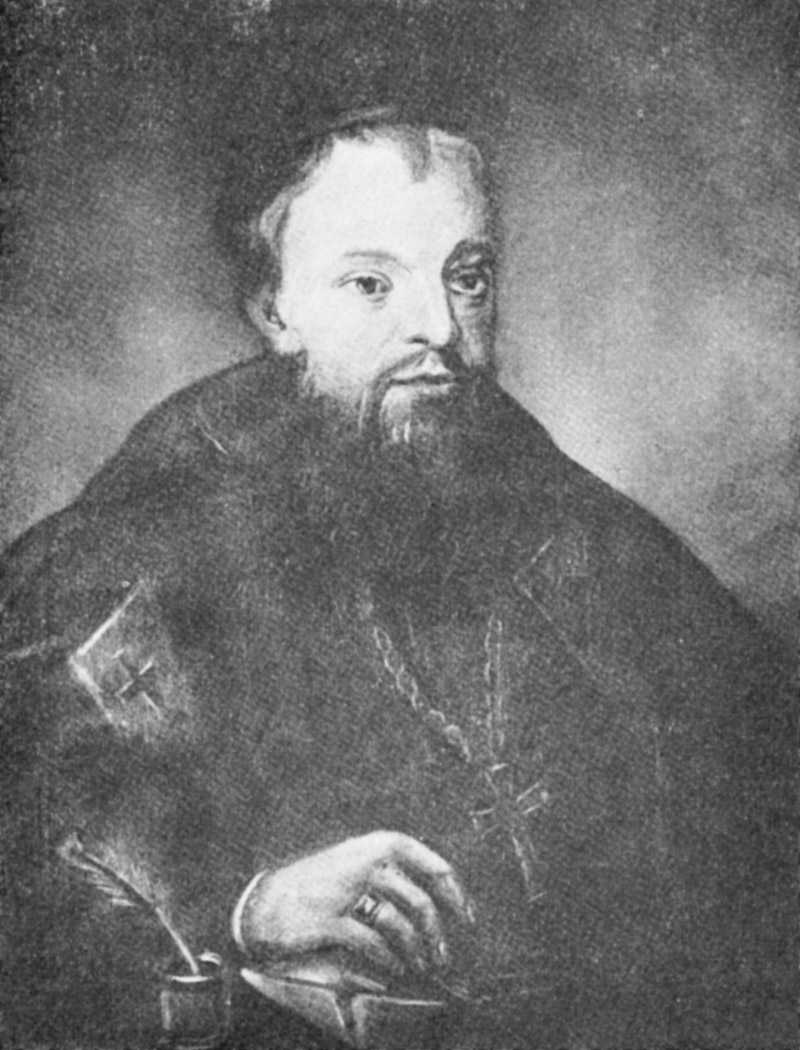
- Church: Ruthenian Uniate Church
- Appointed: 5 February 1637
- Term ended: 28 August 1640
- Predecessor: Joseph Velamin-Rutski
- Successor: Anthony Sielava

Orders
- Consecration: Sept 1626 (Bishop)

Personal details
- Born: between 1598 and 1601 near Navahrudak
- Died: 28 August 1640 Rome

Rafajil Nikolai Korsak (Belarusian: Рафал Мікалай Корсак, Ukrainian: Рафаїл Корсак, Polish: Rafał Mikołaj Korsak) (c. 1599 – 28 August 1640) was the "Metropolitan of Kiev, Galicia and all Ruthenia" (Note: The title is also known as the Metropolis of Kiev, Halych and all Rus' or Metropolis of Kyiv, Halychyna, and All-Rus'. The name "Galicia" is a Latinized form of Halych, one of several regional principalities of the medieval state of Kievan Rus'.) in the Ruthenian Uniate Church — a sui juris Eastern Catholic Church in full communion with the Holy See. He reigned from 1637 until he died in 1640.

== Life ==
Mikalai Korsak was born near Navahrudak from a noble Calvinist family. Primaries sources disagree on his birth year, which anyway can be fixed into a range from 1598 to 1601. He was studied by the Jesuits in Niasviž and Vilnius, and later in Papal Missionary College in Braniewo and by the Jesuits in Prague. By the Jesuits, he converted to the Latin Church, and later, supported by Metropolitan Jazep Velamin-Rutski, he joined the Greek Catholic Church. In 1620, he entered in the Order of Saint Basil the Great, taking the religious name of Rafajil (Rafael), and passed his year of novitiate in the monastery of Byten. He studied in the Greek College in Rome from December 1621 to November 1624, when he was requested to return to his country to serve as a bishop.

In 1625, Korsak became archimandrite of the monastery of the Holy Trinity in Vilnius (the main monastery of the Order), in 1626 Proto-Archimandrite (i.e. Superior general) of the whole order (an office he kept till 1636) and in September 1626 he was consecrated a bishop with the title of Galicia. Metropolitan Rutsky chose him as coadjutor bishop with the right of succession, and so he was confirmed by Rome on 9 March 1631 notwithstanding the King's initial concern about his young age. In 1632, he became Eparch (bishop) of Pinsk.

In 1632 the situation of the Greek-Catholic Church had a downturn because of the death of the King Sigismund III who had supported the Church since the Union of Brest. The new king, Władysław IV, in order to be elected, was compelled to sign the "Pacta Conventa" which was favorable to the Orthodox faction, supported by the Cossacks, and prejudicial to the Greek-Catholic Church. Korsak was sent to Rome to find support for the position of his Church, as he succeeded to do. He remained in Rome from 1633 to 1635.

Metropolitan Rutsky died on 5 February 1637, and Korsak became the new Metropolitan of Kiev and head of the Greek-Catholic Church. As with his predecessor, he continued to negotiate with the prelates of the Metropolis of Kiev, Galicia, and all Ruthenia who remained loyal to the Ecumenical Patriarchate of Constantinople. In particular, he engaged with Metropolitan Peter Mogila, seeking a way to unify the Church in Ukraine. However, in 1639, he had to return to Rome for the third time at the request of the pope (visit ad Limina). He arrived in Rome in September 1639 and passed the winter there. In 1640 he fell ill and died in Rome on 28 August 1640. He was buried in the Greek Rite church of Santi Sergio e Bacco.

He wrote a biography of Metropolitan Rutsky, and he translated in Latin the works of Meletius Smotrytsky.

== Sources ==
The Golden Horde: The Encyclopedia. The 3 tons / red. GP Pasha and others. Volume 2: Cadet Corps - Jackiewicz. - Minsk: Belarusian Encyclopedia, 2005. - 788 s.: Il. ISBN 985-11-0378-0.

Encyclopedia. At 6 vols 4: The Cadets - Leschenya / Belarusian. Encyclopedia.; Editorial Board.: GP PASHKOV (Chief Ed.) And others.; Sett. EE Zhakevich. - Mn.: BelEn, 1997. - 432 p.: Il. ISBN 985-11-0041-2.

Entsiklopediya istoriї of Ukraine: V. 5: Con - Kyu / Editorial Board.: VA Smolichi (head) that in. National Academy of Sciences of Ukraine. Istoriї Institute of Ukraine. - K.: B-"Naukova Dumka", 2008. - 568 p.

Nazarko I. Metropolitans of Kiev and Galician: Biographical Sketches (1590-1960) . - Rome, 1962.

On Sat Praha-Vilnius, 1981: Florovský Antonín V., Čeští jezuité na Rusi. Jezuitské provincie a slovanský východ, Prague, Vyšehrad 1941.

Poor SN Papacy and Ukraine. Politics Rymskoy chickens at Ukrainian lands in XVI-XVII centuries. K., 1989.

Wise S. Essay on the History of the Church in Ukraine. Ivano-Frankivsk, 1999.

Sapelyak A. Kiev church in Slavic East. Canonico-ecumenical aspect. Buenos Aires, Lviv, 1999.

== Notes ==
Ruthenian Uniate Church titles
Preceded by	Archimandrite of Vilna Holy Trinity Monastery; 1625 – 1637	Succeeded by
Preceded by	Archimandrite of Zhydychyn St Nicholas Monastery; 1637 – 1640	Succeeded by
Preceded by Hryhoriy Mykhalovich	Bishop of Pinsk and Turaw; 1632 – 1637	Succeeded by Pakhomiy Oranski
Preceded by Josephus Rutski	Metropolitan of Kiev, Galicia and all Ruthenia; 1637 – 1640	Succeeded by Antonius Sielava
