= Kyprian Zochovskyj =

Metropolitan of Kiev, Galicia and all Ruthenia (1674–1693)

- Metropolitan of Kiev
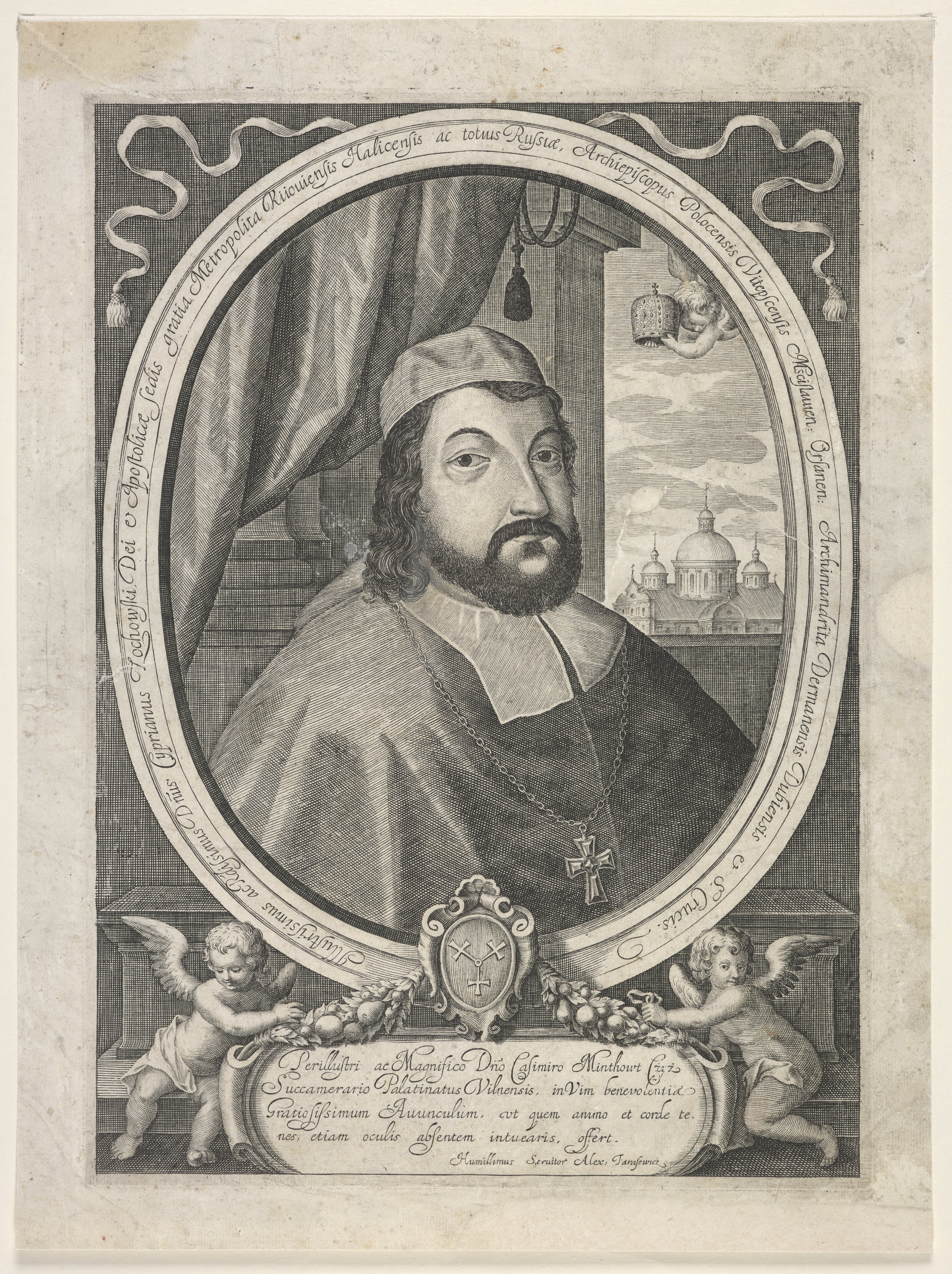
- Church: Ruthenian Uniate Church
- Appointed: 11 February 1674
- Term ended: 26 October 1693
- Predecessor: Havryil Kolenda
- Successor: Lev Zalenskyj

Orders
- Ordination: 29 April 1663 (Priest)
- Consecration: 15 March 1671 (Bishop) by Havryil Kolenda

Personal details
- Born: 1635
- Died: 26 October 1693 (aged 57–58)

Kyprian Zochovskyj (Ukrainian: Кипріян Жоховський, Belarusian: Кіпрыян (Цыпрыян) Жахоўскі Kipryjan (Cypryjan) Žachoŭski, Polish: Cyprian Żochowski) (1635—1693) was the "Metropolitan of Kiev, Galicia and all Ruthenia" (Note: The title is also known as the Metropolis of Kiev, Halych and all Rus' or Metropolis of Kyiv, Halychyna, and All-Rus'. The name "Galicia" is a Latinized form of Halych, one of several regional principalities of the medieval state of Kievan Rus'.) in the Ruthenian Uniate Church — a sui juris Eastern Catholic Church in full communion with the Holy See. He reigned from 1674 until his death in 1693.

== Life ==
Kyprian Zochovskyj was born on about 1635 from a noble family in the Polotsk Voivodeship. When young he entered in the monastery of Byten of the Order of Saint Basil the Great. At 23, he went to study in the Greek College in Rome where he studied from March 1658 to August 1664. On 29 April 1663 he was ordained a priest in the Roman Greek Rite church of Sant'Atanasio. After having got the doctorates in theology and metaphysic, he remained in Rome serving in the Greek Rite church of Santi Sergio e Bacco and as secretary of the bishop of Chełm, Jacob Souza, who dwelt in Rome for some years.

Upon returning to his country he was appointed Archimandrite of the monastery in Dubno, and from 1668 Archimandrite of the monastery of Leszczynen. Since 1667 he was at the side of Metropolitan Havryil Kolenda. Zochovskyj proved to be a good administrator: he restored churches and monasteries and he was distinguished for his sermons.

The Metropolitan of Kiev, Havryil Kolenda, chose him as coadjutor bishop with right of succession and with the titular title of Vitebsk and Mstyslav, and so he was confirmed by the king on 12 November 1670. Kolenda consecrated him as bishop on 15 March 1671. His appointment was anyway objected mainly by the bishop of Pinsk, Marcianus Bilozor, who was the nephew of Metropolitan Kolenda and hoped to be himself appointed as successor. Other bishops sided with bishop Bilozor, as bishop Benedict Glynskij of Volodymyr-Brest and even bishop Jacob Souza. They asked Rome to intervene and to make void the appointment of Zochovskyj because of his young age (he was only 35). However, in May 1673 Rome confirmed the Zochovskyj's right of succession. At the death of Kolenda, on 11 February 1674, Zochovskyj became the new Metropolitan of Kiev.

== Metropolitan ==
A parallel metropolis was erected in 1620 — the Metropolis of Kiev, Galicia and all Ruthenia — for those faithful of the Commonwealth who remained loyal to the Ecumenical Patriarchate of Constantinople. Together with the bishop of Chełm, Jacob Souza, he convened in Lublin a synod in 1680 to try to reconcile the Orthodox and the Greek-Catholics, but because of obstruction by the king and by the Nuncio, the debate never took place.

Concerning his Basilian Order, Zochovskyj tried at first to win favour with the monks and so in 1675 he abdicated his right in governing the Order, leaving the General Chapter of the Order to elect as own Proto-Archimandrite (i.e. Superior general) a simple monk. However, years later, on he tried to take the full control on the Order, and so he tried to be elected Proto-Archimandrite in 1683 and in 1684. In both the cases the monks objected and appealed to Rome, that took the side of the monks, cancelling the elections of Zochovskyj as Proto-Archimandrite, and in August 1686 clearly defining the limited power of the Metropolitan in the life of the Order.

Zochovskyj opposed to passage of any faithful of Greek Rite to the Latin rite and he opposed the latinization of his rite, carried on with the Polonization of his country: pleaded by a petition of Zochovskyj, the Pope confirmed the ban of any liturgical latinizated ceremony. In the early 1690s founded in Supraśl a Printing press and thus he stopped the influx of liturgical books from Moscow and he arrested the process of latinization.

He was concerned about improving the education of the clergy and the development of a network of schools: for this aim he restored the seminary in Minsk founded by Metropolitan Rutsky. He donated funds to repair the churches in Vilnius, Navahrudak and Polotsk and he founded a confraternity by the Saint Sophia Cathedral in Polotsk.

Zochovskyj expanded the veneration of the Josaphat Kuntsevych, a Greek-Catholic bishop martyred in 1623 by the Orthodox, and moved his feast day from November 12 to September 26. To support his Church, he obtained that the King of Poland and Grand Duke of Lithuania, Jan Sobieski, confirmed all the rights and privileges of the Greek Catholic Church.

Kyprian Zochovskyj died on 26 October 1693 and was buried in Polotsk.

== Notes ==
Ruthenian Uniate Church titles
Preceded by	Archimandrite of Derman Monastery; 1665 – 1674	Succeeded by
Preceded by Havryil Kolenda	Archbishop of Polotsk; 1674 – 1693	Succeeded by Lev Zalenski (as administrator)
Preceded by Havryil Kolenda	Metropolitan of Kiev, Galicia and all Ruthenia; 1674 – 1693	Succeeded by Lev Zalenski
