= Ruthenian Uniate Church =

Historical precursor of the Ukrainian and Belarusian Greek Catholic Churches

The Ruthenian Uniate Church (Belarusian: Руская уніяцкая царква, romanized: Ruskaja unijackaja carkva; Ukrainian: Руська унійна церква, romanized: Ruśka unijna cerkva; Latin: Ecclesia Ruthena unita; Polish: Ruski Kościół Unicki) was a particular church of the Catholic Church in the territory of the Polish–Lithuanian Commonwealth. It was created in 1595/1596 by those clergy of the Eastern Orthodox Church who subscribed to the Union of Brest. In the process, they switched their allegiances and jurisdiction from the Ecumenical Patriarchate of Constantinople to the Holy See.

The church had a single metropolitan territory — the Metropolis of Kiev, Galicia and all Ruthenia. The formation of the church led to a high degree of confrontation among Ruthenians, such as the murder of Archeparch Josaphat Kuntsevych in 1623. Opponents of the union called church members "Uniates". Catholic documents today no longer use this term due to its perceived negative overtones.

== Background ==
By the time of the Union of Brest, East Slavic-speaking inhabitants of the Polish–Lithuanian Commonwealth and surrounding areans were generally known as Ruthenians. They largely adhered to a Byzantine Rite, whereas most Poles had embraced Roman Catholicism; Lithuanians had largely remained pagan until the late Middle Ages, when their nobility embraced the Latin. The eastward expansion of the Grand Duchy of Lithuania had been facilitated by amicable treaties and inter-marriages of the nobility when faced with the external threat of the Mongol invasion of Kievan Rus'. Ethnically, the Catholics of the Commonwealth were Poles, Germans and Lithuanians.

During the Protestant Reformation of the 16th century, both the Catholic Church in the Commonwealth and the Ruthenian Church underwent a period of decay. The Ruthenian Church was the church of a people without statehood. The Poles considered the Ruthenians as a conquered people. Over time, the Lithuanian military and political ascendancy did away with the Ruthenian autonomies. The disadvantageous political status of the Ruthenian people also affected the status of their church and undermined her capacity for reform and renewal. Furthermore, they could not expect support from the Mother Church in Constantinople or from their co-religionists in Moscow. Thus, the Ruthenian church was in a weaker position than the Catholic Church in the Commonwealth.

=== Decay of the Ruthenian Church in the Commonwealth ===
Both the Catholic and the Ruthenian churches suffered from the policy of nominations to higher benefices by the King, the indifference of the nobility, and a low state of clerical education and discipline. The monarchs used nominations to bishoprics as rewards to faithful civil servants. After Metropolitan Joseph II Soltan (1509–1522), the names of the great families are missing among the nominees to the bishoprics. While the great families could have obtained the nominations had they cared, since they did not, the nominees came from the poorer gentry and from the burghers. Prelates continued to live the style of life they were used to as laymen: they took part in raids and carried on trade and money lending. The Ruthenian Church had no cathedral chapters to make up for the deficiencies of the bishops.

The level of education of the Ruthenian peasantry had been falling during the sixteenth century. This was one of the main reasons for ecclesiastical decay and one of the impediments to renewal. For the common people, their religion was ritualism; attendance was often limited to baptism and church burial.

=== Church of a conquered people ===
Poles regarded Ruthenians as a conquered people. As such, Ruthenians became a second class people in society, their culture backward compared to the other ethnic groups in the Commonwealth. This delayed the church in recovering from the predations of the Reformation. While the Ruthenian nobility had equal rights with the Polish nobility, by the fifteenth century their ranks had been thinned by war and waves of emigration to the east. The Poles who took their place came to control the sejm. If the Ruthenian aristocracy wanted to profit from its equality, it had to become Catholic and Polish. Intermarriage played a great role in the assimilation of the Ruthenian aristocracy; usually the Catholic faith prevailed. As a result, few Orthodox aristocratic families were left in Galicia or Podilia. By the second half of the sixteenth century, Ruthenian nobility had little reason to feel discriminated against. They had kept their wealth, had access to the highest offices, and were socially accepted as equals with the Catholic nobility. By absorbing the Polish form of Western culture, they were also the first to be lost for the Ruthenian people. With the loss of the elite, the Ruthenian Church and people increasingly lost leadership, representation in the government, and benefactors for church-sponsored programmes.

While the Catholic Church in the Commonwealth had successfully resisted the appeal of the Reformation, the Ruthenian church continued to decay. The Ruthenian elite looked externally for aid. The Patriarch in Constantinople could send neither aid nor teachers. Protestant aid was unacceptable to many of them. They therefore turned to the Pope in the hope that he would curb the excesses of the Polish Catholics against Catholic Ruthenians. In this way, they also hoped that acceptance of the Ruthenian hierarchy into Catholic communion would also lead to acceptance of the Ruthenian elite into the political structure of the Commonwealth.

== Ecclesiastical structure ==
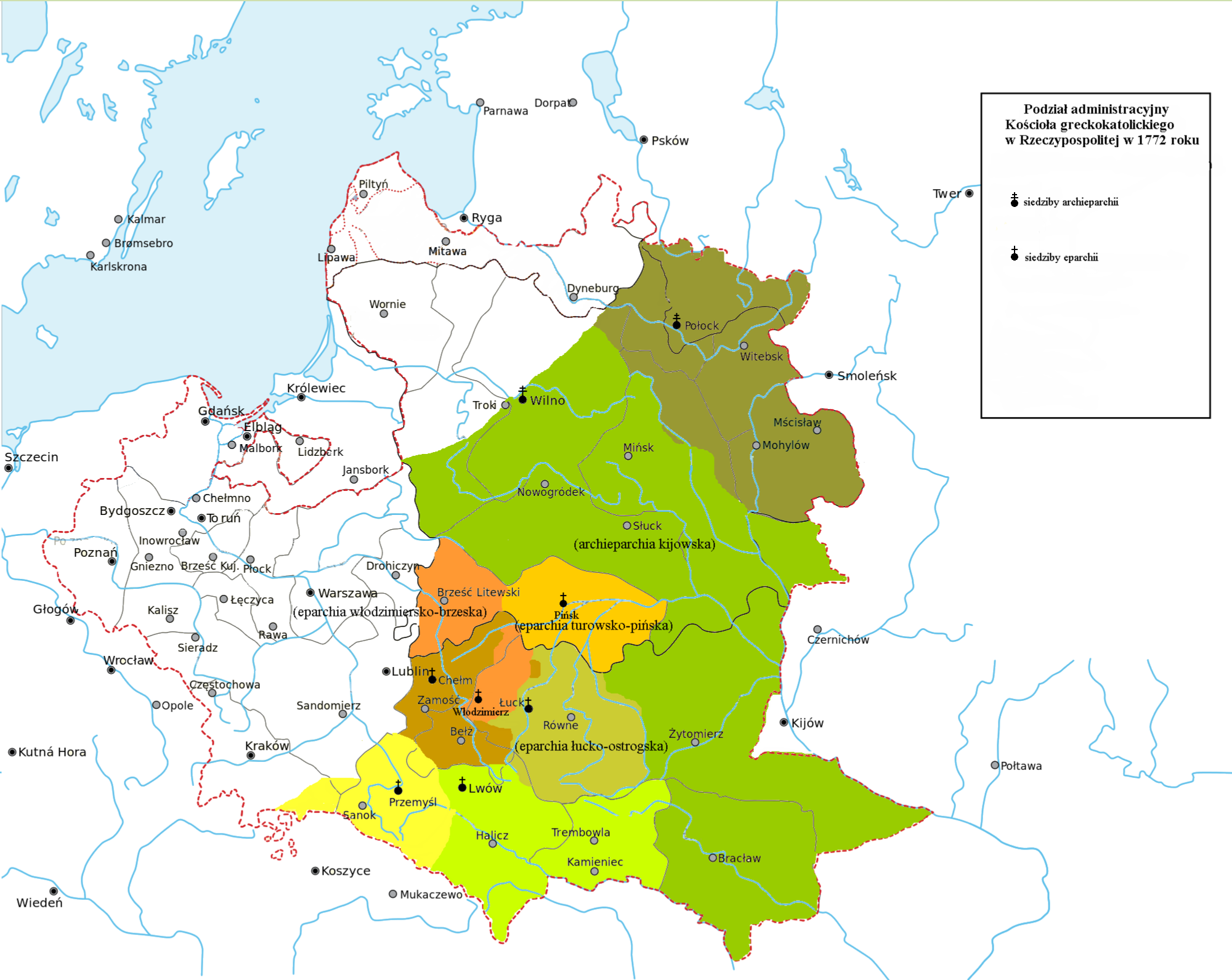
Administrative divisions of the Ruthenian Uniate (Greek-Catholic) Church in 1772 (before the partition of Poland).

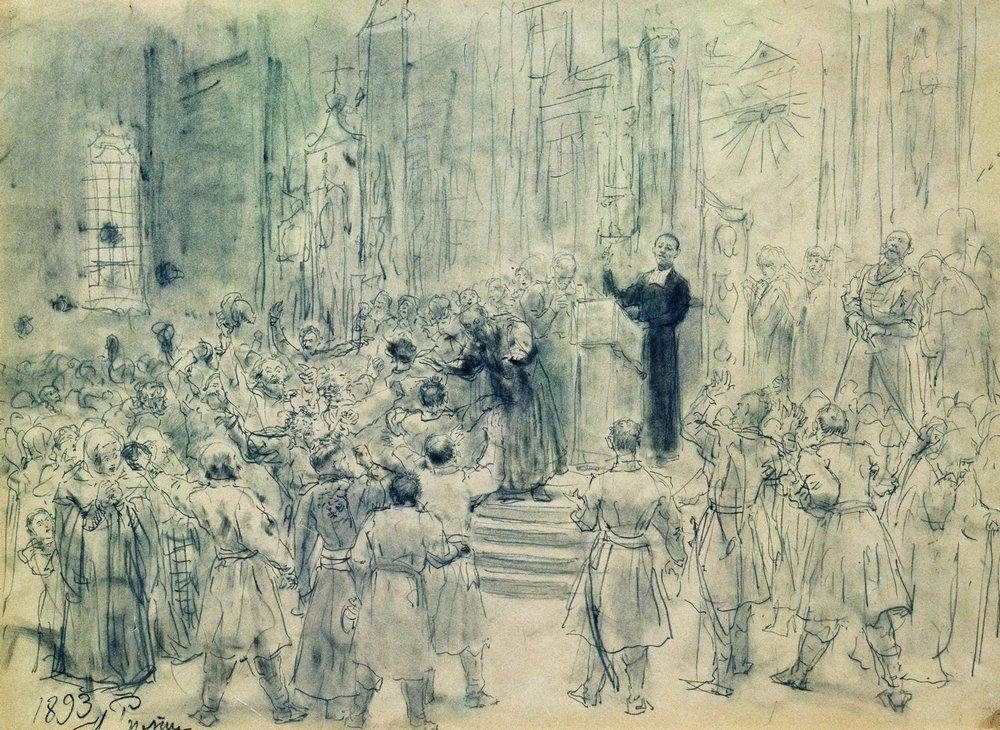
The archbishop Josaphat Kuntsevych encourages inhabitants at Vitebsk, Vitebsk Voivodeship, to join the union. (Note: In 1893, Russian painter Ilya Repin "depicted the moment when a Jesuit encourages residents of Vitebsk join the union," in a drawing on the theme of "preaching Kuntsevych".)

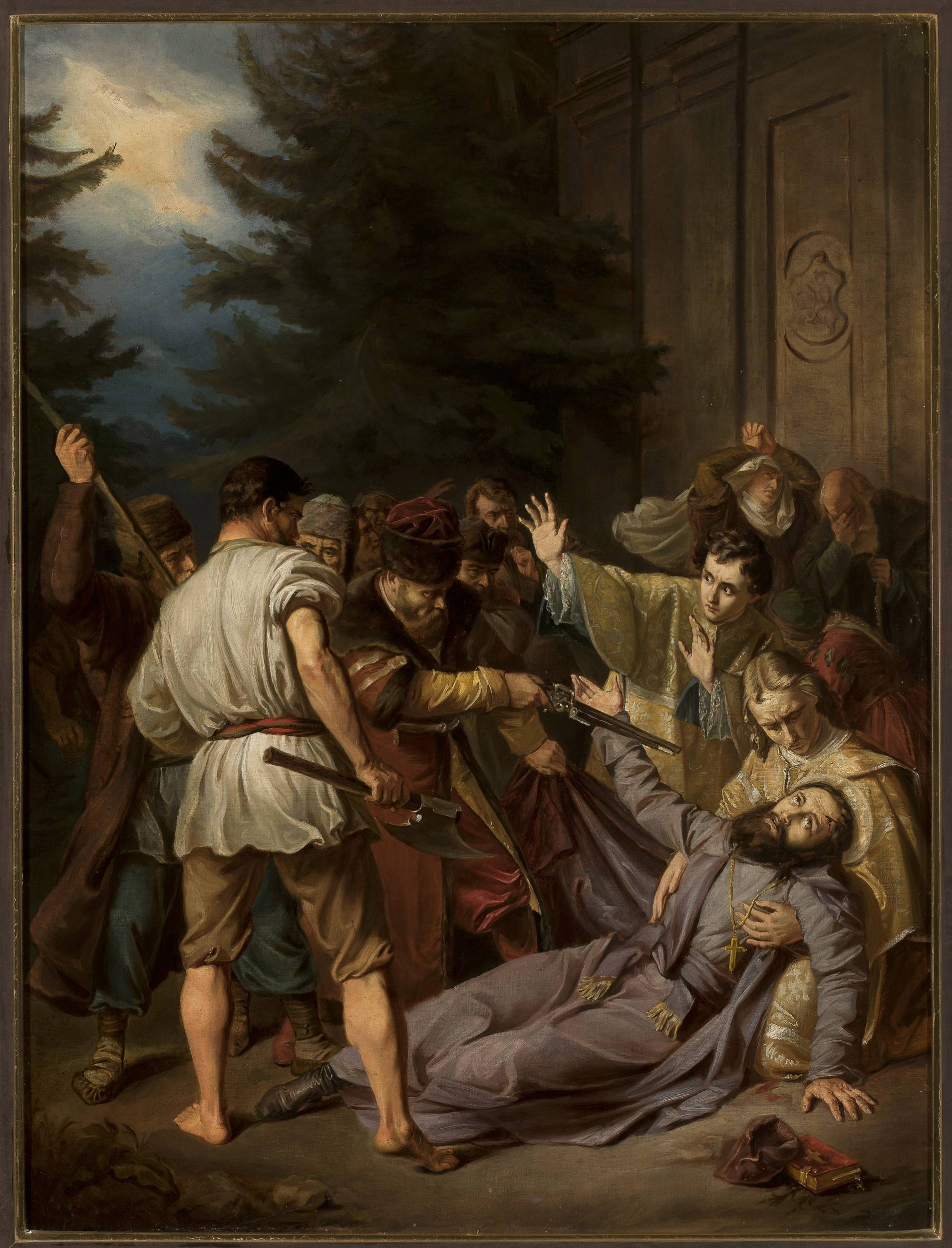
Martyrdom of Vitebsk archbishop Josaphat in 1623 by Polish painter Simmler, 1861.

=== Before the partitions of Poland ===
At the time of the negotiations for union there were eight Ruthenian bishoprics in the Commonwealth: Within the Commonwealth, the metropolis had the following suffragan dioceses and archdioceses (archeparchies):

- Archeparchy of Kiev (Latin: Archieparchia Metropolitana Kioviensis-Haliciensis, located mostly in the modern state of Belarus)
- Archeparchy of Polotsk (located in the modern state of Belarus)
- Archeparchy of Smolensk (erected later; existed 1625–1778)
- Eparchy of Volodymyr and Brest (the bishop also held the title of "Bishop of Volodymyr" in Volhynia)
- Eparchy of Lutsk and Ostroh (1594–1636, 1702–1795, 1789–1839); during the Great Northern War, Volhynia was occupied by Russian troops and the eparchy was converted to Orthodoxy until the withdrawal of troops
- Eparchy of Turov and Pinsk in the region of Polesia
- Eparchy of Lviv
- Eparchy of Chełm
- Eparchy of Przemyśl and Sambir

Carpathian Rus' did not belong to the Commonwealth.

Pope Clement VIII's 1596 bull Decet Romanum Pontificem granted metropolitans the same rights that the Kievan metropolitans had enjoyed under Constantinople. In elections for the office, candidates were chosen by direct vote of the assembled bishops and by the Superior-General (Proto-Archimandrite) of the Basilian order; they were then nominated by the Polish king and confirmed by the pope.

=== After the partitions of Poland ===
Following the partitions, its successor states treated the Uniate Church differently. This is a list of eparchies that followed upon the partitions of the Polish–Lithuanian Commonwealth (1772–1795):

Within the Russian Empire

In the territory annexed by the Russian Empire, the Church was effectively dissolved; most of the eparchies converted to the Russian Orthodox Church. See Synod of Polotsk.

- Archeparchy of Polotsk, Metropolitan of all Byzantine Catholics in Russia
- Eparchy of Brest
- Eparchy of Lutsk
- Eparchy of Lithuania

Within the Kingdom of Prussia

In the territory annexed by the Kingdom of Prussia, the Eparchy of Supraśl operated from 1798 to 1809. Following the Treaties of Tilsit, the territory was annexed by the Russian Empire. As a result, the Church was effectively dissolved and the eparchy was forcibly converted to the Russian Orthodox Church.

- Eparchy of Supraśl (previously part of the Eparchy of Volodymyr-Brest)

Within the Austrian Empire

In the territory annexed by the Austrian Empire, the Church continued to operate. It was reorganized as a Greek Catholic Church — the Metropolis of Kiev, Galicia and all Ruthenia.

- Archeparchy of Lviv, Metropolitan of Galicia
- Eparchy of Chełm
- Eparchy of Przemyśl and Sambir

A similar situation continued in the Second Polish Republic of 1918 to 1939. Suppressed in the Soviet Union from 1946, the Ruthenian Uniate Church survived to become the core of the Ukrainian Greek Catholic Church from 1989. Today, the metropolis is styled the Major Archeparchy of Kyiv–Galicia.

== List of metropolitan bishops ==
=== Metropolitans before the partitions of Poland ===
Metropolitans of Kyiv, Galicia and all Ruthenia:

- 1596—1599 Michael Rohoza (Polish: Michał Rahoza, Belarusian: Міхаіл Рагоза)
- 1600—1613 Hypatius Pociej (Polish: Hipacy Pociej, Belarusian: Іпацій Пацей)
- 1613—1637 Joseph Rutski (Polish: Józef Welamin Rucki, Belarusian: Язэп Руцкі)
- 1637—1640 Raphael Korsak (Polish: Rafał Mikołaj Korsak, Belarusian: Рафаіл Корсак)
- 1641—1655 Antonius Sielawa (Polish: Antoni Sielawa, Belarusian: Антон Сялява)
- 1666—1674 Gabriel Kolenda (Polish: Gabriel Kolenda, Belarusian: Гаўрыла Календа)
- 1674—1693 Cyprian Żochowski (Polish: Cyprian Żochowski, Belarusian: Кіпрыян Жахоўскі)
- 1694—1708 Leo Załęski (Polish: Lew Ślubicz-Załęski, Ukrainian: Лев Слюбич-Заленський)
- 1708—1713 George Winnicki (Polish: Jerzy Winnicki, Ukrainian: Юрій Винницький)
- 1714—1729 Leo Kiszka (Polish: Leon Kiszka, Ukrainian: Лев Кишка)
- 1729—1746 Athanasius Szeptycki
- 1748—1762 Florian Hrebnicki
- 1762—1778 Philip Wołodkowicz
- 1778—1779 Leo Szeptycki
- 1780—1786 Jason Smogorzewski
- 1787—1805 Theodosius Rostocki

=== Post-partition administrators in Russia ===
- Heraclius Lisowski
- Gregory Kochanowicz
- Josaphat Bulhak

== Successor entities ==
There are three successor entities:

- Ukrainian Greek Catholic Church whose primate holds the title of Major archbishop. The incumbent Major archbishop (or metropolitan) of the Metropolis of Kyiv and Halych is Sviatoslav Shevchuk.
- Belarusian Greek Catholic Church
- Russian Greek Catholic Church

=== Development in Ukraine and Belarus ===
Today, the Ruthenian Uniate Church has two ecclesiastical jurisdictions: the Ukrainian Greek Catholic Church and the Belarusian Greek Catholic Church. The Ukrainian jurisdiction operates in the following countries under a metropolitan bishop:

- Poland under the Metropolitan of the Archeparchy of Przemyśl–Warsaw
- the United States under the Metropolitan of the Archeparchy of Philadelphia
- Canada under the Metropolitan of the Archeparchy of Winnipeg
- Brazil under the Metropolitan of the Archeparchy of São João Batista em Curitiba

It operates in the following countries as eparchies under the care of the Major Archbishop :

- Argentina as the Eparchy of Santa María del Patrocinio in Buenos Aires
- Australia, New Zealand and Oceania as the Eparchy of Saints Peter and Paul of Melbourne
- United Kingdom as the Eparchy of the Holy Family of London
- France, Belgium, Luxemburg, the Netherlands and Switzerland as the Eparchy of Saint Vladimir the Great of Paris

It operates in the following countries as an exarchate, directly responsible to the Holy See:

- Germany and Scandinavia as the Apostolic Exarchate of Germany and Scandinavia
- Italy and San Marino as the Apostolic Exarchate of Italy

=== Related ===
- Ruthenian Greek Catholic Church, Byzantine Rite church of Carpathian Ruthenians (better known as Rusyns).
- Uniates of Podlasie in Wohyń
