= Antin Sielava =

Metropolitan of Kiev, Galicia and all Ruthenia (1641–1655)

Anton Sielava
- Metropolitan of Kiev
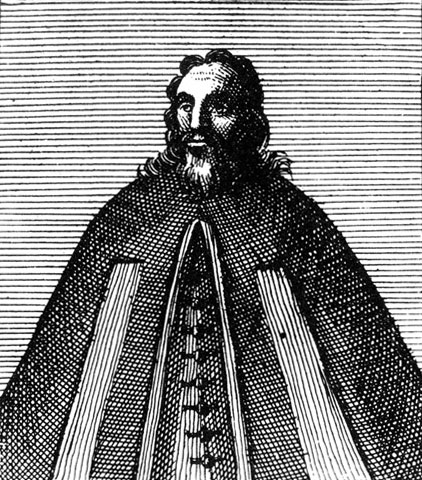
- Church: Ruthenian Uniate Church
- Appointed: 18 March 1641
- Term ended: 5 October 1655
- Predecessor: Rafajil Korsak
- Successor: Havryil Kolenda

Orders
- Ordination: 1617 (Priest)
- Consecration: 1624 (Bishop) by Joseph Rutski

Personal details
- Born: 1583
- Died: 5 October 1655 (aged 71–72)

Anton Anastas Sielava (Belarusian: Антон Анастас Сялява, Ukrainian: Антін Селява, Polish: Antoni Sielawa) (1583 – 5 October 1655) was the "Metropolitan of Kiev, Galicia and all Ruthenia" (Note: The title is also known as the Metropolis of Kiev, Halych and all Rus' or Metropolis of Kyiv, Halychyna, and All-Rus'. The name "Galicia" is a Latinized form of Halych, one of several regional principalities of the medieval state of Kievan Rus'.) in the Ruthenian Uniate Church — a sui juris Eastern Catholic Church in full communion with the Holy See. He reigned from 1641 until his death in 1655.

== Life ==
Anastas Sielava was born on about 1583 in the Polotsk Voivodeship from a family of Cossack origin and belonging to the Orthodox religion. In 1612 he entered in the Order of Saint Basil the Great, in the monastery of the Holy Trinity in Vilnius, taking the religious name of Anton (Antony). He lived for some time in the same cell with Saint Josaphat Kuntsevich and he was ordained a priest in 1617. He studied in the Greek College in Rome from 1617 to September 1619.

On 12 November 1623 the bishop of Polotsk, Josaphat Kuntsevich (later declared a Saint), was killed by an Orthodox mob. After him, Anton Sielava was appointed to the See of Polotsk. He was consecrated a bishop in early 1624 by Metropolitan Joseph Velamin-Rutski and enthroned on 14 February 1624.

To Metropolitan Joseph Rutski succeeded Metropolitan Rafajil Korsak, who, when in 1639 left Belarus to go to Rome for Visit ad Limina, appointed Sielava as Vicarius for the Church. Rafajil Korsak died in Rome in August 1640 and, according to his last will, Pope Urban VIII confirmed Sielava as new Metropolitan after the usual process of eligibility. Anton Sielava was so formally appointed Metropolitan of Kiev on 18 March 1641. His patriarchate was initially marked by the beatification, on 16 May 1643, of Josaphat Kuntsevich.

As with his predecessor, he continued to negotiate with the prelates of the Metropolis of Kiev, Galicia and all Ruthenia who remained loyal to the Ecumenical Patriarchate of Constantinople. In particular, he engaged with Metropolitan Peter Mogila, seeking a way to unify the Church in Ukraine. However, he was not a person of the stamp of his predecessors; after Mogila's death in 1646, the discussions ended without results.

Sielava left much part of the administration of the Church to others, and he was of a sickly disposition and quite hypochondriac, and in the last part of his life he was seriously ill and blind.

Since 1648, the political situation in the Polish–Lithuanian Commonwealth underwent years of crisis due to the Khmelnytsky Uprising, a Cossack rebellion in Ukraine fiercely anti-Catholic, followed by the Russo-Polish War (1654-1667) and Second Northern War. The Greek-Catholic Church was seriously threatened, many churches, monasteries and schools were destroyed, and priests and monks killed. Sielava had to leave Polotsk and died on 5 October 1655, when already (since 1653) the Greek-Catholic Church was in the resolute hands of Gabriel Kolenda.

== Works ==
Anton Sielava was also a writer and a polemist. Among his works we have his "Antelenchus", against the "Elenchum" of Meletius Smotrytski, and his "Vitam Servi Dei Josaphat, Archiepiscopi Polocensis" (Life of the Servant of God Josaphat, bishop of Polotsk) edited in 1624.

== Notes ==
Ruthenian Uniate Church titles
Preceded by Josaphat Kuntsevich	Archbishop of Polotsk; 1624 – 1655	Succeeded by Nikifor Losovski
Preceded by Rafail Korsak	Metropolitan of Kiev, Galicia and all Ruthenia; 1641 – 1655	Succeeded by Havryil Kolenda
