= Josaphat Bulhak =

Metropolitan Josaphat (Bulhak)
- Jozafat Bułhak
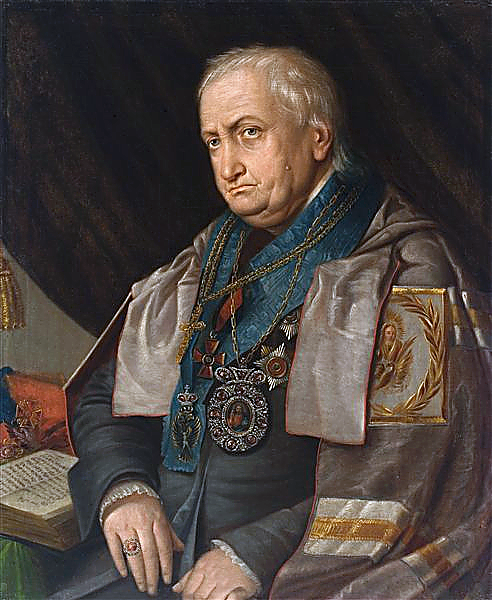
- Josaphat Bulhak
- Title: Metropolitan Bishop

Personal life
- Born: 20 April 1758
- Died: 25 February 1838 (aged 79)
- Known for: Last Metropolitan of Ruthenian Uniate Church

Religious life
- Denomination: Catholic Church
- Church: Ruthenian Uniate Church

Josaphat Bulhak (20 April 1758 – 25 February 1838) was a hierarch of the Ruthenian Uniate Church in the western Russian empire. As head of the church, he had the title of Metropolitan of Kyiv, Galicia, and All Russia. After his death, the Ruthenian Uniate Church was absorbed by the Russian Orthodox Church, making him the last head of the Uniate confession in the Russian empire.

== Biography ==
He was born into Polish nobility near Brest in the Grand Duchy of Lithuania. From 1763 to 1774, he was educated at schools of the Basilian order. In 1774, he entered the order and assumed the name Josaphat. From 1782 to 1784, he got his higher education from the Collegio Urbano in Rome, graduating as a Doctor of Theology. In 1787, he was elevated to the Bishop of Turov. In 1795, after the Second Partition of Poland, he was removed from his seat and the Turov bishopric was closed by the Russian government. After the death of Catherine II and the creation of the Roman Catholic Spiritual College in St. Petersburg, Bulhak was appointed to the Uniate department of the college. In 1817, he was appointed to the Metropolitan seat of Kyiv by Tsar Alexander I, thus becoming a titular head of the Uniate church in the Russian empire. This appointment was made without prior approval from Rome but was approved after the fact. In 1818, he also served as the head of the Uniate department of the Roman Catholic Spiritual College and also Vice President of the Russian Biblical Fellowship.

During the Polish uprising of 1830–1831, Bulhak had to publicly side with the imperial government. His pastoral letters were printed and distributed in rebellious territories. After 1833 he ruled the Archeparchy of Polotsk-Vitebsk, the greatest of the Catholic eparchies in Russia. In the last 10 years of his life, he was surrounded by hierarchs hostile to the independence of the Uniate church, such as Bishop Yosyf Semashko. Though Semashko pushed Bulhak to approve the union of the ruthenian church to the Russian Orthodox Church, Bulhak never joined this project, and the Church was united by the decisions of the Synod of Polotsk after Bulhak's death.
