= Havryil Kolenda =

Metropolitan of Kiev, Galicia and all Ruthenia (1665–1674)

- Metropolitan of Kiev
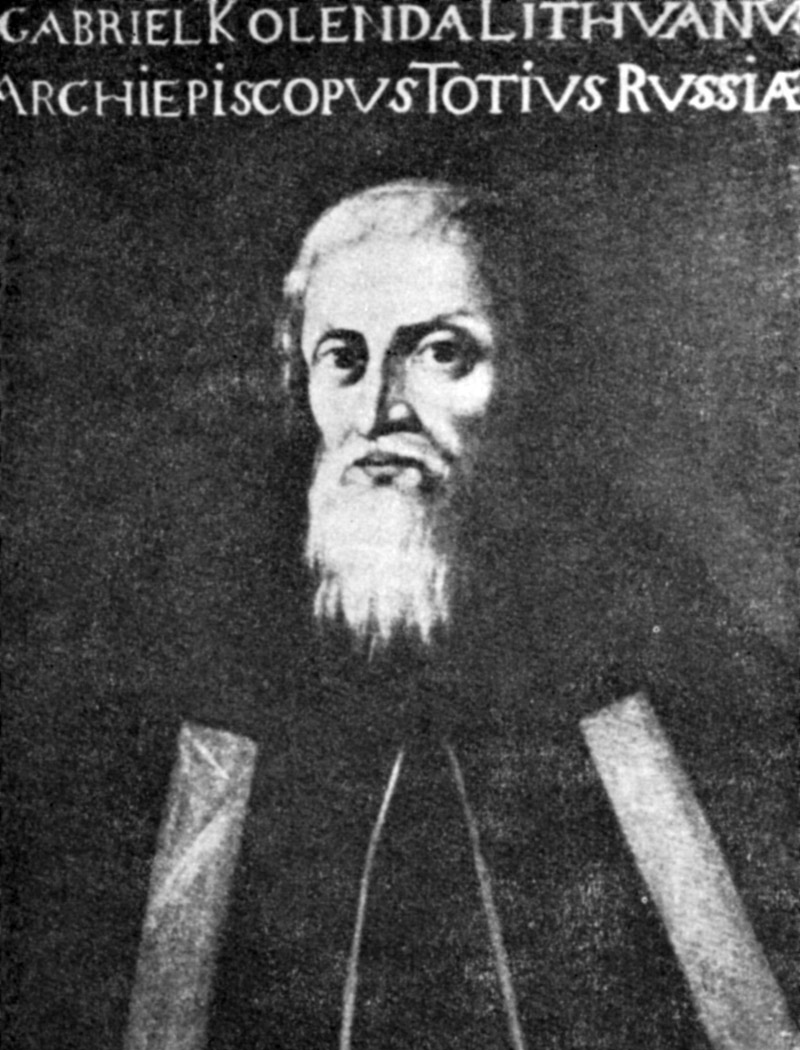
- Church: Ruthenian Uniate Church
- Appointed: 22 April 1665
- Term ended: 11 February 1674
- Predecessor: Antin Sielava
- Successor: Kyprian Zochovskyj

Orders
- Ordination: 28 March 1633 (Priest)
- Consecration: 1652 (Bishop) by Antin Sielava

Personal details
- Born: 1606
- Died: 11 February 1674 (aged 67–68)

Yuri Havryil Kolenda (Ukrainian: Юрій Гавриїл Коленда, Belarusian: Гаўрыла Календа, Polish: Gabriel Kolenda) (1606—1674) was the "Metropolitan of Kiev, Galicia and all Ruthenia" (Note: The title is also known as the Metropolis of Kiev, Halych and all Rus' or Metropolis of Kyiv, Halychyna, and All-Rus'. The name "Galicia" is a Latinized form of Halych, one of several regional principalities of the medieval state of Kievan Rus'.) in the Ruthenian Uniate Church — a sui juris Eastern Catholic Church in full communion with the Holy See. He reigned from 1665 to his death in 1674 having served as administrator of the metropolis from 1655.

== Early life ==
Yuri Kolenda was born about 1606 in the Vilnius Voivodeship. In 1624, he entered in the Order of Saint Basil the Great taking the religious name of Havryil (Gabriel). He passed his novitiate in the monastery of Byten. After the novitiate, in 1627 he was sent to study in Braniewo where he remained till 1630. He returned in Vilnius where he continued his studies, and on 28 March 1633 he was ordained a priest. He later studied in Vienna, and then at the Greek College in Rome from 1 December 1636 to 24 November 1639.

Returning to Lithuania, in 1640 Kolenda became the deputy of the Archbishop of Polotsk, Antin Sielava, who in 1641 became the Metropolitan of Kiev and head of the Church.

== Under the Cossacks wars ==
After 1648, the political situation in the Polish–Lithuanian Commonwealth underwent years of crisis. A parallel metropolis was erected in 1620 — the Metropolis of Kiev, Galicia and all Ruthenia — for those faithful of the Commonwealth who remained loyal to the Ecumenical Patriarchate of Constantinople. The Khmelnytsky Uprising of 1648 posed a threat to the existence of the Commonwealth. One of the targets of the Cossacks was the liquidation of the Greek-Catholic Church, and this request was considered acceptable by the Latin Catholic Poles who, after being defeated by the Cossacks, signed the Treaty of Zboriv in 1649, only the Papal nuncio and Greek-Catholic bishops being opposed. The Cossacks army arrived to forcedly abolish the Greek-Catholic eparchy of Chełm, one of the strongholds of the Greek-Catholic Church. In September 1651, due to a temporary defeat of the Cossacks, the new Treaty of Bila Tserkva was signed and it contained no more statements about the liquidation of the Greek-Catholic Church, which was allowed to reenter Chełm and Przemyśl.

In 1652, Havryil Kolenda was consecrated a bishop with the title of bishop of Mstsislaw by his Metropolitan Antin Sielava. On 23 June 1563 the coadjutor bishop of the Metropolitan, Pachomius Oranski bishop of Pinsk, was killed by the Cossacks, and Kolenda was chosen as new coadjutor with the right of succession.

After a couple of years of truce, in 1654 the Cossacks allied with the Russian tsar in the Treaty of Pereyaslav which led to the Russo-Polish War (1654-1667), besides the Second Northern War (1655–60) with the invasion from Sweden. These wars led to a period of mass murders and poverty known as the Deluge. The Russian army from North, and the Cossacks from South, occupied the territories of the Greek-Catholic Church, and destroyed churches, monasteries, and schools, and killing priests and monks.

On 5 October 1655 the Metropolitan of Kiev, Antin Sielava, died. Kolenda succeeded him as Administrator of the Greek-Catholic Church but not as Metropolitan, because due to the war it was not possible to convene the electoral synod as requested by Rome or to obtain the appointment from the King, who preferred not to displease the powerful Cossacks.

In the meantime the wars went on. Kolenda had to flee Polotsk, bringing with him the relics of Saint Josaphat, and he moved to Supraśl Lavra. The Treaty of Hadiach of 1658 signed between Poland and the Cossacks foresaw again the liquidation of the Greek-Catholic Church. This treaty was however not fully enforced because of successive divisions among the Cossacks.

== Metropolitan ==
The problems for Kolenda's Church in this period came also from the Latin Catholic bishops of Poland, who tried to persuade Rome to terminate the Greek-Catholic Church and to extend their jurisdiction over the Byzantine Rite faithful. To obtain some help for his Church, Kolenda sent in 1644 to Rome the bishop of Chełm, Jacob Souza, who succeeded in convincing the papacy to take a stand for the Ukrainian Greek Catholic Church, reaffirming its independence from the Latin episcopate, obtaining the appointment of Kolenda as Metropolitan, confirming the validity of ordinations made by Orthodox, and ruling about the Basilian Order. Thus on 22 April 1665 Havryil Kolenda was formally appointed as Metropolitan of Kiev.

After the Truce of Andrusovo in 1667 the war ended and the situation of the Ukrainian Greek Catholic Church improved, even if it had to leave the town of Smolensk and the capital Kiev. In 1668, and later in 1669, Kolenda succeeded in obtaining from the King of Poland the decrees for the restitution of the churches and properties seized during the wars. In 1667 Kolenda became the Proto-Archimandrite (i.e. Superior general) of the Basilian Order, ending ten years of disputes about the heading of the order.

Havryil Kolenda died on 11 February 1674 and was buried on 18 February in the Saint Sophia Cathedral in Polotsk.

== Notes ==
Ruthenian Uniate Church titles
Preceded by	Archimandrite of Supraśl Monastery; 1655 – 1674	Succeeded by
Preceded by Nikifor Losovski	Archbishop of Polotsk; 1655 – 1674	Succeeded by Kyprian Zhokhovski
Preceded by Antoniy Sielava	Metropolitan of Kiev, Galicia and all Ruthenia; 1665 – 1674 (locum tenens since 1655)	Succeeded by Kyprian Zhokhovski
