= Joseph Velamin-Rutski =

Metropolitan of Kiev, Galicia and all Ruthenia (1614–1637)

Servant of God Josephus Velamin-Rutski (Язэп Вельямін-Руцкі)
- Metropolitan of Kiev
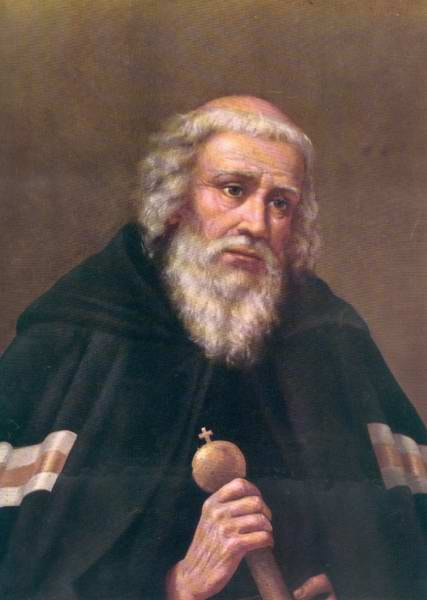
- Church: Ruthenian Uniate Church
- Appointed: 5 April 1614
- Term ended: 5 February 1637
- Predecessor: Hypatius Pociej
- Successor: Raphael Korsak

Orders
- Ordination: 1608 (Priest)
- Consecration: June 1611 (Bishop) by Hypatius Pociej

Personal details
- Born: Jan Rutski; 1574 Ruta in Belarus, Polish–Lithuanian Commonwealth
- Died: 5 February 1637 (aged 62–63) Derman Druha, in Volhynia, Polish–Lithuanian Commonwealth

Joseph Velamin-Rutski (born as Ivan Velyaminov; Belarusian: Язэп Руцкі, Ukrainian: Йосиф Рутський, Polish: Józef Welamin Rucki) - (1574 – 5 April 1637) was the "Metropolitan of Kiev, Galicia and all Ruthenia" (Note: The title is also known as the Metropolis of Kiev, Halych and all Rus' or Metropolis of Kyiv, Halychyna, and All-Rus'. The name "Galicia" is a Latinized form of Halych, one of several regional principalities of the medieval state of Kievan Rus'.) in the Ruthenian Uniate Church — a sui juris Eastern Catholic Church in full communion with the Holy See. He reigned from 1613 to 1637. He worked to build the Greek Catholic Church in the first few decades after the Union of Brest of 1596; he also reformed the Basilian monks.

== Early life ==
Joseph Velyaminov-Rutski (father Feliks Velyaminov from Moscow and mother Bahumila Korsak) lived in Polish–Lithuanian Commonwealth, had Ruthenian origins and was noble and Calvinist. Joseph's father Feliks Velyaminov belonged to the Rurik dynasty; he escaped Russian Tsardom during the reign of Ivan the Terrible. Ivan Velyaminov was born in 1574 and, according to a use of noble families, was named after the estate where he was born, Ruta, thus he was named Ivan Velaminov-Rutski.

At 17 he moved to Prague where he studied under the Jesuits and converted to the Catholic Church of Latin Rite against the will of his parents. From 1593-1596, Rutski studied philosophy at Wurtzburg. After the death of his father, his mother, who remained a Calvinist, opposed Rutski's desire to enter into religious life and stopped supporting his studies. Rutski continued his studies in the St. Athanasius Greek College in Rome, where he was authorized by Pope Clement VIII to change from the Latin Rite to the Byzantine Rite. Rutski completed his studies in 1603.

== Metropolitan of Kiev ==
Rutski was sent to Vilnius by Pope Clement VIII in 1605. He entered the Monastery of the Holy Trinity in 1607 where he took the monastic name Jazep (Joseph). He was then named archimandrite of the monastery and in 1611 he was appointed as the coadjutor bishop of Kiev. He was consecrated as a bishop by Metropolitan Hypatius Pociej in June 1611. Following Pociej's death in 1613, Rutski became Metropolitan Joseph IV of Kiev. He was assisted by Josaphat Kuncevyc, with whom he worked since his time at the Monastery of the Holy Trinity. Upon becoming metropolitan, Rutski consecrated Josaphat as coadjutor Archbishop of Polotsk with the title of Bishop of Vitebsk.

In 1617, Metropolitan Rutski united a number of monasteries into the Congregation of the Holy Trinity of the Order of Saint Basil the Great.

Following the erection of the parallel metropolis in 1620 — the Metropolis of Kiev, Galicia and all Ruthenia — he worked for unity with those bishops who remained loyal to the Ecumenical Patriarchate of Constantinople.

He died on 5 February 1637 and is buried in Vilnius. His cause for beatification began in 1937.

== Notes ==
Ruthenian Uniate Church titles
Preceded by Sophroniy	Archimandrite of Holy Trinity Monastery; 1609 – 1614	Succeeded by Josaphat Kuntsevych
Preceded by Hipatiy Poti	Metropolitan of Kiev, Galicia and all Ruthenia; 1613 – 1637	Succeeded by Rafal Korsak
