= Lev Zalenskyj =

Metropolitan of Kiev, Galicia and all Ruthenia (1695–1708)

Lev Shlubyc Zalenskyj
- Metropolitan of Kiev
- Church: Ukrainian Greek Catholic Church
- Appointed: 16 September 1695
- Term ended: 21 July 1708
- Predecessor: Kyprian Zochovskyj
- Successor: Yurij Vynnyckyj

Orders
- Consecration: 1678 (Bishop) by Kyprian Zochovskyj

Personal details
- Born: about 1648
- Died: 21 July 1708 Volodymyr-Volynskyi

Lev Shlubych Zalenskyj (Ukrainian: Лев Шлюбич-Заленський, Belarusian: Леў Шлюбіч-Заленскі, Polish: Lew Ślubicz-Załęski) (c. 1648–1708) was the "Metropolitan of Kiev, Galicia and all Ruthenia" (Note: The title is also known as the Metropolis of Kiev, Halych and all Rus' or Metropolis of Kyiv, Halychyna, and All-Rus'. The name "Galicia" is a Latinized form of Halych, one of several regional principalities of the medieval state of Kievan Rus'.) in the Ruthenian Uniate Church — a sui juris Eastern Catholic Church in full communion with the Holy See. He reigned from 1694 until his death in 1708.

== Life ==
Lev Shlubych Zalenskyj was born in about 1648 in Lubycz, a village near Lutsk in Volhynia, from a noble family. He entered at a young age the Order of Saint Basil the Great, and after novitiate he was assigned to the Supraśl Lavra. He studied at University of Olomouc and in Vilnius. After ordination to the priesthood, at 25 he went to complete his studies in the Greek College in Rome where he studied metaphysics from December 1673 to May 1676, when he returned in his country and was appointed Archimandrite of the Zhyrovichy Monastery.

The bishop of Volodymyr-Brest, Benedict Glynskij, who was Zalenskyj's uncle by the side of his mother, before he died in 1677, had Zalenskyj elected as coadjutor bishop for his diocese. Zalenskyj received the appointment from King John III Sobieski on 30 November 1678 and shortly later he was consecrated a bishop by Metropolitan Kyprian Zochovskyj. In 1679 Zalenskyj became the titular bishop of Volodymyr-Brest, with the title of Protothronius (first after the Metropolitan).

When in October 1693 the Metropolitan Kyprian Zochovskyj died without a coadjutor, Zalenskyj was chosen to temporarily lead the Church because he was the Protothronius. A few months later, in 1694, the Greek-Catholic bishops met in Warsaw and elected him as new Metropolitan. His election was confirmed by the king and finally by Pope Innocent XII on 16 September 1695.

Zalenskyj was a firm supporter of the Union of Brest, and in the first part of his reign he obtained an enlargement of his Church, with the adhesion to the Union of the Archeparchy of Lviv on 9 June 1700 (the eparch of Lviv, Josyf Sumljanskyj, privately adhered to the Union already some years before). He also succeeded in repairing the relations of the Metropolitan with the Basilian monks which had become strained under his predecessor.

The second part of Zalenskyj's reign was marked by the difficulties of the Great Northern War (started in 1700), and by the persecutions of Peter I of Russia against the Greek Catholic Church, such as the murdering of Basilian monks on 11 July 1705 in Polotsk.

Zalensky died in Volodymyr-Volynskyi on 21 July 1708. At his death the Ukrainian Greek Catholic Church was the main Eastern Rite Church in the Polish–Lithuanian Commonwealth and counted about 12 million adherents.

== Notes ==
Ruthenian Uniate Church titles
Preceded by Venedykt Glinski	Bishop of Wlodziemierz and Bresc; 1679 – 1695	Succeeded by Yuriy Vinnitski (as administrator)
Preceded by Kyprian Zhokhovski	Archbishop of Polock (as administrator); 1693 – 1696	Succeeded by Markian Bilozor
Preceded by Kyprian Zhokhovski	Metropolitan of Kiev, Galicia and all Ruthenia; 1695 – 1708	Succeeded by Yuriy Vinnitski
