= Yulian Pelesh =

Ukrainian Greek Catholic hierarch

- Ukrainian Catholic Eparchy of Przemyśl, Sambir and Sanok
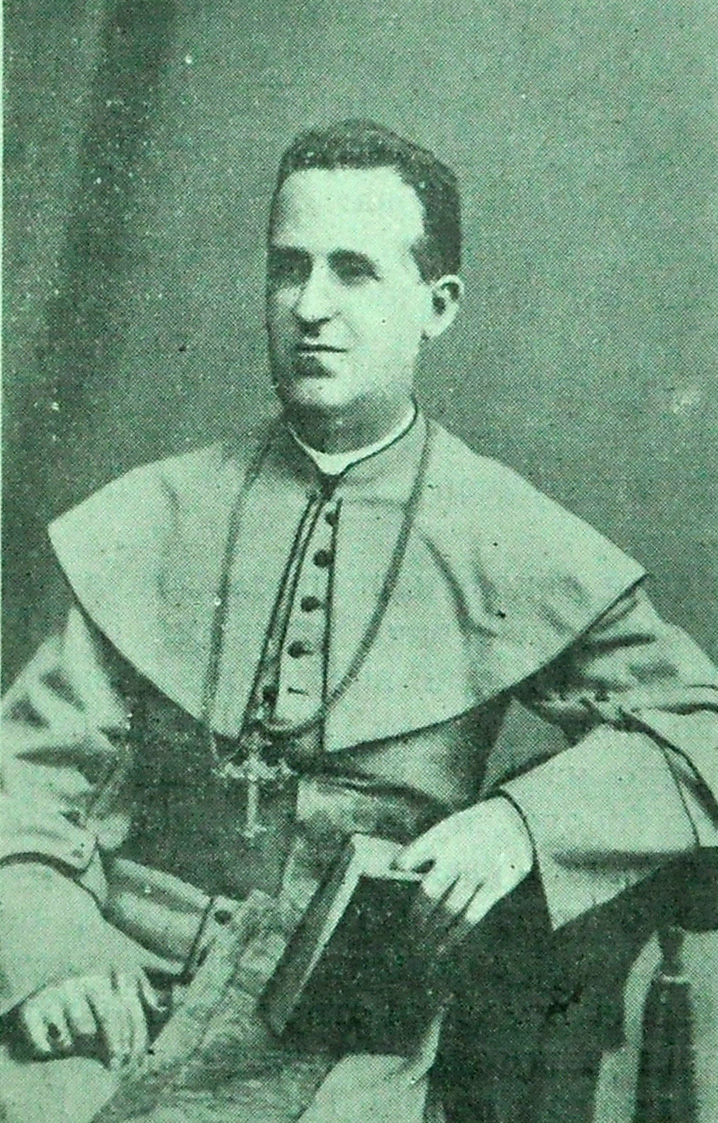
- Church: Ukrainian Greek Catholic Church
- In office: 22 September 1891 – 22 April 1896
- Predecessor: Julian Sas-Kuilovsky, as Ap. Administrator
- Successor: Konstantyn Chekhovych

Orders
- Ordination: 20 October 1867 (Priest) by Toma Polyanskyi
- Consecration: 1 November 1885 (Bishop) by Sylvester Sembratovych

Personal details
- Born: Yulian Pelesh; 3 January 1843 Smerekowiec, Austrian Empire
- Died: 22 April 1896 (aged 53) Przemyśl, Austria-Hungary Empire

Yulian Pelesh (Ukrainian: Юліан Пелеш, Polish: Julian Pełesz; 3 January 1843 – 22 April 1896) was a Ukrainian Greek Catholic hierarch in present-day Ukraine and Poland. He was the first Eparchial Bishop of the new created Ukrainian Catholic Eparchy of Stanislawiw from 1885 to 1891 and the Eparchial Bishop of the Ukrainian Catholic Eparchy of Przemyśl, Sambir and Sanok from 1891 to 1896.

Born in Smerekowiec, Austrian Empire (present day – Lesser Poland Voivodeship, Poland) in the family of cantor-teacher Hryhoriy and his wife Ivanna (née Schavinska) Pelesh in 1843. He was ordained a priest on 20 October 1867 by Bishop Toma Polyanskyi. He served as a prefect in the Theological Seminary in Lviv from 1870 to 1874 and the Rector of the Central Theological Seminary in Vienna from 1875 to 1883.

He was appointed by the Holy See as the first Eparchial Bishop of Ukrainian Catholic Eparchy of Stanislawiw on 27 March 1885 and later transferred as Eparchial Bishop of the Ukrainian Catholic Eparchy of Przemyśl, Sambir and Sanok on 22 September 1891. He was consecrated to the Episcopate on 1 November 1885. The principal consecrator was Metropolitan Sylvester Sembratovych with 2 another co-consecrators.

Bishop Pelesh was the author of monumental Geschichte der Union der ruthenischen Kirche mit Rom (1878-1880) and he died in Przemyśl on 22 April 1896.

Catholic Church titles
New title	Bishop of Stanislau; 1885–1891	Succeeded by Julian Sas-Kuilovsky
Preceded by Julian Sas-Kuilovsky, as Ap. Administrator	Bishop of Premissel and Saanig; 1891–1896	Succeeded by Konstantyn Chekhovych
