= Yosyf Milyan =

Ukrainian Greek Catholic bishop

- Auxiliary of Kyiv Archeparchy
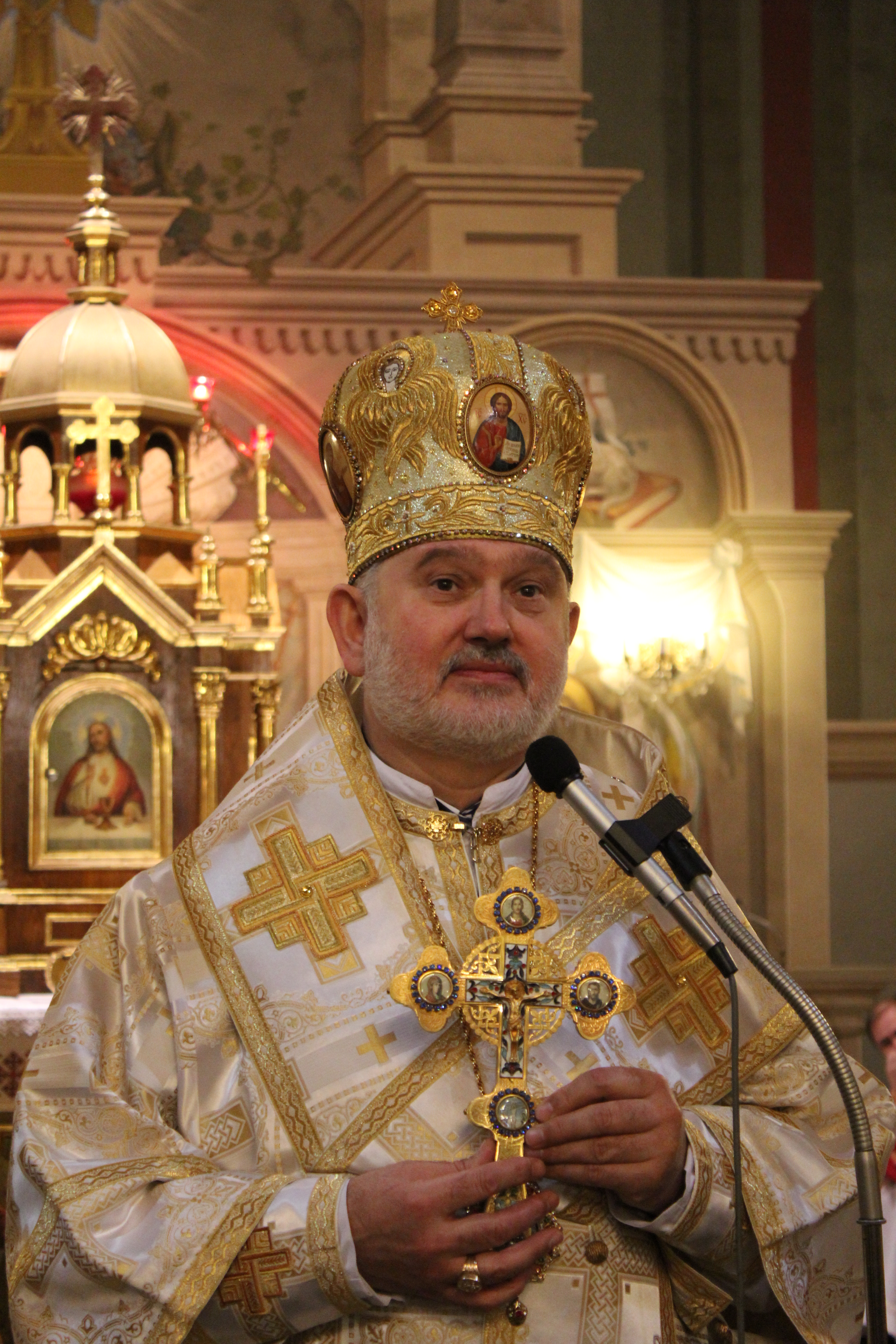
- Church: Ukrainian Greek Catholic
- In office: 18 June 2009 —

Orders
- Ordination: 30 December 1984 (Priest) by Volodymyr Sterniuk
- Consecration: 18 June 2009 (Bishop) by Jan Martyniak

Personal details
- Born: Ivan Milyan; 6 July 1956 (age 69) Dobryany, Lviv Oblast, Ukrainian SSR
- Motto: З нами Бог
- Coat of arms

Yosyf Milyan, MSU (also Romanized as Josyf Milan, Ukrainian: Йосиф Мілян; born 6 July 1956) is the titular bishop of Drusiliana and the auxiliary bishop of the Archeparchy of Kyiv of the Ukrainian Greek Catholic Church.

== Biography ==
Milyan was born in Dobryany in Lviv Oblast. He had clandestinely, because of Communist persecution, had monastic vows in the Univ Lavra on 8 March 1983 and was ordained as hieromonk on 30 December 1984 by metropolitan Volodymyr Sterniuk. He served in the different Ukrainian Studite monasteries in Ukraine until 1997 and from 1997 until 2008 was the head of the youth ministry commission of the UGCC. In 2008 he was transferred to Kyiv and appointed the superior of the Annunciation chapel at the Cathedral of the Resurrection of Christ.

On 16 April 2009, he was confirmed by Pope Benedict XVI as an Auxiliary Bishop of the Ukrainian Catholic Archeparchy of Kyiv and appointed as a Titular Bishop of Drusiliana. He was consecrated as a bishop by Metropolitan Jan Martyniak and co-consecrators: bishop Yulian Voronovskyi and bishop Peter Stasiuk in the Cathedral of the Resurrection of Christ in Kyiv on 18 June 2009.

Styles of Yosyf Milyan
- Reference style: His Eminence
- Spoken style: Your Eminence
