= Kostyantyn Chekhovych =

Ukrainian Greek Catholic hierarch

- Ukrainian Catholic Eparchy of Przemyśl, Sambir and Sanok
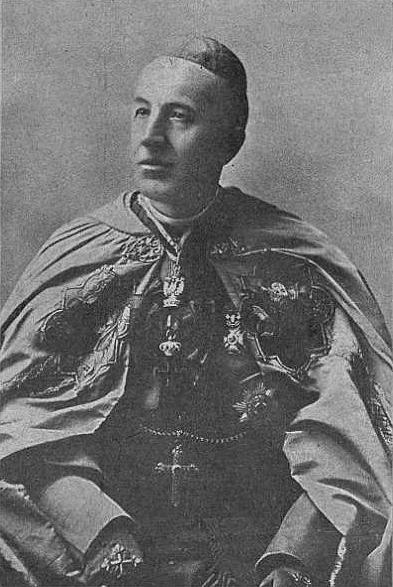
- Church: Ukrainian Greek Catholic Church
- In office: 21 February 1897 – 28 April 1915
- Predecessor: Yulian Pelesh
- Successor: Blessed Josaphat Kotsylovsky

Orders
- Ordination: 5 January 1873 (Priest) by Ivan Stupnytskyi
- Consecration: 21 February 1897 (Bishop) by Sylvester Sembratovych

Personal details
- Born: Kostyantyn Chekhovych; 3 January 1847 Devyatyr, Austrian Empire
- Died: 28 April 1915 (aged 68) Przemyśl, Austria-Hungary Empire

Kostyantyn Chekhovych (Ukrainian: Костянтин Чехович, Polish: Konstanty Czechowicz; 3 January 1847 – 28 April 1915) was a Ukrainian Greek Catholic hierarch in present-day Ukraine and Poland. He was the Eparchial Bishop of the Ukrainian Catholic Eparchy of Przemyśl, Sambir and Sanok from 1896 to 1915.

Born in Devyatyr, Austrian Empire (present day – Lviv Oblast, Ukraine) in the family of Ukrainian Greek-Catholic priest Yosyf and his wife Antonina (née Paslavska) in 1847. He was ordained a priest on 5 January 1873 by Bishop Ivan Stupnytskyi as married priest, but in the same 1873 his wife Mariya (née Sinkevych) died. He worked as the Rector of the Greek-Catholic Theological Seminary in Przemyśl from 1888 to 1890.

He was appointed by the Holy See as an Eparchial Bishop of the Ukrainian Catholic Eparchy of Przemyśl, Sambir and Sanok on 17 November 1896. He was consecrated to the Episcopate on 21 February 1897. The principal consecrator was Metropolitan Sylvester Sembratovych with four another co-consecrators.

He died in Russian captivity during World War I in Przemyśl on 28 April 1915.

Catholic Church titles
Preceded by Yulian Pelesh	Ukrainian Catholic Eparchy of Przemyśl, Sambir and Sanok; 1896–1915	Succeeded by Blessed Josaphat Kotsylovsky
