= Philipp Maizerov =

Abbot Philip Mizer, OSBM (1965 - 2021) was a Russian priest of the Ukrainian Greek Catholic Church and rector of the Russian Catholic of the Byzantine Rite monastic community in the Sargatskoe village.

== Biography ==
Born into a family of Old Believers, Philip Mizer was baptized at age 14 at the White Church, near Kiev. On the 9th grade he was secretly attend services in Murmansk. After high school, he entered in the medical school. Mizer inspired on the example of Archbishop Luke (war-Yasenetsky), who combined to serve God with the service of the people. However, six months before the end of the school Mizer was seen in church at Easter, followed by exclusion from the Young Communist League, which meant the inability to go to college. With the blessing of Bishop Isidore he entered in the Pskov-Caves Monastery, where he was obedient to the economic court, kitchen and prosforne. Privately, he was tonsured a monk by an Archimandrite of the ROCOR, however, the bishop was against plans to become a monk and he was forced to move to another diocese where another bishop tonsured him into a small monastic name of Philip - in honor of Saint Philip Metropolitan of Moscow, and ordained him.

== Joining to the Catholic Church ==
After reading the works of Saint Basil the Great, John Chrysostom, Theodore of Studios, Cyril of Alexandria, Ephrem the Syrian and John of Damascus, Philip Mizer was convinced that the Lord laid the foundation stone of His Church to the Apostle Saint Peter, and came to the conclusion that it is impossible to be in the universal Church and at the same time not be in communion with the Successor of Peter - the Pope. Mizer was the prior of the Trifonov-Pechenga Monastery in the village of Pechenga, Murmansk Oblast. In April 1999 after it became aware of his passionate desire to join to the Catholic Church, he was charged with sodomy and deposed of his rank. Philip Mizer has made three attempts to join to the Catholic Church. For the first time in 1992 in Vilnius, he was refused on the grounds because he was Russian. After the schism between the Moscow Patriarchate and the Constantinople in 1995, Father Philip again tried to join the Catholic Church, however, the archbishop in Moscow refused him, saying that he feared the reaction of the Moscow Patriarchate. Nuncio in Russia advised him to find a bishop who would join him in a different country. In 1999 Father Philip Mizer with Alypy Medvedev, OSBM, was finally converted to the Catholic Church in Poland, by Jan Martyniak. Ukrainian Catholic Archeparchy of Przemyśl – Warszawa. After his conversion Philip Mizer was in Russicum, returned to Russia in 2004 and settled in the Sargatskoe village.
