= Polyanskyi =

Polyanskyi or Polyanskyy (Ukrainian: Полянський) is a Ukrainian surname. Notable people with the surname include:

- Oleksiy Polyanskyi (born 1986), Ukrainian footballer
- Toma Polyanskyi (1796–1869), Ukrainian politician
- Vitaliy Polyanskyi (born 1988), Ukrainian footballer
- Vitaliy Polyanskyy (judoka) (born 1981), Ukrainian judoka
