= Ivan Choma =

Ukrainian Greek Catholic hierarch and ecclesiastical historian

Bishop Ivan Choma
- Titular Bishop of Patara
- Church: Ukrainian Greek Catholic Church
- Other post: Rector of the Ukrainian Catholic University in Rome (1985–2001)

Orders
- Ordination: 29 June 1949 (Priest) by Ivan Buchko
- Consecration: 2 April 1977 (Bishop) by Josyf Slipyj

Personal details
- Born: Ivan Osypovych Choma; 27 November 1923 Khyriv, Second Polish Republic (present day in Lviv Oblast, Ukraine)
- Died: 3 February 2006 (aged 82) Rome, Italy

Ivan Choma or Khoma (Ukrainian: Іван Хома; 27 November 1923 – 3 February 2006) was a Ukrainian Greek Catholic hierarch and ecclesiastical historian in Italy. He was the titular bishop of Patara and from 22 February 1996 until his death on 3 February 2006 and the Procurator of the Head of the Ukrainian Greek-Catholic Church to the Holy See.

== Biography ==
He was born in Khyriv (present day – in Lviv Oblast, Ukraine) to the Ukrainian Greek-Catholic family of Osyp, a railway worker, and Kateryna Choma in 1923. After graduation from the male gymnasia in Sambir and Przemyśl, he joined the theological seminary in Przemyśl, but was forced to interrupt his studies because the Second World War. After the war, he continued in the theological seminary in Prešov (present day Slovakia). In 1946, he emigrated to Italy and graduated from Pontifical Urbaniana University. He was ordained as a priest on 29 June 1949 by Bishop Ivan Buchko for the Eparchy of Przemyśl, Sambir and Sanok. He completed his theological studies with Doctor of Theology degree in 1951.

Choma worked as a second personal assistant for Archbishop Buchko and, from 1963, as the secretary of Cardinal Josyf Slipyj. He was an editor-in-chief of the principal Ukrainian scientific-theological magazine, Bohosloviye (1960–1997).

He was consecrated to the episcopate on 2 April 1977 in the Castel Gandolfo chapel by Major Archbishop Slipyj without papal permission (apostolic mandate) in an act which caused many irritations in the Roman Curia, He was recognised as a bishop by the Holy See and appointed as the Titular Bishop of Patara on 22 February 1996.

He died in Rome on 3 February 2006.

Catholic Church titles
Preceded by Volodymyr Sterniuk (titular)	Titular Bishop of Przemyśl, Sambir and Sanok; 1977–1991	Succeeded by Jan Martyniak
Preceded by Vincenzo Maria Jacono	Titular Bishop of Patara; 1996–2006	Succeeded by Jaime Spengler
New title	Procurator of the Head of the Ukrainian Greek-Catholic Church to the Holy See; 1996–2003	Succeeded by Hlib Lonchyna
Preceded by Josyf Slipyj	Rector of the Ukrainian Catholic University in Rome; 1985–2001	Succeeded by transferred to Ukraine
