= Ivan Bokhenskyi =

- Titular bishop of Rhosus; Ukrainian Catholic Archeparchy of Lviv (auxiliary)
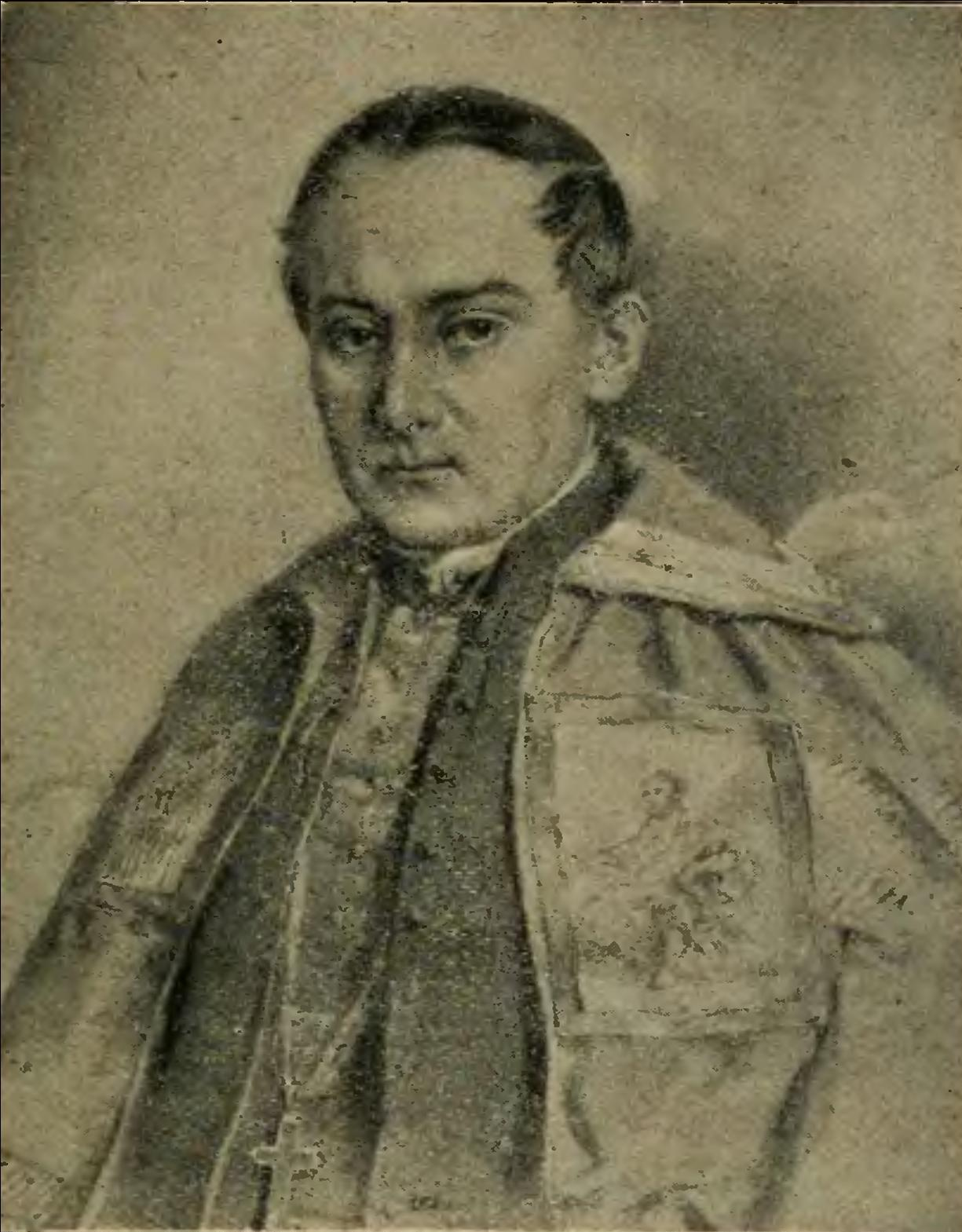
- Church: Ukrainian Greek Catholic Church
- Other post: Rector of the Theological Seminary in Lviv (1841–1850)

Orders
- Ordination: 1815 (Priest)
- Consecration: 13 October 1850 (Bishop) by Hryhoriy Yakhymovych

Personal details
- Born: Ivan Bokhenskyi; 1783 Habsburg monarchy
- Died: 25 January 1857 (aged 74) Lviv, Austrian Empire

Ivan Bokhenskyi (Ukrainian: Іван Бохенський, Polish: Jan Bocheński; 1783 – 25 January 1857) was a Ukrainian Greek Catholic hierarch. He was the Titular bishop of Rhosus and auxiliary bishop of Ukrainian Catholic Archeparchy of Lviv from 1850 to 1857.

== Life ==
Born in Habsburg monarchy (present day – Western Ukraine) in 1783. He was ordained a priest in 1815. He was a professor of dogmatical theology in the Theological Seminary in Lviv, and from 1841 until 1850 served as a Rector of this Seminary.

He was confirmed by the Holy See as an Auxiliary Bishop of the Ukrainian Catholic Archeparchy of Lviv on 20 May 1850. Fr. Bokhenskyi was consecrated to the Episcopate on 13 October 1850. The principal consecrator was Bishop Hryhoriy Yakhymovych with Latin Rite prelate Franciszek Ksawery Wierzchleyski as co-consecrator. He was buried at the Horodok Cemetery in Lviv, and in 1880 may have been reburied at the Lychakiv Cemetery in the tomb of Greek Catholic bishops and wingmen, although his name is not on the tablet on the tomb.

He died in Lviv on 25 January 1857.
