= Ivan Snihurskyi =

Ukrainian Greek Catholic hierarch

- Ukrainian Catholic Eparchy of Przemyśl, Sambir and Sanok
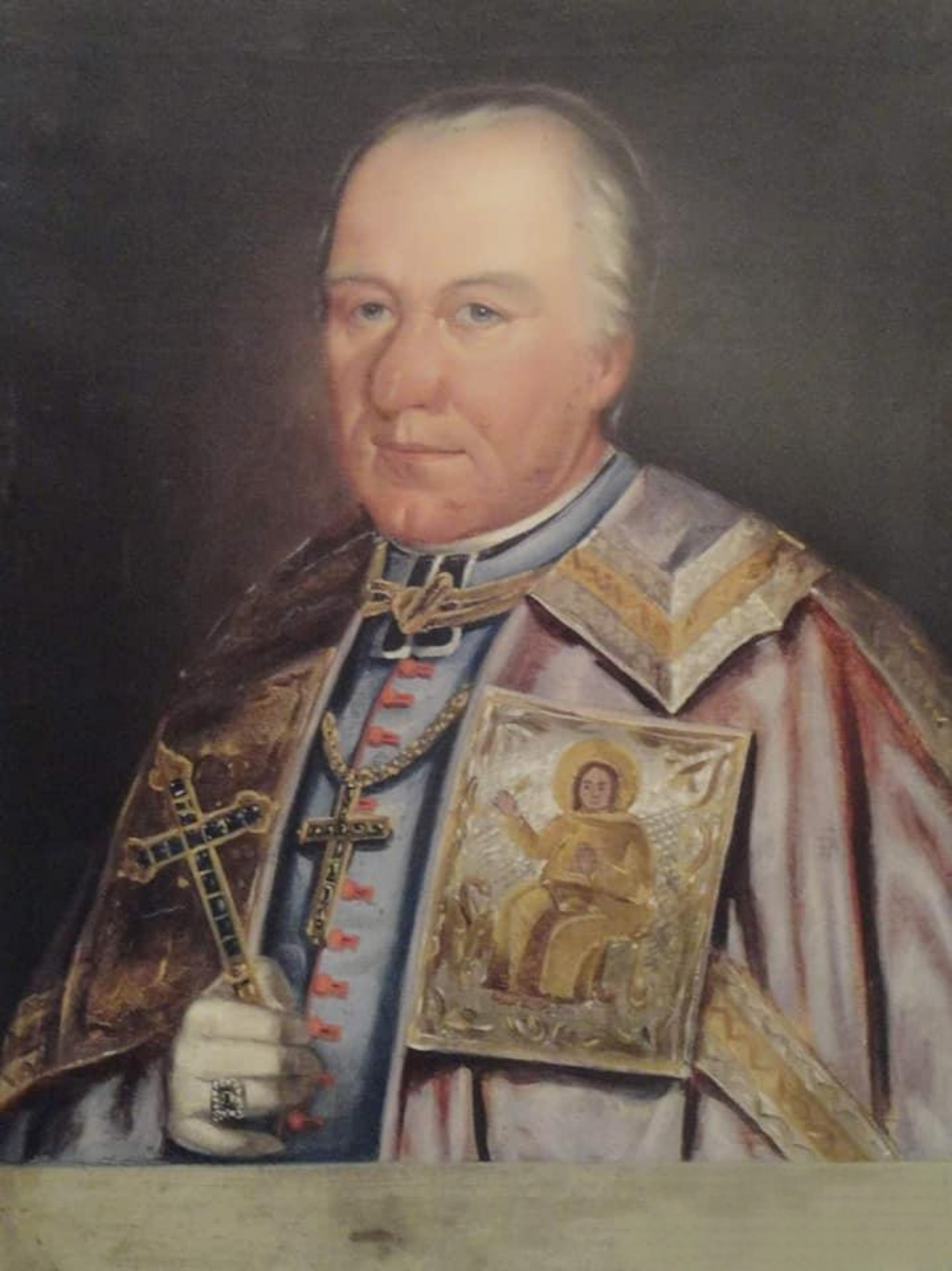
- Ivan Snihurskyi
- Church: Ukrainian Greek Catholic Church
- In office: 30 August 1818 – 24 August 1847
- Predecessor: Mykhajlo Levitsky
- Successor: Hryhoriy Yakhymovych

Orders
- Ordination: 15 March 1807 (Priest) by Antin Angelovych
- Consecration: 30 August 1818 (Bishop) by Mykhajlo Levitsky

Personal details
- Born: Ivan Snihurskyi; 18 May 1784 Berestyany, Habsburg monarchy
- Died: 24 August 1847 (aged 63) Przemyśl, Austrian Empire

Ivan Snihurskyi (Ukrainian: Іван Снігурський, Polish: Jan Snigurski; 18 May 1784 – 24 September 1847) was a Ukrainian Greek Catholic hierarch in a present-day Ukraine and Poland. He was the Eparchial Bishop of the Ukrainian Catholic Eparchy of Przemyśl, Sambir and Sanok from 1818 to 1847.

Born in Berestyany, Habsburg monarchy (present day – Lviv Oblast, Ukraine) in the family of Ukrainian Greek-Catholic priest in 1784. He was ordained a priest on 15 March 1807 by Bishop Antin Angelovych. He worked as a parish priest in the Ruthenian St. Barbara's church in Vienna from 1813 to 1818.

He was confirmed by the Holy See as an Eparchial Bishop of the Ukrainian Catholic Eparchy of Przemyśl, Sambir and Sanok on 30 March 1818. He was consecrated to the Episcopate on 30 August 1818. The principal consecrator was Metropolitan Mykhajlo Levitsky.

He died in Przemyśl on 24 September 1847.

Catholic Church titles
| Preceded by Mykhajlo Levitsky | Ukrainian Catholic Eparchy of Przemyśl, Sambir and Sanok; 1818–1847 | Succeeded by Hryhoriy Yakhymovych |
