= Hryniv =

Rural locality in Lviv Oblast, Ukraine

Hryniv Гринів
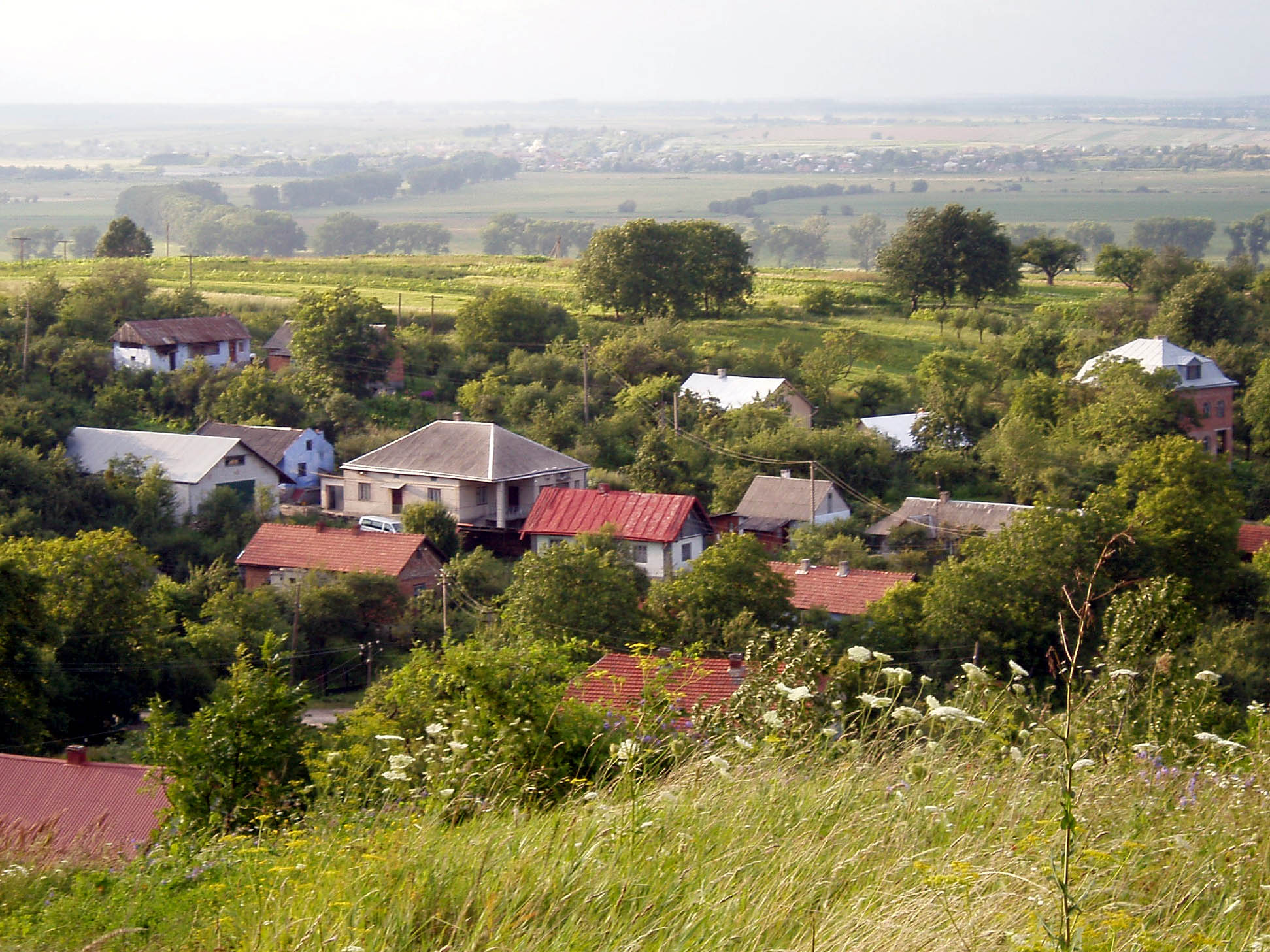
- The village of Hryniv, Pustomyty district.

- Location in Lviv Oblast Hryniv (Ukraine)
- Coordinates: 49°41′44″N 24°16′17″E
- Country: Ukraine
- Oblast: Lviv Oblast
- Raion: Lviv Raion
- Hromada: Davydiv rural hromada
- Time zone: UTC+2 (EET)
  - Summer (DST): UTC+3 (EEST)
- Postal code: 81156

Hryniv (Ukrainian: Гринів, Polish: Hryniów) is a village in the Davydiv rural hromada of the Lviv Raion of Lviv Oblast in Ukraine.

== History ==
At the end of the 19th century, the village was located in the Bóbrka County of the Kingdom of Galicia and Lodomeria. It was home to a Greek Catholic Church parish church and a branch school.

At the beginning of the 20th century, there was a manorial estate in Hryniów.

During the interwar period, Hryniów was part of the Bóbrka County in the Lwów Voivodeship of the Second Polish Republic. According to the 1921 census, the municipality of Hryniów had 174 houses and was inhabited by 924 people: 455 men and 469 women. In terms of religion, 809 residents were Ukrainian Greek Catholic Church, 76 were Roman Catholic, and 39 were Jewish. In terms of nationality, 123 people declared themselves Polish, while 801 declared themselves Ruthenian. In 1934, under the consolidation law, the municipality of Hryniów was incorporated into the Podhorodyszcze municipality. Local Roman Catholics belonged to the parish in Stare Sioło of the Lviv Archdiocese.

After World War II, the village became part of the Soviet Union and, since 1991, has been part of Ukraine. Until 2020, it was located in the Pustomyty Raion within the Zvenyhorodka rural council.

On 19 July 2020, as a result of the administrative-territorial reform and liquidation of the Pustomyty Raion, the village became part of the Lviv Raion.

== Religion ==
- Saint George church (1781, wooden)

== Notable residents ==
- Antin Anhelovych (1756–1814), first Metropolitan Archbishop of the re-built Metropolitan of Lviv (1808–1814)

== Bibliography ==
- "Hryniów". Geographical Dictionary of the Kingdom of Poland (in Polish). 3. Warszawa: Kasa im. Józefa Mianowskiego. 1882. p. 194.
