= Michael Levytsky =

Head of the Ukrainian Greek Catholic Church from 1816 to 1858

His Eminence Michael Levytskyi
- Metropolitan of Galicia, Archbishop of Lemberg
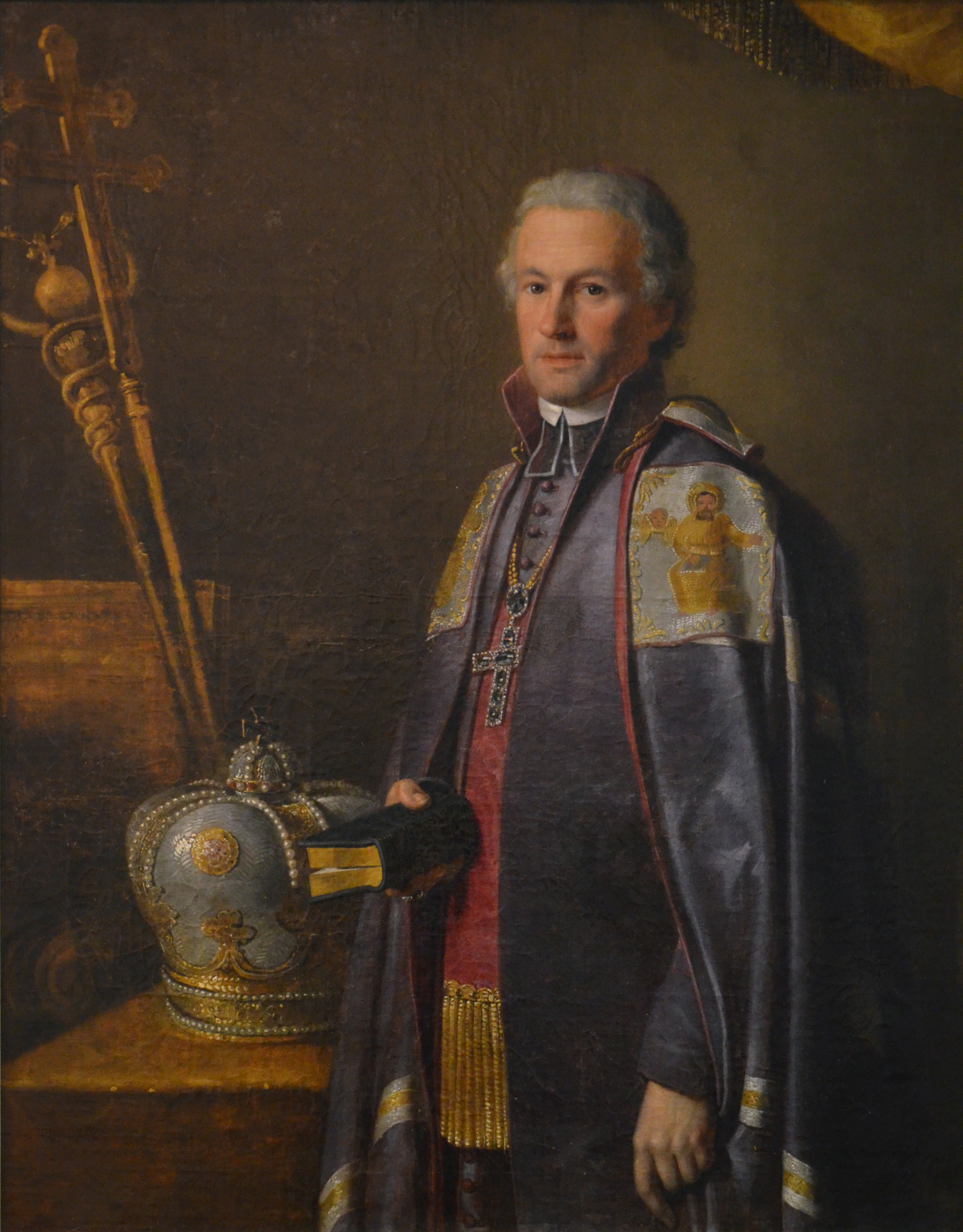
- Church: Ukrainian Greek Catholic Church
- Appointed: 8 March 1816
- Term ended: 14 January 1858
- Predecessor: Antin Angelovych
- Successor: Hryhory Yakhymovych

Orders
- Ordination: 1798 (Priest)
- Consecration: 20 Sept 1813 (Bishop) by Antin Angelovych
- Created cardinal: 16 June 1856

Personal details
- Born: 17 February 1774 Lanchyn, Kingdom of Galicia and Lodomeria, Habsburg monarchy
- Died: 14 January 1858 (aged 83) Univ Lavra, Kingdom of Galicia and Lodomeria, Austrian Empire

Styles of Mykhailo Levytskyi
- Reference style: His Eminence
- Spoken style: Your Eminence
- Informal style: Cardinal
- See: Kyiv and Halych

Michael Levytsky (or Levytskyi or Levitsky (Ukrainian: Михайло Левицький, Polish: Michał Lewicki)); 17 February, 1774 – 14 January, 1858) was the Metropolitan Archbishop of the Ukrainian Greek Catholic Church from 1816 until his death in 1858 and a Cardinal of the Catholic Church. He was from a Ukrainian Greek Catholic sacerdotal family.

== Life ==
Mykhailo Levytskyi was born on 17 February 1774 at Lanchyn, in Pokuttya region, the son of Rev. Stefan Lewicki (sic), the Greek Catholic priest in Lanchyn and Maria (last name unknown). He was one of at least eight children born to Rev. Stefan and Maria. Mykhailo's older brother, Gregory, became a priest also and served the village of Prysowce (Ukr: Prysivtsi) as its Greek Catholic pastor. Mykhailo studied philosophy and theology in Lviv and later in Vienna where, after his (Priestly) ordination in 1798, he entered in force to the Greek Catholic parish of the St. Barbara and where he got a doctorate in theology. Returned to Galicia, became prefect of the Lviv Theological Seminary and later Professor of Scripture and Pastoral Theology at the University of Lviv.

In 1813, he was appointed bishop of Przemyśl and so consecrated Bishop on 20 September 1813 by Metropolitan Antin Angelovych. He participated in the Congress of Vienna.

On 17 August 1815, Mykhailo Levytskyi was designated Metropolitan of Lviv by Emperor Francis II of Austria and so confirmed by Pope Pius VII on 8 March 1816.

He founded 383 parochial schools, cared for the publication of textbooks for them, and he supported the creation of educational associations of priests. Together with John Mohylnytskym he sought the introduction of teaching in the Ukrainian language in schools in Eastern Galicia. Later defined as conservative, he was close to the Polish gentry circles, and enemy of modern trends in social and cultural life. During the revolution of 1848, he supported the creation of the Supreme Ruthenian Council, which supported the Ukrainophile and pro-Habsburg positions of the Western Ukrainian Clergy, and encouraged the clergy to work on the education of the people.

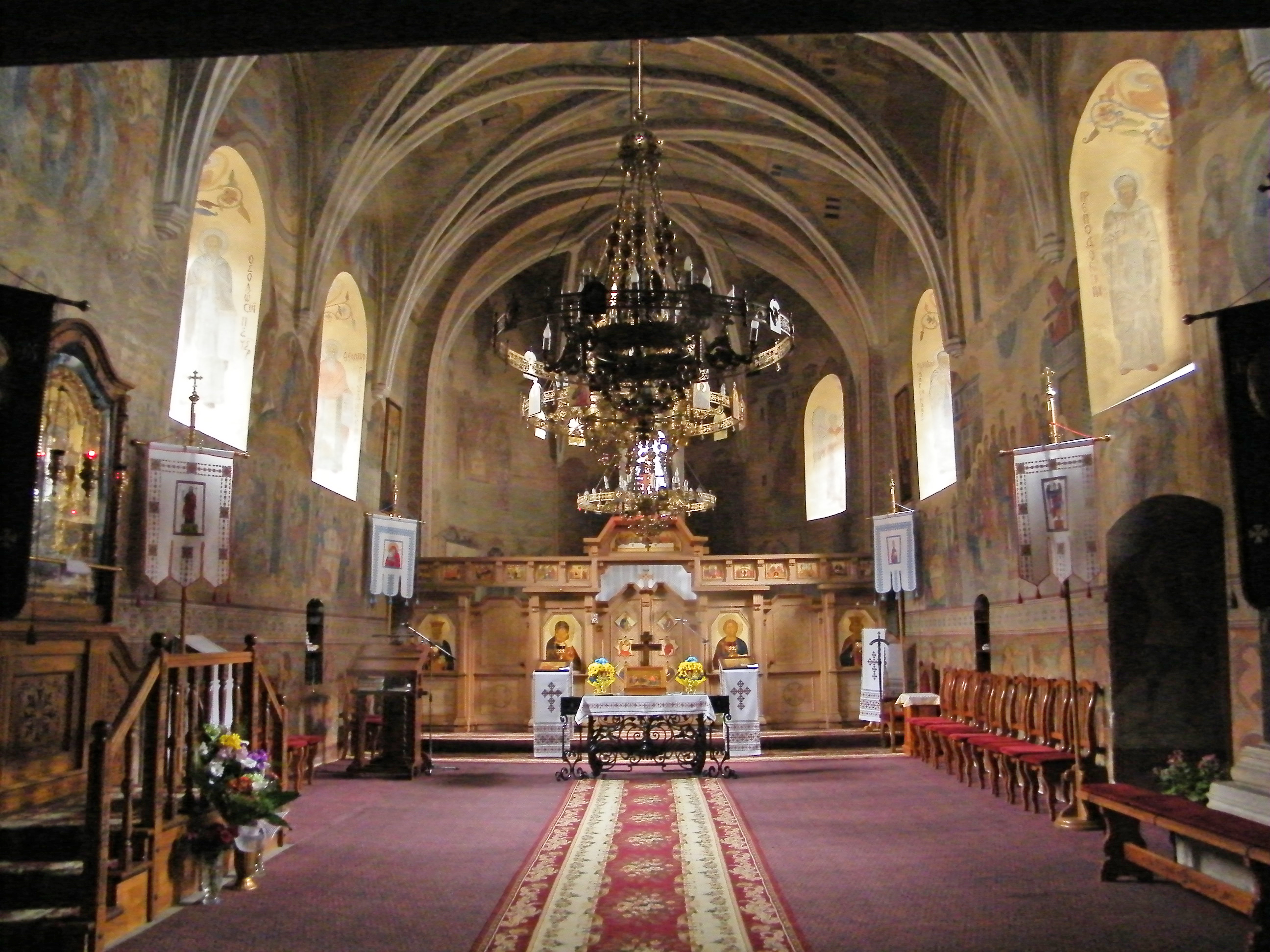
The interior of the church of Dormition of Mother of God in Univ Lavra, where Cardinal Levytsky is buried

On 16 June 1856, he was created Cardinal priest by Pope Pius IX. He died in the Univ Lavra on 14 January 1858.

Religious titles
Preceded by Antin Anhelovych	Metropolitans of Galicia and Archbishop of Lemberg; 1816–1858	Succeeded by Spyrydon Lytvynovych as administrator
Preceded by Václav Vilém Václavíček	Primate of Galicia and Lodomeria; 1848–1858	Title abolished
Preceded by Antin Anhelovych	Bishop of Przemyśl, Sambir and Sanok; 1813–1816	Succeeded by Ivan Snihurskyi
Catholic Church titles
Preceded by	Cardinal Priest; 1856–1858	Succeeded by
