= Ivan Stupnytskyi =

Ukrainian Greek Catholic hierarch

- Ukrainian Catholic Eparchy of Przemyśl, Sambir and Sanok
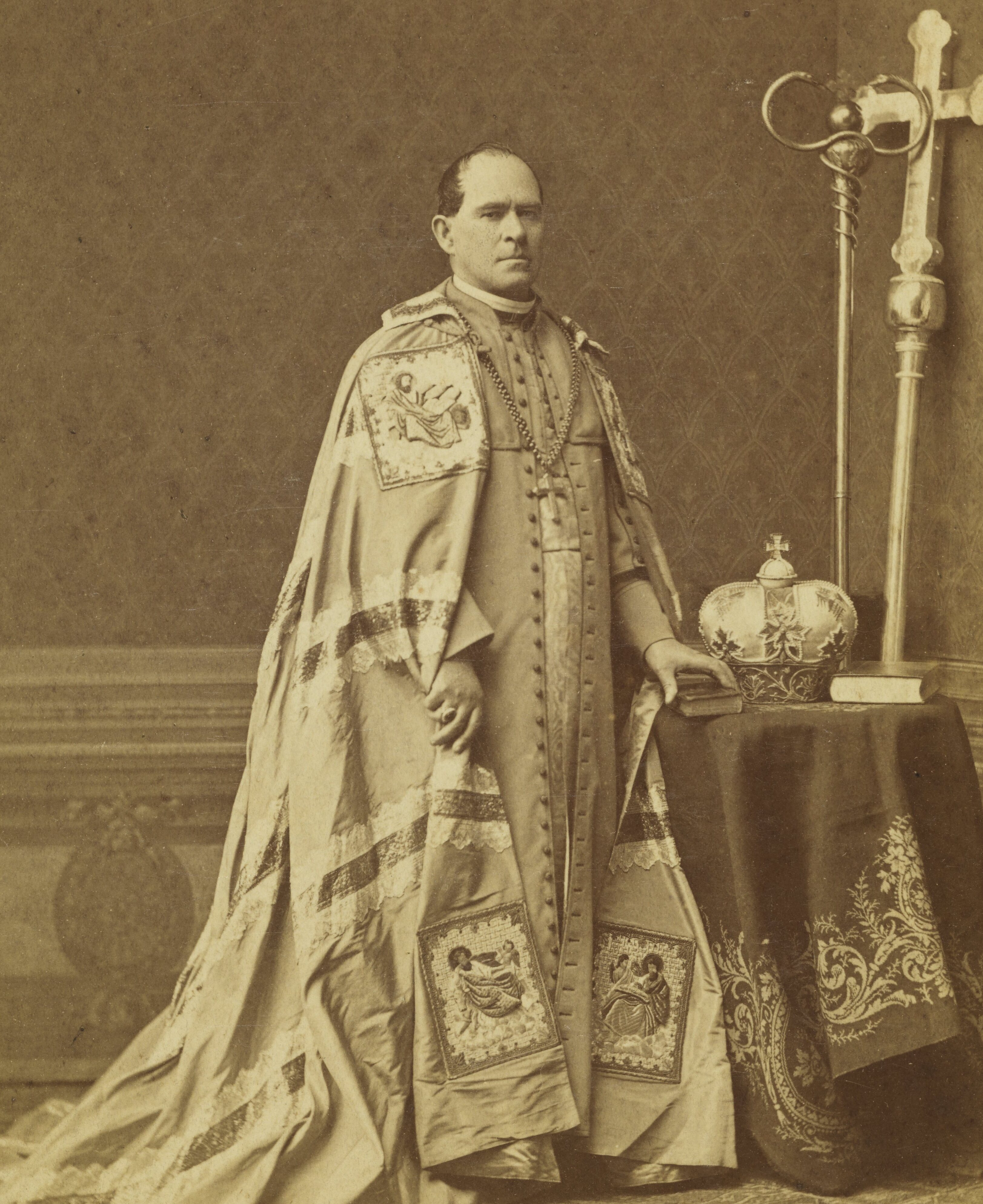
- Church: Ukrainian Greek Catholic Church
- In office: 20 October 1872 – 22 December 1890
- Predecessor: Joseph Sembratovych, as Ap. Administrator
- Successor: Julian Sas-Kuilovsky, as Ap. Administrator

Orders
- Ordination: 9 June 1842 (Priest) by Hryhoriy Yakhymovych
- Consecration: 20 October 1872 (Bishop) by Joseph Sembratovych

Personal details
- Born: Ivan Saturnin Stupnytskyi; 16 October 1816 Sukhorichya, Austrian Empire
- Died: 22 December 1890 (aged 74) Przemyśl, Austria-Hungary Empire

Ivan Stupnytskyi (Ukrainian: Іван Сатурнін Ступницький, Polish: Jan Saturnin Stupnicki; 16 October 1816 – 22 December 1890) was a Ukrainian Greek Catholic hierarch in present-day Ukraine and Poland. He was the Eparchial Bishop of the Ukrainian Catholic Eparchy of Przemyśl, Sambir and Sanok from 1872 to 1890.

Born in Sukhorichya, Austrian Empire (present day – Lviv Oblast, Ukraine) in the family of judge Andriy and his wife Anastasiya (née Bilyavska) Stupnytskti in 1816. He was ordained a priest on 9 June 1842 by Bishop Hryhoriy Yakhymovych. He worked as a Cancellor of the Greek-Catholic Archeparchy of Lviv from 1858 to 1872.

He was confirmed by the Holy See as an Eparchial Bishop of the Ukrainian Catholic Eparchy of Przemyśl, Sambir and Sanok on 8 September 1872. He was consecrated to the Episcopate on 20 October 1872. The principal consecrator was Metropolitan Joseph Sembratovych with 3 another co-consecrators.

He died in Przemyśl on 22 December 1890.

Catholic Church titles
Preceded by Joseph Sembratovych, as Ap. Administrator	Ukrainian Catholic Eparchy of Przemyśl, Sambir and Sanok; 1872–1890	Succeeded by Julian Sas-Kuilovsky, as Ap. Administrator
