= Joseph Sembratovych =

Head of the Ukrainian Greek Catholic Church from 1870 to 1882

- Metropolitan of Galicia, Archbishop of Lemberg
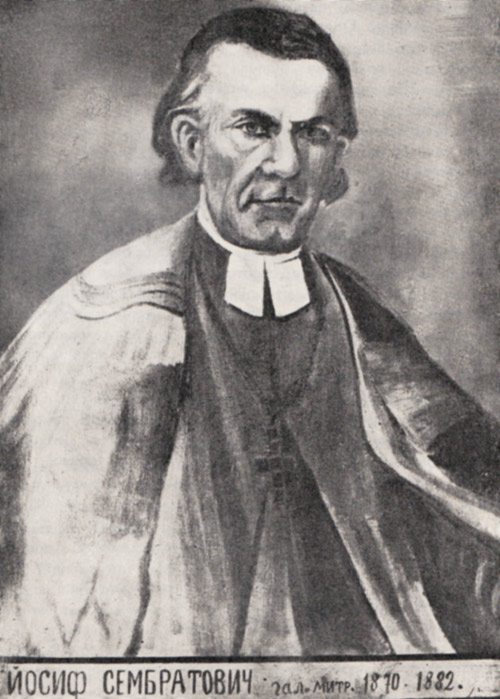
- Church: Ukrainian Greek Catholic Church
- Appointed: 27 June 1870
- Installed: 7 August 1870
- Term ended: 22 December 1882
- Predecessor: Spyrydon Lytvynovych
- Successor: Sylvester Sembratovych

Orders
- Ordination: 7 October 1845 (Priest)
- Consecration: 11 June 1865 (Bishop) by Spyrydon Lytvynovych

Personal details
- Born: 8 November 1821 Krynica-Zdrój, Kingdom of Galicia and Lodomeria, Austrian Empire
- Died: 23 October 1900 (aged 78) Rome, Kingdom of Italy

Joseph Sembratovych (Ukrainian: Йосиф Сембратович, Polish: Josyf Sembratowycz; 8 November 1821 in Krynica-Zdrój – 23 October 1900) was the Metropolitan Archbishop of the Ukrainian Greek Catholic Church from 1870 until his resignation in 1882.

== Life ==
Joseph Sembratovych was born on 8 November 1821, son of a priest of the eparchy of Przemyśl. Since 1841 he studied in Wien and at the end of his studies, on 7 October 1845 he was ordained Priest. He remained in Wien where he obtained a doctorate in theology in June 1846. Returned to Galicia, he started his career in the Seminary of Lviv, moving later in 1852 to Wien where he was appointed vice-rector of the Greek Seminary, and later he appointed Professor of Biblical Studies in the University of Lviv.

On 24 March 1865 he was appointed titular bishop of Nazianzus, and consecrated Bishop in St. George's Cathedral, Lviv on 11 June 1865 by Metropolitan Spyrydon Lytvynovych. He moved to Rome where he became the prelate of the Greek-Rite students at College of the Propaganda. In 1867 he was appointed Apostolic Administrator of the Archeparchy of Przemyśl.

On 18 May 1870 Joseph Sembratovych was designated Metropolitan of Lviv, i.e. the primate of the Ukrainian Greek Catholic Church, by Emperor Franz Joseph I of Austria and so confirmed by Pope Pius IX on 27 June 1870. The enthronement occurred on 7 August 1870.

Even if before his appointment as Primate Joseph Sembratovych was supported by the Polish Galicians and unpopular with the Ukrainophils and the Ukrainian Russophiles, Joseph Sembratovych during his reign fully espoused the Russophile movement on a level which collided with Ukrainophil politic of the Austria-Hungary government. He also displeased the Polish because his campaign against drunkenness which deprived them of considerable profits. The case that finally led to his resignation was the affair of Ivan Naumovich, a priest who favored the conversion of a whole village to the Russian Orthodox Church. The Austrian government asked and obtained his resignations, tendered on 22 December 1882. The next Metropolitan was his nephew Sylvester Sembratovych (later also a cardinal).

After his resignation, he moved to Rome where he died on 23 October 1900.

== Notes ==
Catholic Church titles
Preceded by Spyrydon Lytvynovych	Metropolitan of Galicia, Archbishop of Lemberg; 1870–1882	Succeeded by Sylvester Sembratovych as Ap. Administrator
Preceded by Toma Polyanskyi	Bishop of Premissel and Saanig (as apostolic administrator since 1867); 1869–1872	Succeeded by Ivan Stupnytskyi
