= Julian Sas-Kuilovsky =

Head of the Ukrainian Greek Catholic Church from 1899 to 1900

- Metropolitan of Galicia, Archbishop of Lemberg
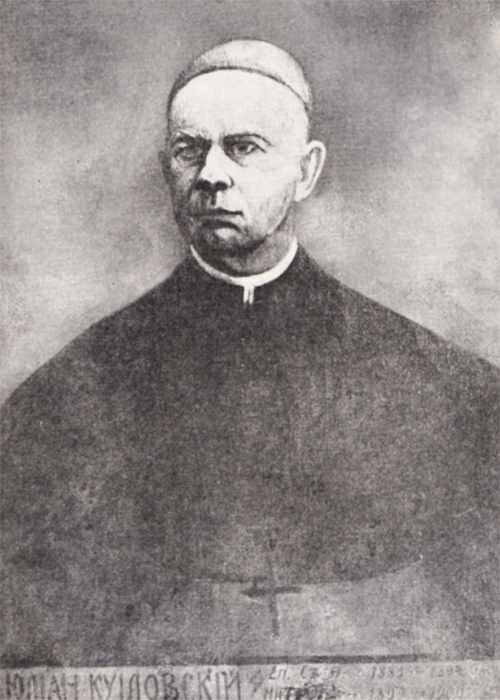
- Church: Ukrainian Greek Catholic Church
- Installed: August 30, 1899
- Term ended: May 4, 1900
- Predecessor: Sylvester Sembratovych
- Successor: Andrey Sheptytsky

Orders
- Ordination: April 1, 1854 (Priest)
- Consecration: June 26, 1890 (Bishop) by Sylvester Sembratovych

Personal details
- Born: May 1, 1826 Koniuszki Królewskie, Kingdom of Galicia and Lodomeria, Austrian Empire
- Died: May 4, 1900 (aged 74) Lemberg, Kingdom of Galicia and Lodomeria, Austria-Hungary
- Coat of arms

Julian Sas-Kuilovsky (Ukrainian: Куїловський Юліан; 1 May 1826 – 4 May 1900) was the Metropolitan Archbishop of the Ukrainian Greek Catholic Church from 1899 until his death in 1900.

== Life ==
Julian Sas-Kuilovsky was born on May 1, 1826, in the village of Konyushky-Korolivsk, in Sambir Raion, Lviv Oblast, Ukraine to a family of nobles. He studied philosophy in the Lviv University which expelled him due his participation to the revolutionary risings which led to the revolution of 1848. After the defeats in 1848, he followed as sotnik (Captain) the general Józef Bem in his revolutionary campaign till the final defeat of the Battle of Segesvár. After a heavy wound on the face, he went to Paris where he studied in the Saint-Sulpice Seminary and on April 1, 1854, he was ordained as a priest.

Julian Sas-Kuilovsky served as priest one year in the island of Corfu and after an amnesty in 1857 he could return in Galicia, where he served in a parish near Przemyśl from 1859 to 1884, where from 1883 to 1884 he served also as rector of the Greek Catholic Seminary. On June 26, 1890, he was consecrated auxiliary bishop of the Eparchy of Przemyśl by Metropolitan Sylvester Sembratovych. On 3 August 1891 he was appointed bishop of Stanyslaviv (now Ivano-Frankivsk). He did not won sympathy among the Ukrainians because of his pro-Polish attitude.

At end 1898 he was appointed Metropolitan Archbishop of Lviv, i.e. the primate of the Ukrainian Greek Catholic Church. His appointment was later confirmed by Pope Leo XIII on June 19, 1899 and he was enthroned on August 30, 1899. Julian Sas-Kuilovsky died a few months later, on May 4, 1900, in Lviv.

== Sources ==
- Cz. Lechicki, Kuiłowski Julian in Polish Biographical Dictionary, volume X
- Dmytro Błażejowśkyj, Historical sematism of the Eparchy of Peremysl including the Apostolic Administration of Lemkivscyna (1828-1939), Lviv 1995

Religious titles
Preceded by Sylvester Sembratovych	Metropolitans of Galicia and Archbishop of Lemberg (as locum tenens in 1898); 1899-1900	Succeeded by Andrey Sheptytsky
Preceded by Yulian Pelesh	Bishop of Stanislau; 1891—1899	Succeeded by Andrey Sheptytsky
Preceded by Ivan Stupnytskyi	Bishop of Premissel and Saanig (as apostolic administrator); 1890 – 1891	Succeeded by Yulian Pelesh
