= Drusiliana =

Civitas (town) of Roman North Africa

Drusiliana was a civitas (town) of Roman North Africa. Joseph Bingham called it a city of the Roman province of Mauretania Caesariensis. An inscription of Constantine the Great was found in the city ruins and it appears on the Tabula Peutingeriana The town has been tentatively identified with ruins near Khanguet-el-Kdim in northern Tunisia. Located at 36.249547°N 8.907667°E. Epigraphical evidence suggest Constantine the Great undertook some works in the city in 312AD.

The town was also the seat of an ancient Christian bishopric, suffragan to Archdiocese of Carthage. This Bishopric is only known for the presence of bishops at the Council of Carthage (411), which saw gathered together Catholic bishops and Donatists of Africa: the Catholic side was represented by Rufino, while the Donatist by Restitutus.

The bishopric survives today as a titular see of the Roman Catholic Church. The current bishop is Yosyf Milyan of Kyiv.

Known bishops

- Rufino (mentioned in 411)
- Restitutus (mentioned in 411) (Bishop Donatist)
- Joseph Klemann (South West Africa) (24 February 1931–21 March 1960)
- José María Cirarda Lachiondo (Spain) (9 April 1960–22 July 1968)
- Fernando Errázuriz Gandarillas (José Ismael Errázuriz Gandarillas) (Chile) (31 January 1969–31 August 1973)
- Aurélio Granada Escudeiro (Azores) (18 March 1974–30 June 1979)
- Affonso Felippe Gregory (Brazil) (2 August 1979–16 July 1987)
- Horácio Coelho Cristino (Portugal) (20 August 1987–8 May 1995)
- Giuseppe Merisi (Italy) (8 September 1995–14 November 2005)
- Yosyf Milyan (Ukraine) (16 April 2009–present)
