= Spyrydon Lytvynovych =

Head of the Ukrainian Greek Catholic Church from 1864 to 1869

- Metropolitan of Galicia, Archbishop of Lemberg
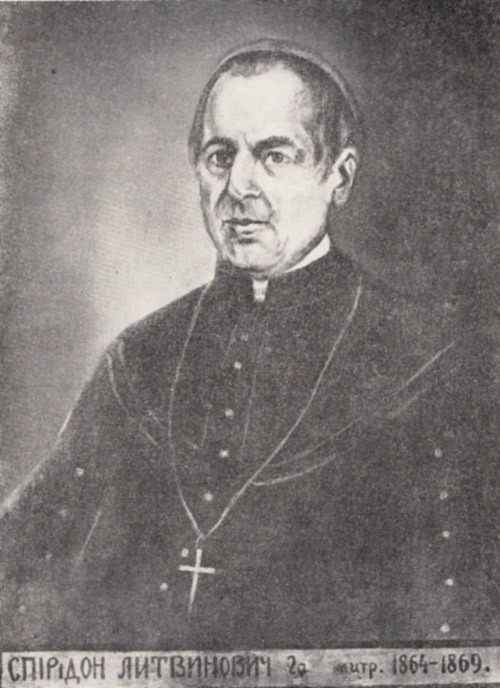
- Church: Ukrainian Greek Catholic Church
- Appointed: 28 September 1863
- Installed: 5 May 1864
- Term ended: 4 June 1869
- Predecessor: Hryhory Yakhymovych
- Successor: Joseph Sembratovych

Orders
- Ordination: 19 July 1835 (Priest) by Michael Levytsky
- Consecration: 17 May 1857 (Bishop) by Ioan Lemeni

Personal details
- Born: 6 December 1810 Nadrichne, Kingdom of Galicia and Lodomeria, Austrian Empire
- Died: 4 June 1869 (aged 58) Lemberg, Kingdom of Galicia and Lodomeria, Austria-Hungary

Spyrydon Lytvynovych (Ukrainian: Спиридон Литвинович, Polish: Spirydion Litwinowicz; 6 December 1810 – 4 June 1869) was the Metropolitan Archbishop of the Ukrainian Greek Catholic Church from 1864 until his death in 1869.

== Life ==
Spyrydon Lytvynovych was born on 6 December 1810 in Nadrichne, in Austrian Galicia (present-day in Ternopil Raion, Ternopil Oblast, Ukraine). He graduated of philosophy and theology at the University of Lviv. He was ordained priest on 19 July 1835 and returned to Galicia where he served as preached and teacher of religion. In February 1848 he was appointed as Greek Catholic pastor of the St. Barbara parish in Wien. Soon after he was appointed honorary Canon, and in 1852 he became the first rector of the newly established Greek Catholic seminary.

In March 1857 he was appointed auxiliary bishop of the Ukrainian Catholic Archeparchy of Lviv and consecrated Bishop in Wien by retired Romanian Greek-Catholic Archbishop Ioan Lemeni on 17 May 1857.

At the death of Cardinal Mykhajlo Levitsky in 1858 he was appointed Administrator of the Archeparchy. In 1861 he was elected Deputy Speaker of the Parliament of Galicia. Since 1861 he was a member of the Austrian State Council of which he became Vice President in 1861.

After the death of Metropolitan Hryhory Yakhymovych, on 30 June 1863 Spyrydon Lytvynovych was designed Metropolitan of Lviv by Emperor Franz Joseph I of Austria and so confirmed by Pope Pius IX on 28 September 1863. The enthronement occurred on 5 May 1864. He led and obtained the canonization of Saint Josaphat Kuntsevych in 1867. Spyrydon Lytvynovych died on 4 June 1869 in Lviv.

== Notes ==
Religious titles
Preceded by Mykhajlo Levitsky	Metropolitan of Galicia (administrator); 1858—1860	Succeeded by Hryhoriy Yakhymovych
Preceded by Hryhoriy Yakhymovych	Metropolitan of Galicia and Archbishop of Lemberg; 1863—1869	Succeeded by Yosyf Sembratovych
