= Ukrainian Catholic Archeparchy of Przemyśl–Warsaw =

Archeparchy of the Ukrainian Greek Catholic Church in Poland

Coordinates: 49°46′51″N 22°46′13″E

Archeparchy of Przemyśl–Warsaw Archidioecesis Premisliensis–Varsaviensis ritus byzantini ucraini Archieparchia przemysko-warszawska
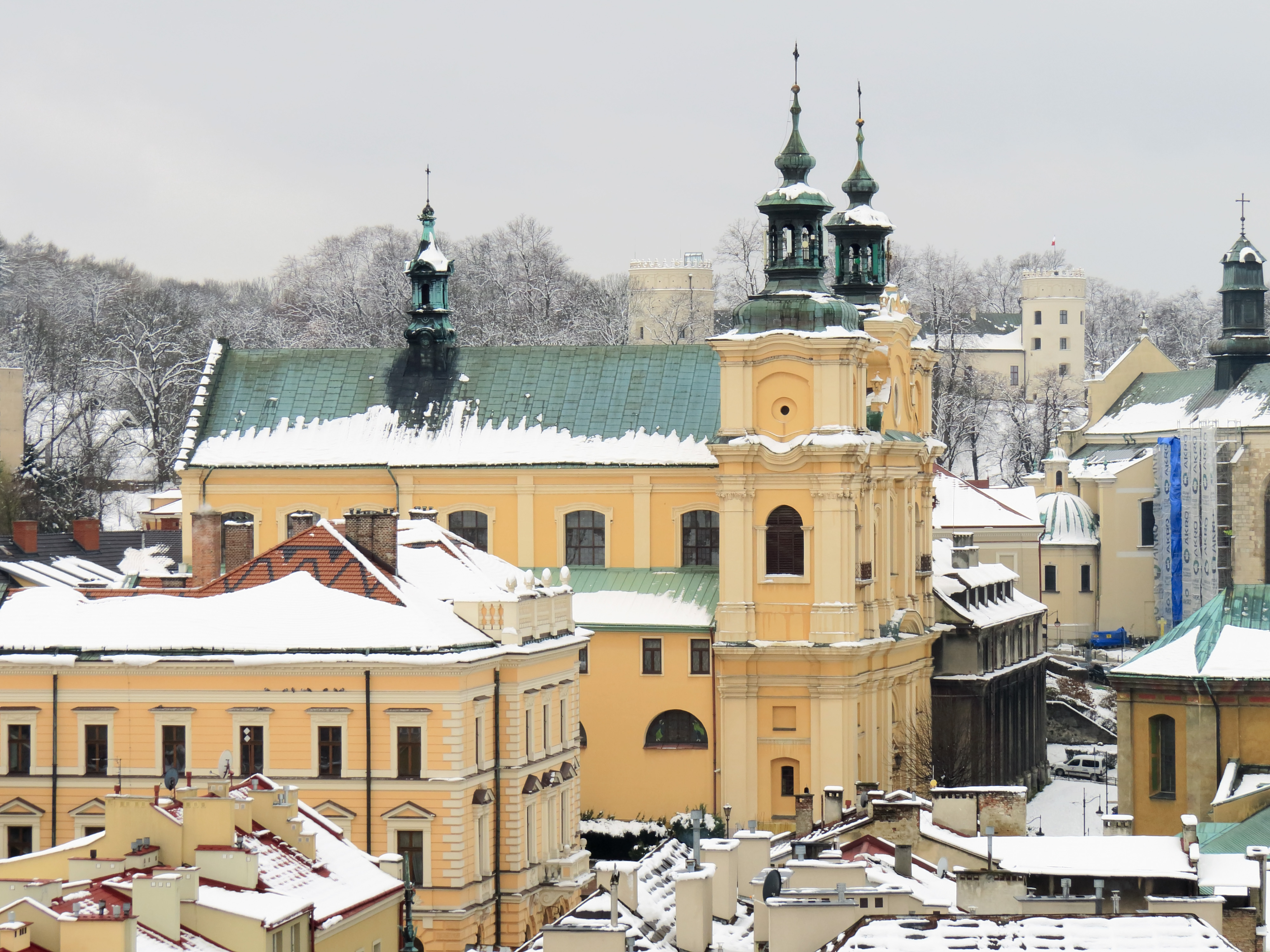
- Seat of the Archeparchy: The Ukrainian Catholic Cathedral of the St. John the Baptist, Przemyśl, Poland

Location
- Country: Poland
- Territory: Poland
- Ecclesiastical province: Archeparchy of Przemyśl–Warsaw
- Headquarters: Przemyśl, Poland
- Population: 14,935

Information
- Sui iuris church: Ukrainian Greek Catholic
- Rite: Byzantine Rite
- Established: 24 May 1996
- Cathedral: Cathedral of St. John the Baptist, Przemyśl

Current leadership
- Pope: Leo XIV
- Major Archbishop: Archbishop Sviatoslav Shevchuk
- Metropolitan Archbishop: Eugeniusz Popowicz, Archbishop of the Ukrainian Catholic Archeparchy of Przemyśl–Warsaw

Map
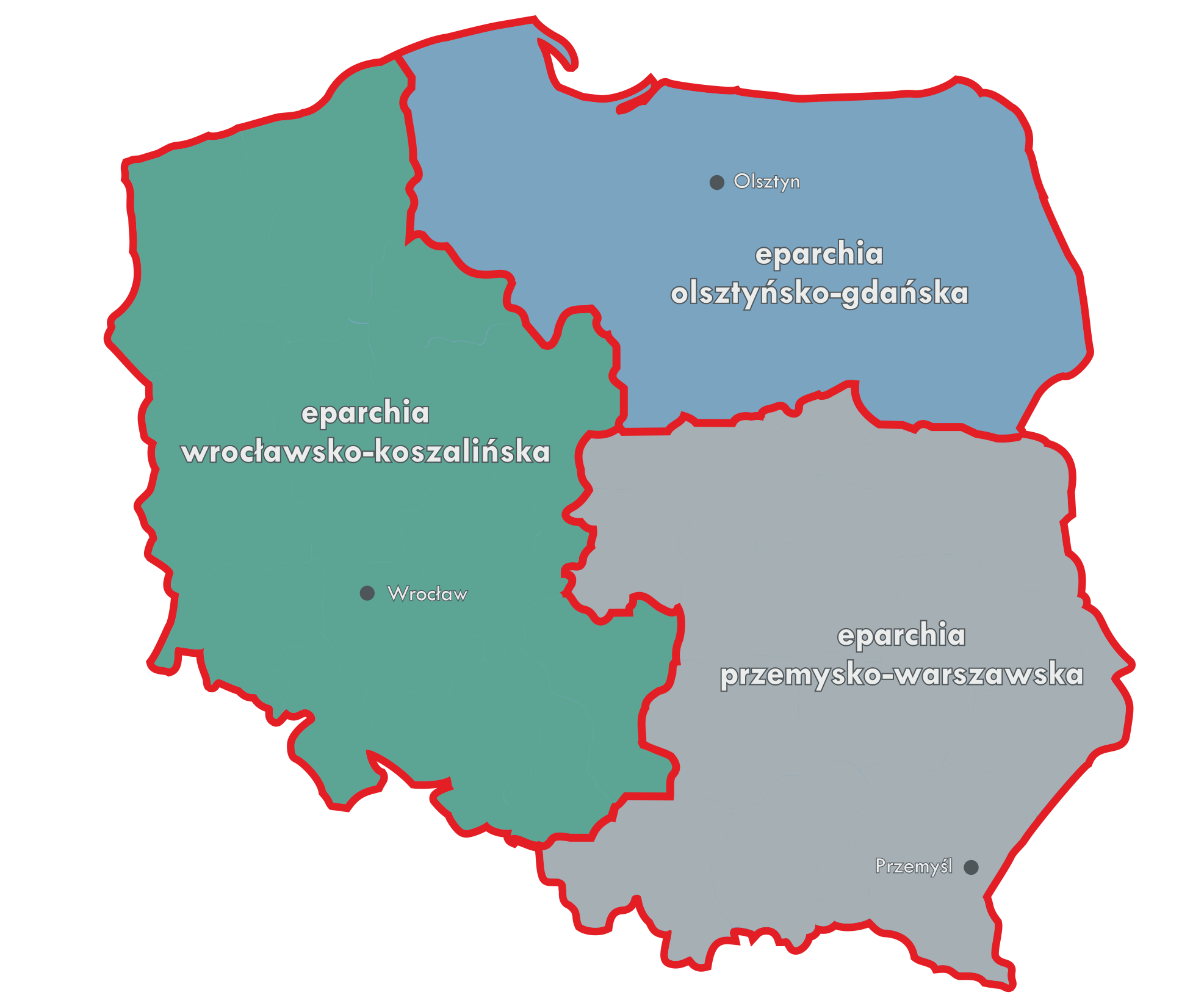
- Archeparchy of Przemyśl–Warsaw in grey

Website
- http://cerkiew.org/

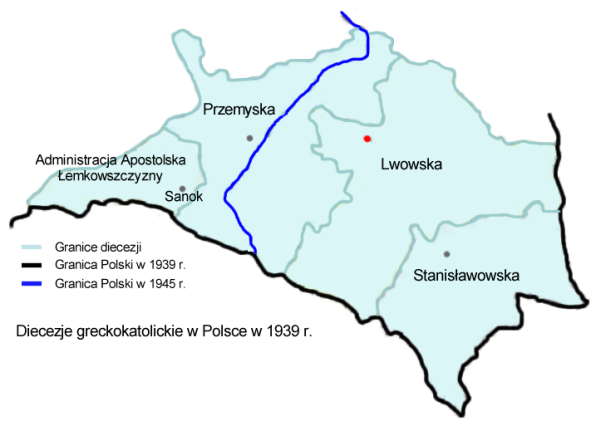
Map of the Ukrainian Catholic Church in the province of Lviv in 1939

The Ukrainian Catholic Archeparchy of Przemyśl–Warsaw (Latin: Archidioecesis Premisliensis–Varsaviensis ritus byzantini ucraini, Ukrainian: Перемишльсько-Варшавська архієпархія) is an ecclesiastical territory or ecclesiastical province of the Ukrainian Greek Catholic Church — a particular Eastern Catholic Church, that is located in the south-eastern part of Poland. It was erected in 1996. Its Byzantine Rite services are conducted in the Ukrainian language. As a metropolitan see, it has two suffragan sees: Olsztyn–Gdańsk and Wrocław-Koszalin. The incumbent ordinary of the archeparchy is Eugeniusz Popowicz. It is assisted and protected by the Dicastery for the Eastern Churches in Rome. The cathedral church of the archeparchy is the Cathedral of St. John the Baptist, in the city of Przemyśl. Although the national capital of Warsaw was added to its title, there is no co-cathedral.

== Former cathedrals ==
Both former cathedrals (now Orthodox churches) are elsewhere in Podkarpackie Voivodeship:

- Former Ukrainian Catholic Pentecost Church in Sanok, now the Holy Trinity Orthodox Cathedral, Sanok,
- Supraśl Orthodox Monastery of the Annunciation, in Supraśl.

== Ecclesiastical province ==
The Metropolitan has two Suffragan Eparchies:

- Ukrainian Catholic Eparchy of Olsztyn–Gdańsk
- Ukrainian Catholic Eparchy of Wrocław-Koszalin

== Statistics ==
As per 2023, it pastorally served 14,935 Eastern Catholics in 44 parishes and 14 missions with 45 priests (34 diocesan, 11 religious), 4 deacons, 50 lay religious (14 brothers, 36 sisters), 8 seminarians.

== History ==
In 1087 the Eparchy of Przemyśl was established in the Principality of Peremyshl as Eastern Orthodox eparchy.

The town initially did not adhere to the Union of Brest (1595–96) thus having for a short period two bishops. In 1679, Innocenty Winnicki became the Orthodox bishop and on 23 June 1691 Innocenty publicly accepted the Union for himself and for his eparchy, and he remained the only bishop of the town after that the Greek Catholic bishop Ivan Malaxovskyj on the same year moved to Chełm. Innokentiy Vynnyckyj was succeeded in 1700 by his brother by Yurij Vynnyckyj who later became Metropolitan of Kyiv and Galicia.

On 10 February 1934, it lost territory to establish the Apostolic Administration of Łemkowszczyzna

In 1946, Bishop Josaphat Kotsylovsky was arrested and extradited to the USSR, where he died in prison. In Poland, where the city of Przemysl and a majority of the eparchy was located (a portion was in the Ukrainian SSR), all priests were arrested and given sentences of between four and ten years. One hundred Ukrainian Greek Catholic priests remained in Poland. After their release, they kept a low profile, serving in the Latin rite Church, many as convent chaplains. Sixteen worked giving pastoral care to Ukrainian Catholics at pastoral centres. In 1977, the Latin Catholic Primate of Poland's Vicar-General for Ukrainian Greek Catholics was also named Dean of the Przemysl Eparchy by the Vatican. Cardinal Josyf Slipyj objected to this action as contrary to his prerogatives and appointed the same priest Administrator of the eparchy. In 1981, a second Vicar-General to the Primate was appointed for Ukrainian Greek Catholics in Poland outside of the traditional boundaries of the Przemysl Eparchy.

On 16 January 1991, it gained back the territory from the suppressed daughter Apostolic Exarchate of Łemkowszczyzna (above, promoted in 1941, de facto defunct since 1947).

On 24 May 1996, the eparchy was promoted to Metropolitan Archdiocese of Przemyśl–Warszawa (Polish) / Przemysl–Warsaw (English) / Przemyśl–Varsavia (Curiate Italian) / Premislien(sis)–Varsavien(sis) ritus byzantini ucraini (Latin adjective).

It enjoyed a Papal visit from the Polish Pope John Paul II in June 1999.

On 25 November 2020 it lost the territory along with the Ukrainian Catholic Eparchy of Wrocław–Koszalin to establish the new Ukrainian Catholic Eparchy of Olsztyn–Gdańsk.

On 6 February 2023, the Archeparchy of Przemyśl–Warsaw, as well as the entire metropolis of Przemyśl-Warsaw, taking into account the previous decision of the Ukrainian Greek Catholic Church in Ukraine and the opinion of the Delegates of the Joint Diocesan Council in Porszewice in June 2022, decided to switch to the Revised Julian calendar from 1 September 2023.

== Episcopal ordinaries ==
(all Ukrainian rite)

Eparchs (Bishops) of Przemyśl (Ukrainian Rite)

- Innokentiy Vynnyckyj (1679–1700), adhered to the Union of Brest in 1691
- Yurij Vynnyckyj (later Metropolitan of Kiev) (1700–1713)
- Lev Kiszka (later Metropolitan of Kiev) (1713–1715)
- Jeronim Ustryckyj (1715–1746)
- Onufrij Sumljanskyj (1746–1762)
- Atanasij Sheptytskyj (1762–1779)
- Maksymilian Rylo, Administrator (1780–1785)
- Maksymilian Rylo (1785–1793)
- Petro Bilyanskyi, Administrator (1793–1796)
- Antin Anhelovych (later Metropolitan of Lviv) (1796–1808.03.16)
- Mihail Lewicki (later Cardinal) (1813.09.20 – 1816.03.08)
- Ivan Snihurskyi (1818.03.30 – 1847.08.24)
- Hryhoriy Yakhymovych (later Metropolitan of Lviv) (1848.09.05 – 1860.03.23)
- Toma Polyanskyi (1860.03.23 – 1867.10.01)
- Joseph Sembratovych, Ap. Administrator (1867.10.01 – 1872.09.08) Tit. Archbishop
- Ivan Stupnytskyi (1872.09.08 – 1890.12.22)
- Julian Sas-Kuilovsky, Ap. Administrator (1890.12. – 1891.09.22)
  - ?= Auxiliary Bishop: Bishop Julian Kuiłovskyi (later Archbishop) (1890.06.26 – 1891.09.22)
- Yulian Pelesh (1891.09.22 – 1896.04.22)
- Konstantyn Chekhovych (1896.11.17 – 1915.04.28)
- Blessed Josaphat Joseph Kotsylovsky, O.S.B.M. (1917.01.29 – 1947.11.17)
  - Auxiliary Bishop: Blessed Bishop Hryhoriy Lakota (1926.02.10 – 1950.11.12)
- See vacant (1947.11.17 – 1977.04.02)
- Ivan Choma (1977.04.02 – 1991.06.16) (in exile, residence in Rome)
- Jan Martyniak (1991.01.16 – 1996.05.24 see below), succeeding as previous Titular Bishop of Vardimissa (1989.07.20 – 1991.01.16) and Auxiliary Bishop of Przemyśl of the Ukrainians (1989.07.20 – 1991.01.16)

Metropolitan Archeparchs (Archbishops) of Przemyśl–Warsaw

- Jan Martyniak (see above 1996.05.24 – 2015.11.07)
- Eugeniusz Popowicz (2015.11.07 – ...), succeeding as former Titular Bishop of Horrea Cœlia (2013.11.04 – 2015.11.07) and Auxiliary Bishop of Przemyśl–Warszawa of the Ukrainians (2013.11.04 – 2015.11.07).

== Sources and external links ==
- GCatholic.org, with Google map & satellite photo - data for all sections
- Catholic Hierarchy
- Archeparchy website (Polish and Ukrainian)
- Herbermann, Charles, ed. (1913). "Diocese of Przemysl, Sambor, and Sanok" . Catholic Encyclopedia. New York: Robert Appleton Company.
- Decree of the Metropolis of Przemyśl-Warsaw on the transition to the Gregorian calendar dated February 6, 2023
