= Mykola Skorodynskyi =

Ukrainian Greek Catholic hierarch

- Ruthenian Catholic Eparchy of Lviv, Halych and Kamianets-Podilskyi
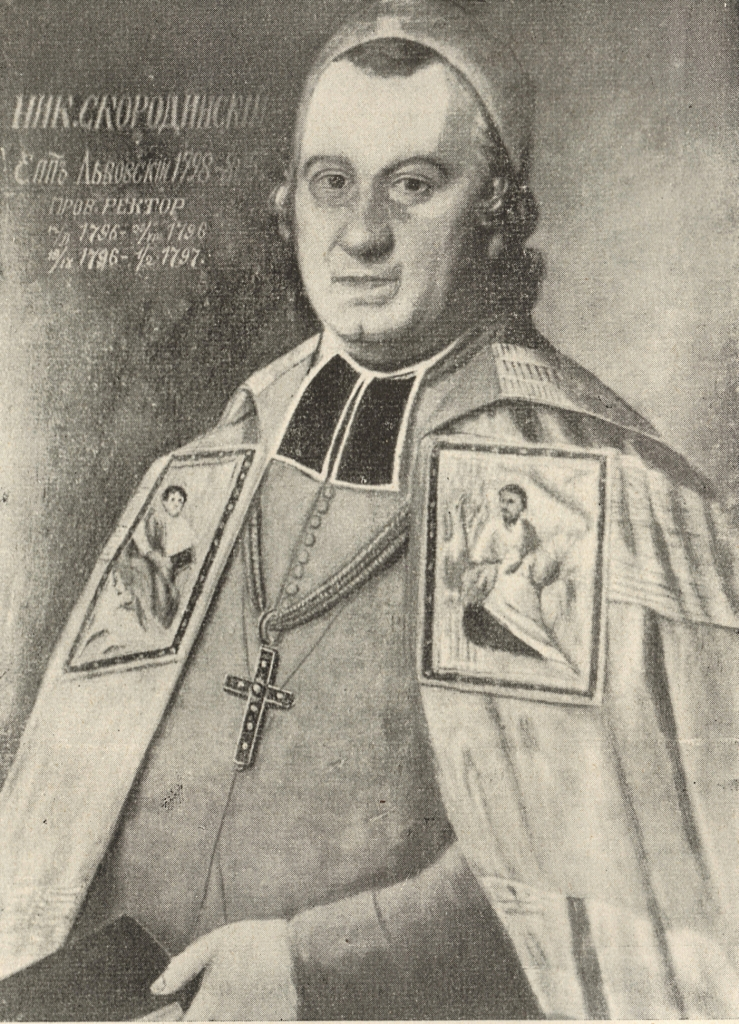
- Church: Ukrainian Greek Catholic Church
- In office: 28 September 1798 – 23 May 1805
- Predecessor: Petro Bilyanskyi
- Successor: Antin Anhelovych
- Other post: Rector of Lviv University (1804–1805)

Orders
- Ordination: 6 January 1782 (Priest) by Petro Bilyanskyi
- Consecration: 10 March 1799 (Bishop) by Porfyriy Skarbek-Vazhynskyi

Personal details
- Born: Mykola Mykhaylovych Skorodynskyi; 15 January 1751 Zboriv, Polish–Lithuanian Commonwealth (present day Ternopil Oblast, Ukraine)
- Died: 23 May 1805 (aged 54) Lviv, Austrian Empire (present day Ukraine)

Mykola Skorodynskyi (Ukrainian: Микола Скородинський, Polish: Mikołaj Skorodyński; 15 January 1751 – 23 May 1805) was a Ukrainian Greek Catholic hierarch. He was the Eparchial Bishop of the Ruthenian Catholic Eparchy of Lviv, Halych and Kamianets-Podilskyi from 1798 to 1805.

== Life ==
Born in Zboriv, Polish–Lithuanian Commonwealth (present day Ternopil Oblast, Ukraine) in the family of Ukrainian Greek-Catholic priest Fr. Mykhaylo Skorodynskyi in 1751. He was ordained a priest on 6 January 1782 by Bishop Petro Bilyanskyi. He was a professor in the Lviv University and in the Lviv Theological Seminary and after – vice-rector in the same Seminary. Also served as a vicar general in his native Eparchy (1787–1798).

He was confirmed by the Holy See as an Eparchial Bishop of the Ruthenian Catholic Eparchy of Lviv, Halych and Kamianets-Podilskyi on 28 September 1798. He was consecrated to the Episcopate on 10 March 1799. The principal consecrator was Bishop Porfyriy Skarbek-Vazhynskyi.

He died in Lviv on 23 May 1805.

Catholic Church titles
Preceded by Petro Bilyanskyi	Ruthenian Catholic Eparchy of Lviv, Halych and Kamianets-Podilskyi; 1798–1805	Succeeded by Antin Anhelovych (as Metropolitan-Archbishop of Halych, Lviv and Kamianets)
Educational offices
Preceded by Jan Zemantsek	Rector of Lviv University; 1804—1805	Succeeded by Franciszek Kodesch
