= Smerekowiec =

- Village
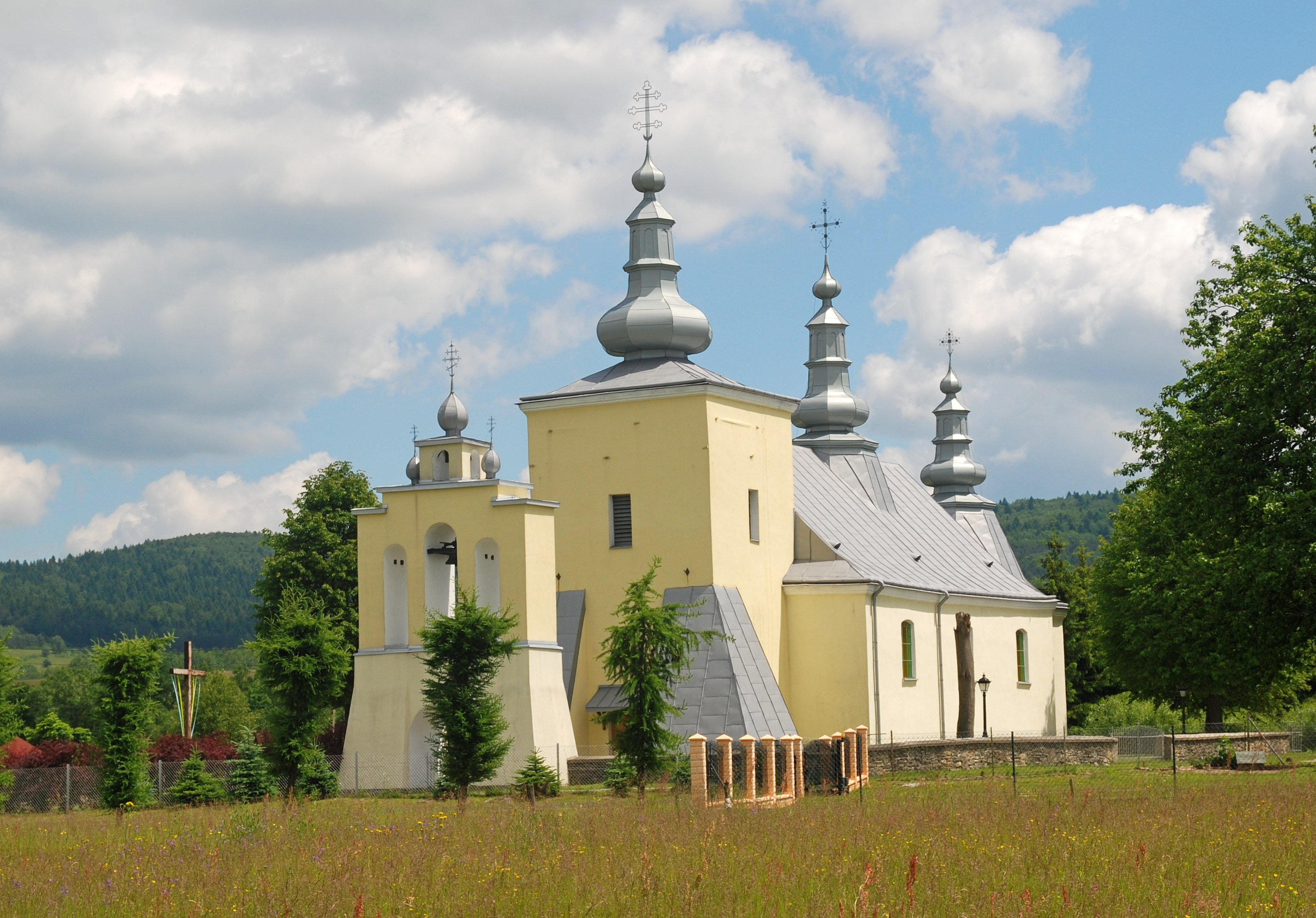
- Church of Saint Michael Archangel

- Location within Poland
- Coordinates: 49°31′N 21°14′E
- Country: Poland
- Voivodeship: Lesser Poland
- County: Gorlice
- Gmina: Uście Gorlickie

Smerekowiec [smɛrɛˈkɔvʲɛt͡s] (Ukrainian: Смерековець, Smerekovets’) is a village in the administrative district of Gmina Uście Gorlickie, within Gorlice County, Lesser Poland Voivodeship, in southern Poland, close to the border with Slovakia.
