= Pidbirtsi =

Village in Lviv Oblast, Ukraine

Pidbirtsi Підбірці
- Village
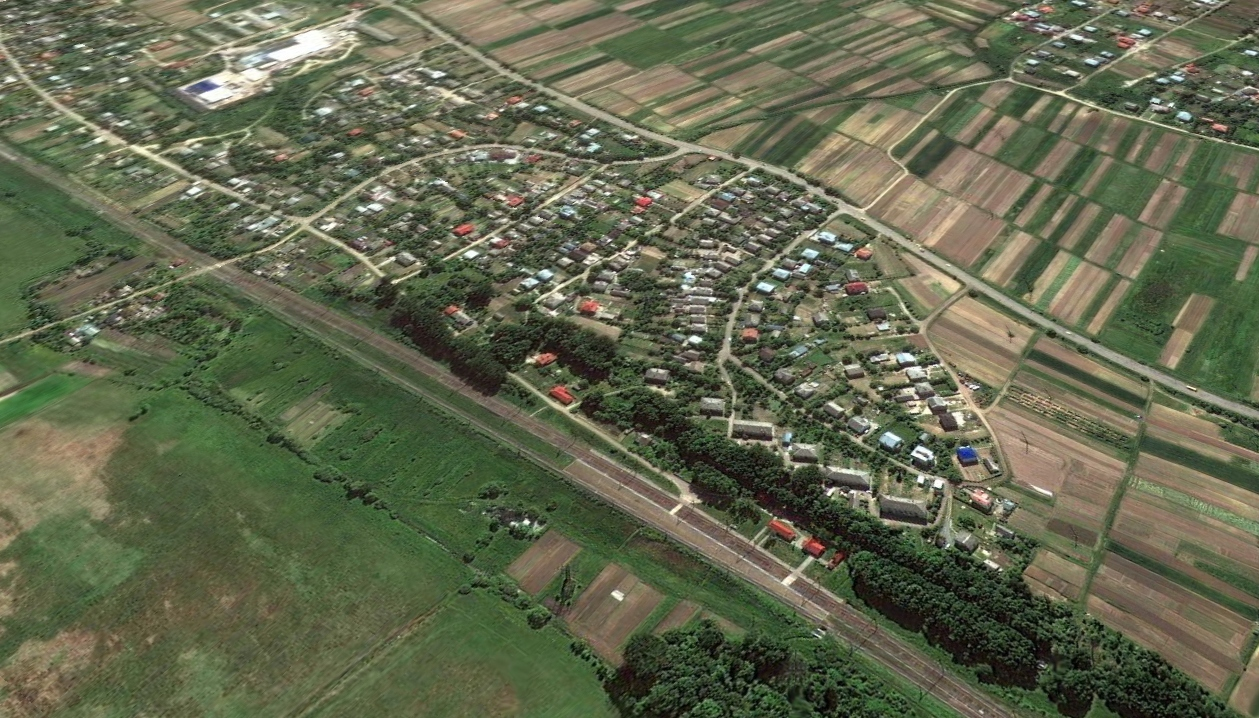

- Location within Lviv Oblast Location within Ukraine
- Coordinates: 49°50′37″N 24°08′59″E
- Country: Ukraine
- Oblast: Lviv Oblast
- Raion: Lviv Raion
- Elevation: 260 m (850 ft)

Population (2001)
  - Total: 2,843
- Time zone: UTC+2 (EET)
  - Summer (DST): UTC+3 (EEST)

Pidbirtsi (Ukrainian: Підбірці) is a village in Lviv urban hromada, Lviv Raion of Lviv Oblast in Ukraine.

On 22 September 1939 Pibdirtsi served as a site of negotiations between German and Soviet representatives, which concerned the withdrawal of Wehrmacht towards the demarcation line introduced by the Molotov-Ribbentrop Pact.

Pidbirtsi was previously located in Pustomyty Raion until it was abolished on 18 July 2020 as part of the administrative reform of Ukraine, which reduced the number of raions of Lviv Oblast to seven. The area of Pustomyty Raion was merged into Lviv Raion.
