= Hryhoriy Yakhymovych =

Head of the Ukrainian Greek Catholic Church from 1860 to 1863

- Metropolitan of Galicia, Archbishop of Lemberg, Bishop of Kamenez
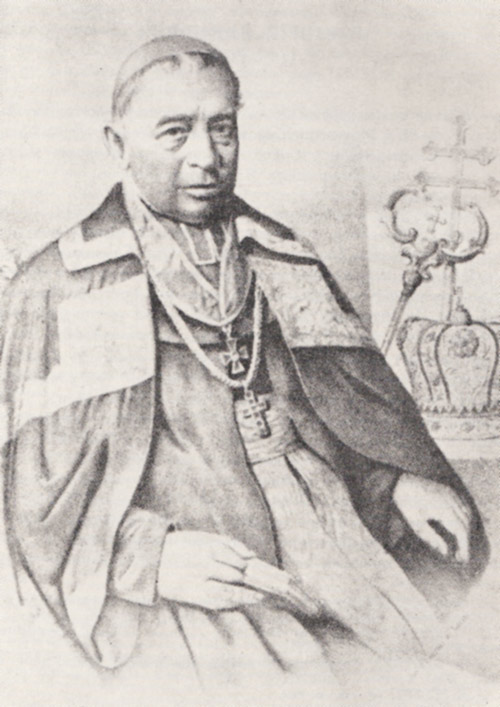
- Church: Ukrainian Greek Catholic Church
- Installed: 23 March 1860
- Term ended: 29 April 1863
- Predecessor: Mykhaylo Levitsky
- Successor: Spyrydon Lytvynovych
- Other post: Bishop of Premissel (1849-1860)

Orders
- Ordination: 14 September 1816 (Priest)
- Consecration: 21 November 1841 (Bishop) by Mykhaylo Levitsky

Personal details
- Born: 16 February 1792 Podborce (modern Pidbirtsi), Kingdom of Galicia and Lodomeria, Habsburg monarchy
- Died: 29 April 1863 (aged 71) Lemberg (modern Lviv), Kingdom of Galicia and Lodomeria, Austrian Empire

Hryhoriy Yakhymovych (Ukrainian: Григорій Яхимович, Polish: Grzegorz Jachimowicz; 16 February 1792 – 29 April 1863) was the Metropolitan Archbishop of the Ukrainian Greek Catholic Church from 1860 until his death in 1863, as well as a leading figure in the Ukrainian National Revival.

== Life ==
Hryhoriy Yakhymovych was born on 16 February 1792 in Podborce (today Pidbirtsi), a town in the region of Galicia, a part of the Polish–Lithuanian Commonwealth. He went to school in Lemberg (modern day Lviv in Ukraine), which had since been incorporated into the Austrian Empire, and was ordained on 14 September 1816. During 1818–1819, he served as a parish priest at a Greek Catholic church in Vienna, while he was studying at the Higher Scientific Institute for Diocesan Priests at St. Augustine's. He would go on to earn doctorates in theology, philosophy, and the liberals arts from the institute. He returned to Galicia in 1819, working as the head of the Department of Religion at the newly reopened University of Lemberg. He continued to work at the university for most of his life, and was a professor of pedagogy from 1825, and a professor of theology from 1837. During his tenure, he was appointed as a canon in 1835, and as rector of the Lemberg Theological Seminary in 1837. Yakhymovych was appointed as an auxiliary bishop of the Archeparchy of Lviv by Pope Gregory XVI in July 1841 and honored with title of the former see of Pompeiopolis in Cilicia. He was consecrated on 21 November of that year by the Metropolitan of Galicia (Ruthenian Archbishop of Lemberg) Mykhaylo Levitsky in the Lviv St. George Cathedral. In his consecration participated Archbishop of Lemberg František Pištěk, Armenian Archbishop of Lemberg Samuel Cyryl Stefanowicz, Ruthenian Bishop of Premissel Ivan Snihurskyi, Bishop of Premissel Franciszek Ksawery Zachariasiewicz. Later he was appointed bishop of the Ruthenian Catholic Eparchy of Premissel, Sambir and Sanok on 5 September 1848, and consecrated on 25 March 1849.

During the revolutions of 1848, Yakhimovich was the leader of the Supreme Ruthenian Council, which supported the Ukrainian National Revival and the pro-Austrian position of the Western Ukrainian clergy, as opposed to the Western Ukrainian Russophiles. He was selected on 5 September 1859 and confirmed as the Metropolitan of Lemberg on 23 March 1860, which made him the primate of the Ukrainian Greek Catholic Church. He also served rector of the University of Lemberg from 1860 to 1861. He suddenly died in Lemberg on 29 April 1863.

== Role in the Ukrainian National Revival ==
Hryhoriy Yakhymovych was one of the leading figures of the Ukrainian National Revival in the mid 19th century. He took part in the Council of Ruthenian Scientists, and advocated for use of the Ukrainian language in schools and in churches. Yakhimovich was appointed as a deputy to the Diet of Galicia and Lodomeria, the parliament of the Kingdom of Galicia and Lodomeria. In this capacity, he defended the rights of the Ukrainian population in Galicia, promoted the Ukrainian language and the preservation of the Ukrainian Cyrillic alphabet, and also the Byzantine Rite of liturgy. In reward for his service to the Austrian Empire, he was awarded the title of Baron. He was sometimes called the "Spiritual ruler of the Ukrainian state".

== Honours and awards ==
- Commander of the Order of Leopold (Austrian Empire)

== Notes ==
Religious titles
Preceded by Mykhajlo Levitsky	Metropolitans of Galicia and Archbishop of Lemberg; 1860-1863	Succeeded by Spyrydon Lytvynovych
Preceded by Ivan Snihurskyi	Bishop of Premissel and Saanig; 1848-1860	Succeeded by Toma Polyanskyi
Preceded by Denis Auguste Affre	Titular Bishop of Pompeiopolis; 1840-1848	Succeeded by Bernard O'Reilly
Educational offices
Preceded by Andrzej Fangor	Rector of Lviv University; 1860-1861	Succeeded by Ludwik Malinowski
