= Toma Polyanskyi =

Ukrainian politician (1796–1869)

- Ukrainian Catholic Eparchy of Przemyśl, Sambir and Sanok
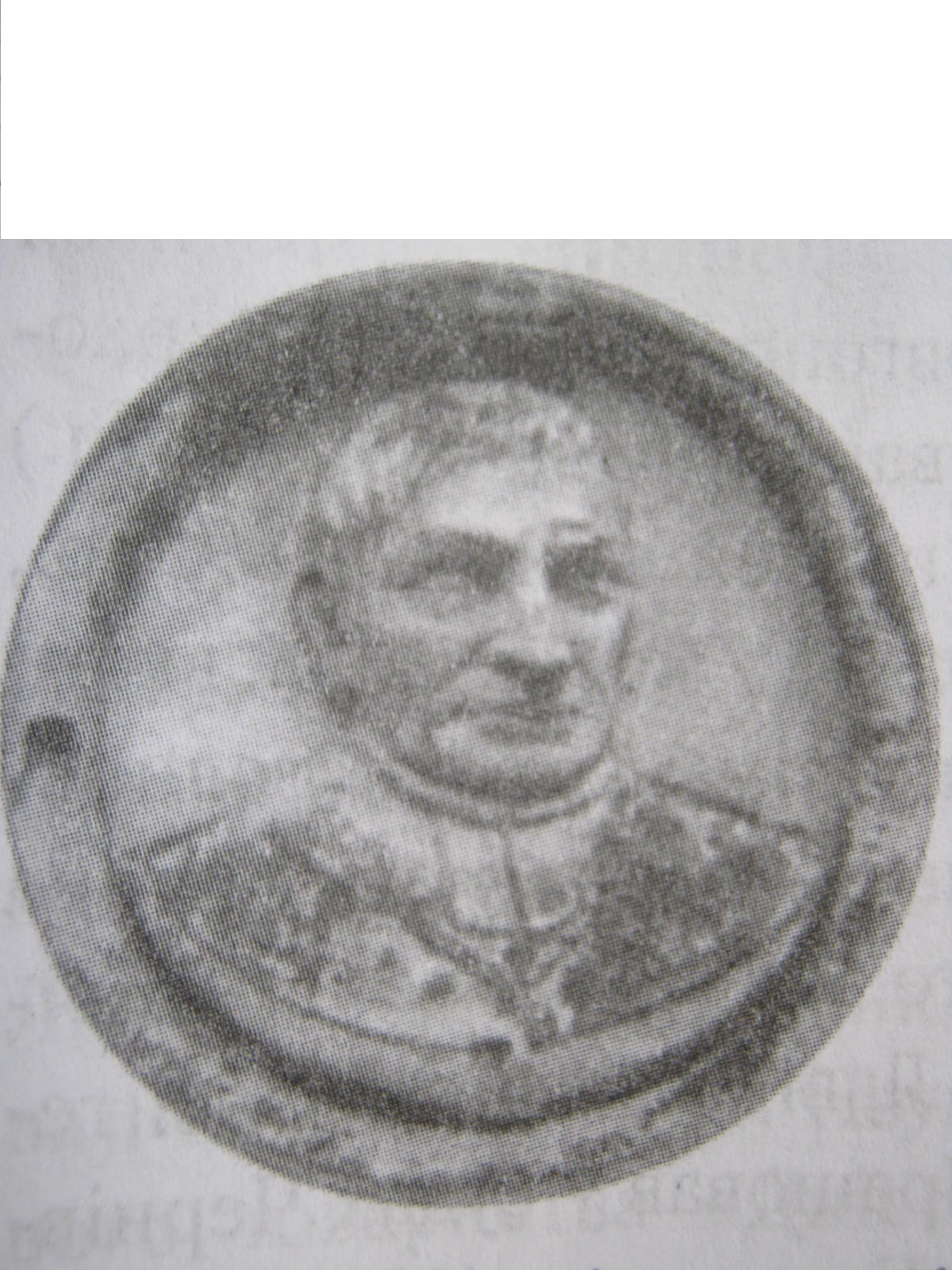
- Church: Ukrainian Greek Catholic Church
- In office: 2 December 1860 – 1 October 1867
- Predecessor: Hryhoriy Yakhymovych
- Successor: Joseph Sembratovych, as Ap. Administrator

Orders
- Ordination: 1819 (Priest) by Ivan Snihurskyi
- Consecration: 2 December 1860 (Bishop) by Hryhoriy Yakhymovych

Personal details
- Born: Toma Polyanskyi; 15 October 1796 Bartne, Habsburg monarchy
- Died: 11 November 1869 (aged 73) Przemyśl, Austria-Hungary Empire

Toma Polyanskyi (Ukrainian: Тома Полянський, Polish: Tomasz Syrus Polański; 15 October 1796 – 11 November 1869) was a Ukrainian Greek Catholic hierarch in a present-day Ukraine and Poland. He was the Eparchial Bishop of the Ukrainian Catholic Eparchy of Przemyśl, Sambir and Sanok from 1860 to 1867.

Born in Bartne, Habsburg monarchy (present day – Lesser Poland Voivodeship, Poland) in the family of Ukrainian Greek-Catholic priest Toma Sr. and his wife Kateryna (née Petrykivska) in 1796. He was ordained a priest in 1819 by Bishop Hryhoriy Yakhymovych. He worked as a Vicar General of the Ukrainian Catholic Eparchy of Przemyśl, Sambir and Sanok from 1856 to 1860.

He was confirmed by the Holy See as an Eparchial Bishop of the Ukrainian Catholic Eparchy of Przemyśl, Sambir and Sanok on 23 March 1860. He was consecrated to the Episcopate on 2 December 1860. The principal consecrator was Metropolitan Hryhoriy Yakhymovych. He resigned as Eparchial Bishop by health reasons on 1 October 1867.

He died in Przemyśl on 11 November 1869.

Catholic Church titles
Preceded by Hryhoriy Yakhymovych	Ukrainian Catholic Eparchy of Przemyśl, Sambir and Sanok; 1860–1867	Succeeded by Joseph Sembratovych, as Ap. Administrator
