= Antin Anhelovych =

Head of the Ukrainian Greek Catholic Church from 1808 to 1814

Anthony Anhelovych
- Metropolitan of Galicia, Archbishop of Lemberg
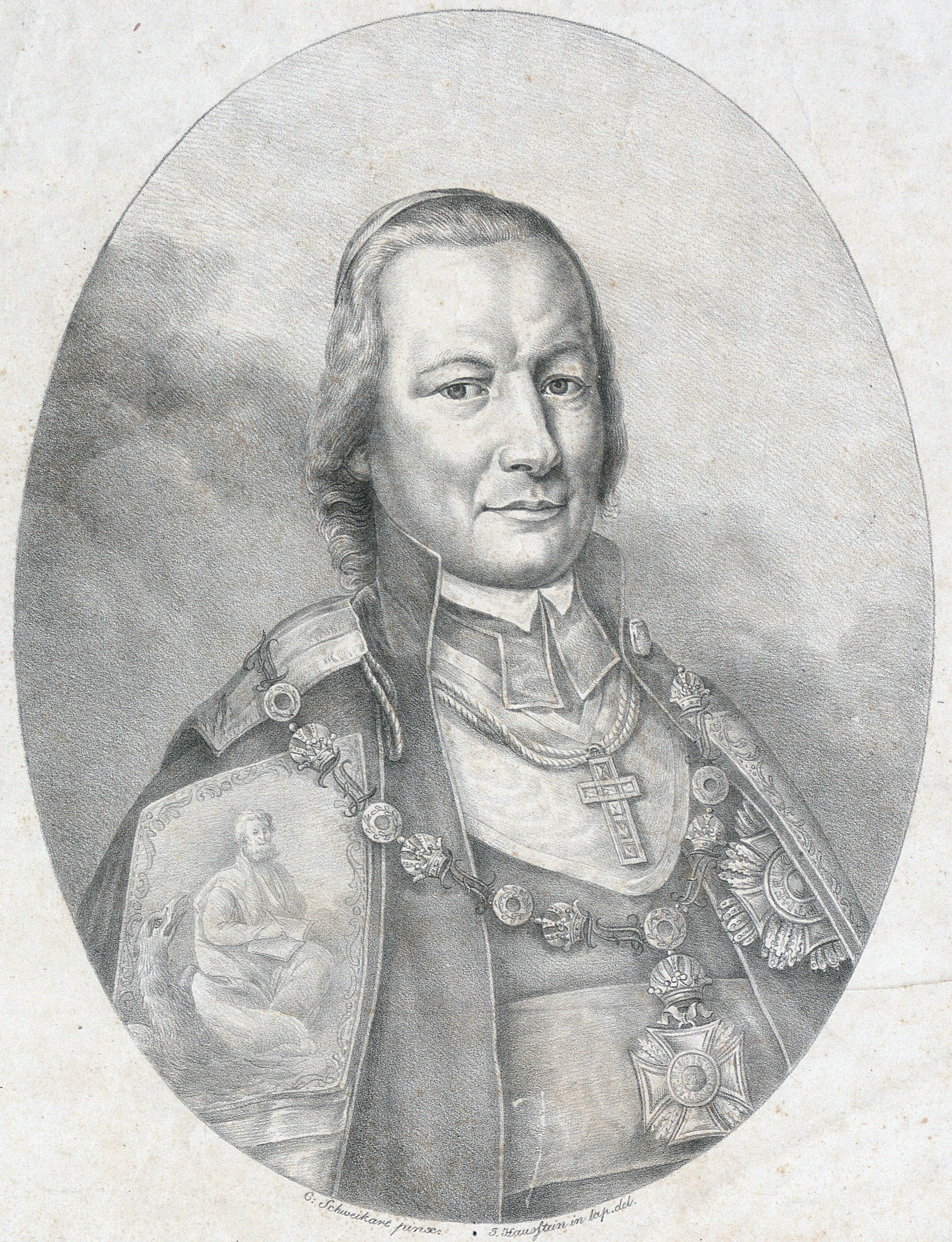
- Church: Ukrainian Greek Catholic Church
- Appointed: 16 March 1808
- Installed: 25 September 1808
- Term ended: 9 August 1814
- Successor: Michael Levytsky

Orders
- Consecration: 14 Feb 1796 (Bishop) by Porfyriy Skarbek-Vazhynskyi

Personal details
- Born: 14 April 1756 Hryniv, Ruthenian Voivodeship, Polish–Lithuanian Commonwealth
- Died: 9 August 1814 (aged 58) Lemberg, Kingdom of Galicia and Lodomeria, Austrian Empire
- Coat of arms

Anthony Anhelovych (Angelovich, Ukrainian: Антін Ангелович, Polish: Antoni Angełłowicz; 14 April 1756 – 9 August 1814) was the first Metropolitan Archbishop of the re-built Metropolitan of Lviv from 1808 until his death in 1814.

== Life ==
Antin Anhelovych was born on 14 April 1756 in Hryniv, near Bibrka, now in Ukraine. He studied at the Barbareum (a Greek Catholic college in Vienna) and in 1793 he became the first rector of the Greek Catholic Theological Seminary in Lviv. In 1794 he became professor of dogma and in 1796 rector of University of Lviv.

In 1795 he was appointed eparch of Eparchy of Przemyśl and so consecrated a bishop on 14 February 1796. by Bishop Porfyriy Skarbek-Vazhynskyi of Chełm. In 1798 he was appointed administrator of the Lviv eparchy, in 1804 administrator of the Chełm eparchy, and in 1805 administrator of both the Lviv and Kholm eparchies.

By 1805, the "Metropolis of Kiev, Galicia and all Ruthenia" was effectively dissolved. In its place, Emperor Francis I of Austria decided to re-establish a Galician metropolis in the western part of the Kingdom of Galicia and Lodomeria on 11 September 1806. In this way these territories were split from the jurisdiction of the main Metropolis of Kyiv of Ukrainian Greek Catholic Church, which was suffering under the Russian Empire (actually in 1839 the Greek-Catholic church was dissolved in the Russian Empire, and all its property was transferred to the Orthodox state church).

Pope Pius VII approved this split on 24 February 1807 elevating the Eparchy of Lviv to the rank of Metropolis and granting it the same rights of the Metropolis of Kyiv. On 16 March 1808 Angelovych was appointed the first Greek-Catholic Metropolitan in Lviv. The enthronement occurred on 25 September 1808. Antin Anhelovych died in Lviv on 9 August 1814.

Religious titles
Preceded by Theodosius Rostocki as Metropolitan of Kyiv, Halych and all Ruthenia	Metropolitan of Galicia and Archbishop of Lemberg; 1808—1814	Succeeded by Mykhajlo Levitsky
Preceded by Mykola Skorodynskyi as Bishop of Lemberg and Kamenez	Metropolitan of Galicia and Archbishop of Lemberg; 1808—1814	Succeeded by Mykhajlo Levitsky
Preceded by Porfyriy Vazhyskyi	Bishop of Chelm and Belz (as administrator); 1804–1810	Succeeded by Ferdynand Tsikhanovskyi
Preceded by Petro Bilyanskyi as Administrator of the Eparchy	Bishop of Premissel and Saanig; 1796–1813	Succeeded by Mykhajlo Levitsky
Educational offices
Preceded by Jan Holfeld	Rector of Lviv University; 1796—1797	Succeeded by Stanisław Orzębski
