= Sylwester Sembratowicz =

Head of the Ukrainian Greek Catholic Church from 1885 to 1898

His Eminence Sylwester Sembratowicz
- Metropolitan of Galicia, Archbishop of Lemberg
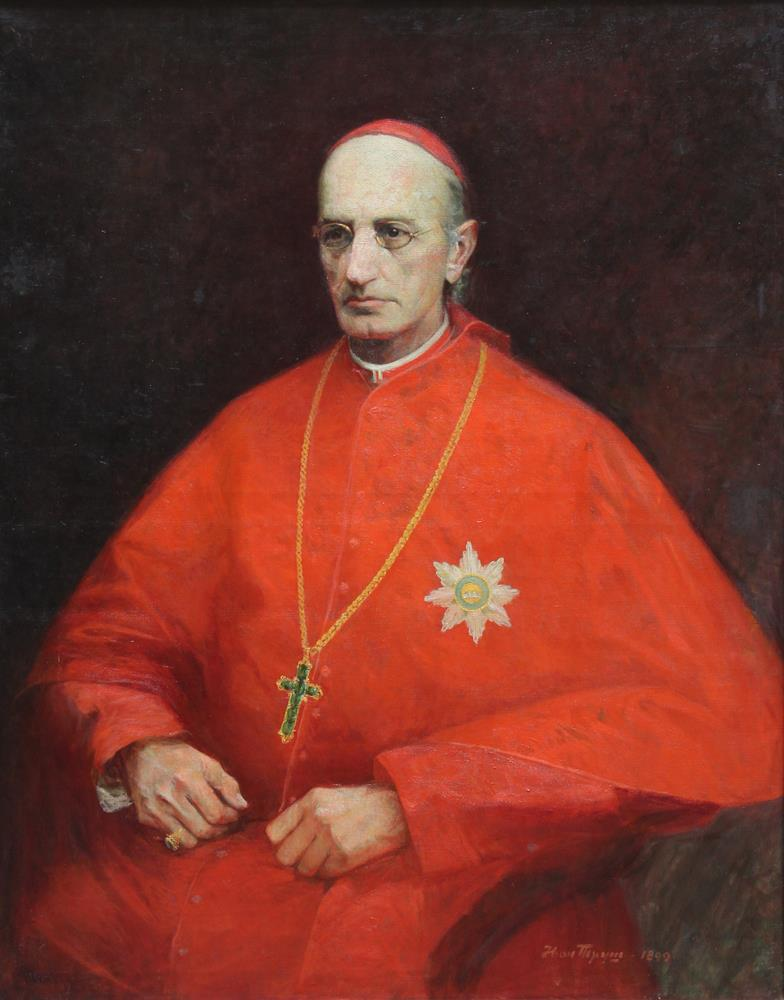
- Church: Ukrainian Greek Catholic Church
- Appointed: 27 March 1885
- Installed: 5 May 1885
- Term ended: 4 August 1898
- Predecessor: Joseph Sembratovych
- Successor: Julian Sas-Kuilovsky

Orders
- Ordination: 1 November 1860 (Priest)
- Consecration: 20 April 1879 (Bishop) by Joseph Sembratovych
- Created cardinal: 29 November 1895 by Pope Leo XIII
- Rank: Cardinal-Priest of Santo Stefano al Monte Celio

Personal details
- Born: 3 September 1836 Desznica, Kingdom of Galicia and Lodomeria, Austrian Empire
- Died: 4 August 1898 (aged 61) Lemberg, Kingdom of Galicia and Lodomeria, Austria-Hungary

Sylwester Sembratowicz (Ukrainian: Sylvester Sembratovych/Сильвестр Сембратович; 3 September 1836 – 4 August 1898) was the Metropolitan Archbishop of the Ukrainian Greek Catholic Church from 1885 until his death in 1898 and a Cardinal of the Catholic Church.

== Life ==
Sylwester Sembratowicz was born on 3 September 1836, in the village of Desznica, in south-eastern Poland. He studied in Vienna and in Lviv. From 1854 he moved for the academic studies in the Greek College of St. Athanasius, Rome, where he was ordained as a priest on 1 November 1860 and he obtained a doctorate in theology in 1861. He remained in Rome until 1863 when he returned to Galicia and was appointed to serve in the village of Tylicz. He worked also in Greek-Ruthenian Seminary of Lviv until 1865, when he was appointed professor of theology in the University of Lviv, an assignment he kept till 1879.

On 20 April 1879 he was consecrated auxiliary bishop of the Archeparchy of Lviv by his uncle, the Archbishop of Lviv Joseph Sembratowicz. When his uncle resigned in 1882, Sylwester Sembratowicz was appointed apostolic administrator. On 27 March 1885 he was formally appointed Archbishop of Lviv, i.e. the primate of the Ukrainian Greek Catholic Church, and he was enthroned on 5 May 1885. As Primate, he reformed the Basilian Monastic Order, published vernacular prayer books and held a synod in 1891.

In June 1893 he was attacked in Lviv by a mob of students who were protesting his visit with the Pope. Sylwester Sembratowicz and another bishop were both injured, and the attack resulted in 19 arrests.

On 29 November 1895 he was created cardinal priest by Pope Leo XIII and he was assigned the titular church of Santo Stefano al Monte Celio on 25 June 1896. He died in Lviv on 4 August 1898.

== Notes ==
Religious titles
Preceded by Joseph Sembratovych	Metropolitans of Galicia and Archbishop of Lemberg (as apostolic administrator since 1882); 1885—1898	Succeeded by Julian Sas-Kuilovsky
Catholic Church titles
Preceded by Paul Melchers	Cardinal Priest of Santo Stefano al Monte Celio; 25 June 1896 – 4 August 1898	Succeeded by Jakob Missia
