= Desznica =

- Village
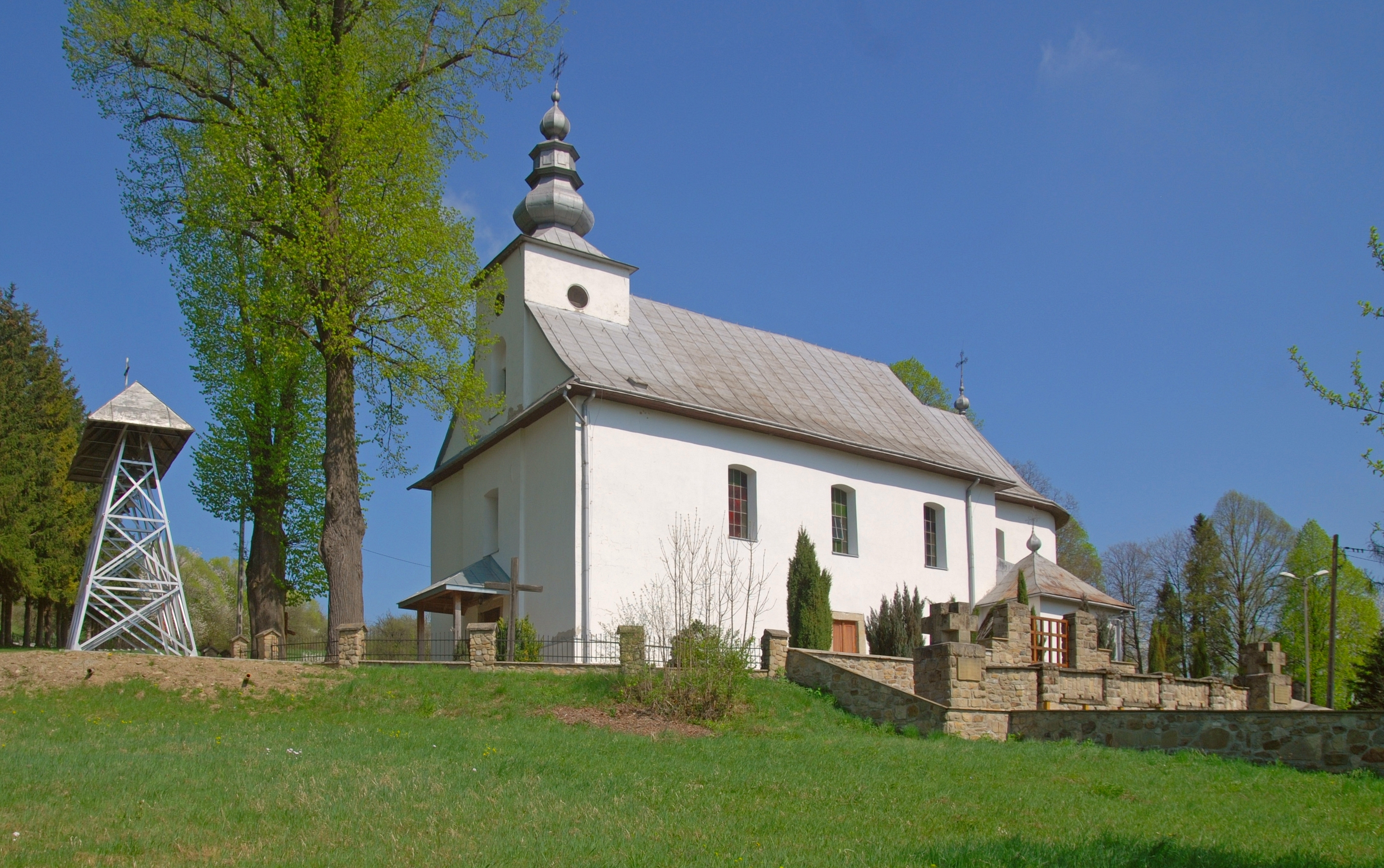
- Church of the Immaculate Conception

- Location within Poland
- Coordinates: 49°34′N 21°29′E
- Country: Poland
- Voivodeship: Subcarpathian
- County: Jasło
- Gmina: Nowy Żmigród

Desznica [dɛʂˈɲit͡sa] (Rusyn: Дошниця, Doshnytsia) is a village in the administrative district of Gmina Nowy Żmigród, within Jasło County, Subcarpathian Voivodeship, in south-eastern Poland.
