= Jan Martyniak =

Ukrainian former Greek Catholic archbishop

- Archbishop-Metropolitan of Ukrainian Catholic Archeparchy of Przemyśl–Warsaw
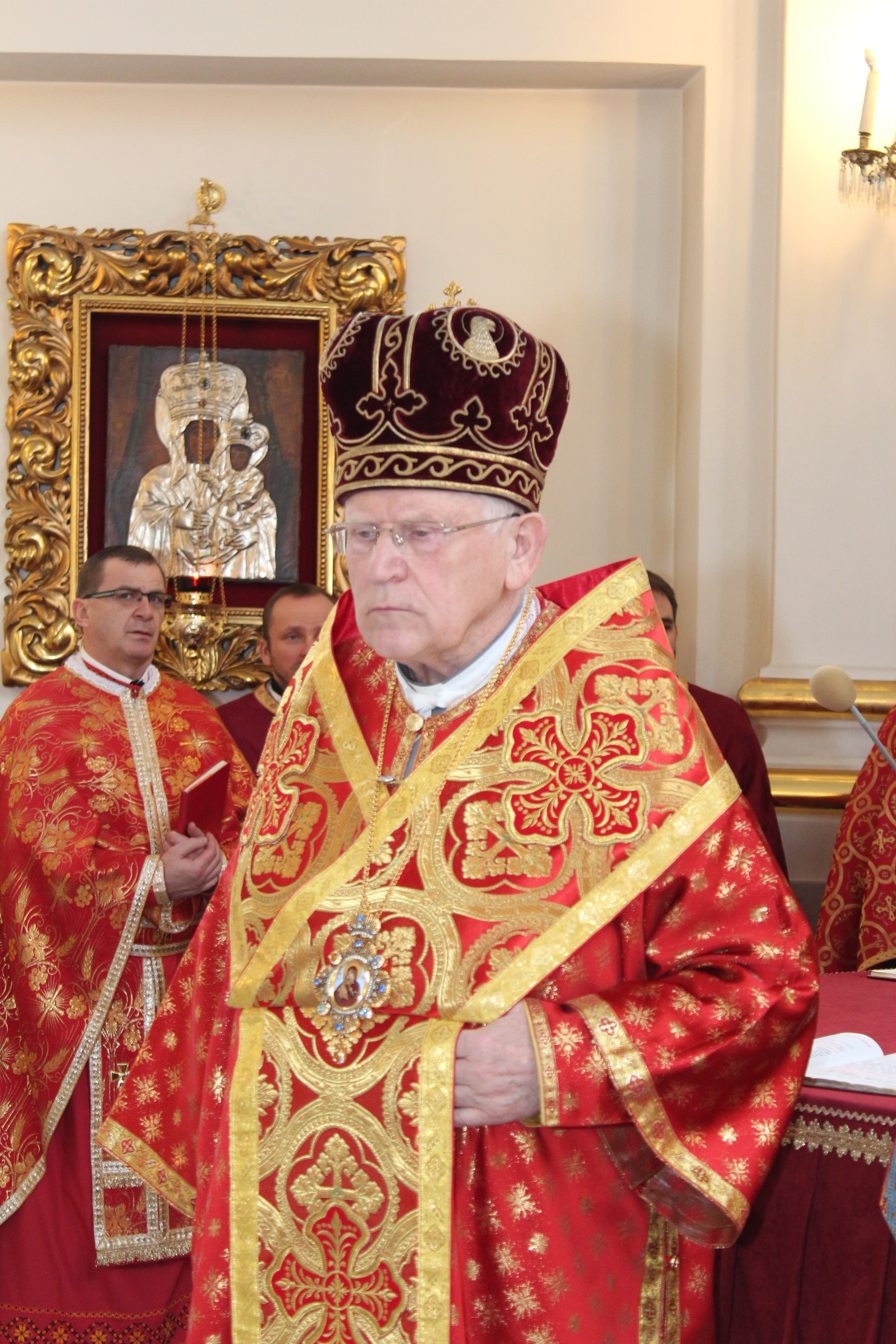
- Martyniak in 2015
- Church: Ukrainian Greek Catholic Church
- Appointed: 20 July 1989
- Predecessor: Ivan Choma
- Successor: Eugeniusz Popowicz

Orders
- Ordination: 29 June 1964 (Priest) by Bolesław Kominek
- Consecration: 16 September 1989 (Bishop) by Myroslav Ivan Lubachivsky

Personal details
- Born: Jan Martyniak; 20 June 1939 (age 86) Spas, Lwów Voivodeship, Poland

Coat of arms of Jan Martyniak

Jan Martyniak (born on 20 June 1939, Poland) was a former archbishop and Metropolitan of the Ukrainian Catholic Archeparchy of Przemyśl–Warsaw in Poland on its establishment on 24 May 1996 and was previously archbishop of the Eparchy of Przemyśl, recreated after the fall of communism in 1991.

== Biography ==
Jan Martyniak was born in Spas near Staryi Sambir Raion from Vasyl and Maria Zygmunts, a farming family. His baptism and Confirmation was received on 24 June 1939 in the Greek Catholic church in Terszowie. Years were spent in a Spas, where the religious life of the inhabitants of dominant influence was the famous monastery of St. Onofriy Basilian Fathers in nearby Ławrowie. The father of the future Metropolitan was drafted during World War II by the Soviet Army and was killed in a German POW camp near Dresden.

In 1946, along with his mother and brothers he was forced to leave their homeland in the deportation action. His family settled in a village in the district of New Waliszów in Lower Silesia. He completed his primary education in 1954, then High School in Bystrica, obtaining a matriculation certificate in 1958. Wishing to devote himself to the clerical state, Martyniak studied theology at the Seminary in Wroclaw and graduated in 1964, receiving his priestly ordination by Archbishop Boleslaw Kominek's hands. He worked as a curate in the parish of the Roman Catholic Church of Guardian Angels in Walbrzych (1964). After a year of pastoral work aimed to study in Italy, Polish authorities refused to issue him a passport. In this situation, he began his studies in the field of apologetics at Theological Catholic Academy in Warsaw. Martyniak later deepened their knowledge of the Institute of Primate of the Inner life.

In the years 1969–70 Martyniak was an assistant at the Major Seminary in Wroclaw, and in 1973 he took up lecturing in Gorzow branch of the Catholic Theological Academy. In 1974 he became pastoral outpost of the Greek Catholic Church in Legnica. Soon, he became dean.

On 22 December 1981 Polish Primate Jozef Glemp gave him the job of vicar general of the faithful of the Byzantine-Ukrainian rite for the Southern Vicariate. On 20 July 1989 Vardimissany appointed titular bishop and auxiliary bishop of the Polish primate, the Ordinary for the faithful of the Eastern rites in Poland by Pope John Paul II. On 16 September 1989 he was ordained bishop of Jasna Gora.

On 16 January 1991 marked the Ordinary reactivated after 45 years of the Diocese of Przemysl of the Byzantine-Ukrainian rite of the Holy See.

On 31 May 1996 Martyniak was appointed Archbishop and Metropolitan of the Uniate metropolitan formed Przemysl-Warsaw Ukrainian Greek Catholic church by Pope John Paul II. He was enthroned eparch on the Cathedral of St. John the Baptist in Przemysl was held on 17 August 1996.

In 2005 he was awarded the Knight's Cross of the Order of Polish Rebirth in 2007 - the Order of Prince Yaroslav the Wise V Class.

== Notes ==
1. Указ Президента України № 739/2007 (in Ukrainian). president.gov.ua. [Access 13 April 2011].
