= Ukrainian Catholic Major Archeparchy of Kyiv–Galicia =

Major archeparchy of the Ukrainian Greek Catholic Church

Major Archeparchy of Kyiv–Galicia Archieparchia Kioviensis–Haliciensis Ucrainorum Kyiv-Halych

Location
- Country: Ukraine
- Headquarters: Kyiv, Ukraine

Information
- Denomination: Catholic Church
- Sui iuris church: Ukrainian Greek Catholic
- Rite: Byzantine Rite
- Established: 1808 (as Metropolitan of Galicia and Archbishop of Lemberg)
- Cathedral: Cathedral of the Resurrection of Christ, Kyiv

Current leadership
- Pope: Leo XIV
- Archbishop: Sviatoslav Shevchuk
- Metropolitan Archbishop: Sviatoslav Shevchuk

The Major Archeparchy of Kyiv–Galicia (Kyiv–Halych) (Note: Kiev–Halych or Kyiv–Halychyna are variant spellings. The name "Galicia" is a Latinized form of Halych, one of several regional principalities of the medieval state of Kievan Rus'.) is a Ukrainian Greek Catholic Major Archeparchy of the Catholic Church, that is located in Ukraine. It was erected on 21 August 2005 with the approval of Pope Benedict XVI. There are other territories of the Church that are not located in Ukraine. The cathedral church — the Cathedral of the Resurrection of Christ — is situated in the city of Kyiv. The metropolitan bishop is — ex officio — the Primate of the Ukrainian Greek Catholic Church. The incumbent major archbishop is Sviatoslav Shevchuk.

== History ==
=== In the Patriarchate of Constantinople ===
The ecclesiastical province dates back to 988 AD when a metropolis was established by the Ecumenical Patriarch of Constantinople after the conversion of the Grand Prince of Kiev — Vladimir the Great. The Mongol invasion of Europe devastated Kievan Rus' during the 13th century. A second metropolis for the south-western parts of Rus' — the Metropolis of Halych — was established in 1303 with its episcopal seat in the city of Halych. This was proposed by King Leo I of Galicia and came to fruition during the reign of his son George. It existed during most of the 14th century but remained vacant since 1401 as the Metropolitan of Kyiv took over the title.

=== Rivalry between Constantinople, Moscow and Rome ===
During the 15th century, the metropolitans worked for Christian unity with the Patriarch of Constantinople. The first such attempt was in 1439 with the Union of Florence. With the Fall of Constantinople, the union fell asunder. A second attempt at union was essayed in 1596. It resulted in the Union of Brest which re-established full communion with the Holy See. Some clergy refused to subscribe to the articles of union and continued with the old rites and their allegiance to the Ecumenical Patriarch. More than 25 years of struggles within parishes for possession of church buildings and monasteries ensued. In 1620, the patriarch of Jerusalem — Theophanes III — established an "Exarchate of Ukraine" for those dissenting clergy and laity who refused to conform to the union. Parallel successions to the title of "Metropolitan of Kiev, Galicia and all Ruthenia" continued until 1686. In that year, the Patriarchate of Moscow uncanonically assumed the right to consecrate the Kiev metropolitans; from that time onwards, the metropolis became a creature of Moscow.

=== Following the Partitions of Poland ===
The Ruthenian Uniate Church (Greek Catholic) continued the succession of metropolitans in the lands of the Polish–Lithuanian Commonwealth. Today, these lands are mainly found in the modern states of Ukraine, Poland, and Belarus. Following the partitions of the Polish-Lithuanian Commonwealth (1772–1775), most of the Ruthenian lands came under the control of the Russian Empire. Freedom of religion was not permitted in those lands. Consequently, by the Synod of Polotsk of 1839 (when all the Greek Catholic Bishops joined the Russian Orthodox Church) the Greek Catholic Church had been thoroughly suppressed. Church temporalities were seized by the Orthodox Most Holy Synod. In the lands that came under the control of the Habsburgs (later the Austrian Empire), the Church survived. The Habsburg monarchy reorganized their annexed territories as the Kingdom of Galicia and Lodomeria. The Eparchy of Lviv in the kingdom was raised to the status of an archeparchy or metropolis. Its bishop became a metropolitan bishop who governed the suffragan eparchies. All primates were approved by the Pope. The new metropolis received the name "Metropolis of Galicia" in memory of the 14th century metropolis. In 1807, Pope Pius VII authorised the metropolitan to administer the vacant see of Kiev on the basis of the Eparchy of Lviv.

=== The Metropolis under the Soviet Union ===
In 1939, the Metropolis of Galicia came under Soviet rule. In 1946, the Church structure was forcefully subjected to the Russian Orthodox Church. Church members however, continued to practice their faith in secret. The metropolitan resided in Rome during the period of the Iron Curtain. In 1963, Pope Paul VI raised the metropolitan to the newly created rank of Major Archbishop, with rights equivalent to those of a Patriarch. The position was not so named however, in order not to provoke a new wave of repressions against the Catacomb Church in Ukraine and to avoid hampering ecumenical dialogue with the Patriarch of Constantinople.

=== The Metropolis in independent Ukraine ===
Following the collapse of Soviet Union, the Major Archbishop returned to his archepiscopal see in Lviv. In June 2001, the Church enjoyed a visit from Pope John Paul II. On 25 November 1995, the Archiepiscopal Exarchate of Kyiv-Vyshhorod was created under the jurisdiction of the Archeparchy of Lviv. Originally, it covered all central, eastern and southern parts of Ukraine. Later (2002-2003), it lost territory to form new exarchates for the eastern region (the Exarchate of Donets’k–Kharkiv) and the southern region (the Exarchate of Odesa). On 6 December 2004, the remaining central region of the Exarchate was transformed into the Archeparchy of Kyiv. Since the "Synod of Polotsk" in 1838, Kyiv had been deprived of its own see. At the same time, an ecclesiastical province ("major archeparchy") was erected. The Archeparchy of Kyiv became the principal see of the newly created Major Archeparchy of Kyiv-Halych, and thus a primatial see of the Ukrainian Greek Catholic Church. The episcopal seat of the "Metropolis of Galicia" was transferred from St. George's Cathedral in the city of Lviv to the Cathedral of the Resurrection of Christ in the capital city of Ukraine — Kyiv. The title of the suppressed Ukrainian Catholic Eparchy of Kamyanets was united with it on 6 December 2004. On 21 November 2011, the Major Archeparchy lost three suffragan sees: Buchach (Bučač) and Kolomyia–Chernivtsi and Kamyanets; as a result, the Archeparchy of Kyiv is the sole territory of the Major Archeparchy of Kyiv-Halych.

== List of primates ==
=== Metropolitans of Galicia and Archbishop of Lemberg ===
- Antin II (1808—1814)
- Mykhailo II (1816—1858), also served as a Primate of Galicia and Lodomeria; elevated to cardinal in 1856
- Hryhoriy II (1859—1866)
- Spyrydon (1866—1869)
- Josyf II (1870—1882)
- Sylvester (1882—1898), elevated to cardinal in 1895
- Julian (1899-1900)
- Andrei (1900—1944)
- leading bishop Josyf Slipyj (1944-1945) In 1945, as the leading bishop of the Greek Catholic Church, he was arrested by the Soviet authorities. Following the Lviv Council (1946), the Greek Catholic Church was forcibly abolished on the territory of the Soviet Union, and its property and clergy transferred to the Russian Orthodox Church.

=== Metropolitans of Galicia and Major Archbishops of Lviv ===
- Josyf III (1963–1984, in exile) In 1963, he was elevated to the rank of Major archbishop. With fall of the Soviet Union in 1989, the Metropolis of Galicia was revived. Elevated to cardinal in 1965
- Myroslav (1984–14 December 2000). elevated to cardinal in 1985
- Lubomyr Husar (January 2001 – 21 August 2005), elevated to cardinal in 2001

=== Major Archbishops of Kyiv-Galicia ===
In 2005, the Exarchate of Kyiv-Galicia was transformed into a diocese and converted into an archdiocese. The new archdiocese was also turned into the Major Archbishop's see and reinstating the Kyiv see since the 1838 Synod of Polotsk.

- Lubomyr Husar (21 August 2005–10 February 2011), elevated to cardinal in 2001
- Sviatoslav Shevchuk (March 2011–incumbent) He was auxiliary bishop of the Major Archeparchy of Lviv during 1996–2000 and was apostolic administrator in 2000 until his appointment as Major Archbishop in 2011.
