= Dominik Radziwiłł =

Dominik Radziwiłł may refer to:

- Dominik Mikołaj Radziwiłł (1643–1697), Polish nobleman and politician
- Dominik Hieronim Radziwiłł (1786–1813), Polish nobleman and colonel in the Polish Army
- Dominik Rainer Radziwiłł (1911–1976), Polish military officer and husband of Princess Eugénie of Greece and Denmark
