= Jan Henryk Wołodkowicz =

Polish noble and general

- Jan Henryk Wołodkowicz
- Born: 17 September 1765; Sienna, Nowogródek Voivodeship, Grand Duchy of Lithuania
- Died: 6 August 1825 (aged 59); Saint Petersburg, Russian Empire
- Burial place: Smolensk
- Spouse(s): Anna Małgorzata Fergusson-Tepper (m. 1792; div. 1804) Marie-Thérèse Lasseray (m. 1804)
- Children: 2
- Military career
- Allegiance: Poland–Lithuania; French First Republic; First French Empire
- Branch: Cavalry
- Service years: 1789–1815
- Rank: Général de brigade
- Nickname: Henry / Henri le Beau
- Conflicts: Kościuszko Uprising; French Revolutionary Wars; Napoleonic Wars
- Awards: Order of Saint Stanislaus

Jan Chrzciciel Henryk Witold Wołodkowicz (French: Vitold Jean Henri de Wolodkowicz, 17 September 1765 – 6 August 1825) was a Polish-Lithuanian nobleman from the Wołodkowicz family (Radwan coat of arms) who became a general in the French army, where he was known as General Henry. Initially, he served as a cavalry captain in the Grand Ducal Lithuanian Army from 1789 to 1794. He joined the French Revolutionary Army in 1796 and rose to the rank of général de brigade, which he held in the Grande Armée. He was also one of Napoleon's Aide-de-camp.

== Early life ==
Jan Henryk Wołodkowicz was born in Sienna in the Nowogródek Voivodeship. He was the son of Józef Wołodkowicz (born in 1730), stolnik of Minsk, and Regina née Broniec. Following the family's tradition, he entered public office: by February 1789 he was land judge of Minsk, although another document describes him as court chamberlain of Lithuania in 1790.

== Lithuanian army and Kościuszko Uprising ==
During the Great Sejm, in October 1788, the combined size of the Polish and Lithuanian armies was increased to 100,000. This increase included the target number of 10,650 for Lithuanian cavalry. The expansion of the military meant the nobility's sons had a greater chance of a military career, so Wołodkowicz also pursued it. On 3 March 1789, he received a captain's commission in the 4th Banner of the 1st Lithuanian National Cavalry Brigade. For unknown reasons, he left it around mid-September 1791, but the following year in the War of 1792, he was again among the brigade's captains. It is unknown whether he took part in the Battle of Mir, and it seems unlikely, since he married only a few days later.

Through this marriage to Anna Małgorzata Fergusson-Tepper, a wealthy Warsaw banker's daughter, on 29 June 1792, he increased his fortune to 150,000 Polish złoty. On 21 November 1793, he was probably awarded the Order of Saint Stanislaus by Stanisław August Poniatowski, but as the king by then had joined the Targowica Confederation, this award was a dubious honour at that time.

Regardless, Wołodkowicz joined the ranks of the rebels in the Kościuszko Uprising. At the turn of May and June 1794, being trusted by the Lithuanian insurrectional authorities, still with a captain's rank in the 1st Lithuanian National Cavalry Brigade, he carried out reconnaissance on the strategically important Vilnius-Minsk route, mainly in the vicinity of Oszmiana. He led a regular cavalry unit of about 100 cavalrymen, at the head of which (or a patrol separated from it) he skirmished with a Cossack unit from General Bennigsen's group. The clash ended with a small success for the Russians, with minimal Lithuanian losses.

Before 1795, he was a member of the Masonic lodge Świątynia Izis (Temple of Isis).

== French Revolutionary Wars ==
After the fall of the Kościuszko Uprising, Wołodkowicz emigrated to France. In early 1796, he joined the French Revolutionary Army as a volunteer and was attached to the Army of Italy. General Championnet took him onto his staff. In early 1799, after the French capture of Naples, Championnet promoted him provisionally to général de brigade, without his passing through the lower officer ranks. French officers found his name hard to pronounce, so he used the name “Henry”, which became his official name in the French army. Napoleon reportedly came to call him "Henri le Beau" ("Henri the Handsome"), supposedly because of his striking appearance.

On 6 October 1799, he took command of a French cavalry brigade, and in November he was seriously wounded leading it against the Austrians at Breo Longo in Piedmont. In August 1800, he was given a brigade made up of the 9th and 21st Chasseurs à cheval Regiment, and he commanded the cavalry of the army’s left wing.

On 9 August 1801, he was made a reformed officer. He was a radical republican and distrustful of Napoleon. According to Józef Załuski, he refused the Légion d'honneur around the time Napoleon became Emperor and the historian Tadeusz Jeziorowski states he declined nomination as commandant of the order.

== Napoleonic Wars ==
Jan Henryk Wołodkowicz

On 23 September 1806, Napoleon appointed Wołodkowicz to command the newly created 2nd Legion of the North. He was short of officers and equipment, and the legion was merged into the 1st Legion by December.

From 27 March 1807 he led a cavalry detachment against Ferdinand von Schill’s Prussian partisans in Pomerania, driving them out of Lauenburg, Stolp and Schlawe. On 21 June 1807, at Rössel, he was given command of the 3rd Brigade of General Zajączek’s Corps of Observation.

On 17 September 1807, Marshal Berthier ordered his transfer to the army of the Duchy of Warsaw. Wołodkowicz, considering himself a French general, protested, with Marshal Davout’s support. He never actually served in the Duchy’s army.

In 1809, during the War of the Fifth Coalition, he served as a general in the French Army.

He spent the years from 1812 to 1814 or 1815 in Russian captivity. According to Arkadiusz Malejka, he was arrested in spring 1812, before the French invasion, because of his intelligence work, deported to Smolensk and interned at Tambov. Other sources state that he was taken prisoner and deported to Siberia by the Russians during the battle of Smolensk. He was one of the last generals of the Grande Armée to be released.

== Later life and death ==
Wołodkowicz was released from internment in 1814 or 1815. According to the historian Adam Skałkowski, on 29 March 1815, during the Hundred Days, Napoleon confirmed his rank of brigadier general under the restored title of maréchal de camp.

He spent the last years of his life trying to recover his estates of Sienna, Mielachowicze and Budrykowszczyzna in the Nowogródek region, which the Russian government had confiscated.

He died in Saint Petersburg on 6 August 1825, while still pursuing these claims, and was buried in Smolensk. His descendants continued to pursue claims to family property until the beginning of the 20th century.

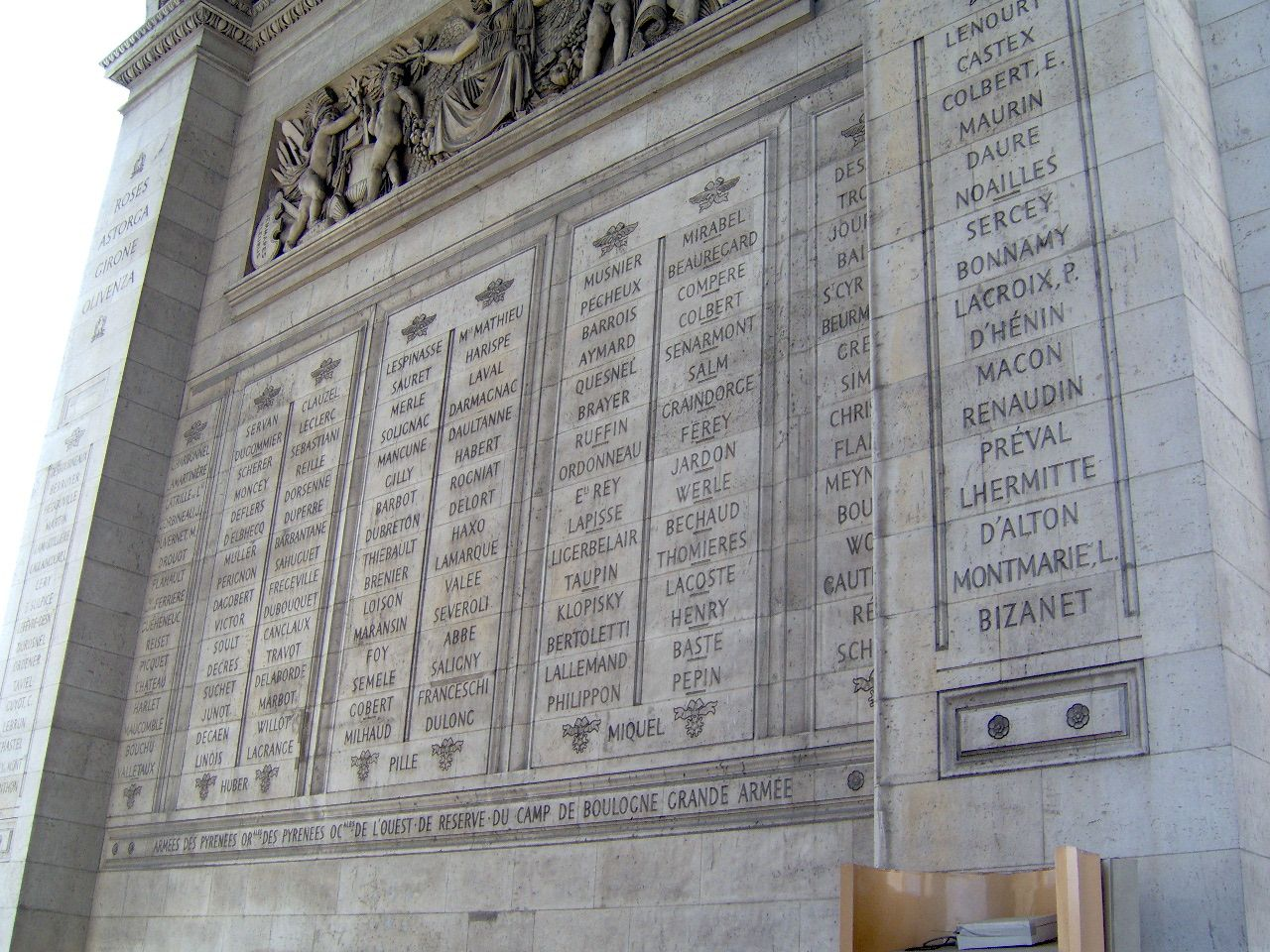
West Pillar of the Arc de Triomphe

The inscription "HENRY" appears on the western pillar of the Arc de Triomphe. Family tradition holds that this refers to Jan Henryk, who carried the name "Henry" throughout the Italian campaign and was referred to as "General Henry" in official French correspondence, this Gallicised name being recorded as such in French army rolls. The inscription has also been attributed to Colonel Claude François Henry. The Wołodkowicz family petitioned the French government several times to correct the inscription to "Wołodkowicz". The government declined each time, arguing that a historic monument could not be altered. The commission never published a definitive identification of the persons intended.

== Personal life ==
Marie Thérèse, née Lasseray (1774–1860)

On 29 June 1792, Wołodkowicz married Anna Małgorzata Fergusson-Tepper, daughter of the wealthy Warsaw banker Piotr Fergusson-Tepper. They were formally divorced in 1804.

They had one son, Józef (Joseph). In 1812, he became a second lieutenant and aide-de-camp to General Józef Zajączek, serving with him in the Russian campaign. At the Berezina he dragged the wounded Zajączek out of the line of fire. He was made a knight of the Légion d’honneur in October 1812, fell ill and died at Vilnius in early 1813.

In May 1804, at Versailles, Wołodkowicz married Marie-Thérèse Lasseray (1774-1860), daughter of the Paris merchant Jacques-Ambroise Lasseray.

Their only son, Alexandre Henri (Aleksander Henryk) Wołodkowicz, was born in Paris in August 1805. He made his career in the French finance administration. He served in Algeria from 1836 and was receveur général des finances in Eure-et-Loir and then in the Vosges between 1844 and 1851. In 1842, he was made a knight of the Légion d’honneur. Alexandre Henri married Camille Lafonta, daughter of an aide-de-camp of King Louis-Philippe, and they had one daughter, Marie-Thérèse. He died in Paris on 2 April 1875.

== Sources ==
- Judycki, Zbigniew; Judycki, Maksymilian (2021). Polacy w Armii Napoleona - Słownik Biograficzny Dowódców (PDF). Warsaw. ISBN 978-83-66640-51-1.
