= Northern Legions =

- Legie Północne (Polish); Légions du Nord (French)
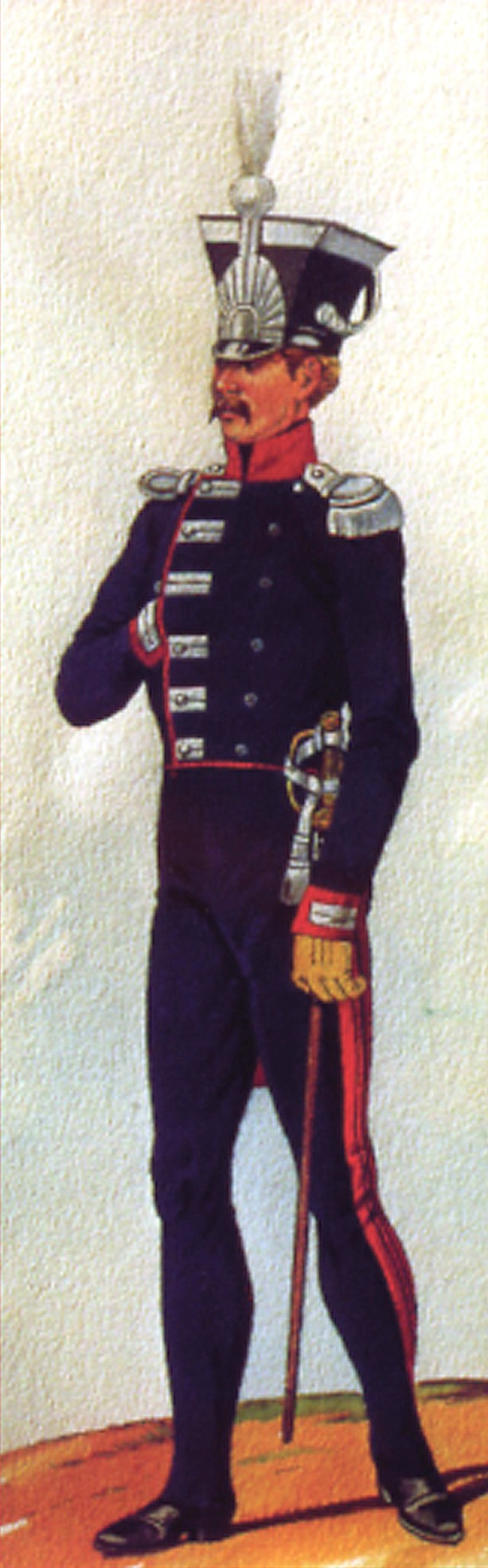
- An officer of the Northern Legion
- Active: 1806–1808
- Disbanded: 1808
- Country: First French Empire
- Type: infantry, cavalry
- Size: 1,200 soldiers (1807)
- Engagements: War of the Fourth Coalition

Commanders
- Notable commanders: Józef Zajączek; Jan Henryk Wołodkowicz; Michał Gedeon Radziwiłł; Maciej Sobolewski

The Northern Legions (Polish: Legie Północne; French: Légions du Nord) were infantry and cavalry units of the Polish Legions, during the campaign of the War of the Fourth Coalition fought against the Kingdom of Prussia. It consisted of Polish soldiers, mostly originating as the deserters from the Royal Prussian Army. Two legions were founded on 20 September 1806, and were eventually incorporated into a singular formation on 20 March 1807. It was eventually disbanded in 1808, and incorporated into the 2nd Legion of the Army of the Duchy of Warsaw.

== History ==
The Northern Legions were established under decrees issued by Napoleon Bonaparte on 20 September 1806, during the War of the Fourth Coalition against the Kingdom of Prussia. They utilised Polish soldiers that had deserted from the Royal Prussian Army.

Two legions were formed. The first was commanded by general Józef Zajączek, and consisted of four battalions. The second was called up on 23 September, with general Jan Henryk Wołodkowicz in its command. Each legion was envisioned to eventually reach 5,000 soldiers, thought this was never achieved. The 1st Northern Legion was sent to Szczecin as part of general Jean-François Xavier de Ménard's division. The 2nd Northern Legion in March 1807 was incorporated into the 1st Northern Legion. It new commanders became were Michał Gedeon Radziwiłł and Maciej Sobolewski. The legion was formed in Landau, and on 20 November, it had about 1,200 soldiers. On 24 November, it set off for the front. It took part in battles in Pomerania, and distinguished itself in the campaigns near Tczew and Gdańsk, and performed garrison duty in the Vistula Mouth Fortress.

As a result of the strong demands of the soldiers, in 1808 the Northern Legion became part of the Army of the Duchy of Warsaw, and was transformed into the 5th and 6th infantry regiments of the 2nd Legion of the Duchy of Warsaw under General Józef Zajączek.
