= Ludwig-Wilhelm Tepper de Ferguson =

Russian composer

Ludwig-Wilhelm Tepper de Ferguson (a.k.a. Lewis-William Ferguson-Tepper, Ludwig-Wilhelm Tepper von Ferguson, Louis-Guillaume Tepper de Ferguson; 18 December 1768, Warsaw – 12 September 1838, Paris) was a Polish–Russian musician and composer, a music teacher mainly associated with the Imperial Lycée in Tsarskoye Selo (near St Petersburg, Russia).

== Biography ==
=== Origin of the family ===
Ludwig-Wilhelm Tepper de Ferguson was born in Warsaw as the sixth child and third son of the extremely wealthy Polish banker Piotr Fergusson Tepper and his wife Maria-Philippina, née Valentin d'Hauterive. The surname 'Ferguson' indicates the Scottish origin of the family. Indeed, in 1703, his grandfather William Ferguson of Inverurie had emigrated from Scotland to Poland. In 1714, William Ferguson married Katherina-Concordia Tepper, a sister of the wealthy and influential Prussian-Polish merchant and banker, furrier and fur trader Pjotr Tepper of Poznań. Pjotr Tepper managed the large-scale international trade using elite burgher family connections, and imported goods to Poland from many countries, including Britain.

William Ferguson and Katherina-Concordia had three sons. One of them, Peter (1732–1794), who would become Ludwig-Wilhelm's father, entered into partnership with his maternal uncle Pjotr Tepper. In 1767 he was officially adopted by Pjotr Tepper on the condition he would add the name Tepper to his name Ferguson.

In 1779, the Scottish origin of Peter Ferguson Tepper was recognised and confirmed in England, in consequence of which the Scottish and Polish branches of the family re-established relations. According to a column of James Boswell in a later issue of The Scots Magazine (1786): "In June 1779, he [Peter Ferguson-Tepper] had his arms matriculated in the Herald Office, London, and obtained permission to use the surname and arms of Tepper jointly with the surname and arms of Ferguson. The father's writings being destroyed during the civil war in Poland, the son did not know from what part of Scotland his father came; and his Scots relations, not having heard from Poland for near fifty years, believed their friend in that country had died without issue; but the above paragraph in our Magazine caused them to make inquiry, when with equal joy they discovered other; and in a few months thereafter, Mr Ferguson Tepper came to Edinburgh to see them./.../Mr Peter Ferguson Tepper, of Warsaw is supposed to be the second banker in Europe. Mister Walter Ferguson, writer in Edinburgh, and he are brothers' children."

=== Early years ===
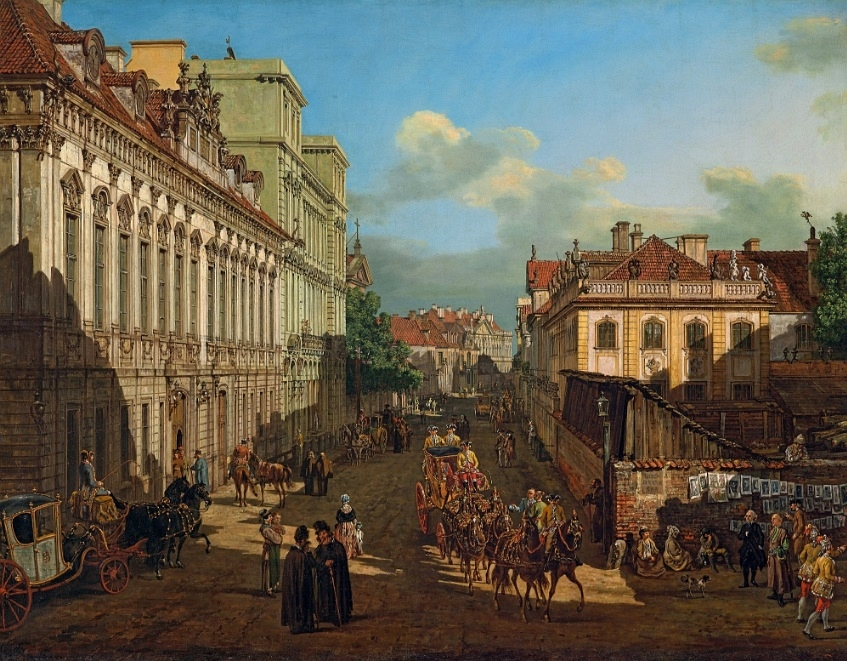
Bernardo Bellotto. The Tepper's Palace, Warsaw

In 1763, Piotr Fergusson Tepper married Maria-Philippina Valentin d'Hauterive (c. 1736–1792), daughter of a French emigrant who left Languedoc, in southern France, after the revocation of the Edict of Nantes in 1685. The 1770s–1780s were the time of their prosperity. The Tepper bank had partners in Holland, Italy, and Russia and undertook large-scale international financial operations. Among their clients were Russian aristocrats and the Polish King Stanisław August Poniatowski, whose army they financed. The splendid Tepper Palace in Warsaw was depicted in 1770 by Bernardo Bellotto.

In 1777, Piotr Fergusson-Tepper became Treasurer and Agent of the Maltese Order. In 1787, the Teppers entertained King Stanislaw-August Poniatowski in their county estate Falenty. Recent research has revealed the participation of the Teppers in Scottish politics of the time: after the death of Princess Charlotte (1753–1789), the illegitimate daughter of Charles Edward Stuart (1720–1788), the last Scottish Pretender for the English throne), the Teppers acted as guardians for her children. In the 1790s, the Teppers were granted the rank of Polish Nobility.

Along with his brothers and sisters, Ludwig-Wilhelm spent his early years in the splendour of his parents' palaces. He was an infant prodigy, and started to play the clavecin at the age of six; at ten he composed music and gave public concerts. His father, however, intended him for law and diplomacy, and in 1781 sent him (together with two of his brothers) to study at the Military Academy of Duke Carl-Eugen in Stuttgart, where he resented the poor quality of music instruction.

From 1783 to 1789, he studied law, history and many other subjects at the University of Strasbourg where in May 1789 he presented his dissertation "Poloniam imperio Romano Germanico nunquam subjectam".

=== Diplomatic career ===
Soon after his return to Warsaw, Tepper was appointed Secretary of Legation to the first Polish diplomatic mission to Spain and was in Madrid between March–July 1791. In 1791–1792, he participated in the Polish diplomatic mission to Dresden in regard to the Constitution of 3 May 1791. During his stay in Dresden (December 1791 – March 1792) his portrait was painted by Anton Graff (present location unknown).

=== In Europe ===
After the beginning of the Russian-Polish war and the crash of his father's bank in 1793, Tepper left Warsaw for Strasbourg. In November 1793 he moved to Vienna, where he spent more than two years. He participated in Viennese musical and cultural life, met Haydn and made the acquaintance of Beethoven. There he started his career as a composer. In 1796 he moved to Hamburg where he set to music Friedrich Schiller's "Ode an die Freude".

=== In Russia ===
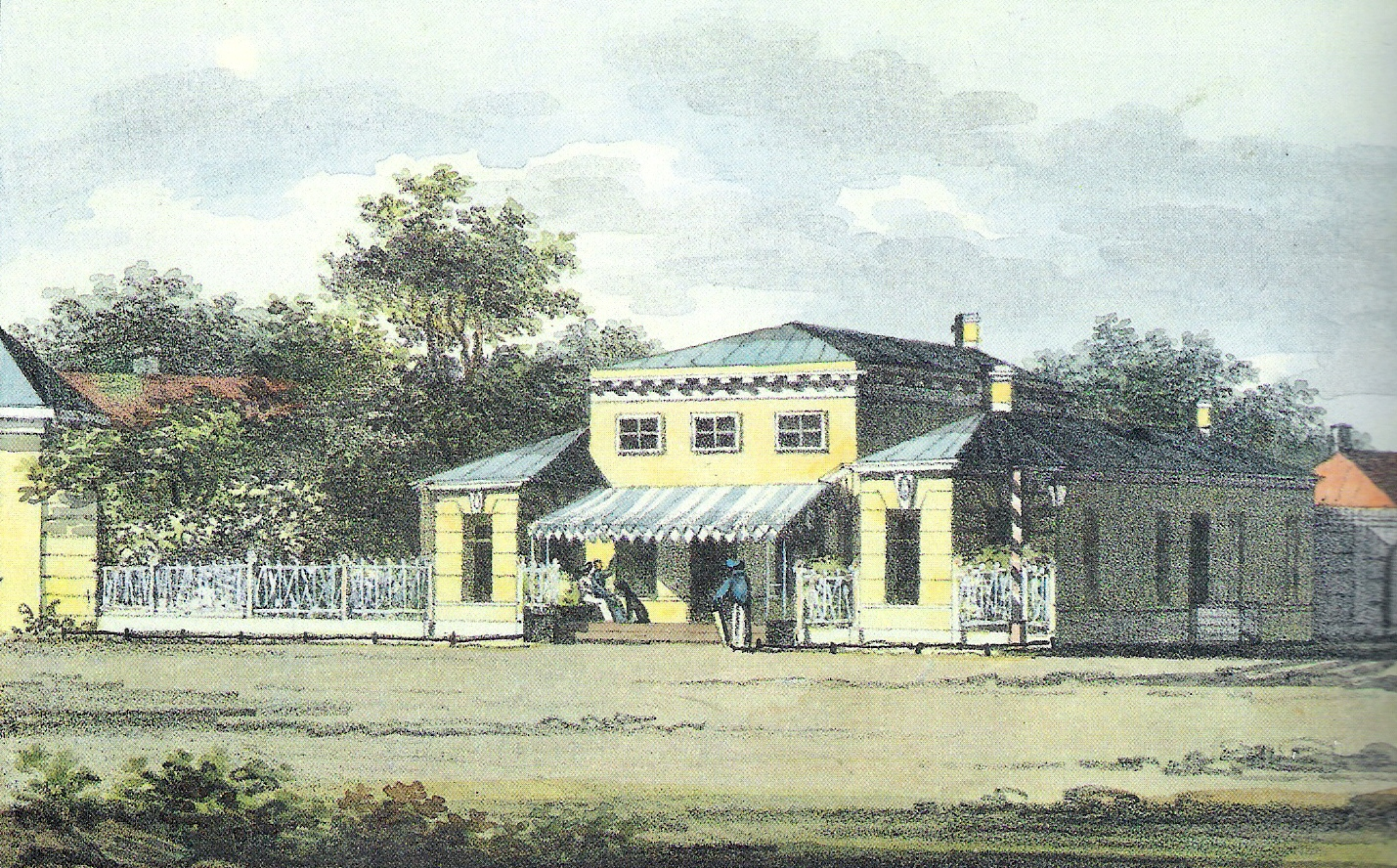
Valerian Langer. Tepper's House in Tsarskoye Selo. 1820

In autumn 1797 he came to St. Petersburg, Russia, where Tepper's bank used to have business partners and was well known to the Russian aristocracy. There he started his career as a music teacher and composer. Many of his musical compositions which have been preserved in the libraries of St. Petersburg, Vienna, Hamburg, and Weimar, bear dedications to famous members of the St. Petersburg society, such as Princess Golitsyna, Princess Kourakine, and Countess Mniszek.

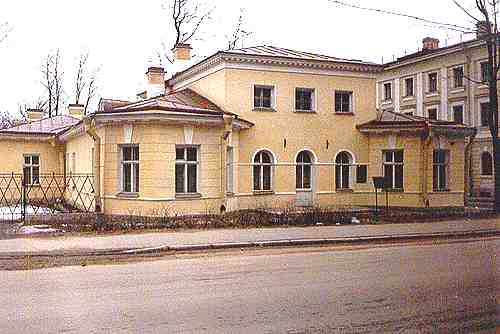
Tepper's House in Tsarskoe Selo. Modern View

From 1800, Tepper held the post of the court Kapellmeister, after Giuseppe Sarti. He taught music to Grand Duchesses Helena, Maria, Ekaterina, and Anna, the younger sisters of the Emperor Alexander I. In 1811–1812, Tepper de Ferguson gave music lessons to Elizabeth Alexeievna, the consort of Alexander I.

He participated in earlier St. Petersburg performances of Haydn's oratorio The Creation (1801 and later). From 1802, he was a member of the newly founded St. Petersburg Philharmonic Society and regularly took part in its concerts. In 1812, his own oratorio Te Deum was performed in St. Petersburg.

In 1802 he married Jeanne-Henriette Severin (1780–1823), a daughter of a wealthy St. Petersburg banker. Her sister was the wife of the Portuguese diplomat and merchant José Pedro Celestino Velho (1755–1802). Tepper and Jeanne-Henriette brought up Jeanne-Henriette's niece, Josephine Velho (1802–1820) who was born just after her father's death. From the 1810s, the Teppers lived in Tsarskoe Selo. Their house has survived and is still known as "Tepper's House".

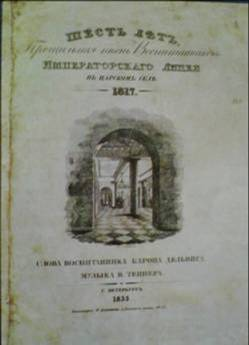
L-W Tepper de Ferguson.'Six Years.' The Farewell Song of the first students of the Imperial Lycee in Tsarskoe Selo

From 1816, Tepper taught choir singing and music at the Imperial Lycée, where his pupils included Alexander Pushkin. Tepper composed music for the amateur theatrical performances which took place in the Lycée, and organised a choir of the Lycée students which gave informal performances in Tsarskoe Selo. In 1817, he composed music to the "Six Years, the Farewell Song of the First Students of the Imperial Lycée in Tsarskoe Selo", the words of which were written by Anton Delvig. The Farewell Song is one of the best-known Tepper compositions. In 1818, he composed choral music for the consecration of the new Evangelical church in Tsarskoe Selo. In the words of Wilhelm Küchelbecker, "Music, full of feeling and expression, is worth our honourable friend, good Tepper."

=== Last years ===
In 1819, Tepper de Ferguson, his wife and step-daughter undertook a long European travel. However, when in Paris, Josephine Velho died in a tragic accident (July 1820), and in 1823 his wife died in Dresden. Tepper de Ferguson returned to Russia for a short time, but left in May 1824 for Paris, where in July 1824 he married Marie Catherine Adelaide Canel (1790–1834). His last years were spent in Paris where he was known as Louis-Guillaume, baron Tepper de Ferguson. He died in Paris in 1838.

A nephew of Ludwig-Wilhelm, Pierre Charles Guillaume Fergusson-Tepper (the son of Peter Charles and Marie-Henriette Boué) established a successful and profitable business producing printed fabric in Bavilliers (Franche-Comté, France). Among his children were Marie Philippine, Tepper's god-daughter, and Louis Guillaume Edouard Fergusson-Tepper (1837–1890) who might have been named after Tepper. Louis Guillaume Edouard became a sculptor and exhibited his works in the Salons of Paris in the 1870s.

== Siblings and relatives ==
Ludwig-Wilhelm had nine brothers and sisters:

- Henrika-Katarina (born 24 May 1763) married in 1780 August-Wilhelm Arndt, an employee at the Tepper bank.
- Charlotte Rosa (born 4 July 1764) was in her first marriage the wife of Baron d'Axt, Minister of Prussia in Warsaw. Her second husband was Colonel Milashevich of the Russian military service. She died in 1784 in Kiev.
- Elżbieta Dorota (born 8 August 1765) married in 1783 Karol Szulc (Schulz, Schultz), a young banker in Warsaw.
- Peter-Charles (Peter-Karol) (1766–1817) married Marie Henriette Boué (born 1769), daughter of Pierre Boué (1738–1802), an influential banker in Hamburg.
- Philipp-Bernard (1 August 1767 – 1829). In 1786 he was sent by his father to Edinburgh where on 5 July 1786 he was granted the citizenship of the city of Edinburgh. In the 1820s, he held a post at the Grand Duke Constantin's administration in Warsaw and died with the title Collegiate councillor (a rank in the Russian administration. He was buried in the Warsaw Evangelical-Reformed (Calvinist) Cemetery in the Powązki district, which had been established in 1792 on the property of his brother-in-law Karol Szulc.
- Daniel-Frederick (born in 1772).
- Ann-Margaret (born 11 August 1775)
- Anna-Isabel (born 12 August 1778) married in 1792 Count Jan Henryk Wołodkowicz (1765–1825) and divorced him in 1804. She remarried and became Anna Worcell.
- Otto-Walter (1779–1797). There is a portrait of him dated 1785 at the National Museum, Warsaw.

== Legacy and selected compositions ==
In Russia, Tepper is immediately recognised as Alexander Pushkin's music teacher. But in the wider context of Russian and European cultural life of that time, his participation in the introduction of Haydn's Creation to Russian audiences seems even more important. Tepper's chamber music is well known in Russia and Europe and it is constantly performed. His "Farewell Song" is traditionally performed annually at the Museum of the Pushkin Lycée in Tsarskoe Selo on 19 October (the anniversary of the inauguration of the Lycée in 1811). Music scores of Tepper's compositions have been preserved in the music libraries of St. Petersburg, Hamburg, Vienna, Weimar, etc.

- An die Freude. Hamburg. 1796.
- Zwölf deutsche Lieder von den besten Dichtern. Hamburg. 1798.
- Neuf variations sur l'air de la Pastorale de Nina pour le Clavecin ou Forte Piano. 1798.
- Opera 'Eulenspiegel', 1800. Libretto by August von Kotzebue (1761–1819).
- Opera 'Herminie', 1798–1800. Libretto by Marie Joseph Hyacinthe de Gaston (1767—1808).
- Variations sur l'air "Loin de toi ma Felicie" / composées et dediées à Madame la Princesse Galizin née Princesse Wiazemski. c. 1800.
- Variations sur une romance de la composition de Madame la Princesse Kourakin née Comtesse Golowin. c. 1800.
- Variations sur un air de danse de Monsieur l'abbé Vogler / composées et dediées à Madame A. E. De Pestel, née de Kroock. c. 1800.
- Variations sur une romance de la composition de Mademoiselle S. de K. (cinq ans y a que connais ma Delphine). c. 1800.
- Romance de l'opera 'Une folie' de Mehul, variée très humblement.
- Danse cosaque mise en variations.
- Oratorio "Te Deum". 1812.
- Oratorio on the Deliverance of Moscow. 1812.
- Six Years. The Farewell Song of the First Students of the Imperial Lycée in Tsarskoe Selo. 1817.
- Sonata in D. Piano 4 hands.1818.
- La Pauvre Laure. Romance. Paroles de M*** Paris. c. 1825.

== Literature ==
- Грот, Я. Пушкин, его лицейские товарищи и наставники. СПб.1887. (Yakov Grot. Pushkin, ego litseyskie tovarishchi i nastavniki—Pushkin, his Lycée friends and Tutors. SPb, 1887).
- Ступель, А. Лицейский учитель пения. In: Пушкин: Исследования и материалы. М-Л.1960. Т.3. (Stupel', A. Litseyskii uchitel' peniya—A Lycée music teacher. In: Pushkin. Researches and Materials. Moscow-Leningrad, 1960. Vol.3).
- Руденские М.П. и С.Д. Наставникам ... за благо воздадим. Л.1986. (Rudensky, M.P. and S.D. Nastavnikam ... za blago vozdadim. – Let us thank our tutors ... Leningrad, 1986).
- Яценко О.А. Учитель пения: Штрихи к биографии Л-В Теппера де Фергюсона. Дома у Пушкина. СПб, 1994. (Yatsenko, O.A. Uchitel' peniya: shtrikhi k biografii L-W Teppera de Fergusona. – The music teacher: some additions to the biography of L-W Tepper de Ferguson. In: At Pushkin's home. SPb, 1994).
- Людвиг Вильгельм Теппер де Фергюсон. Моя история./Пер. и сост. О.А.Байрд (Яценко)/. СПб., "Дмитрий Буланин", 2013. (Ludwig Wilhelm Tepper de Ferguson. My Story. /Translated and edited by Olga Baird (Yatsenko)/. SPb., "Dmitry Bulanin", 2013.

== Records ==
- Oleg Timofeyev. Talisman, Music of Russian Princesses: From the Court of Catherine the Great (Dorian Records, 2001)
- Music-Pushkin-Epoch, ,
