= Świnka =

Świnka may refer to:

- Świnka coat of arms
- Jakub Świnka
