= Theodosius Rostocki =

Metropolitan of Kiev, Galicia and all Ruthenia (1788–1805)

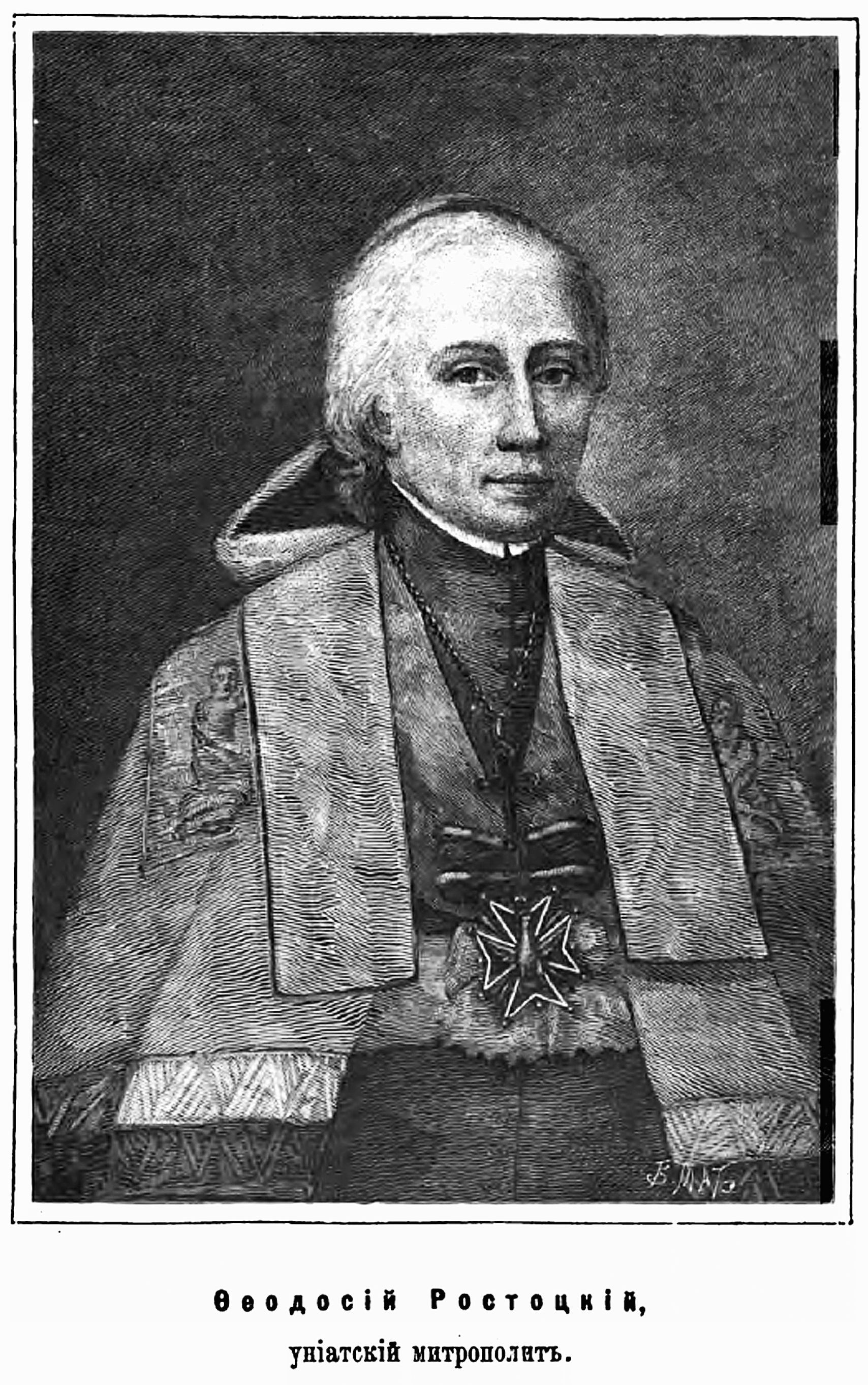

Theodosius Rostocki (born as Tadeusz Teodozy Bołbas-Rostocki h. Juńczyk; Polish: Teodozy Rostocki; 1725 – 25 January 1805) was the "Metropolitan of Kiev, Galicia and all Ruthenia". (Note: The title is also known as the Metropolis of Kiev, Halych and all Rus' or Metropolis of Kyiv, Halychyna, and All-Rus'. The name "Galicia" is a Latinized form of Halych, one of several regional principalities of the medieval state of Kievan Rus'.) He became the first Uniate bishop who was a member of the Polish Senate.

On 19 June 1785 Rostocki was ordained by Primate of the Uniate Church Jason Smogorzewski along with bishops Cyprian Stecki and John Kaczkowski as a bishop of Chelm. Earlier that year he also was confirmed as a coadjutor Metropolitan bishop of Kiev, Galicia and all Ruthenia.

Following the death of Jason Smogorzewski, on 1 November 1788 he succeeded as the Metropolitan bishop of Kiev, Galicia, and all Ruthenia. In 1790 he resigned as bishop of Chelm. In 1796 Rostocki created Eparchy of Suprasl on territory of the New East Prussia creation of which was approved by the Pope in couple of years.

He consecrated following bishops Josaphat Bulhak, Porfiriusz Skarbek-Ważyński and Adrian Butrymowicz.

After the third partition of Poland, Rostocki was detained by the Russian authorities and was forced to move to Saint Petersburg where he died in 1805.

== Notes ==
Ruthenian Uniate Church titles
Preceded by Maksymilian Rylo	Bishop of Chelm; 1785 – 1790	Succeeded by Porphyrius Skarbek Wazynski
Preceded by Jason Smogorzewski	Metropolitan of Kiev, Galicia and all Ruthenia; 1788 – 1805	Succeeded by Heraclius Lisowski as "Metropolitan of all Uniates"; Not recognised by the Holy See
Preceded by Jason Smogorzewski	Metropolitan of Kiev, Galicia and all Ruthenia; 1788 – 1805	Succeeded by Antonius Angelowicz as Metropolitan of Galicia, and Archbishop of Lemberg
Preceded by Jason Smogorzewski	Metropolitan of Kiev, Galicia and all Ruthenia; 1788 – 1805	Succeeded by Theodosius Wislocki as Bishop of Suprasl
