= Jason Smogorzewski =

Metropolitan of Kiev, Galicia and all Ruthenia (1781–1788)

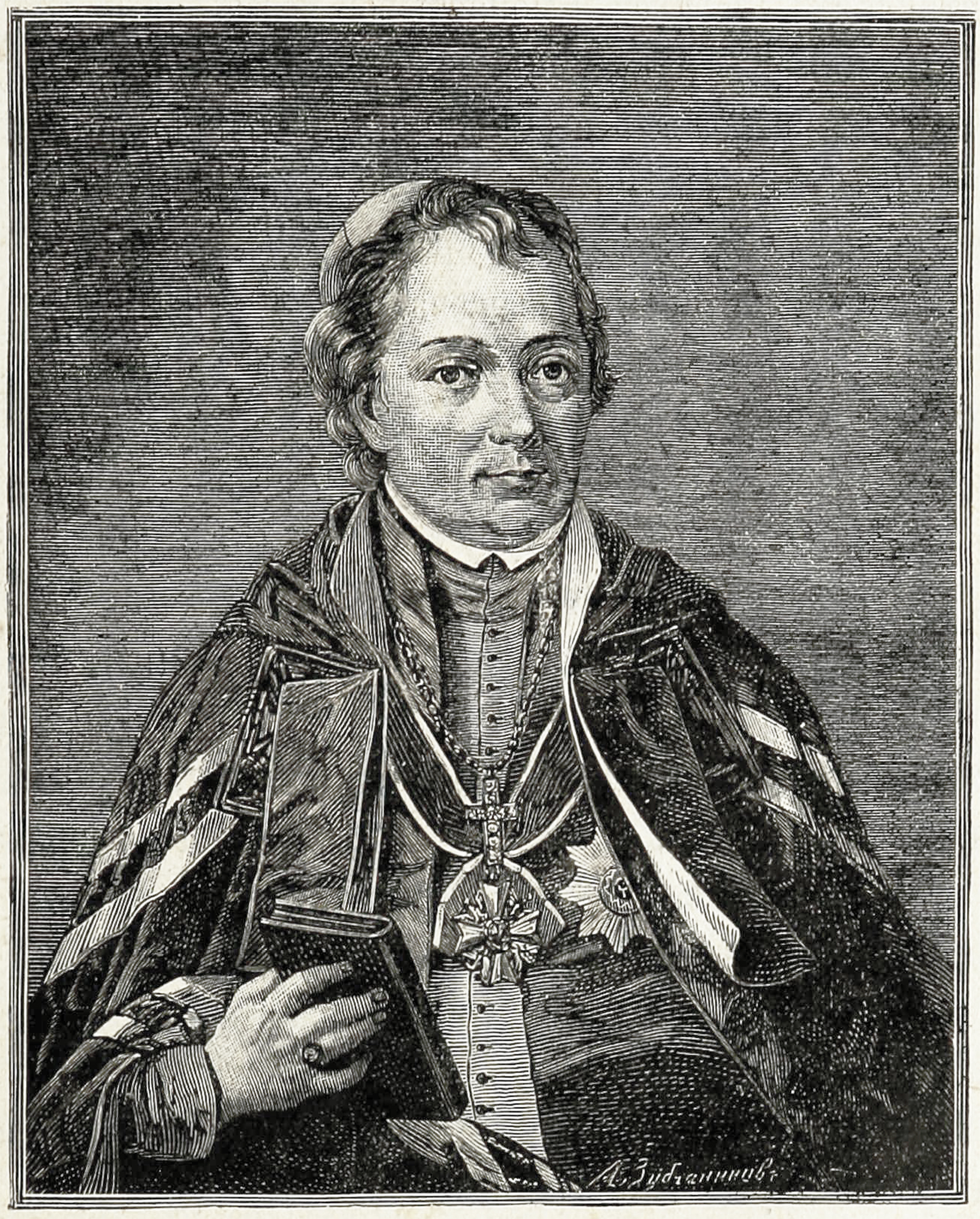

Jason Smogorzewski (born as Jan Smogorzewski; Polish: Jason Junosza Smogorzewski; 3 May 1715 – 27 September 1788) was the "Metropolitan of Kiev, Galicia and all Ruthenia". (Note: The title is also known as the Metropolis of Kiev, Halych and all Rus' or Metropolis of Kyiv, Halychyna, and All-Rus'. The name "Galicia" is a Latinized form of Halych, one of several regional principalities of the medieval state of Kievan Rus'.) He became the first ethnic Pole who headed the Ruthenian Uniate Church. Smogorzewski became the first metropolitan to be elected and confirmed following the Russian annexation of Polotsk where he was archbishop.

In 1731 he joined the Order of Basilians and changed from Latin-rite to Byzantine-rite.

On 31 December 1758 Smogorzewski was ordained by archbishop of Durrës Joseph Schiro (Albanian Greek Catholic Church) as a coadjutor archbishop of Polock becoming a vicar bishop of Vitebsk. On 18 July 1762 he succeeded archbishop Florian Hrebnicki.

Following the death of Leo Szeptycki on 24 May 1779, Smogorzewski served as the administrator of the metropolis. On 30 Oct 1780 he was selected as Metropolitan bishop of Kiev, Galicia, and all Ruthenia and was confirmed on 25 June 1781.

He consecrated the following bishops: Peter Bielański, Michael Stadnicki and Theodosius Rostocki.

Smogorzewski died in 1788 in Radomyshl where he started to build new metropolitan complex for the Ruthenian Church.

== Notes ==
Ruthenian Uniate Church titles
Preceded by Florian Hrebnicki	Archbishop of Polock; 1758 – 1780; Served alongside: Florian Hrebnicki as coadjutor bishop until 1762	Succeeded by Heraclius Lisowski
Preceded by Leo Szeptycki	Metropolitan of Kiev, Galicia and all Ruthenia; 1781 – 1788	Succeeded by Theodosius Rostocki
