= Peter Bielański =

Ukrainian Greek Catholic hierarch

Petro Bilyanskyi
- Ruthenian Catholic Eparchy of Lviv, Halych and Kamianets-Podilskyi
- Church: Ukrainian Greek Catholic Church
- In office: 30 October 1779 – 29 May 1798
- Predecessor: Lev Sheptytskyi
- Successor: Mykola Skorodynskyi
- Other post: Administrator of Ruthenian Catholic Eparchy of Przemyśl, Sambir and Sanok (1793–1796)

Orders
- Ordination: c. 1760 (Priest)
- Consecration: 23 September 1781 (Bishop) by Jason Smogorzewski

Personal details
- Born: Petro Bilyanskyi; 1736 Zhovkva, Polish–Lithuanian Commonwealth (present day Lviv Oblast, Ukraine)
- Died: 29 May 1798 (aged 61–62) Lviv, Habsburg monarchy (present day Ukraine)
- Coat of arms

Peter Bielański (Ukrainian: Петро Білянський, Polish: Piotr Bielański; 1736 – 29 May 1798) was a Ukrainian Greek Catholic hierarch. He was the Eparchial Bishop of the Ruthenian Catholic Eparchy of Lviv, Halych and Kamianets-Podilskyi from 1798 to 1805.

== Life ==
Born in Zhovkva, Polish–Lithuanian Commonwealth (present day Lviv Oblast, Ukraine) in a bourgeois family in 1736. He was ordained a priest and become a Canon of the St. George's Cathedral, Lviv until his election as bishop.

He was confirmed by the Holy See as an Eparchial Bishop of the Ruthenian Catholic Eparchy of Lviv, Halych and Kamianets-Podilskyi on 30 October 1779. He was consecrated to the Episcopate on 23 September 1781. The principal consecrator was Metropolitan Yason Smohozhevskyi.

With his assistance, a seminary for the Greek Catholics was opened in Lviv on 30 August 1783. A clarification of the limits of the eparchy was made, its division into the decanats.

He died in Lviv on 29 May 1798.

Catholic Church titles
Preceded by Lev Septytskyi	Ruthenian Catholic Eparchy of Lviv, Halych and Kamianets-Podilskyi; 1779–1798	Succeeded by Mykola Skorodynskyi
Preceded by Maksymilian Rylo	Administrator of Ruthenian Catholic Eparchy of Przemyśl, Sambir and Sanok; 1793–1796	Succeeded by Antin Anhelovych
