= Leo Szeptycki =

Metropolitan of Kiev, Galicia and all Ruthenia (1778–1779)

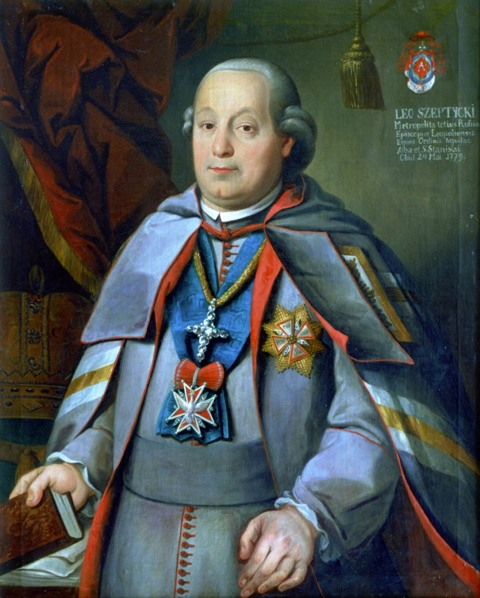

Leo Sheptycki (born as Leon Ludwik Szeptycki; Polish: Leon Ludwik Szeptycki; 23 August 1717 – 13 May 1779) was the "Metropolitan of Kiev, Galicia and all Ruthenia" (Note: The title is also known as the Metropolis of Kiev, Halych and all Rus' or Metropolis of Kyiv, Halychyna, and All-Rus'. The name "Galicia" is a Latinized form of Halych, one of several regional principalities of the medieval state of Kievan Rus'.)

On 14 May 1749 Sheptycki was ordained by bishop of Luck Theodosius Rudnicki-Lubieniecki with help of Theodosius Godebski and Adam Oranski as a bishop of Lwow.

On 20 December 1762 he was confirmed as the Coadjutor Metropolitan bishop of Kiev, Galicia, and all Ruthenia. On 1 February 1778 he succeeded Metropolitan Philip.

He consecrated following bishops Gedeon Horbacki, and Athanasius Szeptycki. He died on 24 May 1779

== Notes ==
Ruthenian Uniate Church titles
Preceded by Onuphrius Szumlanski	Ruthenian Catholic Eparchy of Lviv, Halych and Kamianets-Podilskyi; 1749 – 1778	Succeeded by Peter Bielanski
Preceded by Philip Wolodkowicz	Metropolitan of Kiev, Galicia and all Ruthenia; 1778 – 1779	Succeeded by Jason Smogorzewski
