= Florian Hrebnicki =

Metropolitan of Kiev, Galicia and all Ruthenia (1748–1762)

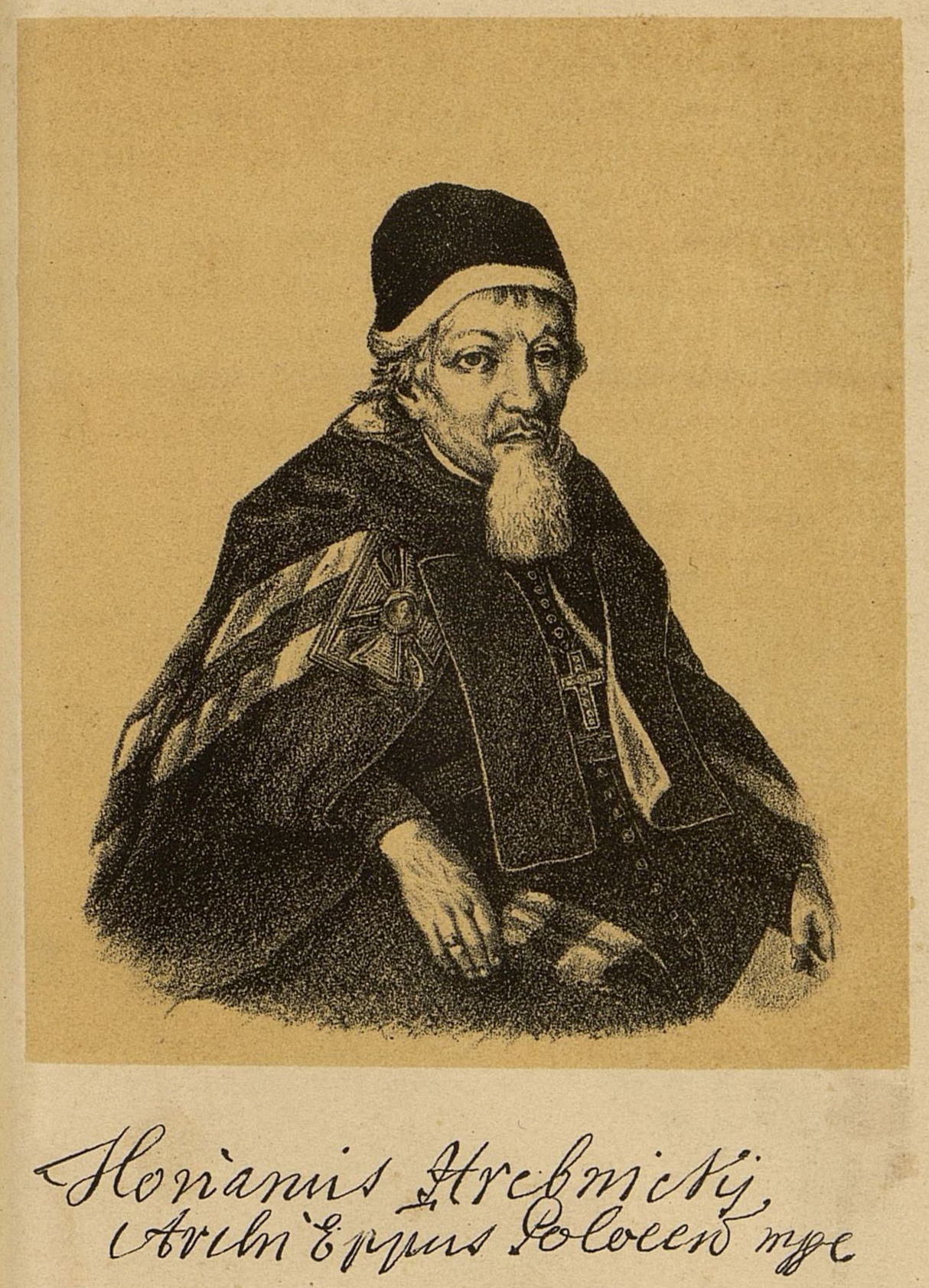

Florian Hrebnicki (born as Franciszek Hrebnicki; Polish: Florian Hrebnicki; 1683 – 18 July 1762) was the "Metropolitan of Kiev, Galicia and all Ruthenia" (Note: The title is also known as the Metropolis of Kiev, Halych and all Rus' or Metropolis of Kyiv, Halychyna, and All-Rus'. The name "Galicia" is a Latinized form of Halych, one of several regional principalities of the medieval state of Kievan Rus'.)

On 14 March 1716 Hrebnicki was ordained by Primate of the Uniate church Leo Kiszka as a archbishop of Polock.

On 16 December 1748 he was confirmed as the Metropolitan bishop of Kiev, Galicia, and all Ruthenia.

He consecrated following bishops Maksymilian Rylo and Theodosius Godebski.

Hrebnicki died in 1762 at a residence of the Polotsk Archbishops that he built in village of Strunie (today in Polotsk District).

== Notes ==
Ruthenian Uniate Church titles
Preceded by Sylwester Peszkiewicz	Archbishop of Polock; 1715 – 1762	Succeeded by Jason Smogorzewski
Preceded by Athanasius Szeptycki	Metropolitan of Kiev, Galicia and all Ruthenia; 1748 – 1762	Succeeded by Philip Wolodkowicz
