= Maksymilian Rylo =

Greek-Catholic Bishop

Maksymilian Rylo, O.S.B.M.
- Ruthenian Catholic Eparchy of Przemyśl, Sambir and Sanok
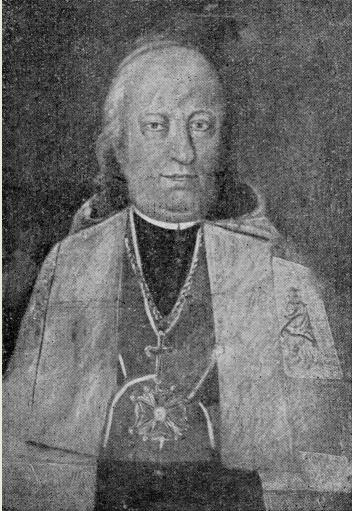
- Church: Ukrainian Greek Catholic Church
- In office: 2 September 1785 – 22 November 1793
- Predecessor: himself as Administrator
- Successor: Petro Bilyanskyi (Administrator)
- Other posts: Bishop of Ruthenian Catholic Eparchy of Chełm–Belz (1756–1785), Administrator of Ruthenian Catholic Eparchy of Przemyśl, Sambir and Sanok (1780–1785)

Orders
- Ordination: 22 September 1742 (Priest) by Basilio Matranga
- Consecration: 24 February 1759 (Bishop) by Florian Hrebnytskyi

Personal details
- Born: Maksymilian baron Rylo; 21 September 1719 near Barysaw, Polish–Lithuanian Commonwealth (present day Barysaw Raion, Belarus)
- Died: 22 November 1793 (aged 74) Przemyśl, Habsburg monarchy (present day Poland)

Maksymilian Rylo, O.S.B.M. (Polish: Maksymilian Ryłło, Ukrainian: Максиміліян Рило; 21 September 1719 – 22 November 1793) was the Eparch of Chełm–Belz in the Ruthenian Uniate Church from 1756 to 1785. He was the Administrator of the Eparchy of Przemyśl, Sambir and Sanok from 1780 to 1785 and an Eparchial Bishop of the same Ruthenian Catholic Eparchy of Przemyśl, Sambir and Sanok from 1785 until his death in 1793.

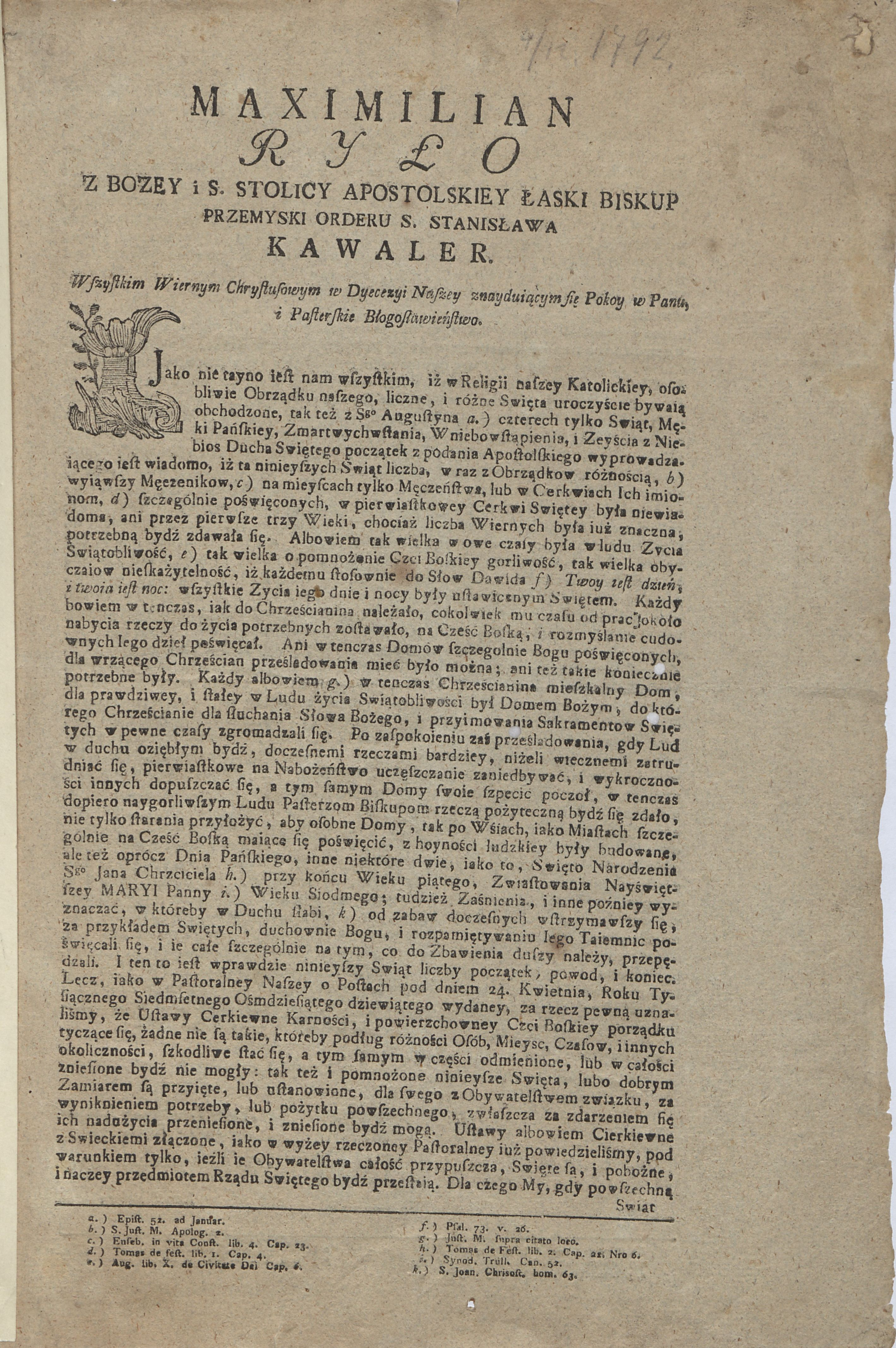
Pastoral letter of Bishop Maksymilian Rylo from 1792

== Life ==
Born in the family estate near Barysaw, Polish–Lithuanian Commonwealth (present day Minsk Region, Belarus) or, according another dates, in Rylivka, near Vilnius (present day Lithuania) in a noble Catholic family of Hieronim and Anna (née Miecznikowski) Rylo in 1719 or 1715.

Rylo joined the Monastery of the Holy Trinity in Vilnius of the Order of Saint Basil the Great in a young age, where he made a profession and was sent to complete a philosophical and theological studies in Rome in the Pontifical Urban University, where he ultimately earned a doctorate in sacred theology. He was ordained as a priest on 22 September 1742, in Rome.

After returning from Italy, he had a various pastoral assignments and served as superior and hegumen at the Basilian Institutes in the Polish–Lithuanian Commonwealth.

He was confirmed by the Holy See as an Eparchial Bishop of the Eparchy of Chełm–Belz on 15 November 1756. He was consecrated to the Episcopate on 24 February 1759. The principal consecrator was Metropolitan Florian Hrebnytskyi.

With his initiative, a seminary for the Greek Catholics was opened in Chełm in 1759. Also during the First Partition of Poland Bishop Rylo was imprisoned by Russian Government for some months in 1774.

He died in Przemyśl on 22 November 1793.

Catholic Church titles
Preceded by Fylyp Volodkovych	Ruthenian Catholic Bishop of Chełm–Belz; 1756–1785	Succeeded by Teodosiy Rostotskyi
Preceded by Atanasiy Sheptytskyi	Administrator of Ruthenian Catholic Eparchy of Przemyśl, Sambir and Sanok; 1780–1785	Succeeded by himself as Eparchial Bishop
Preceded by himself as Administrator	Ruthenian Catholic Bishop of Przemyśl, Sambir and Sanok; 1785–1793	Succeeded by Petro Bilyanskyi (as Administrator)
