= Aleksandra Zajączkowa =

Polish noblewoman (1754 - 1845)

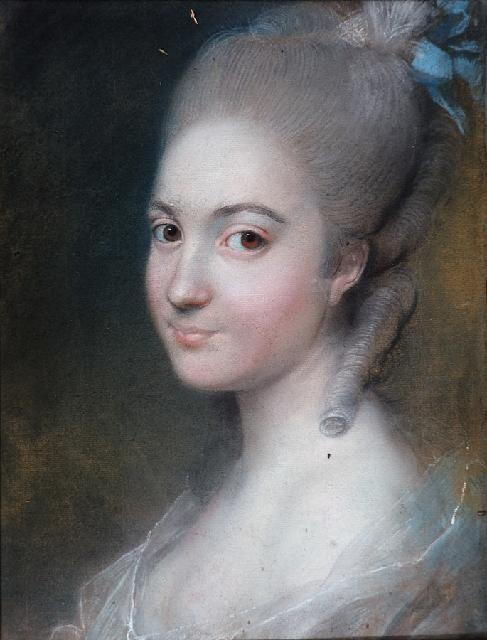
Aleksandra Zajączek (1754 - 1845)

Aleksandra Zajączek (1754 - 1845), (also called Alexandrine Pernet, Aleksandra Pernet) was a Polish noblewoman. Originally a dancer, she first married a medical doctor named Isaure, and later married Józef Zajączek, who became Viceroy of Poland in 1815-26. She was known for her beauty, and for the treatments she recommended in order to keep it.
