= Świnka coat of arms =

Polish coat of arms

Świnka
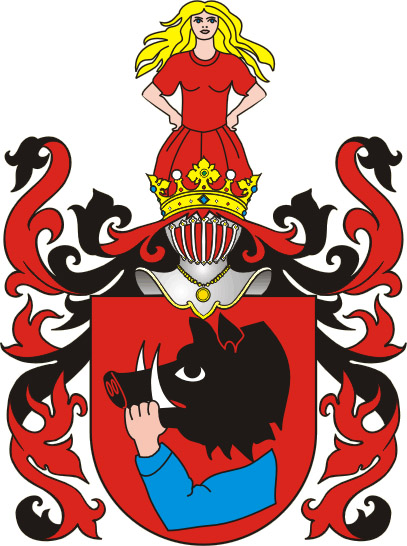
- Battle cry: Świnka
- Alternative names: Parcaria, Parvus Sus, Porcaria Sus, Świnia głowa
- Earliest mention: 1108
- Towns: castle Świny
- Families: Błeszyński, Bogusławski, Bratkowski, Cholawski, Czacki, Czaczkowski, Czajewski, Danewicz, Dewknetowicz, Dewknotowicz, Dowknotowicz, Dziwosz, Gawroński, Grabianowski, Grzebski, Grzębski, Grzybieński, Grzymaczewski, Ikierat, Jentkiewicz, Jeżewicz, Jutrkowski, Kaczkowski, Kakanowski, Kakawski, Kakowski, Kamieński, Kamiński, Kania, Krzczonanowski, Krzczonowski, Krzyżanowski, Malborski, Mączeński, Mączyński, Michelsdorf, Mikuszewski, Pęciłło, Piotrowski, Podbrzeski, Pomorzański, Porkus, Robaczynski, Rucki, Semisłowski, Stroliński, Stwoliński, Strzycki, Strzyski, Świnka, Tomisławski, Weperm, Wierzycki, Zajączek, Zieliński, Zmysłowski

Świnka (Polish for "Boar") is a Polish coat of arms. It was used by several szlachta (noble) families.

== History ==
The Świnka dynasty possesses one of the oldest recorded coats of arms in Poland. According to legend, the history of the Świńka family began in 712, when a certain Biwoj, squire to Queen Libusza, heroically gifted her a giant boar that he had hunted down in the forest. The queen rewarded him with the coat of arms (though this was long before Western heraldry as we know it developed), the village of Świny (German: Swinehausen, both referring to pigs) in Silesia, and her daughter. The boar's head in the field and blonde maiden on the crest allude to this tale.

== Notable bearers ==
Notable bearers of this coat of arms have included:

- Józef Zajączek, Prince, General
- Andrzej Czacki, Catholic bishop
- Jakub Świnka (1283–1314), Archbishop of Gniezno
- Włodzimierz Krzyżanowski, General in US Civil War

== Gallery ==
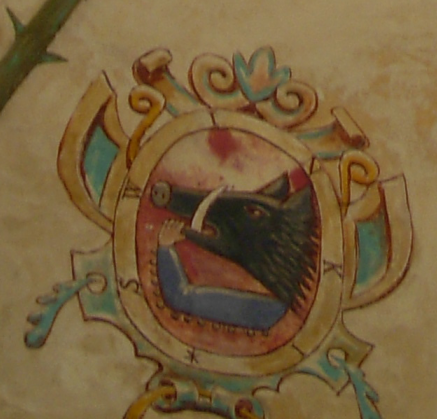
Swinka coat of arms in Baranow-Sandomierski castle.

Coat of Arms of Counts Czacki

== See also ==
- Polish heraldry
- Heraldic family
- List of Polish nobility coats of arms

== Bibliography ==
- Nieznana szlachta polska i jej herby - Wiktor Wittyg
- Herby Rodów Polskich (Polish Coats of Arms) - Mieczysław Paszkiewicz ISBN 0-901149-34-9, reprint of "Herby Szlachty Polskiej" - Zbigniew Leszczyc, 1908
