= Filip Felicjan Wołodkowicz =

Metropolitan of Kiev, Galicia and all Ruthenia (1762–1778)

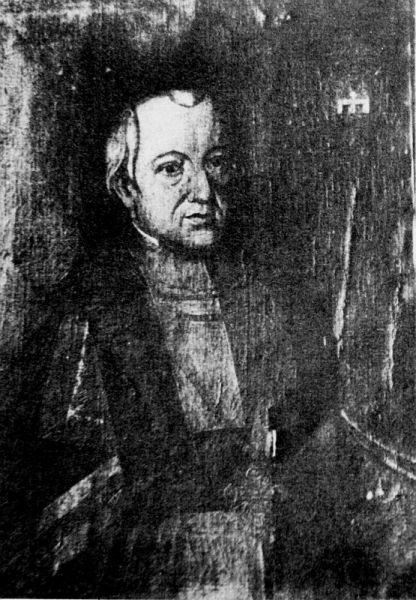

Filip Felicjan Wołodkowicz (6 June 1698 – 12 February 1778) was the "Metropolitan of Kiev, Galicia and all Ruthenia" (Note: The title is also known as the Metropolis of Kiev, Halych and all Rus' or Metropolis of Kyiv, Halychyna, and All-Rus'. The name "Galicia" is a Latinized form of Halych, one of several regional principalities of the medieval state of Kievan Rus'.)

On 1731 Wołodkowicz was ordained by Primate of the Uniate church Athanasius Szeptycki as a bishop of Chełm.

On 22 November 1758 Wolodkowicz was appointed a bishop of Volodymyr and Brest.

On 18 July 1762 he was confirmed as the Metropolitan bishop of Kyiv, Galicia, and all Ruthenia.

He consecrated following bishops Athanasius Szeptycki, Heraclius Lisanski, Cyprian Stecki, and Patriarch Giorgio Maria Lascaris.

== Notes ==
Ruthenian Uniate Church titles
Preceded by Joseph Lewicki	Bishop of Chelm; 1731 – 1758	Succeeded by Maksymilian Rylo
Preceded by Theodosius Godebski	Bishop of Wlodzimierz and Bresc; 1756 – 1778	Succeeded by Antonius Mlodowski
Preceded by Florian Hrebnicki	Metropolitan of Kiev, Galicia and all Ruthenia; 1762 – 1778	Succeeded by Leo Sheptycki
