= Wołodkowicz family =

Noble family in Grand Duchy of Lithuania

Wołodkowicz Wołodkowiczowie
- Noble family
- The Radwan coat of arms; the family bore a variant, Radwan odmienny
- Country: Polish–Lithuanian Commonwealth
- Origin: Grand Duchy of Lithuania
- Founded: First documented 1435
- Members: Felicjan Filip Wołodkowicz; Jan Henryk Wołodkowicz; Krzysztof Wołodkowicz; Alexander Wołodkowicz
- Motto: Gloria tibi Domine (Glory to You, Lord)
- Estates: Radoszkowicze; Iwansk; Sienna; Nowy Dwór
- Cadet branches: Nowy Dwór; Iwansk; French; Ukrainian; Galician

The House of Wołodkowicz (Polish: Wołodkowiczowie; Lithuanian: Valatkevičiai, Valadkevičiai, Valadkovičiai, Volodkevičiai) is a landowning Polish–Lithuanian noble family originating from the Grand Duchy of Lithuania, documented as early as 1435 and noted for its extensive estates and its members' political, military and ecclesiastical roles in the Commonwealth.

== Origin ==
The surname is a Slavic patronymic derived from the given name Wołodko, a diminutive of Wołodymyr. The family's early ancestry has traditionally been associated with Ruthenian and Lithuanian princely lineages, including the Drucki family, a branch of the Rurik dynasty. Another genealogical tradition connected the family to the ruling Lithuanian dynasty through Racza, described in older accounts as a sister of Vytautas the Great.

This connection was subsequently disputed, and an alternative line of descent was proposed through Prince Wołodko Iwanowicz Horski, recorded as starosta of Oszmiana in 1515.

Wołodkowicz Palace in Kraków, 2022

The family's formal proof of nobility (wywód szlachecki), examined by the Imperial Heraldry Department in Saint Petersburg, described it as od kniaziów pochodzący ("descended from Ruthenian or Lithuanian princes"), consistent with its tradition of princely ancestry, despite remaining untitled, as was standard among the Polish–Lithuanian szlachta.

From the 16th century onwards, members of the family held administrative, military and ecclesiastical offices in the Polish–Lithuanian Commonwealth, including the voivodeship of Nowogródek and the Greek Catholic Metropolitanate of Kyiv. The family also established marriage alliances with prominent noble and princely houses.

== History ==
=== 15th century ===
The Wołodkowicz family is documented in the Grand Duchy of Lithuania from at least 1435, when Stanisław Wołodkowicz was recorded as a landowner near Minsk.

Seńko Wołodkowicz of Mścisław is documented in 1496 in a dispute over the estate of Hostoml, and in 1499, as a courtier (dworzanin) of Alexander Jagiellon, in connection with estates in the Mścisław region. Niekras Wołodkowicz served as namiestnik of Bełżyce in 1499.

=== 16th century ===
In 1551, Marcin Wołodkowicz, a royal boyar, received three villages in the Trakai district from King Sigismund II Augustus. In 1559, a Marcin Wołodkowicz served as royal messenger to Moscow during the Livonian War.

Marcin Wołodkowicz (c.1510–1595), possibly the same individual mentioned above, is regarded as the common ancestor of the principal branches of the Wołodkowicz family. He was the ambassador of the Grand Duchy of Lithuania in Moscow from 1573 and the Governor of Minsk from 1588. He was married to Rajna princess Drucka-Horska. Marcin Wołodkowicz had several children, most of whom had high positions in the Grand Duchy of Lithuania.

=== 17th century ===
By the 17th century the family had divided into several lines, settled mainly in the Nowogródek and Minsk voivodeships, where its members held local judicial and administrative offices. Janusz Wołodkowicz became judge of Minsk in 1653, and Krzysztof Wołodkowicz was appointed voivode of Nowogródek in 1658.

During the war with Muscovy of 1654–1667, Stanisław Wołodkowicz, a captain (rotmistrz) of the Vitebsk Voivodeship, took part in the defence of Vitebsk. He was taken prisoner in 1655 and held for eight years in Kazan. There he was one of 59 captive nobles who met as a sejmik in exile and condemned those of their countrymen who had gone over to the tsar and converted to Orthodoxy, declaring them barred from public office.

In 1668, Marcin Wołodkowicz, deputy starosta of Minsk, and his wife Helena née Kostrowiecka acquired an estate near Radoszkowicze, previously held by the Dorohostajski and Górski families. The property, comprising approximately 2,500 desyatinas (2,730 hectares) across three folwarks, remained in the possession of the Wołodkowicz family into the 20th century.

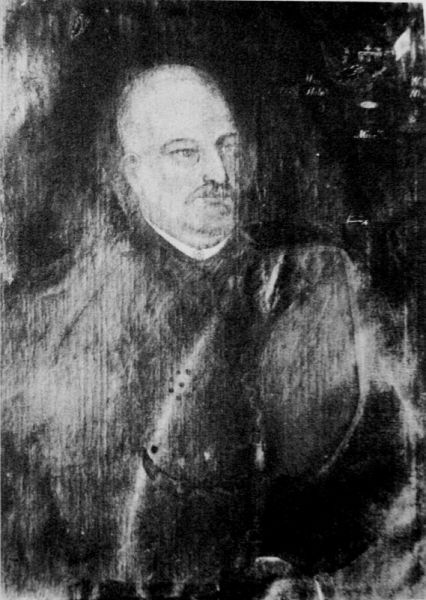
Marcin Wołodkowicz (c. 1565–1640s), land judge of Minsk

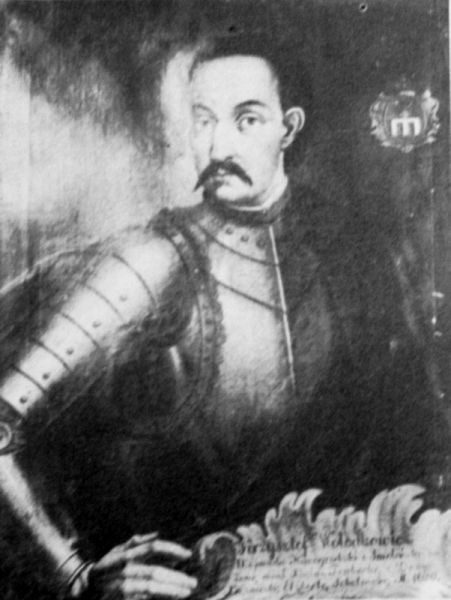
Krzysztof Wołodkowicz (c. 1590–1670), voivode of Nowogródek

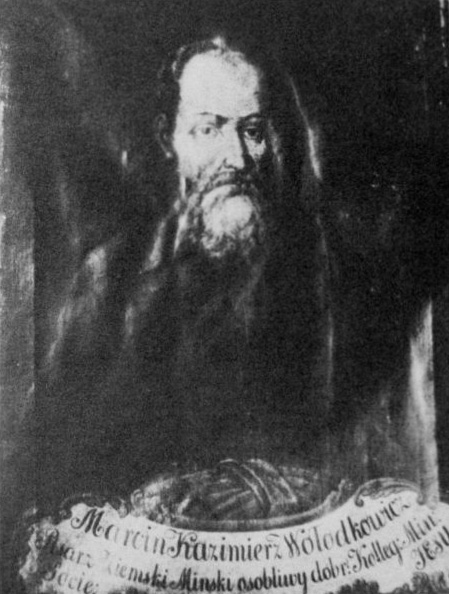
Marcin Kazimierz Wołodkowicz (c. 1640–1716), land clerk of Minsk

Krzysztof's daughter, Zofia Konstancja Wołodkowicz, married Aleksander Hilary Połubiński, Grand Marshal of Lithuania. Their daughter Anna Marianna Połubińska married Prince Dominik Mikołaj Radziwiłł, later Grand Chancellor of Lithuania, on 11 October 1672.

Another daughter, Izabela Helena Połubińska, married Jerzy Stanisław Sapieha, linking the family to two of the principal magnate houses of the Grand Duchy of Lithuania.

=== 18th century ===
Michał Wołodkowicz (1735–1760), a friend and kinsman of Karol Stanisław Radziwiłł, was known to contemporaries for his physical strength and courage and for his drinking and brawling. On 1 February 1760 he broke up a session of the Lithuanian Tribunal in Minsk while drunk, attacking the deputies with his sabre and wounding one of them in the hand.

The Tribunal sentenced him to death on 12 February, without allowing him counsel, and he was shot by the Tribunal's infantry that night, as rumours reached the town that Radziwiłł was marching to rescue him.

The episode entered Polish literature through Adam Mickiewicz's epic Pan Tadeusz (1834). In Book VI the court usher (woźny) Protazy, hiding in a hemp field, recalls serving a summons on Wołodkowicz:

Polish original

Jak później Wołodkowicz, pan dumny, zuchwały,
Co rozpędzał sejmiki, gwałcił trybunały,
Przyjąwszy urzędowy pozew, zdarł na sztuki
I postawiwszy przy drzwiach z kijami hajduki,
Sam nad Woźnego głową trzymał goły rapier,
Krzycząc: "Albo cię zetnę, albo zjedz twój papier!"
Woźny niby jeść zaczął, jak człowiek roztropny,
Aż skradłszy się do okna, wpadł w ogród konopny.

— Adam Mickiewicz, Pan Tadeusz
Book VI
Translation:
English translation

How later Wolodkowicz, a proud lord,
And insolent, who Diets would disperse,
And violate tribunals; and when he
Received official summons, tore the paper,
And placing heyduks at the door with sticks,
Himself upraised above the Wozny's head
His naked rapier, crying, "Either die,
Or eat thy paper." So the Wozny made
As he would eat it, like a prudent man;
Till, stealing to the window, in the garden
Of hemp he entered.

— Translated by Maude Ashurst Biggs (1885)

A note to the poem adds that Wołodkowicz, "after making several disturbances, was seized in Minsk, and shot by a tribunal decree".

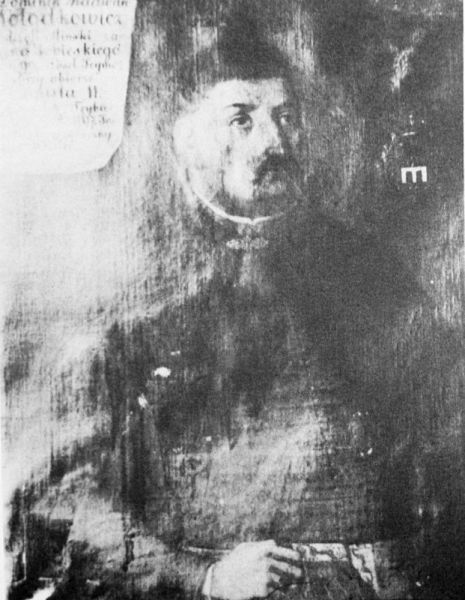
Dominik Wołodkowicz (fl. 1697–1724)

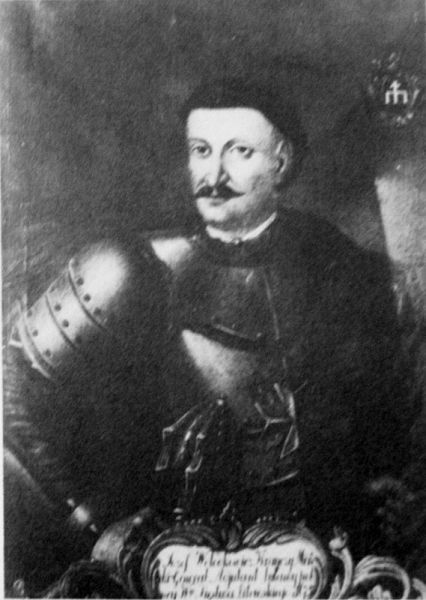
Józef Wołodkowicz

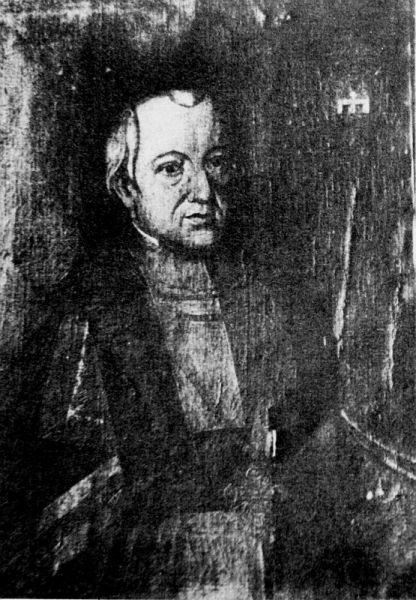
Felicjan Filip Wołodkowicz (1697–1778), Metropolitan of Kiev

Rejtan, or the Fall of Poland (1866) by Jan Matejko, depicting the protest of Tadeusz Rejtan at the Partition Sejm of 1773. Rejtan's mother belonged to the Wołodkowicz family.

At the Partition Sejm of 1773, Tadeusz Wołodkowicz (fl. 1763–1777), the krajczy (carver) of Minsk and a deputy representing the Minsk Voivodeship, was among the parliamentarians whom Tadeusz Rejtan (1742–1780) sought to rally in opposition to the First Partition of Poland. Rejtan was related to the Wołodkowicz family through his mother, Teresa Wołodkowicz. Wołodkowicz subsequently served on the parliamentary delegation appointed to negotiate with the partitioning powers. Rejtan's protest was later immortalised in Matejko's painting Rejtan (1866). Following the partitions, the family's estates came under the rule of the partitioning powers.

=== 19th century ===
Members of the family participated in both the Kościuszko Uprising of 1794 and the November Uprising of 1830-1831. Defeat in both cases brought confiscations and exile. Jan Henryk Wołodkowicz (1765-1825), who emigrated to France after 1794, rose to the rank of general in the French Army and founded the French branch of the family. His name has been associated with the inscription 'HENRY' on the Arc de Triomphe in Paris. (Note: The inscription "HENRY" on the western pillar of the Arc de Triomphe has also been attributed to Colonel Claude François Henry (1773–1812). The commission never published a definitive identification of the persons intended.) Alexander Wołodkowicz(1806-1862) led the uprising in the Vileika district in 1830-1831.

After its defeat he died in exile in Paris, his heart being returned to the family chapel at Radaszkowice.

Jan Henryk Wołodkowicz (1765–1825)

Marie Thérèse Wołodkowicz (née Lasseray), second wife of Jan Henryk Wołodkowicz

Jan Henryk's second wife was Marie Thérèse Lasseray, daughter of the Parisian merchant Jacques Ambroise Lasseray. The marriage connected the general to influential circles of French society. Their son, Alexandre Henryk Wołodkowicz (1805–1875), became a French financial administrator and was appointed a knight of the Legion of Honour.

Members of the family held prominent positions both in the Catholic and Uniate church. Jakub Wołodkowicz was rector of the Jesuit College in Polotsk, Anna abbess of the Benedictine monastery in Minsk and Felicjan Filip Wołodkowicz (1697-1778) Metropolitan of Kiev. Members of the Wołodkowicz family founded several monasteries and churches, such as a monastery and a seven domed church in Grozovo, a monastery in Navadvorcy, the Carmelite church in Minsk, the cathedral of Chelm, a church in Zary, a church in Radaškonys and a Russian Orthodox church in Čašnikai.

In 1885, the Polish society painter Kazimierz Pochwalski painted a portrait titled Portrait of Włodzimierz Wołodkowicz, now held by the National Museum in Kraków (inventory no. MNK II-a-716).

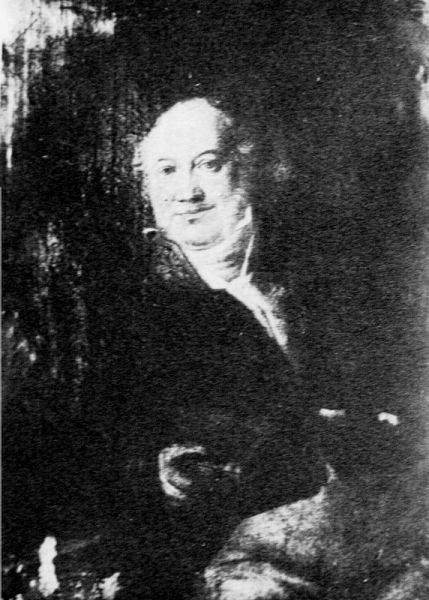
Kacper Melchior Wołodkowicz

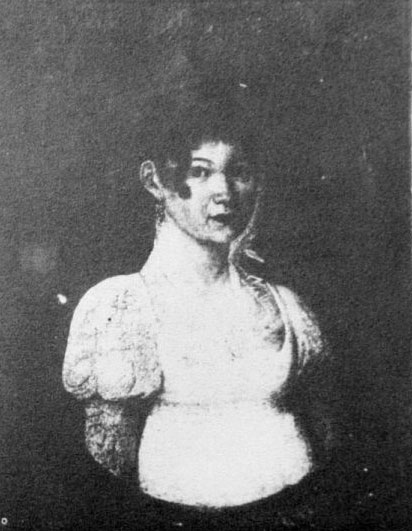
Teresa Wołodkowicz (née Wańkowicz; born c. 1780)

Władysław Wołodkowicz, portrait by Kazimierz Pochwalski (1885)

During the late 19th century, members of the Wołodkowicz family became prominent patrons of the arts and charitable institutions in Kraków and Odesa. Władysław Wołodkowicz (1832–1889), a landowner and philanthropist born in Gródek, Podolia, settled in Kraków with his wife Zofia (née Idl; died 1900) and their son Bolesław (died 1897). The family maintained close connections with the painter Jan Matejko, whose works were collected by Władysław and his brother Konstanty. Władysław also served as the model for Chancellor Jan Łaski in Matejko's painting Prussian Homage.

Konstanty Wołodkowicz, Władysław's elder brother, owned estates and industrial enterprises in Ukraine. He founded the Catholic Charitable Society in Odesa in 1882 and financially supported the construction of a Catholic church there. In Kraków, he financed monuments to the poet Józef Bohdan Zaleski, erected in 1886, and the playwright Aleksander Fredro, erected in 1900. He was also the principal benefactor of Kraków's first student residence, opened in December 1904. His charitable bequests supported educational, cultural and scientific institutions, including the Academy of Learning in Kraków and scholarships for Ruthenian students at the University of Lwów.

Zofia Wołodkowicz was an active patron of cultural and charitable institutions in Kraków. Following the death of her only son Bolesław in 1897, she donated works from his art collection to the Jan Matejko House, the Czartoryski Museum and the Kraków School of Fine Arts. Her gifts included a preparatory sketch for Matejko's Jan III Sobieski at Vienna and a chair designed after a model by the artist. She was also a major benefactor of the Sister Servants of the Most Sacred Heart of Jesus, helping finance their convent and church in Kraków.

Wołodkowiczów Manor in Odessa, c. 1890

In June 1900, Zofia Wołodkowicz was murdered aboard a train while returning from Odesa to Kraków. The killing attracted considerable attention in the contemporary Polish press, but the perpetrators were never identified. Her will directed the proceeds from the sale of her Kraków properties to charitable purposes. She was buried alongside her husband and son at Rakowicki Cemetery on 23 February 1901.

The family was also connected to the novelist Henryk Sienkiewicz through his second wife, Maria Romanowska-Wołodkowicz, the adopted daughter of Konstanty Wołodkowicz and his wife Helena (née Drzewiecka). Their marriage took place in 1893, following an acquaintance that included meetings at the Wołodkowicz residence in Kraków.

=== Russian Revolution and exile ===
In 1886, Wincenty Wołodkowicz (1846–1927) established the Skina paper and cardboard mill in Chashniki, on the site of an earlier watermill. The factory expanded over the following decades, becoming one of the larger paper mills in the Belarusian provinces of the Russian Empire. It was nationalised in October 1918 and renamed Krasnaya Zvezda ("Red Star") in 1923.

The family's Iwansk estate had maintained a renowned stud farm, whose racehorses won prizes in Moscow and Saint Petersburg. Wincenty arrived in Warsaw by carriage, accompanied by horses brought from Iwansk, which he subsequently sold.

The newer Wołodkowicz residence at Iwańsk, built at the end of the 19th century (undated photograph)

Following the Russian Revolution of 1917, the Iwansk estate was nationalised, ending generations of family ownership. Wincenty and his wife Zofia fled to Poland. The couple eventually settled in Bydgoszcz, where Wincenty died in 1927. Their son Gustaw, husband of Izabella Morsztyn, also emigrated to Poland.

=== World War II resistance and postwar history ===
Following her husband Gustaw's death in 1933, Izabella Wołodkowicz (née Morsztyn) moved with her children into the Warsaw residence of her brother, Paweł Morsztyn (1888–1940), at 40 Mokotowska Street. Paweł later served as Chief of Protocol for the Polish government-in-exile led by General Władysław Sikorski in France.

During the German occupation of Poland, Izabella sheltered Jewish children at the family home. The household also bleached children's hair to disguise their appearance before arranging for their placement, under false identities, with the Sisters of the Immaculate Conception, a Polish Catholic teaching congregation.

Izabella's cousin Maria Lisowska-Wołodkowicz, provided shelter and employment to a Jewish woman living under a false identity.

Wincenty Wołodkowicz (1919-1944), Izabella's son, was active in Żegota, an underground Polish resistance organisation established in 1942 to rescue Jews. He helped Jews obtain false identity documents and also worked on an underground newspaper. He was executed by German forces on Szucha Avenue in Warsaw, where the Gestapo maintained its headquarters, on 12 August 1944, eleven days after the outbreak of the Warsaw Uprising.

Wincenty's uncle and Izabella's brother-in-law, Ignacy Wołodkowicz (1882–1944), was a lawyer arrested during the German persecution of Polish intellectuals in 1942. He was murdered by the Gestapo in Słonim on the night of 3–4 July 1944.

For their efforts to rescue Jews during the German occupation of Poland, Izabella Wołodkowicz and Maria Lisowska-Wołodkowicz were recognised by Yad Vashem as Righteous Among the Nations on 10 June 1982. The distinction honours non-Jews who risked their lives to save Jews during the Holocaust.

Ceremony in Honor of Izabella and Maria Wołodkowicz, Andrzej Wołodkowicz, 1982, Embassy of Israel in Ottawa

On 13 December 1983, the medals were presented posthumously at a ceremony at the Israeli Embassy in Ottawa, Canada, where Maria's son, Andrzej Wołodkowicz (1928–1995), accepted them on behalf of both women.

Izabella's daughter, Elżbieta Wołodkowicz, married Franciszek Dzierżykraj-Morawski, who served as Poland's ambassador to the Netherlands from 1991 to 1994, following the fall of communism.

== Coat of arms ==
The Wołodkowicz family bore a variant of the Radwan coat of arms known as Radwan odmienny, traditionally depicted with a princely mantle and mitre (mitra książęca).

The family's traditionally attributed motto was Gloria tibi Domine (Latin for "Glory to You, Lord").

Wołodkowicz coat of arms (Radwan odmienny), depicted on a 19th-century porcelain table service

According to the heraldist Teodor Żychliński, the arms were originally regarded as a distinct family coat of arms (herb własny) before being classified as a variant of Radwan. The family's association with Radwan was documented by at least 1743, when Kasper Niesiecki distinguished Wołodkowicz lineages bearing the Radwan and Łabędź coats of arms.

Drawing on an earlier description attributed to Karłowicz and Niesiecki, Żychliński recorded an older design featuring two anchors arranged in the shape of the letter H, surmounted by a cross and a rooster holding a ring in its beak, on a red field. The arms were accompanied by a princely mantle and mitre as external ornaments.

The princely insignia were associated with the family's traditional claim of descent from Lithuanian princes. Żychliński reported that the family's proof of nobility (wywód szlachecki), examined by the Imperial Heraldry Department in Saint Petersburg, described its ancestry as od kniaziów pochodzący ("descended from princes"). The precise line of descent nevertheless remained uncertain.

Żychliński distinguished Radwan odmienny from the Łabędź coat of arms (Swan), borne by another family named Wołodkowicz or Wołodkiewicz in Samogitia. That family's nobility was confirmed by Russian imperial decree on 6 November 1849, and its arms did not feature the princely mitre. Żychliński suggested that the two families might have descended from different ancestors.

== Branches ==
There are several branches of the Wołodkowicz family:

- "Gałąź Nowodworska" (Branch of Nowy Dwor)
- "Gałąź Iwanska" (Branch of Iwansk)
- "Gałąź Francuska" (French branch)
- "Gałąź Ukrainska" (Ukrainian branch)
- "Gałąź Galicyjska" (Galician branch)

The Wołodkowicz family was connected by marriage to the principal noble and princely families of the Polish-Lithuanian Commonwealth, including Drucki-Horski, Drucki-Podbereski, Drucki-Lubecki, Pac, Podhorski, Połubiński, Puzyna, Reytan, Radziwiłł, Sapieha and Tyszkiewicz.

== Notable members ==
- Krzysztof Wołodkowicz (fl. 1600-1670), wojewode of Nowogródek and Minsk and senator of the Lithuanian-Polish Commonwealth in the second half of the 17th century. Writer of historical books like 'The history of Inflant Wars', 'The life of prince Casimir' and 'On incorporation of the inflants by king Sigismund August'. Krzystof Wołodkowicz was very handsome and the Sultan of the Ottoman Empire commissioned Krzystof's portrait for his palace in Istanbul. Married to 1. Halszka princess Drucka-Sokolinska and 2. Izabela princess Massalska.
- Felicjan Filip Wołodkowicz (1697-1778), Uniate bishop of Chełm, bishop of Volodymyr-Volynskyi, and Metropolitan of Kiev, Galicia and all Rus from 1762. Grand-uncle of Tadeusz Rejtan.
- Michał Wołodkowicz (1735-1760), landowner, notable for extraordinay physical force and courage. Fought bears with a wooden fork only. He is mentioned in Book VI "Pan Tadeusz" by Adam Mickiewicz as a man standing above the law. Sentenced to death for his improper behaviour.
- Jan Henryk Wołodkowicz (1765-1825), general in the French Army, aide de camp of Napoleon. Commander of the 2e Legion du Nord. Founder of the French branch. Married to 1. Anna Ferguson-Tepper, 2. Thérèse de Lasseray.
- Wincenty Wołodkowicz (1761-1838), chamberlain of king Stanislaw August, marshall of the nobility of Borisov. Founder of the branch from Iwansk, Married to 1. Teresa Przezdziecka 2. countess Jadwiga Tyszkiewicz.
- Emanuel Ignacy Wołodkowicz (1805-1852), landowner, entrepreneur. Married to 1. Victoria princess Drucka-Lubecka, 2. Alina princess Drucka-Lubecka.
- Alexander Wołodkowicz(1806-1862), commander during the uprising Russia of 1830-1831, diplomat. Author of "Ni paix, ni sécurité pour l'Europe avec la Russie" (Paris 1855)
- Wincenty Wołodkowicz (1846-1927), last owner of Iwansk, landowner, entrepreneur, State counsellor of the Russian Empire, honorary judge of the province of Lepel. Married to Sophia baroness Hartingh.

== Estates and properties ==
The Wołodkowicz family held a cluster of estates in the eastern borderlands of the Polish-Lithuanian Commonwealth, among others:

Burdykowszczyzna manor

=== Sienna, Burdykowszczyzna and Mielachowicze ===
Sienna was the birthplace of Jan Henryk Wolodkowicz. The neighbouring estates of Burdykowszczyzna and Mielachowicze formed part of the same landholding. Following Jan Henryk’s participation in the Kościuszko Uprising, the estates were sequestered by the tsarist authorities. No traces of the manors survive.

=== Nowy Dwór ===
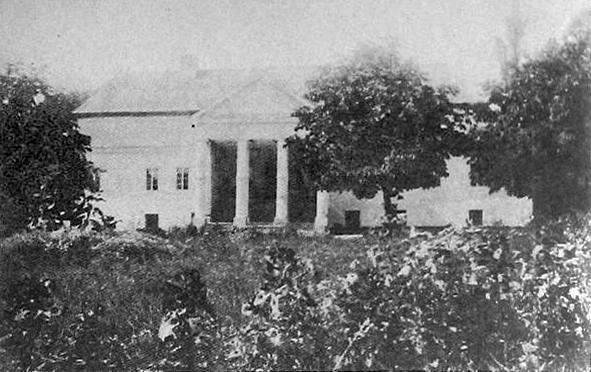
Nowy Dwór manor, c. 1914

Nowy Dwór was held by the family from at least 1695, when Marcin Kazimierz Wołodkowicz, chamberlain of Minsk, is recorded as owner. The manor housed a portrait collection attributed to the painter Jan Krzysztof Damel. No traces of the manor survive.

=== Iwansk ===
In the 19th century, the branch of Iwansk became the most prominent of all branches of the Wołodkowicz family. Iwansk together with neighbouring villages was bought by Tadeusz Wołodkowicz in 1774. This was to become the main, though not the oldest, domain of this branch of the family. Owing to entrepreneurship and fortune the wealth of the Iwansk branch further increased during the next generations. Two years later Iwansk was inherited by his brother Wincenty (1761-1839) chamberlain of Frederick Augustus I of Saxony, who passed his properties to Emanuel Ignacy.

The newer Wołodkowicz residence at Iwańsk, built at the end of the 19th century (undated photograph)

Last owner of Iwansk was the son of Emanuel Ignacy, Wincenty Wołodkowicz (1846-1927). In 1917 his estates (Iwansk, Kopciowicze, Czaszniki, Solomerecze, Wojsznarowo, Podolanka, Stare Siolo, Krasne Siolo, Imszarki, Slobodka, Hatsyanava, Fedzki, Tovpentsy, Naviny, Vishanki, Pachaevici, Demidovichi, Prystoi, Medvedsk, Krasnitsa, Punki, Smolance and Deksniany) made about 75,000 dessiatines, including more than 20 towns and villages, as well as a paper mill ('Skinia'), mills, distillery plants, breweries, a brickyard and a glass factory.

Iwansk had a famous stable of horses, which won prizes at races in Moscow and St. Petersburg. The palace housed a notable private archive and art collection. During the revolution of 1917, Wincenty Wołodkowicz escaped to Poland, where he died in Bydgoszcz in 1927. Only partial ruins survive today.

=== The Wołodkowicz Palace in Krakow ===
Wołodkowicz Palace in Kraków, 2022

In 1884, Władysław Wołodkowicz purchased a palace at ul. Lubicz 4 in Kraków, commissioning architects Tadeusz Stryjeński and Władysław Ekielski to rebuild it in the French eclectic style. The Radwan coat of arms remains visible on the attic facade. The building is listed as a heritage monument and currently houses a commercial premises.
