= Józef Bonawentura Załuski =

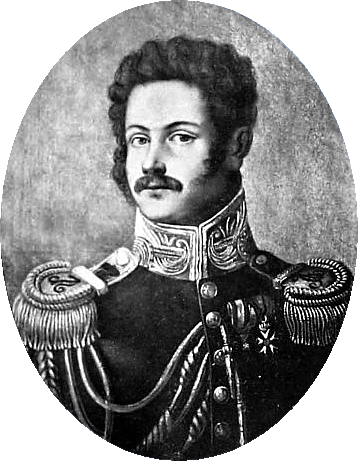
J.B. Załuski, c. 1825

Józef Bonawentura Ignacy Załuski (14 July 1787 – 25 April 1866) was a Polish General Officer and diarist, and participant in the Napoleonic Wars of 1808–1814.

== Biography ==
Załuski was born on 14 July 1787 in Ojców.

From 1807 he was a member of the French Army and participated in wars with Spain (1808–1811) and with Austria (1809). He also participated in the Moscow campaign (1812) and later in battles in Germany and France. From 1815 he was in the army of the Kingdom of Poland and then he became an adjutant of Nicholas I and Alexander I. From 1826 to 1830 he was a curator of Free City of Kraków schools.

After resignation in 1829 he became a curator of Jagiellonian University (until 1830). During the November Uprising (1830–1831) he was a director of intelligence and division commander in Polish Army. After the uprising he lived in Galicia. During the Revolutions of 1848 Załuski was a commander of National Guard in Lviv.

Załuski died on 25 April 1866 in Kraków.

== Selected works ==
Diaries

- Wspomnienia w skróceniu z r. 1831... (1860)
- Wspomnienia o pułku lekkokonnym Gwardii Napoleona I... (1862)
- Wspomnienia o pułku lekkokonnym polskim (1865)
