= Świny, Lower Silesian Voivodeship =

Świny
- Village
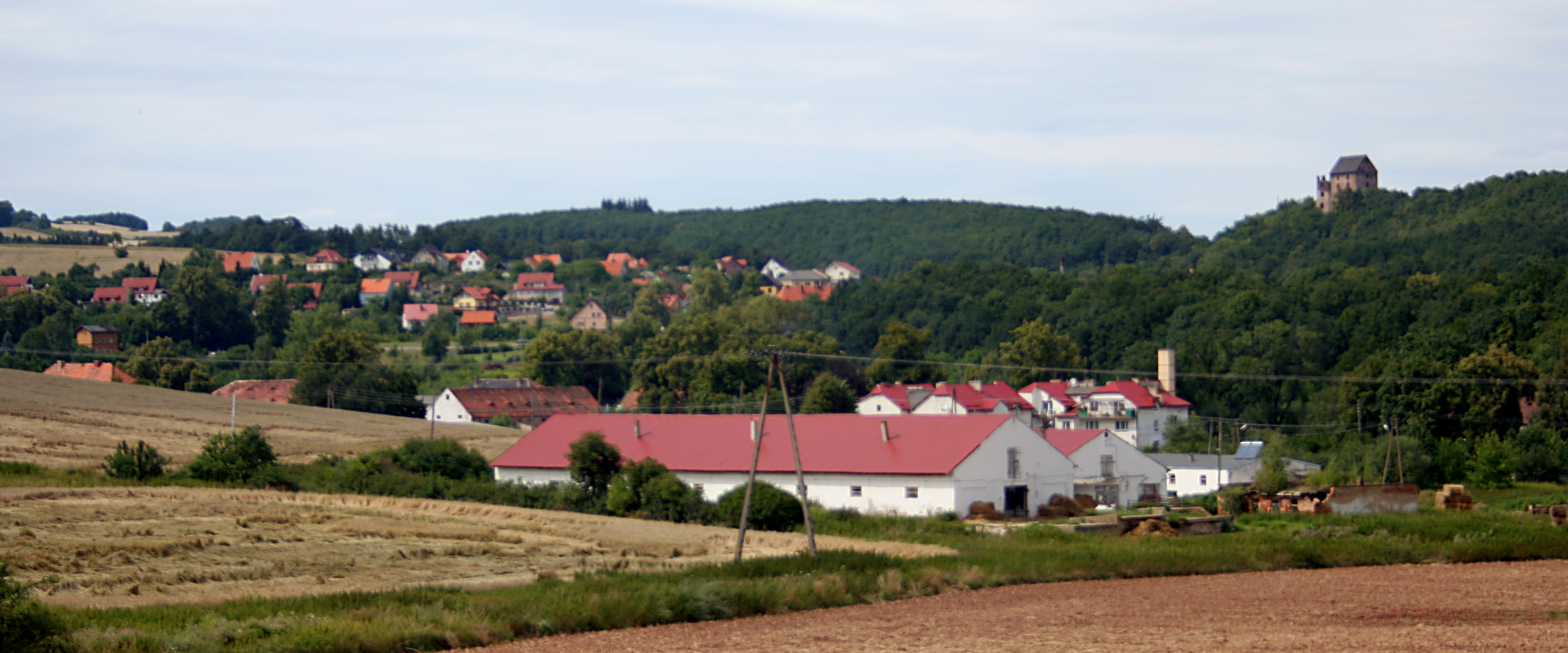

- Location within Poland
- Coordinates: 50°56′0″N 16°06′00″E
- Country: Poland
- Voivodeship: Lower Silesian
- Powiat: Jawor
- Gmina: Bolków
- Population: 280

Świny [ˈɕfinɨ] is a village in the administrative district of Gmina Bolków, within Jawor County, Lower Silesian Voivodeship, in south-western Poland.

== Geography ==
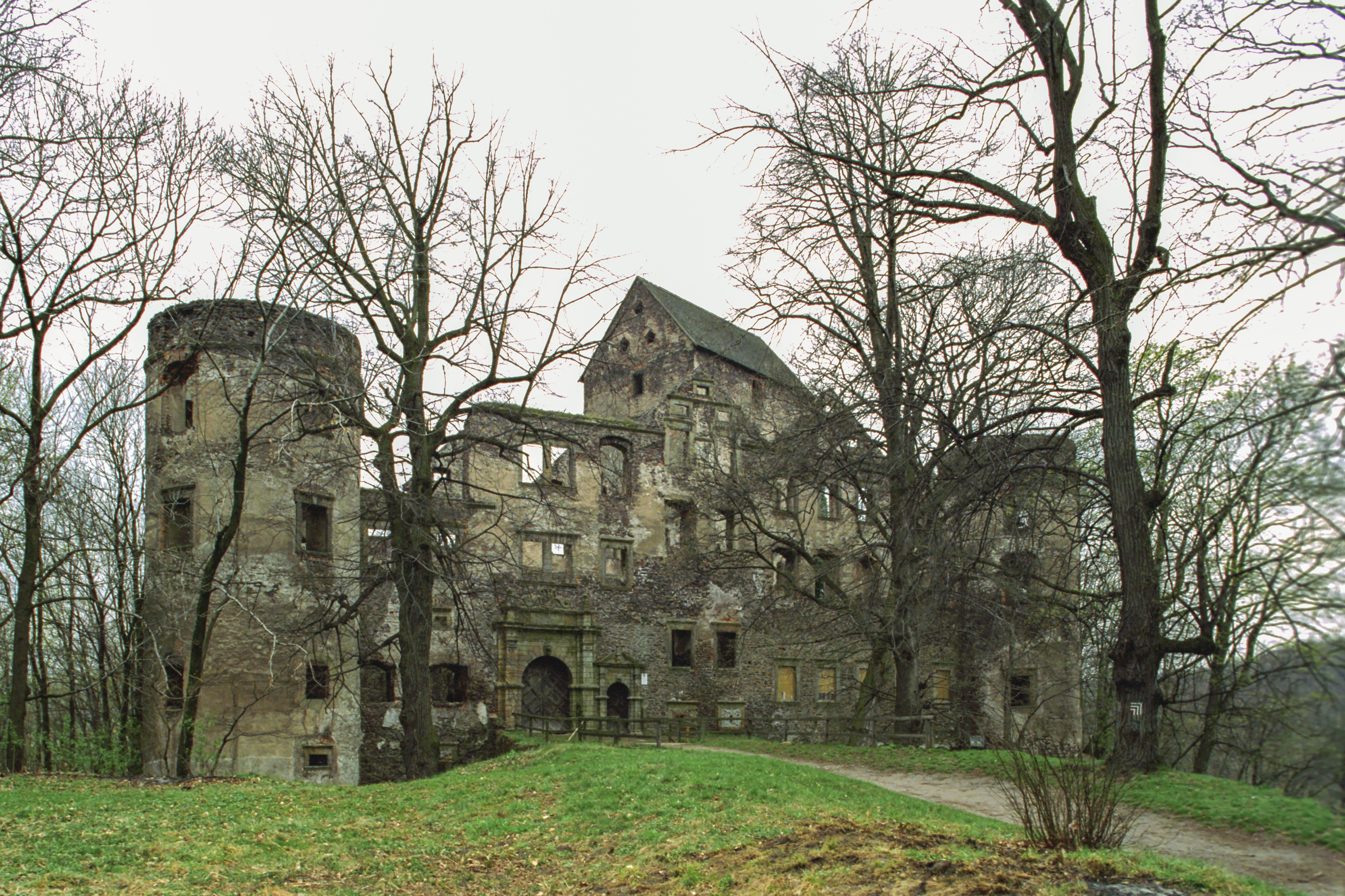
Castle ruins

It lies in the Lower Silesia region on the Polish National road 3 north-east of Bolków.

== History ==
A settlement on the historic road leading from the Kingdom of Poland across the Western Sudetes to the Duchy of Bohemia already existed in the 10th/11th century. According to legend, a Bohemian knight Biwoy about 716 killed a wild boar ("swine") by his own hand and dedicated it to the Přemyslid ancestress Libuše, wherefore he received her sister Kazi's hand and was enfeoffed with the surrounding estates. Indeed, the forebears of the local Lords of Świny (Schweinichen) may have established themselves in the area when Silesia came under the rule of the Piast duke Mieszko I of Poland.

Świny Castle was first documented in 1108 by the medieval chronicler Cosmas of Prague, author of the Chronica Boemorum, who mentioned one Voivode Mutina of the Vršovci dynasty meeting his uncle Nemoy at Castrum Suini in Poloniae to plot against Duke Svatopluk of Bohemia. Suini is thereby the oldest known castle in Lower Silesia. It again appeared as Zpini in an 1155 deed issued by Pope Adrian IV.

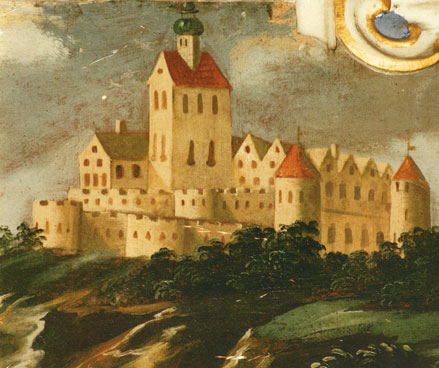
Świny Castle, 1655 depiction

From the 13th century on, Świny apparently was the administrative seat of a Polish castellany on the trade route from the Silesian capital Wrocław across the Bohemian border at Kamienna Góra to Trutnov and Prague. A parish church is first documented in 1313. However, over the centuries it lost its meaning, after the Silesian duke Bolesław II Rogatka about 1270 erected neighbouring Bolków Castle, and the castellany was relocated by the Silesian Piast dukes of Jawor and Świdnica. Nevertheless, Świny, spared from demolitions in both the Hussite Wars and the Thirty Years' War, remained one of the largest castle complexes in the Silesian lands.

In the 16th century the members of the Schweinichen noble family hosted a circle of mystics, among them Jakob Böhme, Abraham von Franckenberg and Angelus Silesius. Plundered by Russian troops in the Seven Years' War, the castle was put up for compulsory sale in 1769. It was later held by the Austrian House of Hoyos and rapidly decayed.
