= Józef Zajączek =

Polish general and politician (1752–1826)

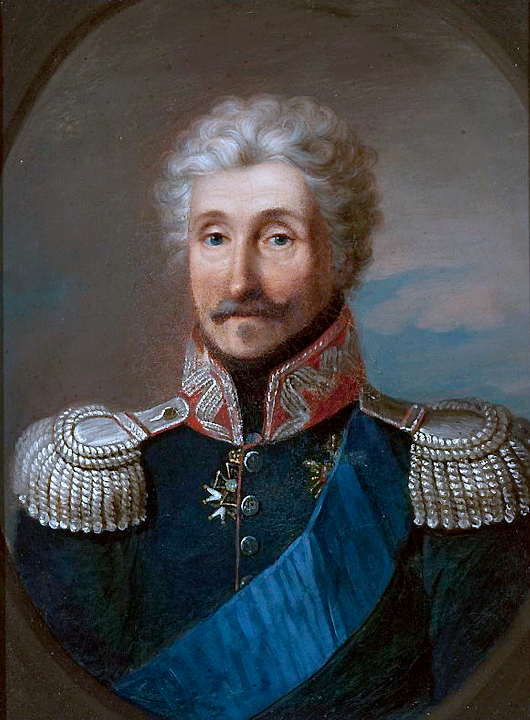
- Born: 1 November 1752; Kamieniec Podolski, Polish–Lithuanian Commonwealth
- Died: 28 July 1826 (aged 73); Warsaw, Congress Poland, Russian Empire
- Military career
- Allegiance: Polish–Lithuanian Commonwealth; First French Republic; First French Empire; Congress Poland
- Branch: Polish–Lithuanian Army; French Revolutionary Army; Napoleonic Army; Imperial Russian Army
- Service years: 1768–1826
- Rank: General
- Conflicts: Polish–Russian War of 1792; Battle of Zieleńce; Kościuszko Uprising; Battle of Racławice; Battle of Gołków; Defense of Praga; French Revolutionary Wars; French campaign in Egypt and Syria; Battle of Sédiman; Napoleonic Wars
- Awards: Legion of Honour; Order of St. George; Order of the White Eagle
- Other work: Viceroy of Poland

Prince Józef Zajączek (Polish: [ˈjuzɛf zaˈjɔntʂɛk]; 1 November 1752 – 28 July 1826) was a Polish general and politician.

Zajączek started his career in the Army of the Polish–Lithuanian Commonwealth, an aide-de-camp to hetman Franciszek Ksawery Branicki. He was Branicki's supporter on the political scene, before joining the liberal opposition during the Great Sejm in 1790. He became a radical supporter of the Constitution of 3 May 1791. As a military commander, in the rank of a general, he participated in Polish–Russian War of 1792 and Kościuszko Uprising. After the partitions of Poland, he joined the Napoleonic Army, and was a general in Napoleon's forces until his wounding and capture during Napoleon's invasion of Russia in 1812. From 1815 he became involved in the governance of the Congress Kingdom of Poland, becoming its first Viceroy (Namestnik).

== Youth ==
Świnka coat of arms of the Zajączek family

Józef Zajączek was born on 1 November 1752 in Kamieniec Podolski to Antoni Zajączek and Marianna Cieszkowska, members of the Polish noble family of the Świnka. Young Zajączek probably attended a school in Zamość, and later a Jesuit school in Warsaw.

At the age of sixteen he joined the Bar Confederates, and served as a secretary to Michał Wielhorski, accompanying him on his diplomatic mission to Paris, France, in 1770. Zajączek stayed in Paris for several years, and in 1773 he met one of the major leaders of the Confederacy, Casimir Pulaski. Falling under Pulaski's influence, he left Wielhorski's service, and accompanied Pulaski on his diplomatic mission to the Ottoman Empire in 1774, where he witnessed the Ottoman defeat at the Battle of Kozludzha on 20 June. Returning to France later that year he wrote a hagiographic biography of Pulaski in French. In 1775 he got an officer (junior lieutenant) position in the hussar regiment of the French Army, although after several weeks he abandoned this position to return to Poland. Thanks to the support from the magnate Sapieha family he received a post of an aide-de-camp to hetman Franciszek Ksawery Branicki.

Zajączek participated as a deputy from the Podole Voivodeship in the Sejm (parliament of the Commonwealth) session of 1784, and was a vocal member of the hetman Branicki's faction (known as the Hetmans' Party). In a similar vein he participated in the Sejm of 1786, this time as a deputy from the Kiev Voivodeship. During that time he emerged as a vocal critic of king Stanisław August Poniatowski. In late 1786 he married Aleksandra Iaura, née de Pernet. Meanwhile, he kept being promoted in ranks, reaching that of colonel in 1787. He was also not a deputy to the first half of the Four-year Sejm (1788–1792), and spent the first two years of its deliberations with his unit (2nd Front Guard Regiment, Polish: 2 regiment straży przedniej) on the Ukrainian border; in 1790, however, he was elected as a deputy once again and joined his patron Branicki in Warsaw. Soon, however, he left Branicki's camp, joining the faction of Hugo Kołłątaj, the Patriotic Party. Zajączek became involved in the works of a commission tasked with reforming the Polish military, and contributed to a new project on military exercises and officer training. He became one of the supporters of the new Constitution of 3 May 1791, and members of the Friends of the Constitution society.

== Military career ==
=== In the Commonwealth's army ===
Displeased with reforms in Poland that were threatening its influence there, Russia invaded Poland in May 1792, starting the Polish–Russian War of 1792. Two weeks before the war started, on 4 May Zajączek became the commander of the 3rd Front Guard Regiment (3 regiment straży przedniej). On 26 May he was given command over a reserve corps, and on 29 May he was promoted to the rank of major general. After gathering some troops near Lublin, he departed towards Dubno, which he reached on 7 June. He was one of the Polish commanders at the victorious battle of Zieleńce, for which he received the highest decoration of the Polish military, Virtuti Militari, becoming the fifth person to receive this award, instituted just that year. He took part in some minor skirmishes, but did not participate in any significant battle before Stanisław August Poniatowski surrendered to the enemy, joining the Targowica Confederation. The war ended without any decisive battles, with the Polish army still in the fighting condition, not suffering from any major defeat nor from lack of supplies. Angered at the king's betrayal, Zajączek was one of the main proponents of the plan to kidnap the king; the plan, however, never came to fruition. Like many other dissatisfied officers, including Prince Poniatowski and Tadeusz Kościuszko, Zajączek requested a discharge from the army; his resignation was accepted on 18 August.

Shortly afterward Zajączek left the country, heading to Vienna. In August 1793 he moved to Leipzig, joining a number of other Polish emigres, namely Kościuszko and Kołlątaj, preparing for a new war. Soon he became one of the major planners of this approaching conflict, often tasked with delivering important messages to Poland, and collecting information there; in particular he was active in Warsaw, and Kościuszko planned for him to become a commander of that region. Zajączek also went on missions to Dresden and Paris. During that time, he became known as a radical revolutionary, democrat and proponent of abolishing serfdom in Poland. In April he joined the "club of Polish Jacobins".

Shortly after the Kościuszko Uprising began in March 1794, Zajączek joined Kościuszko in Luborzyca on 2 April. Zajączek was given the command of the Lesser Poland Division, and on 4 April he took part in battle of Racławice, which concluded with a major Polish victory. On 6 April he was promoted to lieutenant general. Over the next few weeks Zajączek accompanied Kościuszko and his staff. On 8 June he was defeated at the battle of Chełm and retreated toward Lublin. He lost support among the troops, and faced a mutiny, eventually quelled by Kościuszko, on 10 June. In mid June Zajączek's forces merged with those of Kościuszko. He commanded the forces in the inconclusive battle of Gołków on 9–10 July, and soon after he was one of the Polish commanders of the defense of Warsaw that lasted from mid July until early September. In the following few weeks Zajączek became one of the members of the Supreme National Council, and a president of its Criminal Court. He was a commander of the defense of Warsaw during the disastrous battle of Praga of 4 November. During the battle Zajączek was wounded and retreated from the battle even before the conflict was over. He has been criticised for his insufficient preparation for the defense of Warsaw against Russian invasion, and for poor leadership during the battle. Zajączek escaped to Polish Galicia where he was interned by Austrians. He was released one year later, moving to Paris.

=== In Napoleon's army ===
In Paris, Zajączek quickly became involved with the active emigre groups there. Hoping to sway revolutionary France into supporting the Polish cause, many Poles, including him, volunteered to join the French Revolutionary Army, eventually leading to the creation of the Polish Legions in Italy led by Jan Henryk Dąbrowski, which became a part of Napoleon's army. On 8 March 1797 Napoleon ordered that Zajączek should be recognized as an active brigade general of the French army. That year he published a brochure on his experiences of the 1794 war, Histoire de la révolution de Pologne en 1794, in which he tried to justify his actions. Zajączek was, however, still unpopular among the Polish troops, many of whom blamed him for the fall of Praga; due to frequent personal conflicts, Zajączek chose to remain with the French army, rather than joining the Legions themselves. Over the coming years, he took part in the French Revolutionary Wars. He took part in the 1798 Egyptian Expedition. There he also served as a governor of several provinces, first, from July that year, of the Monufia Governorate, later, from January 1799, simultaneously of the Faiyum Governorate and Beni Suef Governorate. On 25 January 1800 he defeated Murad Bey at the Battle of Sédiman. In 1801 he was promoted to division general, and later took part in the failed defense of Alexandria.

In 1802 Zajączek became the commander of the French 2nd Division. In 1803 he received the Knight's Cross of the Legion of Honour; a year later, the Commander's Cross. In 1805 during the War of the Third Coalition he was assigned to the French Army of the Rhine, where he worked at army's High Command. Next year in September, during the War of the Fourth Coalition, he was assigned to command of the foreign (mostly Polish) Northern Legions; in the following month he organized another similar unit, the Kalisz Legion. In 1808 those units were reorganized into parts of the Army of the Duchy of Warsaw, in which Zajączek became a general. During that time, dissatisfied with his transfer from the French army, and being made subject to Prince Józef Poniatowski whom he disliked, he refused to wear a Polish uniform and swear an oath to the Duchy, and was forced to do so only on direct orders of French marshal Louis-Nicolas Davout. In 1809 he commanded several formations in the Polish–Austrian War, where he failed to distinguish himself, instead suffering the only significant defeat in this campaign at the battle of Jedlińsk on 11 June. He remained in the Army after the war, commanding the Polish 2nd Division, and organizing the troops for the expected conflict with Russia.

During Napoleon's Invasion of Russia in 1812, Zajączek commanded the 16th Infantry Division of the V Corps in la Grande Armée. His division performed well at the battle of Smolensk in August where he was wounded, recuperating till October. He rejoined his unit in the time to take part in the battle of Tarutino. After Prince Poniatowski, commander of the V Corps, was wounded, from 1 November Zajączek took charge of that formation. He led it at the battle of Vyazma and battle of Krasnoi until a wound at Berezina claimed his leg, which was amputated by doctor Dominique Jean Larrey. While recuperating from the wound he was taken prisoner by the Imperial Russian Army in Wilno (Vilnius).

Zajączek's name is found on the Arc de Triomphe in Paris.

== Prince and namestnik ==
Zajączek was imprisoned in the Poltava fortress until January 1814, and then remanded to Białystok. After that, in July 1814, he was returned to Warsaw. There he was assigned to the post of a deputy president of a Military Commission, reorganizing the former Napoleonic Army of the Duchy of Warsaw into a new, Russian-controlled Army of the Congress Poland.

Russian tsar Alexander I, also newly crowned King of Poland, gave Zajączek on 3 December 1815 the position of the first Namestnik of Kingdom of Poland (tsar's deputized ruler of the territory, a position similar to that of a viceroy). This nomination surprised many, including Zajączek himself, who is said to have at first refused this position, but in the end accepted it after Alexander phrased his request as a direct order. (Note: Nadzieja notes that many expected Prince Adam Jerzy Czartoryski, considered to be Alexander's friend and one of the most notable Polish statesman in the Russian Empire, to receive this position. Czartoryski, however, was on ill terms with Alexander's relative Grand Duke Constantine Pavlovich, whom Alexander, due to Russian Empire's internal politics, decided to make his representative in Congress Poland. Grand Duke Constantine, in turn, favored Zajączek, and demanded from Alexander that he choose a military man as the new Namestnik.) Zajączek's years as a namestnik have garnered mixed reviews, both among his contemporaries, as well as among later historians. He was actively interested in economic development of Polish lands, and contributed to the industrialization and urbanization of the Kingdom's lands; he was also one of the founders of the University of Warsaw. He has been criticized, however, for being inexperienced for such a major civil leader position, too servile to the wishes of his patron, Grand Duke Constantine Pavlovich and he often disregarded the Constitution of the Congress Poland, which contributed to a slow but steady erosion of the country's freedoms and autonomy. Deferential towards the Russian authorities, he readily let Duke Constantine and Alexander's commissar, Nikolay Nikolayevich Novosiltsev, neither of whose positions were envisioned in the Constitution, become the de facto rulers of the Kingdom. In recognition of Zajączek's services, Aleksander I bestowed upon him the title of 'Prince of Poland' on 27 April 1818.

In the spring of 1826 Zajączek fell ill, steadily becoming weaker. On 25 July that year he lost consciousness, and died in the morning of 28 July at Pałac Namiestnikowski (Viceroy's Palace), nowadays a seat of the President of Poland. His funeral lasted from 2 to 5 August. He was buried at the Church of the Holy Heart of Jesus in Opatówek, where he had a manor on the lands received from Napoleon. His heart was placed in the Bernardine Church in Warsaw, and his insides were buried at the Powązki Cemetery, also in Warsaw.

Zajączek and his wife had no children; Aleksandra outlived her husband by nineteen years.

== Honours and awards ==
- Commander's Cross of the Virtuti Militari (1807)
- Order of the White Eagle (1815)
- Order of St. Andrew (1816)
- Order of the Black Eagle (Prussia, 1819)
- Knight's (1803) and Commander's Cross of the Legion of Honour (France, 1804)

== Sources ==
- Jadwiga Nadzieja (1988). Od Jakobina do księcia namiestnika [From Jacobin to namestnik]. Wydawnictwo "Śląsk". ISBN 978-83-216-0682-8.
