= Dominik Mikołaj Radziwiłł =

Polish–Lithuanian noble (1643–1697)

Dominik Mikołaj Radziwiłł Grand Chancellor of Lithuania
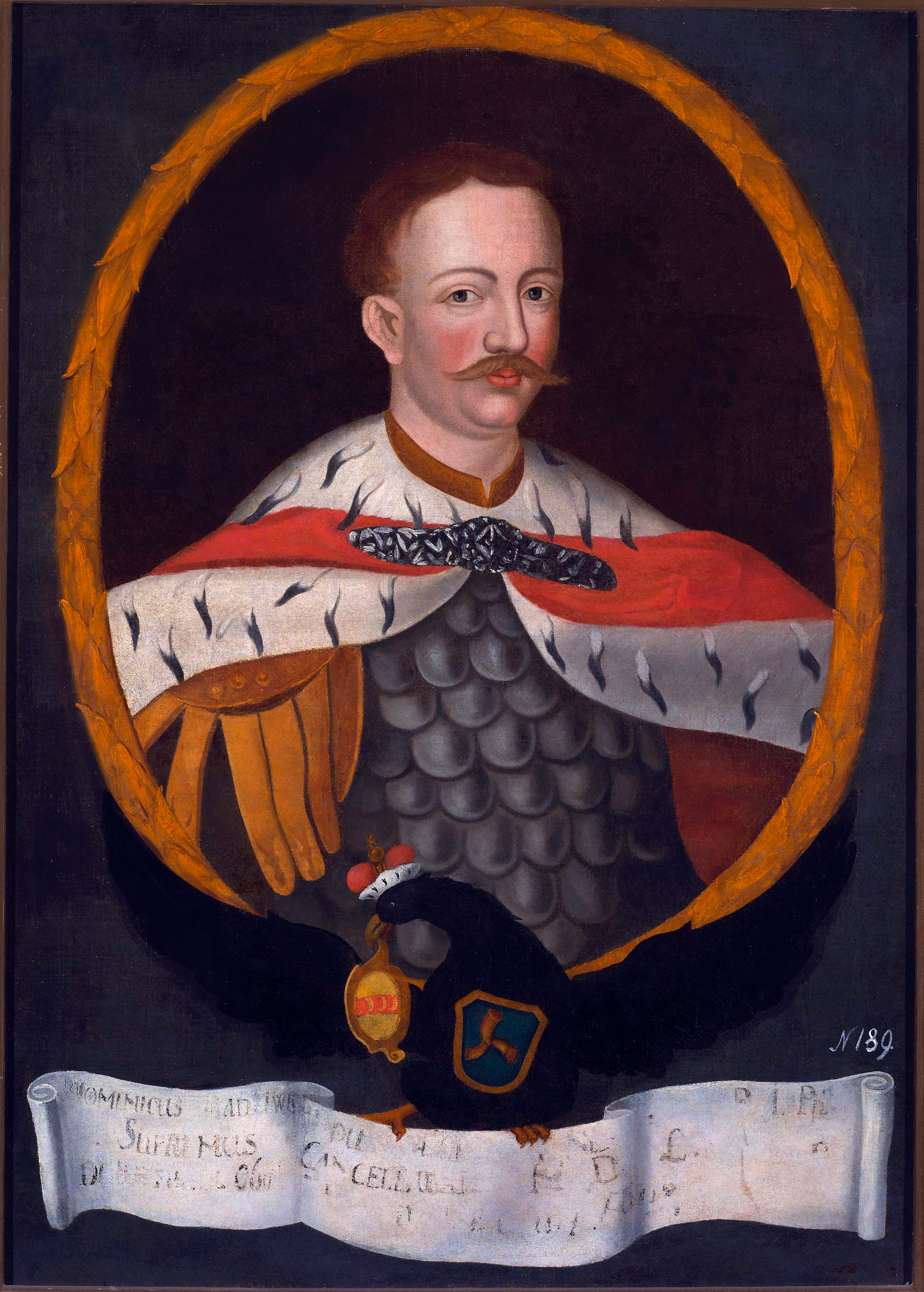
- Born: 1643; Nieswiez
- Died: 27 July 1697 (aged 53–54); Warsaw
- Spouses: Anna Marianna Połubienska; Anna Krystyna Lubomirska
- Children: with Anna Marianna Połubienska: Lukrecja Katarzyna Radziwiłł; Adelaida Cecylia Teresa Radziwiłł; Jan Mikołaj Radziwiłł; Zofia Radziwiłł; Feliks Radziwiłł; Michał Antoni Radziwiłł; Mikołaj Faustyn Radziwiłł; Marianna Radziwiłł
- Parent(s): Aleksander Ludwik Radziwiłł; Lucrezia Maria Strozzi

Prince Dominik Mikołaj Radziwiłł (Lithuanian: Dominykas Mikalojus Radvila; 1643–1697) was a Polish–Lithuanian nobleman (szlachcic) and politician.

He was son of Court and Grand Marshal Aleksander Ludwik Radziwiłł and Princess Lucrezia Maria Strozzi.

On 11 October 1672, he married Anna Marianna Połubińska, daughter of Aleksander Hilary Połubiński, Grand Marshal of Lithuania, and Zofia Konstancja Wołodkowicz, daughter of Krzysztof Wołodkowicz, voivode of Nowogródek.

In 1692, he married Anna Krystyna Lubomirska, daughter of Jerzy Sebastian Lubomirski.

He was ordynat of Kleck, Deputy Chancellor of Lithuania since 1681, and Grand Chancellor of Lithuania since 1690. He was also starost of Lida, Radom, Pińsk, Tuchola and Gniew.

Through his son Jan, he was the great-grandfather of Michał Hieronim Radziwiłł.
