= Piotr Fergusson Tepper =

Polish banker of German burgher origin, merchant and industrial entrepreneur

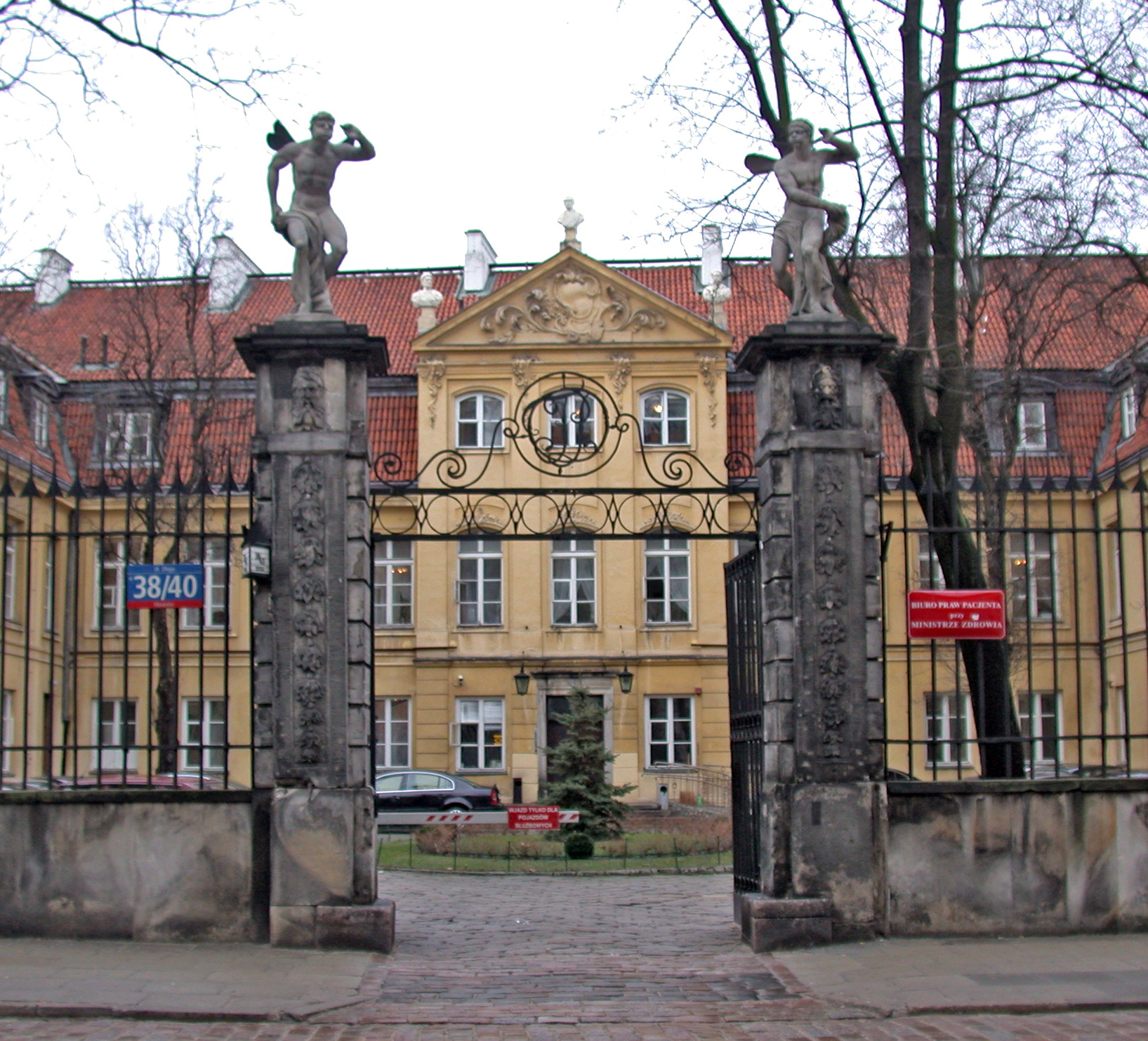
Piotr Tepper's palace at Długa Street in Warsaw

Piotr Fergusson Tepper (1713–1794) was a Polish banker, merchant and industrial entrepreneur of Scottish and German origin.

== Biography ==
Piotr Fergusson Tepper of Warsaw was the wealthiest banker in the second half of 18th century Poland. The Tepper bank had partners in Holland, Italy, and Russia and undertook large-scale international financial operations. Tepper was also the owner of a trading house and of landed estates in Mazovia and Volhynia. The principal lender of King Stanisław August Poniatowski and of the Treasury of the Polish–Lithuanian Commonwealth, in 1793 Tepper became bankrupt, along with several other Polish banks. Piotr Fergusson Tepper was fatally wounded during disturbances at the time of the Kościuszko Insurrection, after his trading and banking house at Miodowa Street was plundered. He is buried at Powązki Evangelical Cemetery in Warsaw.

== Family ==
Piotr Fergusson Tepper was the son of Scottish trader William Ferguson and his wife Katherina-Concordia Tepper, a sister of the wealthy and influential Prussian-Polish merchant, banker, furrier and fur trader Pjotr Tepper of Poznań (Pjotr Tepper managed the large-scale international trade using elite burgher family connections, and imported goods to Poland from many countries, including Britain).

In 1763, he married Maria-Filipina Valentin d'Hauterive (c. 1736–1792), daughter of a French emigrant who left Languedoc, in southern France, after the revocation of the Edict of Nantes in 1685. They had ten children, including Polish-Russian composer Ludwig-Wilhelm Tepper de Ferguson.
