= Andriy Bachynskyi =

- Bishop of Mukachevo
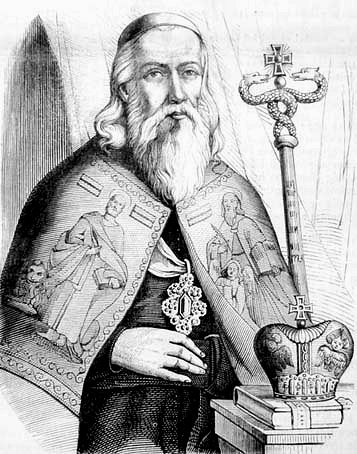
- Native name: Андрій Бачинський
- Church: Ruthenian Greek Catholic Church
- Diocese: Eparchy of Mukachevo
- In office: 8 March 1773 – 19 November 1809
- Predecessor: Ivan Bradach
- Successor: Oleksiy Povchiy

Orders
- Ordination: 2 September 1756 by Manuil Olshavskyi
- Consecration: 6 June 1773 by Vasilije Božičković

Personal details
- Born: 11 November 1732 Beňatina, Kingdom of Hungary, Habsburg Realm
- Died: 19 November 1809 (aged 77) Ungvár, Kingdom of Hungary, Austrian Empire

Andriy Bachynskyi (Ukrainian: Андрій Бачинський, Hungarian: Bacsinszky András; 11 November 1732 – 19 November 1809) was a Ruthenian Greek Catholic hierarch. He was bishop of the Ruthenian Catholic Eparchy of Mukacheve from 1773 to 1809.

== Biography ==
Born in Beňatina, Habsburg monarchy (present day – Slovakia) in 1732 in the family of the Ruthenian priest Teodor Bachynskyi. He was ordained a priest on 2 September 1756 for the Vicariate Apostolic for Ruthenians by Bishop Manuil Olshavskyi. He was confirmed as the Bishop by the Holy See on 8 March 1773. He was consecrated to the Episcopate on 6 June 1773. The principal consecrator was Bishop Vasilije Božičković and co-consecrators were Bishop Meletie Covaci and Bishop Franz Josef von Gondola. During his episcopacy, in 1777, the bishop's see was transferred from Mukacheve to Uzhgorod.

He died in Uzhgorod on 19 November 1809.

Catholic Church titles
Preceded by Ivan Bradach	Ruthenian Catholic Bishop of Mukacheve; 1773–1809	Succeeded by Mykhaylo Bradach (as Ap. Administrator)
