= Olszewski =

Olszewski (feminine Olszewska, plural Olszewscy, alternative Olszowski) is a Polish surname. The Russian-language version is Olshevsky, feminine: Olshevskaya. The Lithuanian language forms are Olšauskas and Alšauskas, feminine: Olšauskienė/Alšauskienė (married), and Olšauskaitė/Alšauskaitė (unmarried). Belarusian form: Альшэўскі (Alsheuski or Alshewski). Most probably it is a toponymic surname derived from any of the places named Olszewo, Olszew, Olszno, Olszow, Olszowa. It belongs to several noble Polish families. All of them are derived from olcha or olsza, alder tree. The Polish personal registry PESEL recorded 23,677 persons with the surname Olszewski and 23,896 persons with the surname Olszewska in 2023.

Notable people with the surname include:

- Agata Mróz-Olszewska (1982–2008), Polish volleyball player
- Albert Olszewski (born 1962), American politician
- Alfons Olszewski (1916–2006), Polish sailor
- Bobby Olszewski (born 1977), American politician
- Dariusz Olszewski (born 1967), Polish politician
- Eleanor Olszewski (born 1954/55), Canadian politician
- Eileen Olszewski (born 1968), American boxer
- Gunner Olszewski (born 1996), American football player
- Jan Olszewski (1930–2019), Polish lawyer and politician
- Johnny Olszewski (born 1982), American politician
- Johnny Olszewski (American football) (1929–1996), American football player
- Karol Olszewski (1846–1915), Polish chemist, mathematician and physicist
- Krzysztof Olszewski (born 1970), Polish photographer and artist
- Maria Olszewska (1892–1969), German opera singer
- Maria Olszewska-Lelonkiewicz (1939–2007), Polish figure skating coach
- Michał Olszewski (chess player) (born 1989), Polish chess grandmaster
- Michał Olszewski (priest) (1712–1779), Lithuanian Catholic priest and author
- Milena Olszewska (born 1984), Polish Paralympic archer
- Paweł Olszewski (politician) (born 1979), Polish economist and politician
- Paweł Olszewski (footballer), Polish football player
- Piotr Olszewski (born 1973), Polish rower
- Remigiusz Olszewski (born 1992), Polish sprinter
- Richard Olszewski (born 1961), British politician
- Sławomir Olszewski (born 1973), Polish football player
- Stanisław Olszewski (1852–1898), Polish engineer and inventor
- Włodzimierz Olszewski (born 1956), Polish ice hockey player

== See also ==
- Olszewski tube
- Progressive supranuclear palsy, aka Steele-Richardson-Olszewski syndrome
- Olszeski Town, Ohio
- Olšavský, Similar Slovak surname, of different origin
- Olshansky
