= Bradach =

Bradach may refer to:

- Nant Bradach, a valley in Wales
- Llanbradach, a village in Wales

== People ==
- Ivan Bradach (1732–1772)
- Mykhaylo Bradach (1748–1815)
