= Olšavský =

Olšavský (feminine: Olšavská) is a Slovak-language toponymic surname derived from the place of Oľšavica. Its Hungarian rendering is Olsavszky, Ukrainian / Rusyn: Olshavskyi. Notable people with the surname include:

- Éva Olsavszky
- Jerry Olsavsky
- Manuil Olshavskyi
- Stefan Olshavskyi
