= Oleksiy Povchiy =

Greek Catholic hierarch (1754–1831)

- Bishop of Mukachevo
- Native name: Pócsi Elek
- Church: Ruthenian Greek Catholic Church
- Diocese: Eparchy of Mukachevo
- In office: 28 July 1817 – 11 July 1831
- Predecessor: Andriy Bachynskyi
- Successor: Vasyl Popovych

Orders
- Ordination: 1789
- Consecration: 18 November 1817 by Samuil Vulcan

Personal details
- Born: 17 March 1754 Kokad, Kingdom of Hungary, Habsburg Realm
- Died: 11 July 1831 (aged 77) Ungvár, Kingdom of Hungary, Austrian Empire

Oleksiy Povchiy (Ukrainian: Олексій Повчій, Hungarian: Pócsi Elek; 17 March 1754 – 11 July 1831) was a Ruthenian Greek Catholic hierarch. He was bishop of the Ruthenian Catholic Eparchy of Mukacheve from 1817 to 1831.

Born in Kokad, Kingdom of Hungary (present day Hungary) in 1754, he was ordained a priest in 1789. He was confirmed as the Bishop by the Holy See on 28 July 1817. He was consecrated to the Episcopate on 6 November 1817, with the principal consecrator being Bishop Samuil Vulcan.

He died in Uzhhorod on 11 July 1831.

Catholic Church titles
Preceded by Mykhaylo Bradach (as Ap. Administrator)	Ruthenian Catholic Bishop of Mukacheve; 1817–1831	Succeeded by Vasyl Popovych
