= Kamienka, Stará Ľubovňa District =

Kamienka
- Municipality
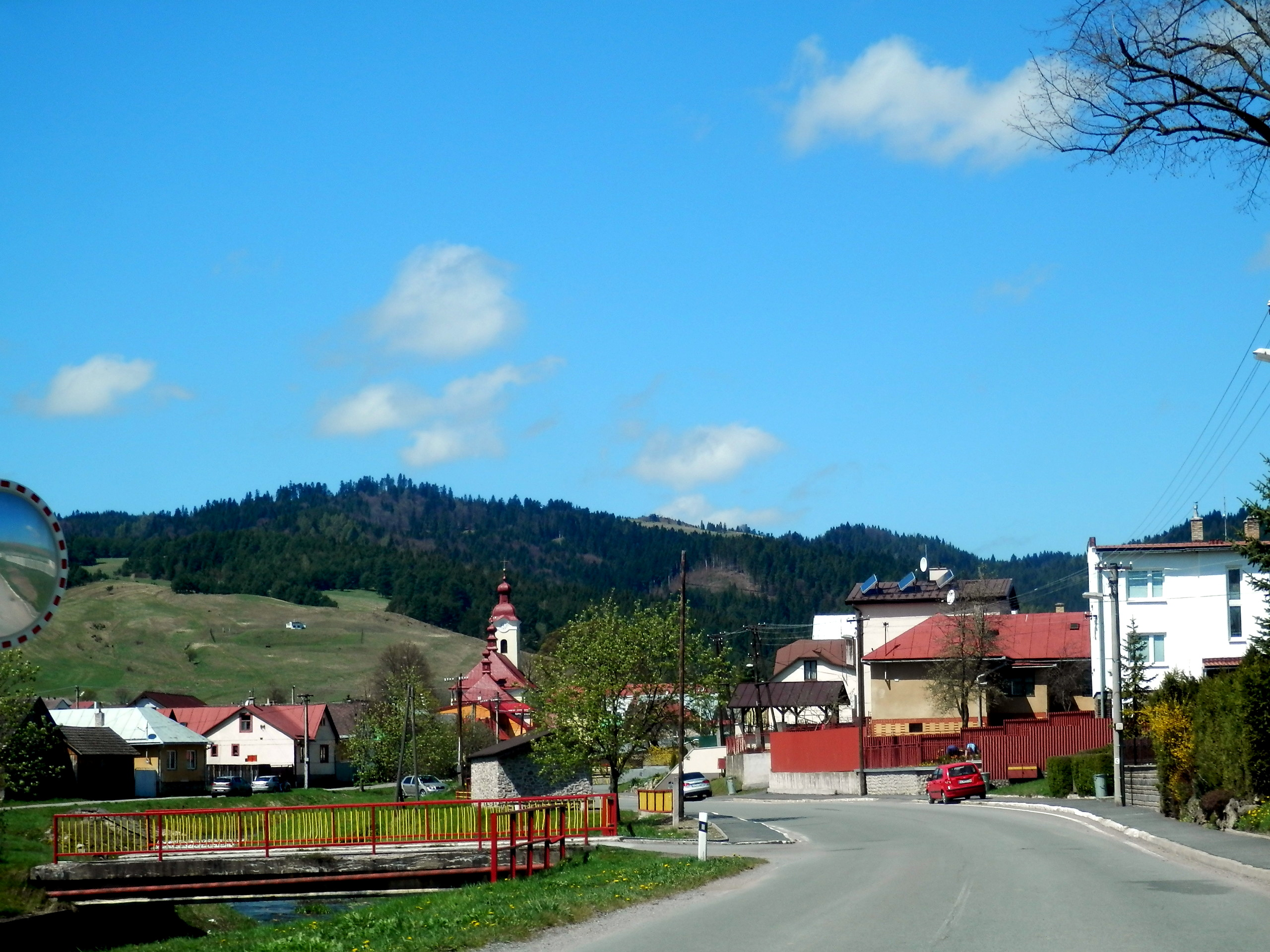

- Flag

- Location of Kamienka in the Prešov Region Location of Kamienka in Slovakia
- Coordinates: 49.33°N 20.61°E
- Country: Slovakia
- Region: Prešov Region
- District: Stará Ľubovňa District
- First mentioned: 1342

Area
  - Total: 29.17 km^{2} (11.26 sq mi)
- Elevation: 586 m (1,923 ft)

Population (2025)
  - Total: 1,335
- Time zone: UTC+1 (CET)
  - Summer (DST): UTC+2 (CEST)
- Postal code: 653 2
- Area code: +421 52
- Vehicle registration plate (until 2022): SL
- Website: www.obeckamienka.sk

Kamienka (Rusyn: Камюнка, romanized: Kamiunka; Ukrainian: Камйонка, romanized: Kamionka; Hungarian: Kövesfalva, German: Stein) is a village and municipality in Stará Ľubovňa District in the Prešov Region of northern Slovakia. The village is traditionally inhabited by Rusyns, as one of their westernmost settlements.

== History ==
In historical records the village was first mentioned in 1342. Before the establishment of independent Czechoslovakia in 1918, Kamienka was part of Szepes County within the Kingdom of Hungary. From 1939 to 1945, it was part of the Slovak Republic. On 25 January 1945, the Red Army dislodged the Wehrmacht from Kamienka and it was once again part of Czechoslovakia.

== Geography ==
The municipality lies at an altitude of 586 metres (1,923 ft) and covers an area of 29.17 km^{2} (11.26 sq mi) (2025).

== Population ==
Population statistic (10 years)
Year	1995	2005	2015	2025
Count	1442	1400	1371	1335
Difference		−2.91%	−2.07%	−2.62%

Population statistic
Year	2024	2025
Count	1341	1335
Difference		−0.44%

It has a population of 1335 people (31 December 2025).

=== Ethnicity ===
Census 2021 (1+ %)
Ethnicity	Number	Fraction
Slovak	913	68.33%
Rusyn	769	57.55%
Not found out	44	3.29%
Romani	29	2.17%
Total	1336	

In year 2021 was 1336 people by ethnicity 913 as Slovak, 769 as Rusyn, 44 as Not found out, 29 as Romani, 9 as Ukrainian, 7 as Other, 3 as Czech, 3 as English, 2 as Polish and 1 as German.

Note on population: The difference values of population numbers in the table "Population statistic" and in the sections "Ethnicity" & "Religion" is caused by the use of various statistical methods.

=== Religion ===
Census 2021 (1+ %)
Religion	Number	Fraction
Greek Catholic Church	1123	84.06%
Roman Catholic Church	101	7.56%
None	51	3.82%
Other and not ascertained christian church	19	1.42%
Not found out	17	1.27%
Total	1336	

In year 2021 was 1336 people by religion 1123 from Greek Catholic Church, 101 from Roman Catholic Church, 51 from None, 19 from Other and not ascertained christian church, 17 from Not found out, 9 from Jehovah's Witnesses, 7 from Eastern Orthodox Church, 6 from Other, 1 from Christian Congregations in Slovakia, 1 from Evangelical Church and 1 from Ad hoc movements.

== Genealogical resources ==
The records for genealogical research are available at the state archive "Statny Archiv in Levoca, Slovakia"

- Roman Catholic church records (births/marriages/deaths): 1624-1945 (parish B)
- Greek Catholic church records (births/marriages/deaths): 1787-1924 (parish A)

Here were born two Greek-Catholic bishops, Ivan Bradach (1732–1772) and his younger brother Mykhaylo Bradach (1748–1815)

== See also ==
- List of municipalities and towns in Slovakia
