= Synod of Zamość =

Historical Ruthenian Uniate Synod

The Synod of Zamość was a Ruthenian Uniate synod held in 1720 in Zamość. It is considered a crucial event that stabilised the Uniate liturgy and organisation after this Church had managed to gain the upper hand among the Eastern Christians of the Polish-Lithuanian Commonwealth. Having brought the Uniates into line with the Tridentine Catholicism, the synod remains a controversial issue, as its critics claim that it corrupted the Ruthenian Uniate traditions with too many borrowings from the Latins.

== Background ==
In 1596 the Ruthenian Orthodox bishops of the Polish-Lithuanian Commonwealth accepted the terms of the 1439 Union of Florence and concluded the Union of Brest with the Holy See in Rome. In exchange for the promises of political elevation within the Commonwealth and the preservation of their Byzantine-Slavonic liturgy and organisation, they chose to recognise the papal supremacy. Many Orthodox Ruthenians, however, regarded that agreement as contemptible and rejected it outright, which led to a prolonged internecine strife among the Commonwealth's Eastern Christians and constituted one of the causes of the Cossack uprisings.

In the course of the seventeenth century, the Polish-Lithuanian Commonwealth lost control of Kyiv and the territories on the left bank of the Dnipro, inhabited by the Ukrainian Cossacks and nobles fiercely opposed to the Union of Brest. This, in turn, weakened the supporters of Orthodoxy among those Ruthenians who remained under the Polish-Lithuanian rule and enabled the Uniates to gain the upper hand: the process was crowned in 1700 when the bishop Iosyf Shumlianskyi succeeded in turning the crucial eparchy of Lviv to Union.

In the second decade of the eighteenth century the Uniate Metropolitan Lev Kyshka applied to Rome for permission to convene a provincial synod that would order the affairs of his Church and solidify its dominance among the Commonwealth's Ruthenians. Pope Clement XI agreed.

== Sessions and attendance ==
Originally, the synod was to take place in Lviv, but it was removed to Zamość due to the epidemic. Three sessions were held in the St Nicholas Church in the southeast part of the town: the first one on 26 August 1720, the second one on 1 September, and the last one on 17 September. The meetings were presided by the papal nuncio to Poland-Lithuania Archbishop of Edessa Girolamo Grimaldi. Apart from the metropolitan Kyshka, the synod was attended by the following Uniate bishops:

- Teodosii Godebskyi, bishop of Pinsk,
- Floriian Hrebnytskyi, archbishop of Polatsk,
- Iosyf Levytskyi, bishop of Chełm,
- Lavrentii Sokolnytskyi-Drutskyi, bishop of Smolensk,
- Ieronim Ustrytskyi, bishop of Przemyśl,
- Iosyf Vyhovskyi, bishop of Lutsk.

The gathering was also joined by the leaders of the Uniate Basilian Order and lay representatives of the Lviv Dormition Brotherhood.

== Statutes ==
The regulations adopted in Zamość brought the Uniate Church into line with the Tridentine policies and sensibilities, but at the same time aimed to preserve its separate character, for example Uniate priests were strictly forbidden to use the unleavened Latin-style bread for the Eucharist. The synod decreed the insertion of the filioque and mentions of the current pope in public prayers, as well as stricter care of the matter of the Eucharist. They also ordered the withdrawal of existing liturgical books to be replaced with new editions approved by Vatican censors. The uniquely Latin Catholic holiday of Corpus Christi was now introduced into the Uniate liturgical calendar, whereas the veneration of Gregory Palamas was expressly prohibited. Zamość tacitly recognised the presence of side altars and the performance of more than one liturgy a day in Uniate churches. The synod demanded also the establishment of diocesan seminaries and the unification of the Basilian monasteries of the Polish-Lithuanian Commonwealth into one congregation. What is more, in the future only Basilian monks were to be nominated as bishops.

== Aftermath ==
Pope Benedict XIII approved the synod's statutes and had them published in Latin in 1724. Metropolitan Kyshka had released a concise Ruthenian-language catechism based on the Zamość regulations already in 1722 and in 1743 the next Metropolitan, Atanasii Sheptytskyi, had the statutes published in that language for the first time, but this translation soon became a rarity. Much more accessible was the Polish-language edition of 1785. The Propaganda Fide republished the Latin version twice in the course of the nineteenth century and eventually in 1897 a Ukrainian translation was produced in Lviv by the authorities of the Ukrainian Greek Catholic Church.

Both before and after the synod of Zamość the Uniate Church adopted many practices of the Latin Catholic Church. Numerous Orthodox and some Greek Catholic critics condemned this phenomenon as an unnecessary, if not outright harmful, Latinization of the Eastern Christian tradition. In the nineteenth century the Zamość regulations formed the basis of the Greek Catholic liturgical and organisational practices in Austrian Galicia, but critical voices continued to challenge them.

In the twentieth century Metropolitan Andrei Sheptytskyi oversaw reforms aimed at restoring more Byzantine form of worship, moving away from many post-Zamość usages. Under this reform, however, some older pre-Nikonian practices, previously preserved among Greek Catholics, were abandoned on the grounds that they were themselves perceived as Latinizing elements.
