= Mykhaylo Bradach =

Ukrainian catholic bishop

Mykhaylo Bradach (Ukrainian: Михайло Брадач; 2 April 1748 – 20 December 1815) was a Ruthenian Greek Catholic hierarch. He was titular bishop of Dorylaeum, auxiliary bishop (from 1808) and Apostolic Administrator of the Ruthenian Catholic Eparchy of Mukacheve from 1812 to 1815.

== Life ==
Born in Kamienka, Kingdom of Hungary (present day – Slovakia) in 1748, he was ordained a priest on 15 August 1777. He was a younger brother of Bishop Ivan Bradach and nephew of Bishops Stefan Olshavskyi and Manuil Olshavskyi. He was appointed as the Auxiliary Bishop by the Holy See on 30 September 1808. He was consecrated to the Episcopate on 8 January 1809. The principal consecrator was Bishop Samuil Vulcan. In 1812 Bishop Bradach was appointed as Apostolic Administrator of the Eparchy of Mukacheve, that was vacant from 1809.

He died in Uzhhorod on 20 December 1815.

Catholic Church titles
| Preceded by Andriy Bachynskyi | Ruthenian Catholic Bishop of Mukacheve; 1812–1815 (as Ap. Administrator) | Succeeded by Oleksiy Povchiy |
