= Havryil Blazhovskyi =

Havryil Heorhiy Blazhovskyi
- Eparch of Mukacheve
- Church: Ruthenian Greek Catholic Church
- Diocese: Vicar Apostolic for the Ruthenians in Mukacheve
- Appointed: 14 January 1738
- Term ended: 20 December 1742
- Predecessor: Stefan Olshavskyi
- Successor: Manuil Olshavskyi

Orders
- Ordination: 1729 (Priest) by Hennadiy Bizantsiy
- Consecration: 27 December 1738 (Bishop) by Atanasiy Sheptytskyi

Personal details
- Born: Juraj Mankovič about 1705 Blažov
- Died: 20 December 1742 (aged 36–37) Mukachevo

Havryil Heorhiy Blazhovskyi, O.S.B.M. (born as Juraj Mankovič; Ukrainian: Гавриїл Георгій Блажовський, Hungarian: Gábor György Blazsovszky, Slovak: Gabriel Juraj Blažovsky, c. 1705 – 20 December 1742) was the bishop of the Vicariate Apostolic for the Ruthenians in Mukacheve from 1738 to his death in 1742.

== Life ==
Heorhiy Blazhovskyi was born on about 1705 in the village of Blažov, from which he took his surname (which originally was Mankovič). He studied philosophy in Košice and then in the Jesuit college of Trnava. At the end of his studies, he was ordained secular priest in 1729 by Bishop Hennadiy Bizantsiy and assigned to the Vicariate Apostolic of Mukacheve.

At the death of his predecessor, he was appointed, on 14 January 1738 as general vicar by the Latin bishop of Eger. He received the titular see of Agnus on 12 September 1738 and was consecrated bishop on 27 December 1738 by the Metropolitan of Kiev and all Rus', Atanasiy Sheptytskyi in Lviv. A few time before consecration, Heorhiy Blazhovskyi entered in the Order of Saint Basil the Great and took the religious name of Havryil.

Bishop Havryil Blazhovskyi died in Mukachevo on 20 December 1742.

== Notes ==
Catholic Church titles
Preceded by Stefan Olshavskyi	Vicar Apostolic for the Ruthenians in Mukacheve; 1738–1742	Succeeded by Manuil Olshavskyi
