= Evangelical Church, Levoča =

Coordinates: 49°1′31″N 20°35′18″E

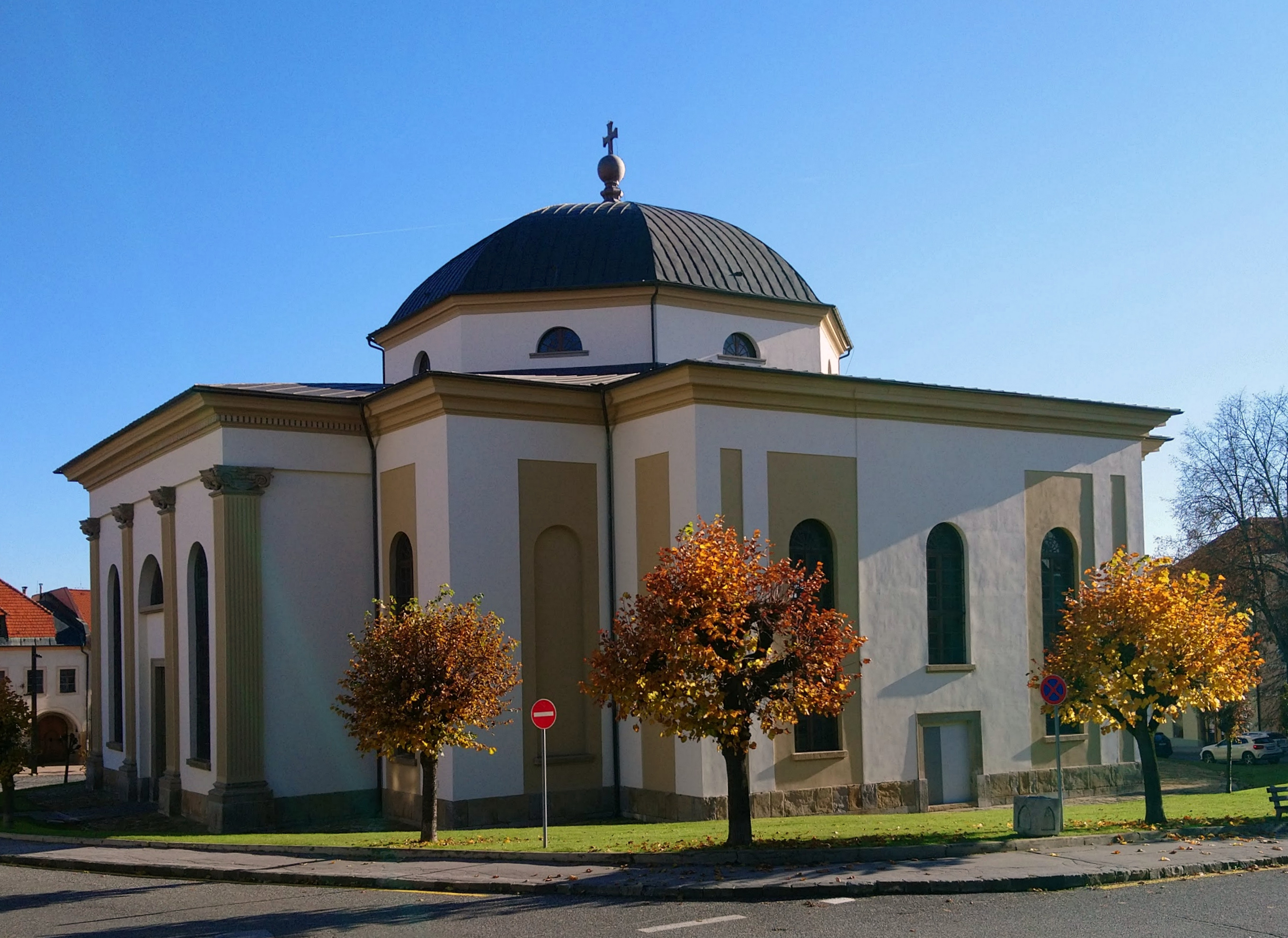
- Evangelical Church, Levoča
- Location: Levoča, Slovakia

History
- Founded: 1688

The Evangelical Church of the Augsburg Confession in Levoča, (Slovak: Evanjelický kostol v Levoči), Slovakia, is a Lutheran church which dates from 1823 and replaced two earlier, wooden, churches.

== The church ==
The first Lutheran church in the town was a wooden articular church, built outside the city walls in 1688. This church burned down in 1709, and a second wooden church was built in 1713. These churches were on the site of the present Evangelical cemetery of the town.

Following the Edict of Tolerance issued by Emperor Joseph II in 1781, it was permitted to construct evangelical churches within city boundaries. From 1823, finance was raised, including from the sale of bibles printed in the town, and the church was consecrated in 1832. It is situated at the southern end of the town's main square, today named Majster Pavol Square.

The church's architect was Anton Povolný, who also designed the town's County Hall (Župný dom) (constructed 1802–1822), both in a Neoclassical style. The format of the church is a Greek cross, surmounted by a dome. There are two pipe organs, a Baroque organ from the first church and a larger modern instrument. The large painting above the altar, of Christ walking on the water, was painted by Jozef Czauczic. THe church maintains an extensive historic library.

== Other buildings in Levoča associated with the church ==
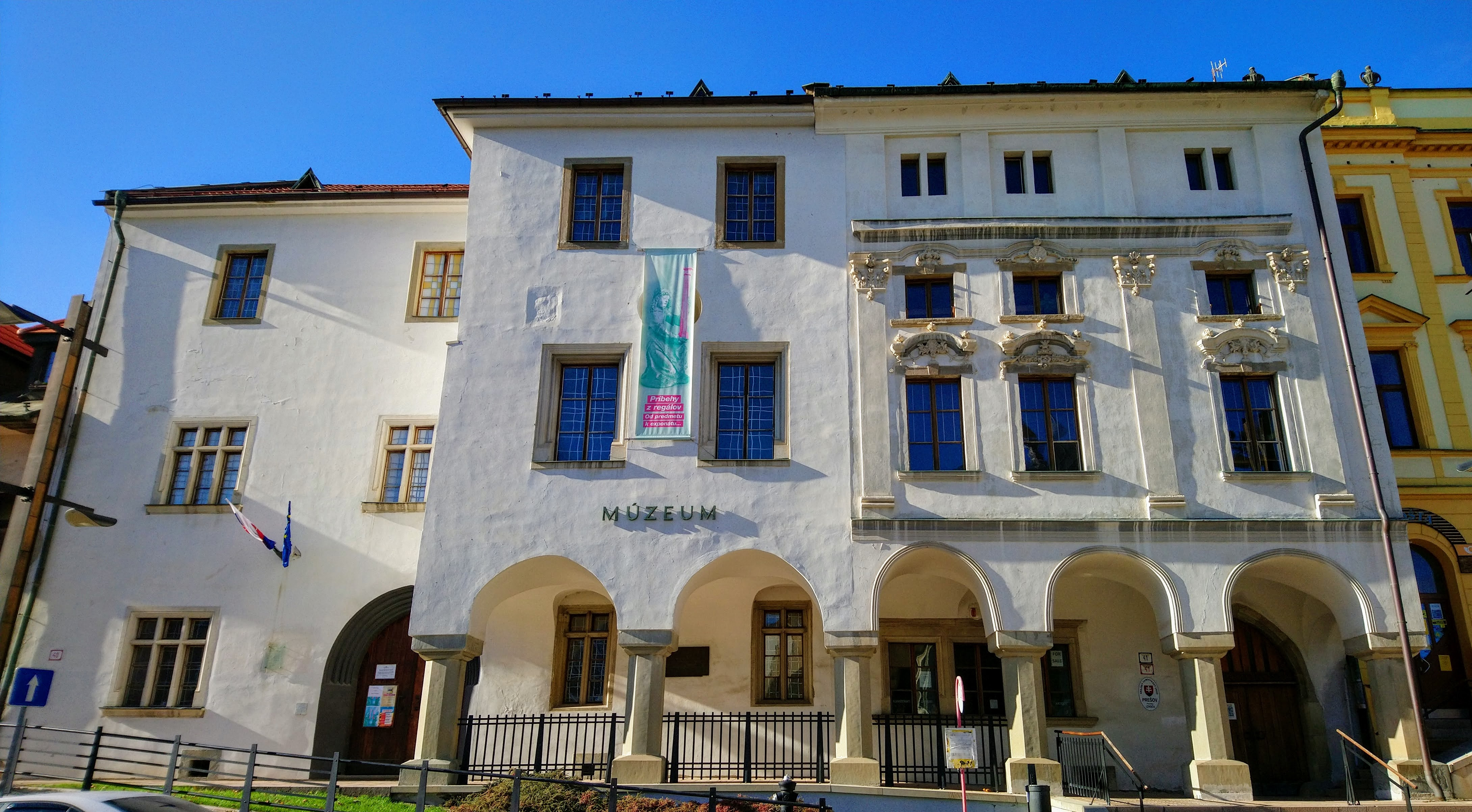
Spiš Museum, Levoča

A number of other buildings in Levoča are associated with the church and the Lutheran community of the town.

The Seminary, also in Majster Pavol Square, was originally known as Hain's House, and was given to the Lutheran community in 1796. It became a stronghold of Slovak nationalism in the 1840s under supporters of Ľudovít Štúr. The building today houses the exhibition halls of the Spiš Museum in Levoča, the local branch of the Slovak National Museum.

The Parsonage at ul. Vysoky 1 was given to the church in 1801 and extensively remodeled a century later. It contains pews and other items from the former Evangelical Church at Dvorce, a nearby village which was destroyed in the 1950s to make way for the Javorina military training area.

The Hospital and Orphanage outside the city's eastern walls now form part of the town hospital. Just south of the orphanage building, the Evangelical Cemetery preserves its 1722 gateway and contains a rectangular single-nave church built in 1895.
