= Michal Kravčík =

Slovak hydrologist and environmentalist

- Born: 3 February 1956 (age 70)
- Occupations: environmentalist, engineer
- Organization(s): People and water
- Known for: preserving the village of Tichý Potok
- Notable work: New Water Paradigm – Water for the Recovery of Climate
- Title: Dipl Ing. PhD. Pdfl. Uchl.
- Awards: Goldman Environmental Prize (1999)
- Website: http://kravcik.blog.sme.sk/

Michal Kravčík (Slovak pronunciation: [ˈmixal ˈkrawtʂiːk]; born 3 February 1956) is a Slovak hydrologist and environmentalist. He was awarded the Goldman Environmental Prize in 1999, for his contributions to the management of the Torysa River.

== Career ==
He graduated at the Civil Engineering Faculty of Slovak University of Technology in Bratislava. He received a Dipl Ing. PhD.. He worked for 8 years at the Slovak Academy of Sciences. He promotes ecological solutions for integrated river basin management. Kravčík published numerous works, including "New Water Paradigm – Water for the Recovery of Climate" in 2007. He is a founding member and Chairman of non-government organization People and Water (Slovak: MVO Ľudia a voda). He is a member of Ashoka.

== Proposals ==
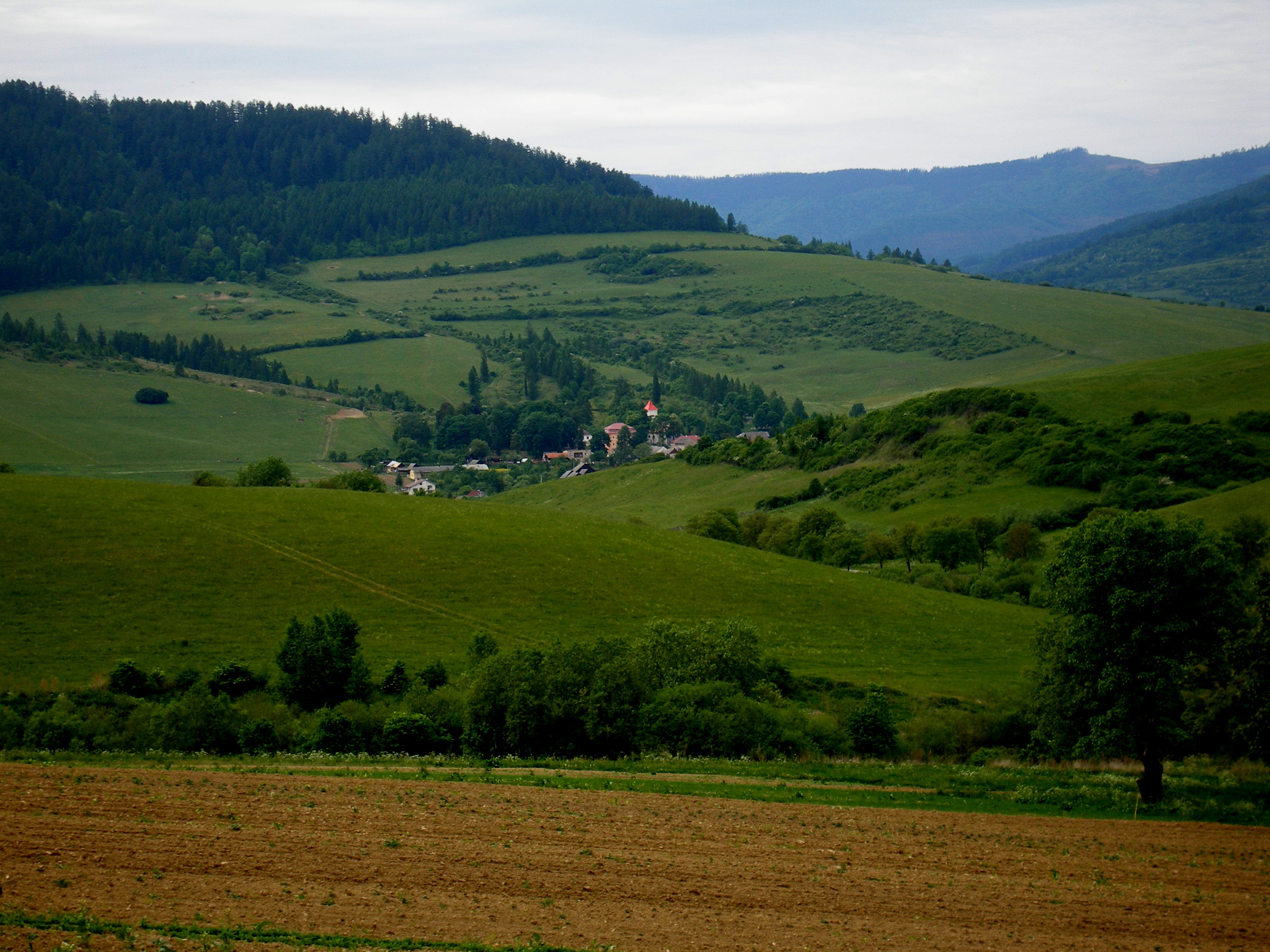
Tichy Potok

In 1992 the democratic Slovakian government restored an idea from the communist era to build a dam in Tichý Potok on the Torysa river. The project was supposed to provide drinking water for cities in eastern Slovakia and address potential water shortages. The investment would affect the environment and would require the abandonment of four 700-year-old villages. Kravčík objected, claiming that existing drinking water reservoirs had not been used to their full extent, water consumption rate had been decreasing and huge quantities of water were wasted at the stage of distribution. In 1993 he suggested a solution to the problem named "Water for Third Millennium".

In 1994 he proposed "The Blue Alternative". One of the requirements was the decentralisation of power, because water was planned to be distributed by local authorities. Kravčík's plan began by building 35 microbasins, weirs and dams on local streams. He also intended to protect historic villages and to support agriculture. The Slovakian Ministry of Environment rejected his idea.

Kravčík, together with the People and Water NGO, organised summer work camps in 1995 and 1996 in order to build small water reservoirs. Once the construction was finished, the media was invited to the site. The project became even more popular, when People and Water were fined for building without permission. He introduced the "Villages for the Third Millennium" program which included the development of 24 villages. They ran activities such as an organic farm, agrotourism, handicrafts, a fish farm and a reed bed water treatment plant. Kravčík initiated a campaign, "Village and democracy", that included 164 villages in the mountain region of Levoča. He introduced democratic processes and worked to create a sustainable, open society.

In 1998 he entered the national stage, when he organised an educational campaign on the topic of the forthcoming elections. As a result of his actions, the elections were attended by 84% of population and the former prime minister who supported the idea of building the dam in Tichy Potok was defeated.
