= Hennadiy Bizantsiy =

- Eparch of Mukacheve
- Church: Ruthenian Greek Catholic Church
- Diocese: Eparchy of Mukacheve
- Appointed: 3 April 1716
- Term ended: 22 July 1733
- Predecessor: Yosyp Hodermarskyi
- Successor: Stefan Olshavskyi

Orders
- Ordination: 1701
- Consecration: 21 Dec 1716 (Bishop) by Lev Kiszka

Personal details
- Born: 1657 Nagyrákóc, Kingdom of Hungary (now Velykyi Rakovets, Ukraine)
- Died: 22 July 1733 (aged 75–76) Csernek (Cernuc), near Gârbou

Hennadiy Yuriy Bizantsiy, O.S.B.M. (Hungarian: Bizánczy György, or George Gennadius Bizanczy, 1657, Nagyrákóc, Hungary – 1733, Csákigorbó, Hungary) was the bishop of the Eparchy of Munkács from 1716 to his death in 1733.

== Life ==
Yuriy Bizantsiy was born in 1657. He completed his studies in the Jesuit college of Nagyszombath and ordained as a priest in 1701. He was assigned as parish priest in Nagykálló, near the village of Máriapócs where an icon of the Virgin Mary wept in 1696 and again in August 1715.

The succession of the eparch of Munkács Joseph De Camillis, died in 1706, was problematic. Three pretenders were appointed: Yosyp Hodermarskyi appointed by the Habsburgs king Joseph I of Hungary, Petronius Kaminsky appointed by anti-Habsburgs Francis II Rákóczi, and Ukrainian Polycarp Fylypovych appointed in 1709 by Rome. The solution arrived only in 1715: Kaminsky died, Hodermarskyi retired in a monastery and on 4 May 1715 the clergy elected Hennadit Bizantsiy, as suggested by the Latin bishop of Eger. His election was confirmed by the King of Hungary and later, on 3 April 1716 also by Pope Clement XI, who retracted the appointment of Fylypovych.

At the time, the eparch (bishop) of Mukacheve was granted formally only the title of apostolic vicar in order not to have two bishops, one Latin and one Greek Catholic, on the same territory. However Bizantsiy had to pay the support of the Latin bishop of Eger in his election: the eparchy of Mukacheve became subject to Eger bishop, who soon hampered his action. Only in 1771 the eparchy was made independent from the Eger bishop.

Hennadiy Bizantsiy received the titular see of Sebastopolis in Armenia and was consecrated bishop on 21 December 1716 by the Metropolitans of Kiev, Lev Kiszka.

In 1729 he joined the Basilian Order of which he became Archimandrite. In 1731 he stated the erection of the sanctuary of Máriapócs. He worked with success in strengthening the communion with the Catholic Church, and he succeeded to have always remembered by all the priests the name of the Pope into the Divine Liturgies. Gennadius Bizanczy died on 22 July 1733 in a monastery in Csernek, near Gârbou (Hungarian: Csáki-Gorbó).

== Notes ==
Catholic Church titles
Preceded by Polikarp Fylypovych	Vicar Apostolic for the Ruthenians in Mukacheve; 1715–1733	Succeeded by Stefan Olshavskyi
