= Agnou =

Titular bishopric in Egypt

- Ἀγνοῦ (Ancient Greek) ⲡⲓϣⲓⲛⲏⲟⲩ (Coptic) اجنو (Arabic)
- Location within Egypt
- 31°32′2.75″N 30°49′22.03″E
- Type: City
- Periods: Ptolemaic Egypt, Roman Empire, Byzantine Empire, Umayyad Caliphate
- Location: Lower Egypt, Egypt
- Region: Bashmur

Agnou (Ancient Greek: Ἀγνοῦ, Coptic: ⲡⲓϣⲓⲛⲏⲟⲩ, Arabic: اجنو, romanized: Ignu) was an ancient city and bishopric in Egypt. It was located on the strip of land between the lake Burullus and the Mediterranean Sea, near the modern village al-Hanafi al-Kubra (Arabic: الحنفي الكبرى).

It remains a Latin Catholic titular see.

== History ==
Agnou was important enough in the late Roman province of Aegyptus Primus to be one of the many suffragan of the Metropolitan (becoming Patriarchate) of capital Alexandria, yet was to fade.

Al-Maqrizi describes Agnou as a fortified coastal city and says that during the Arab conquest of Egypt the ruler of the city named Talma (Arabic: طلما) had a dispute with Amr ibn al-As concerning the payment of jizya, which led to him rebelling and joining the Byzantine forces marching from Alexandria to Nikiou, after they recaptured the city in 646. They plundered and looted villages on their way, causing a major insurrection and shift of loyalty among the Egyptian population. The Byzantines were ultimately defeated and Talma himself was captured by the Arabs. The locals demanded his execution but Amr spared him, leading to Agnou pledging alliance to the Muslims.

George of Cyprus mentions Agnou as the third mouth of the Nile. The Muslim records about Agnou's location are contradictory. Some authors (Ibn Hawqal, al-Maqrizi) place it between al-Burullus and Rashid, which corresponds to older sources, while al-Yaqubi mistakenly places it between Rashid and Alexandria under the name Ikhnu (Arabic: اخنو). The names Iknhu and Ignu are interchangeable as seen in the name of the corresponding Medieval Egyptian kura.

== Titular see ==
The diocese was nominally restored in 1933 as a Latin Catholic titular bishopric.

It is vacant since decades, having had the following incumbents of the lowest (episcopal) rank :

- Havryil Blazhovskyi, O.S.B.M. (1738.09.12 – 1742.12.20)
- Richard Patrick Smith (1837.02.21 – 1845.05.28) (later Archbishop*)
- Thomas John Feeney, S.J. (1951.05.10 – 1955.09.09)
- Paul Nguyễn Văn Bình (1955.09.20 – 1960.11.24) (later Archbishop*)
- Michel-Louis Vial (1961.02.08 – 1963.12.17)

== Source and External links ==
- GCatholic with titular incumbent bio links
