= Dvorce (Slovakia) =

Slovak former village

Coordinates: 49°05′N 20°34′E

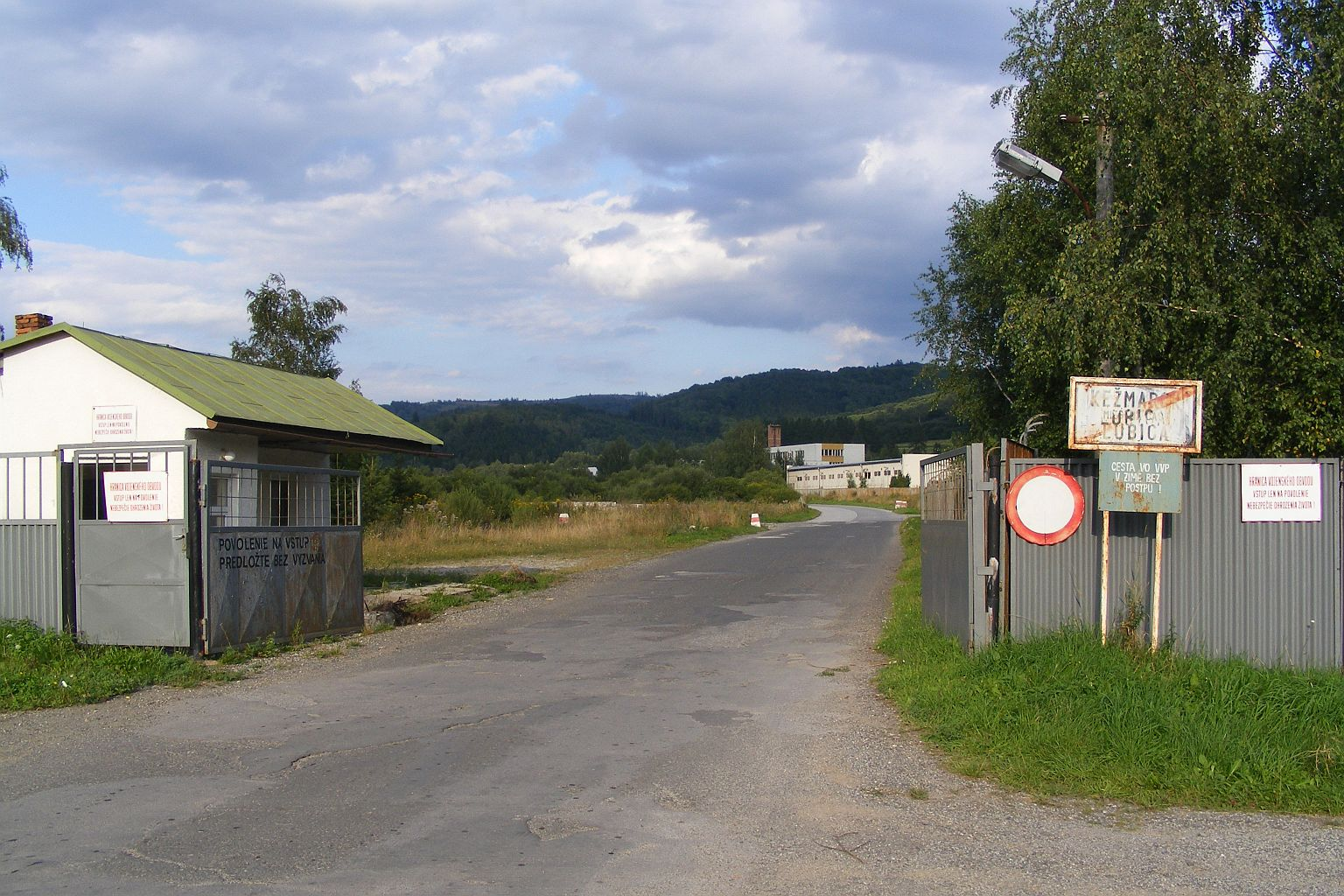

Dvorce (Hungarian: Szepesudvard) is a former village in the Levoča District in Slovakia.

Dvorce was part of the Szepes county of the Kingdom of Hungary and was part of the Levoča District. After over 600 years, the village was evacuated and destroyed in the 1950s to make way for the Javorina military training area. Some of the fittings of the Evangelical (Lutheran) church of Dvorce, which was also destroyed, are preserved in the parsonage of the Evangelical Church, Levoča.

Dvorce has been known by various names: in Hungarian as 'Dvorecz' (1869 place name), and 'Szepesudvard' (current usage) and in German as 'Burgerhof'.
