= Yurij Vynnyckyj =

Metropolitan of Kiev, Galicia and all Ruthenia (1710–1713)

- Metropolitan of Kiev
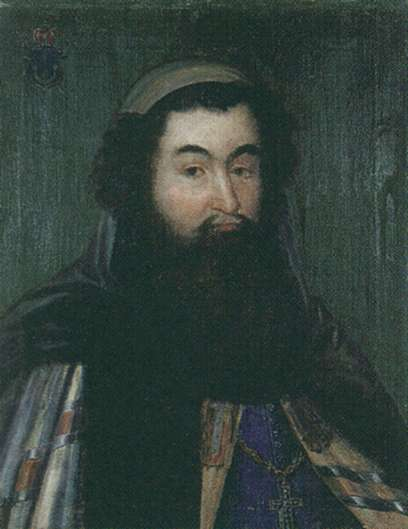
- Church: Ukrainian Greek Catholic Church
- Appointed: 7 May 1710
- Term ended: 22 September 1713
- Predecessor: Lev Zalenskyj
- Successor: Lev Kiszka

Orders
- Ordination: 1700 (Priest) by Gedeon Voyna Orański
- Consecration: 1700 (Bishop) by Lev Zalenskyj

Personal details
- Born: Gabriel Vynnyckyj; 1660
- Died: 22 September 1713 (aged 52–53) Straszewice (now Sambir Raion)

Gabriel Yurij Vynnyckyj (Ukrainian: Юрій Винницький, Belarusian: Юры Віньніцкі, Polish: Jerzy Winnicki) (1660—1713) was the Administrator of Kiev–Galicia from 1708 and the "Metropolitan of Kiev, Galicia and all Ruthenia" (Note: The title is also known as the Metropolis of Kiev, Halych and all Rus' or Metropolis of Kyiv, Halychyna, and All-Rus'. The name "Galicia" is a Latinized form of Halych, one of several regional principalities of the medieval state of Kievan Rus'.) of the Ukrainian Greek Catholic Church from 1710 to his death in 1713.

== Life ==
Gabriel Vynnyckyj was born in 1660 from an influential family of Przemyśl. His uncle Anthony Vynnyckyj on about 1650 was the Orthodox bishop of the town, which initially did not adhere to the Union of Brest thus having for a short period two bishops. In 1679 the older brother of Gabriel, Innokentiy Vynnyckyj became the Orthodox bishop of the town and on 23 June 1691 Inokentij publicly accepted the Union for himself and for his eparchy, and he remained the only bishop of the town after the Greek Catholic bishop Ivan Malaxovskyj on the same year moved to Chełm.

Bishop Innokentij Vynnyckyj died on 24 February 1700 and Gabriel Vynnyckyj was chosen for his succession as Eparch (Bishop) of the Eparchy of Przemyśl. Gabriel was still a layman, thus on 20 April 1700 he entered in the Order of Saint Basil the Great taking the religious name of Yurij (George), and shortly later was ordained as a priest. On 6 May 1700 he was formally appointed bishop by king Augustus II, and he was formally elected by the faithfuls and the clergy on 5 June 1700 and so confirmed by the Pope on 14 August 1700. He was ordained as Bishop in the same year by the Metropolitan of Kiev Lev Zalenskyj.

In 1707, after the death of bishop Joseph De Camillis, he was appointed administrator of the Eparchy of Mukacheve for which there were political problems for the succession. In 1708 he became also administrator of the eparchies of Lviv and Volodymyr. At the death of Metropolitan of Kiev, Lev Zalenskyj, he was also appointed administrator of Kiev (28 August 1708). He was shortly later elected Metropolitan of Kiev and Galicia, but because of the ongoing Great Northern War, he could be formally confirmed by the king only until 1710. Soon after, on 7 May 1710, he was confirmed by Pope Clement XI. As soon as he was formally confirmed as Metropolitan, he could appoint bishops for the other eparchies he was administrator.

Vynnyckyj was the leader of the Ukrainian Greek Catholic Church in a very difficult period, during the Great Northern War (1700-1721), and under the armed opposition of Peter I of Russia to the Greek Catholic Church, particularly in the eparchy of Lutzk. He anyway worked hard to implement the union of Brest, and under his reign the stauropegic confraternity of Lviv accepted the Union in 1709 and also the important Pochayiv Monastery adhered to it in 1712. In 1712 he endowed a large amount of money for the construction of a seminary in Przemyśl.

He died on 22 September 1713 in Straszewice (now Sambir Raion, Lviv Oblast, Ukraine).

== Notes ==
Ruthenian Uniate Church titles
Preceded by Innokentiy Vinnitski	Bishop of Przemysl and Sanok; 1700 – 1713	Succeeded by Lev Kishka (as administrator)
Preceded by Yosyf de Kamelis	Bishop of Mukachevo (as administrator); 1706 – 1707	Succeeded by Yosyf Hodermarski
Preceded by Yosyf Shumlyanski	Bishop of Lwow and Kamianets-Podolski (as administrator); 1708 – 1710	Succeeded by Varlaam Sheptytski
Preceded by Lev Zalenski	Bishop of Wlodziemierz and Bresc (as administrator); 1708 – 1711	Succeeded by Lev Kishka
Preceded by Lev Zalenski	Metropolitan of Kiev, Galicia and all Ruthenia; 1710 – 1713 (as administrator since 1708)	Succeeded by Lev Kishka
