= Lev Kiszka =

Metropolitan of Kiev, Galicia and all Ruthenia (1714–1728)

- Metropolitan of Kiev
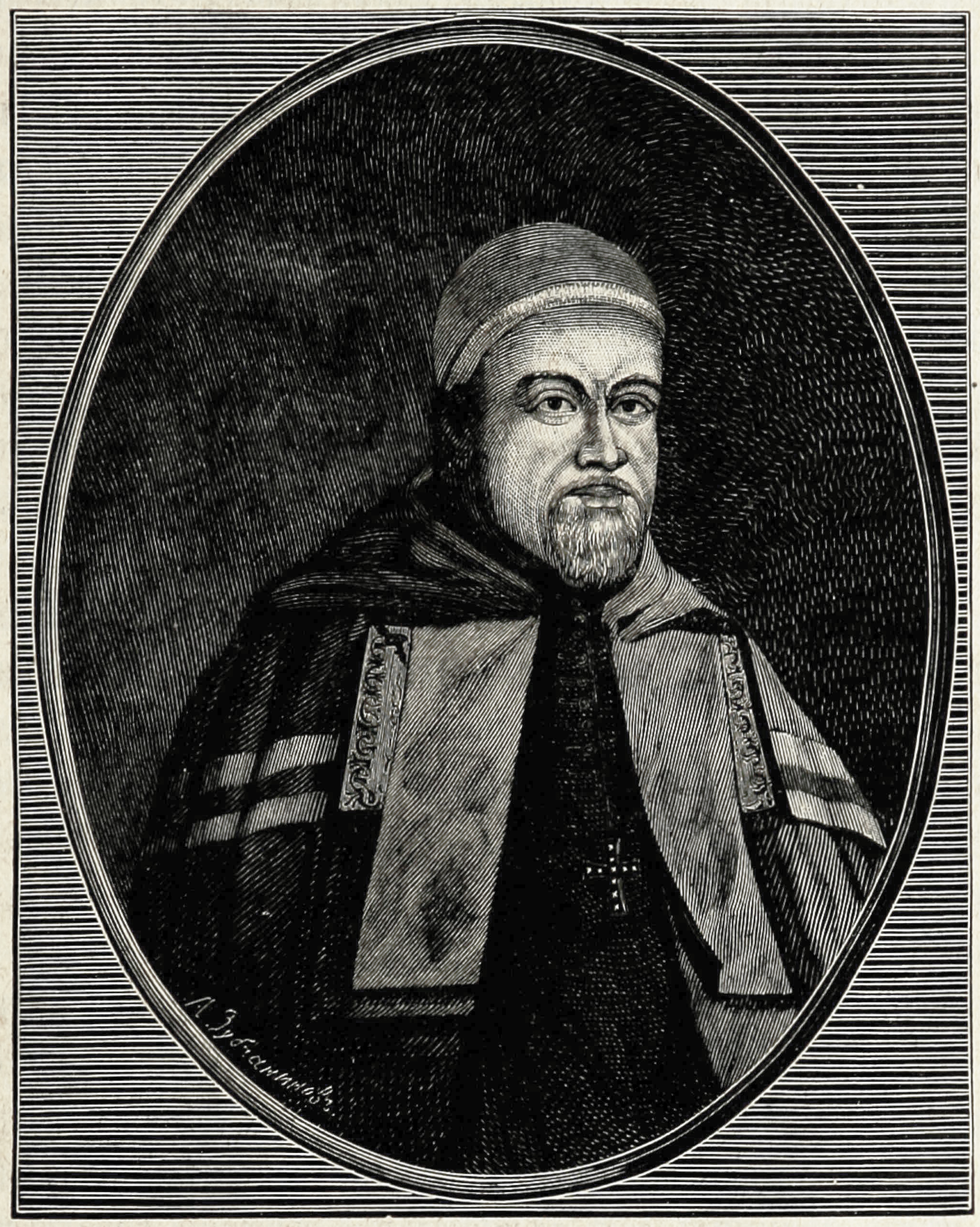
- Church: Ukrainian Greek Catholic Church
- Appointed: 17 September 1714
- Term ended: 19 November 1728
- Predecessor: Yurij Vynnyckyj
- Successor: Atanasy Sheptycky

Orders
- Consecration: 15 March 1711 (Bishop) by Yurij Vynnyckyj

Personal details
- Born: Luka Kiszka; 1663 Kovel, Volhynian
- Died: 19 November 1728 (aged 64–65) Kupieczow, near Volodymyr

Luka Lev Kiszka (Belarusian: Леў Кішка, Ukrainian: Лев Кішка, Polish: Leon Kiszka) (1663—1728) was the "Metropolitan of Kiev, Galicia and all Ruthenia" (Note: The title is also known as the Metropolis of Kiev, Halych and all Rus' or Metropolis of Kyiv, Halychyna, and All-Rus'. The name "Galicia" is a Latinized form of Halych, one of several regional principalities of the medieval state of Kievan Rus'.) of the Ukrainian Greek Catholic Church from 1714 to his death in 1728. He was also a writer, and theologian.

== Life ==
Luka Lev Kiszka was born in Kovel, in Volhynia, from a noble family in the year 1663. Still young he joined the Order of Saint Basil the Great and he studied in Byten (Ivatsevichy Raion). On 6 December 1687, already ordained a priest, he entered in the Pontifical Urbaniana University, in Rome, where he studied till 1691. Returned in his country, he served as hieromonk in various Basilian monasteries. In 1697 he became Hegumen of the monastery of the Holy Trinity in Vilnius and in 1699 he was appointed Archimandrite of the monastery of Polotsk. In 1698 he was elected secretary of the Basilian Order, of which he became Proto-Archimandrite (i.e. Superior general of the whole Order) in September 1703 for his first four-years term.

Kiszka ruled the Basilian Order in a very difficult period, during the Great Northern War (1700-1721), and under the persecutions of Peter I of Russia against the Greek Catholic Church, as the murder of Basilian monks on 11 July 1705 by the Tsar's own hand at Polotsk. He settled a typography and worked at printing religious and liturgical books.

Kiszka was re-elected Proto-Archimandrite of the Order and in 1711 he was appointed bishop of the eparchy of Volodymyr-Brest. Accordingly, he was consecrated bishop 15 March 1711 by the hands of Metropolitan Yurij Vynnyckyj in Sambir.

At the death of Metropolitan Vynnyckyj in September 1713, Kiszka became administrator of the Church, and on 17 September 1714 he was formally confirmed Metropolitan of Kiev by Pope Clement XI.

Kiszka died in the village of Kupieczow, near Volodymyr, where he was buried, on 19 November 1728.

== Synod of Zamość ==
Kiszka's more important result as Metropolitan of Kiev was the Synod of Zamość, opened on 26 August 1720, in which were codified the canons of the Ukrainian Greek Catholic Church. The synod issued nineteen chapters, concerning the faith (1), the predication (2), the sacraments (3), the diocesan organization (4 to 10), the monasteries (11, 12), the ecclesiastic estates (13, 14), the liturgical year and the saints (16, 17), and the promulgations of the canons (18, 19). The acts of the synod were approved by Rome on 5 December 1722.

== Works ==
Kiszka was a prolific writer. Among his works we remember:

- About the Sacraments, in Ukrainian, 1697
- The see of grace, or of the miracles of the Virgin Mary, in Polish, 1714
- Sermons of Metropolitan Ipatii Potii, 1714
- Instruction for parish priests and catechism for people, 1722
- Manuscript with various historical notes, which includes an Ecclesiastic History of the South of Russia from the original documents, lives of notable Basilian monks, a political history of Europe.

== Consecrations ==
- Hennadiy Bizantsiy (Greek Catholic Eparchy of Mukachevo)

== Notes ==
Ruthenian Uniate Church titles
Preceded by	Archimandrite of Holy Trinity Monastery; 1697 – 1699	Succeeded by
Preceded by Yuriy Vinnitski (as administrator)	Bishop of Wlodziemierz and Bresc; 1711 – 1714	Succeeded by Cornelius Stolpowicki-Liebecki
Preceded by Yuriy Vinnitski	Bishop of Przemysl and Sanok (as administrator); 1713 – 1715	Succeeded by Hieronim Ustrycki
Preceded by Yuriy Vinnitski	Metropolitan of Kiev, Galicia and all Ruthenia; 1714 – 1728	Succeeded by Athanasius Szeptycki
