= Oľšavica =

- Municipality
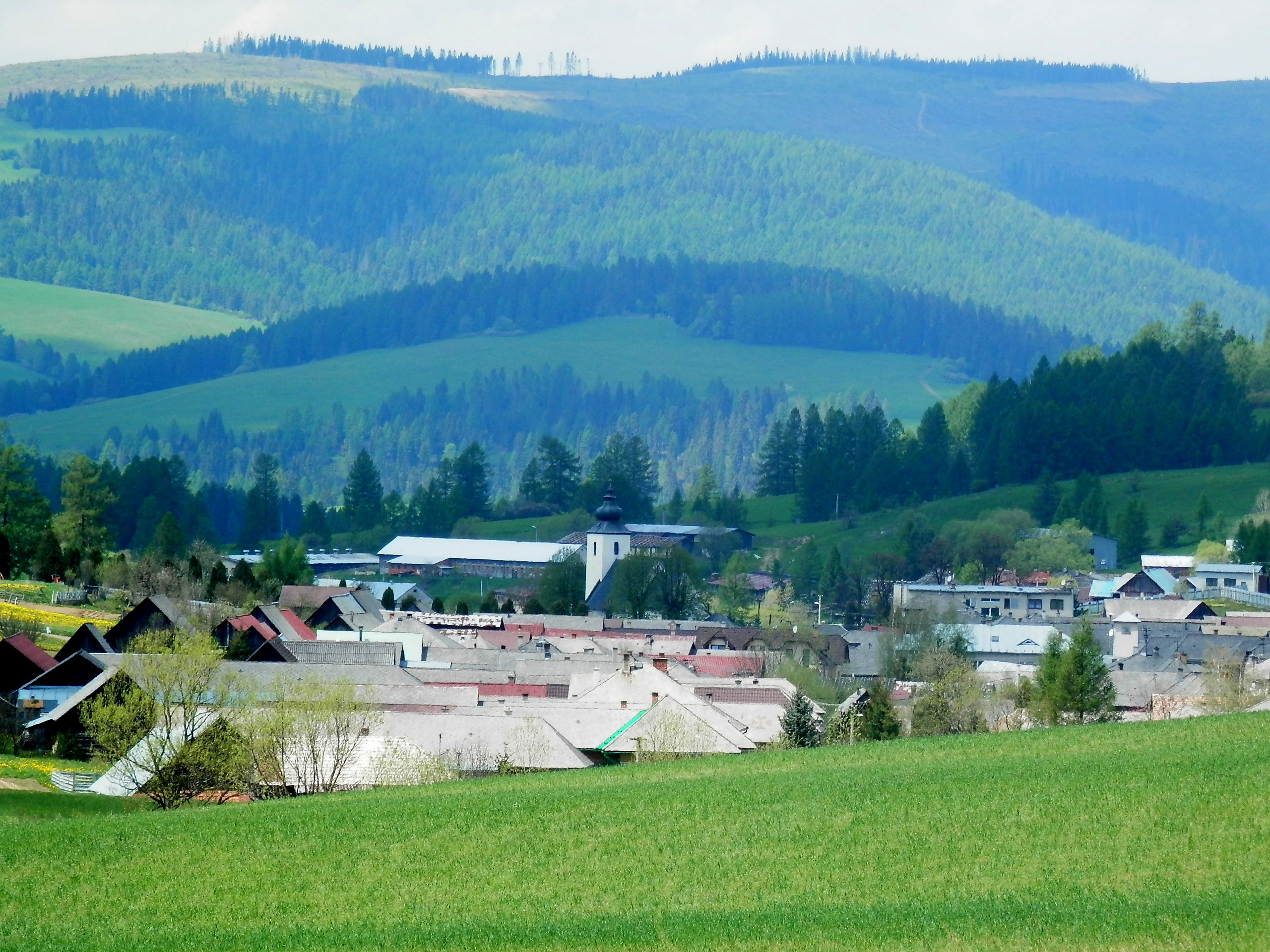

- Flag

- Location of Oľšavica in the Prešov Region Location of Oľšavica in Slovakia
- Coordinates: 49.08°N 20.75°E
- Country: Slovakia
- Region: Prešov Region
- District: Levoča District
- First mentioned: 1300

Area
  - Total: 17.60 km^{2} (6.80 sq mi)
- Elevation: 776 m (2,546 ft)

Population (2025)
  - Total: 236
- Time zone: UTC+1 (CET)
  - Summer (DST): UTC+2 (CEST)
- Postal code: 537 3
- Area code: +421 53
- Vehicle registration plate (until 2022): LE
- Website: obecolsavica.sk

Oľšavica is a village and obec in Levoča District in the Prešov Region of central-eastern Slovakia.

== History ==
The village was first mentioned in 1300 or 1308. From its establishment, villagers have followed the Greek Catholic faith; in 1700 there were 348 Greek Catholics out of 351 people living in the village. It is located in the Greek Catholic Metropolitan Archeparchy of Prešov. Two natives of the village, brothers Šimon Štefan and Michal Manuel Olšavský, made their hometown famous as bishops of the Greek Catholic Eparchy of Mukachevo in the eighteenth century. In the late nineteenth century, many villagers emigrated to the United States.

In 1944, the village was the site of a mass rescue of some 50 refugees, including 35 Jews who escaped the Holocaust in Slovakia, due to the exhortations of local Greek Catholic priest Michal Mašlej, who was held in high esteem by the farmers. Preaching that it was their Christian duty to help refugees, Mašlej arranged for persecuted families to hide with various parishioners, and hid the Hartmann family in his personal residence. When German troops had to be quartered in the village, he made sure that they were not placed with any of the families involved in the rescue effort. Mašlej's efforts were supported by his bishop, Pavel Peter Gojdič. When Mašlej was concerned about the danger to his congregants, Gojdič told him: "The support to the persecuted results of charity and it is your duty according to your capacity to help and to provide shelter to the threatened by deportation". Researcher Nina Paulovičová compared Oľšavica to Nieuwlande and Le Chambon-sur-Lignon—other villages where the population banded together to hide Jews—adding that it was "remarkable" that no one informed on the fugitives and none of them were arrested. Mašlej was recognized as Righteous Among the Nations by the Israeli official Holocaust memorial, Yad Vashem, in 1997.

== Geography ==
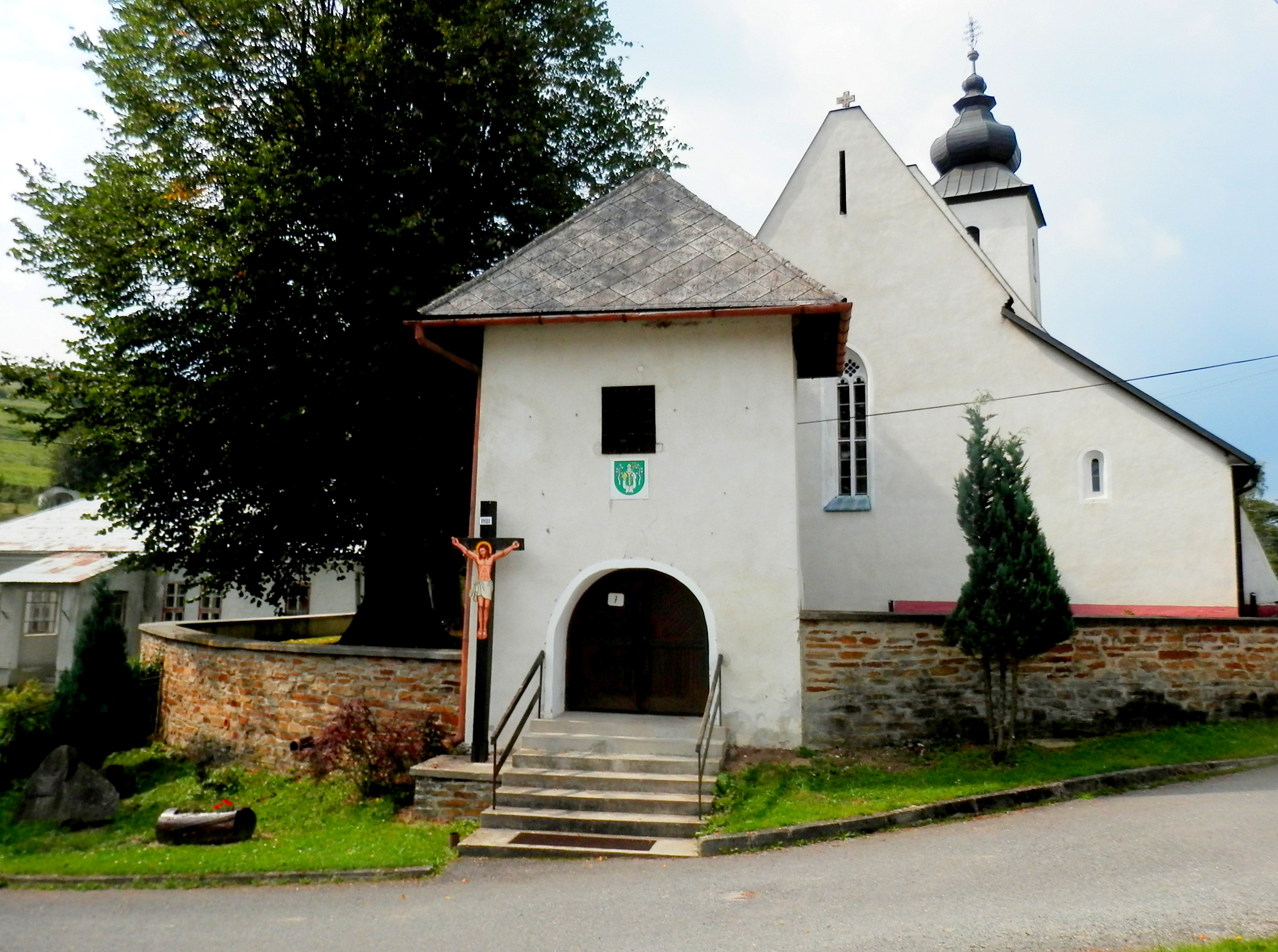
The Greek Catholic church in Oľšavica

The municipality lies at an altitude of 776 metres (2,546 ft) and covers an area of 17.60 km^{2} (6.80 sq mi) (2025). Geographically, it is dominated by the nearby Spišská hill, at 1,065 metres (3,494 ft). It is bordered by Brutovce to the east, Tichý Potok to the north, Nižné Repaše to the west, Pavľany to the south, and Poproč to the southeast.

== Population ==
Population statistic (10 years)
| Year | 1995 | 2005 | 2015 | 2025 |
|---|---|---|---|---|
| Count | 336 | 306 | 271 | 236 |
| Difference | | −8.92% | −11.43% | −12.91% |

Population statistic
| Year | 2024 | 2025 |
|---|---|---|
| Count | 232 | 236 |
| Difference | | +1.72% |

It has a population of 236 people (31 December 2025).

=== Ethnicity ===
Census 2021 (1+ %)
| Ethnicity | Number | Fraction |
|---|---|---|
| Slovak | 231 | 90.23% |
| Rusyn | 108 | 42.18% |
| Not found out | 8 | 3.12% |
| Total | 256 | |

In year 2021 was 256 people by ethnicity 231 as Slovak, 108 as Rusyn and 8 as Not found out.

Note on population: The difference values of population numbers in the table "Population statistic" and in the sections "Ethnicity" & "Religion" is caused by the use of various statistical methods.

=== Religion ===
Census 2021 (1+ %)
| Religion | Number | Fraction |
|---|---|---|
| Greek Catholic Church | 214 | 83.59% |
| Roman Catholic Church | 24 | 9.38% |
| None | 12 | 4.69% |
| Not found out | 5 | 1.95% |
| Total | 256 | |

In year 2021 was 256 people by religion 214 from Greek Catholic Church, 24 from Roman Catholic Church, 12 from None, 5 from Not found out and 1 from Paganism and natural spirituality.

== Landmarks and tourist attraction ==
The church in the village was built in 1861 and is consecrated to Our Lady of Protection.
