= Ivan Bradach =

Ivan Bradach O.S.M.B.
- Bishop of Mukachevo
- Church: Ruthenian Greek Catholic Church
- Diocese: Eparchy of Mukachevo
- In office: 27 January 1768 – 4 July 1772
- Predecessor: Manuil Olshavskyi
- Successor: Andriy Bachynskyi
- Previous posts: Titular Bishop of Rhosus (1768-1771); Vicar Apostolic of Mukachevo (1768-1771)

Orders
- Ordination: 30 September 1755
- Consecration: 20 April 1768 by Meletie Covaci

Personal details
- Born: 14 February 1732 Tarcafő, Kingdom of Hungary, Habsburg Realm
- Died: 4 July 1772 (aged 40) Mukacheve, Kingdom of Hungary, Habsburg Realm

Ivan Bradach, O.S.B.M. (Ukrainian: Іван Брадач, Hungarian: Bradács János; 14 February 1732 – 4 July 1772) was a Ruthenian Greek Catholic hierarch. He was the titular bishop of Rhosus and the last Vicar Apostolic for the Ruthenians from 1768 to 1771 and the first eparchial bishop of the newly created Ruthenian Catholic Eparchy of Mukacheve from 1771 to 1772.

Born in Torysky, Habsburg monarchy (present day – Slovakia) in 1732, he was ordained a priest on 30 September 1755 for the Basilian Order. Ivan Bradach was an older brother of a future Bishop Mykhaylo Bradach and nephew of Bishops Stefan Olshavskyi and Manuil Olshavskyi. At the death of his predecessor, he was appointed, on 27 January 1768 as general vicar by the Latin bishop of Eger and the Vicar Apostolic for the Ruthenians with titular see of Rhosus. He was consecrated to the Episcopate on 20 April 1768. The principal consecrator was Bishop Meletie Covaci. On 23 September 1771 Bishop Bradach was confirmed as the first bishop of the Eparchy of Mukacheve.

He died in Mukacheve on 4 July 1772.

Catholic Church titles
| Preceded by Manuil Olshavskyi | Vicar Apostolic of Mukacheve; 1768–1771 | Succeeded by himself, as first Eparchial Bishop |
| Preceded by himself, as last Vicar Apostolic | Ruthenian Catholic Eparchy of Mukacheve; 1771–1772 | Succeeded by Andriy Bachynskyi |
