= Torysky =

Village and municipality in Levoča District in Slovakia

- Municipality
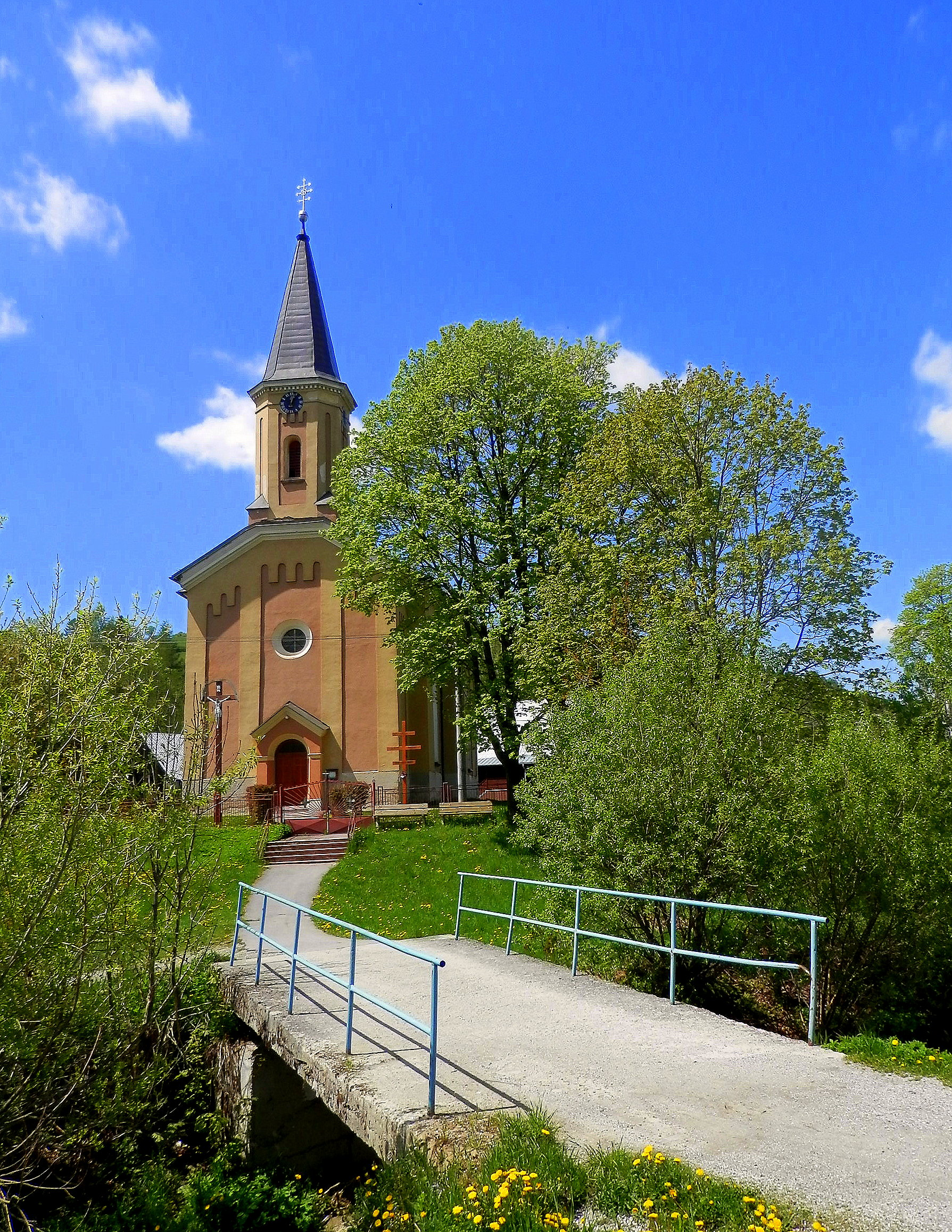

- Flag

- Location of Torysky in the Prešov Region Location of Torysky in Slovakia
- Coordinates: 49.10°N 20.68°E
- Country: Slovakia
- Region: Prešov Region
- District: Levoča District
- First mentioned: 1284

Area
  - Total: 6.98 km^{2} (2.69 sq mi)
- Elevation: 802 m (2,631 ft)

Population (2025)
  - Total: 318
- Time zone: UTC+1 (CET)
  - Summer (DST): UTC+2 (CEST)
- Postal code: 537 2
- Area code: +421 53
- Vehicle registration plate (until 2022): LE
- Website: www.torysky.sk

Torysky (Hungarian: Tarcafő) is a village and municipality in Levoča District in the Prešov Region of central-eastern Slovakia.

== History ==
In historical records the village was first mentioned in 1284.

Here was born the Catholic Bishop of Mukacheve Ivan Bradach (1732 – 1772).

== Geography ==
The municipality lies at an altitude of 802 metres (2,631 ft) and covers an area of 6.98 km^{2} (2.69 sq mi) (2025).

== Population ==
Population statistic (10 years)
Year	1995	2005	2015	2025
Count	437	395	341	318
Difference		−9.61%	−13.67%	−6.74%

Population statistic
Year	2024	2025
Count	321	318
Difference		−0.93%

It has a population of 318 people (31 December 2025).

=== Ethnicity ===
Census 2021 (1+ %)
Ethnicity	Number	Fraction
Slovak	240	73.39%
Rusyn	192	58.71%
Not found out	14	4.28%
Total	327	

In year 2021 was 327 people by ethnicity 240 as Slovak, 192 as Rusyn, 14 as Not found out, 1 as Czech, 1 as Polish, 1 as German and 1 as Other.

Note on population: The difference values of population numbers in the table "Population statistic" and in the sections "Ethnicity" & "Religion" is caused by the use of various statistical methods.

=== Religion ===
Census 2021 (1+ %)
Religion	Number	Fraction
Greek Catholic Church	259	79.2%
Roman Catholic Church	50	15.29%
Not found out	8	2.45%
None	4	1.22%
Total	327	

In year 2021 was 327 people by religion 259 from Greek Catholic Church, 50 from Roman Catholic Church, 8 from Not found out, 4 from None, 2 from Calvinist Church, 2 from Eastern Orthodox Church, 1 from Jehovah's Witnesses and 1 from Other.
