= Blažov (Javorina) =

Former municipality in Slovakia

Coordinates: 49°08′58.1″N 20°44′55.8″E

Blažov (Hungarian: Balázsvágás; Rusyn: Блажів) was a municipality (village) in Slovakia. It was one of the villages that ceased to exist in the course of the creation of the municipality-military area Javorina on their territory in 1953.

Former names: Blaziv, Blasenau, Balázsvágás

A native of this village was the Greek-Catholic bishop in Mukacheve, Havryil Blazhovskyi (c.1705–1742).

- 561 m / 1870 feet above sea level
- The valley of the upper Torysa River
- The Levoča (Lewocha) Hills
- the highest hills: Čierna hora / Black Mount (1289.4 m / 4232 ft.), Škapová (1231.9 m / 4042 ft.)
- The north-western corner of the Sabinov District
- Prešov Region
