= Beňatina =

Village and municipality in Slovakia

Beňatina Vadászfalva
- Municipality
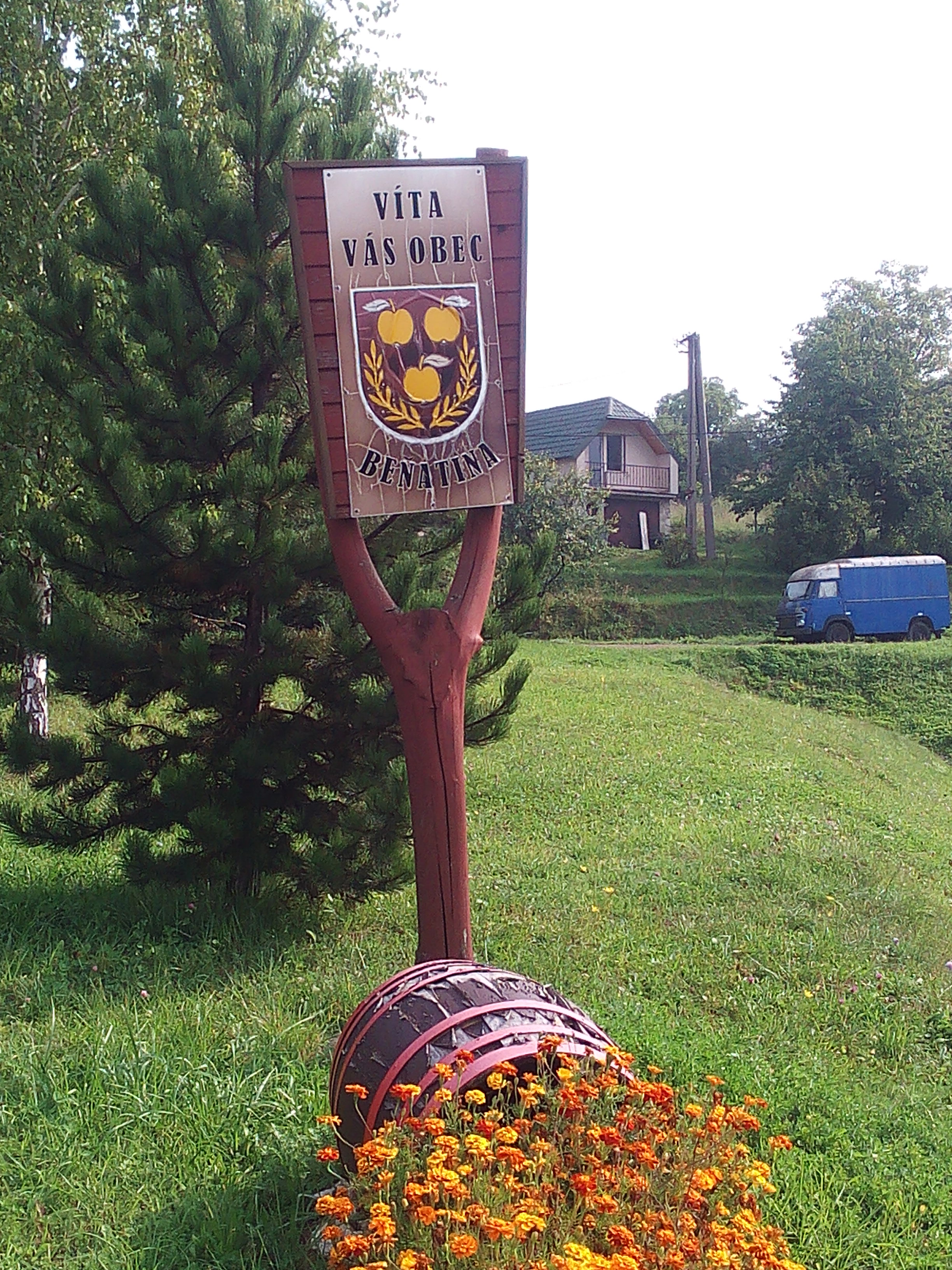

- Flag

- Location of Beňatina in the Košice Region Location of Beňatina in Slovakia
- Coordinates: 48.82°N 22.33°E
- Country: Slovakia
- Region: Košice Region
- District: Sobrance District
- First mentioned: 1333

Area
  - Total: 18.64 km^{2} (7.20 sq mi)
- Elevation: 406 m (1,332 ft)

Population (2025)
  - Total: 163
- Time zone: UTC+1 (CET)
  - Summer (DST): UTC+2 (CEST)
- Postal code: 726 4
- Area code: +421 56
- Vehicle registration plate (until 2022): SO
- Website: www.benatina.sk

Beňatina (Hungarian: Vadászfalva; Rusyn: Бенятина) is a village and municipality in the Sobrance District in the Košice Region of east Slovakia.

== History ==
In historical records the village was first mentioned in 1333. Before the establishment of independent Czechoslovakia in 1918, Beňatina was part of Ung County within the Kingdom of Hungary. In 1939, it was for a short time part of the Slovak Republic. As a result of the Slovak–Hungarian War of 1939, it was again part of Hungary from 1939 to 1944. In the autumn of 1944, the Red Army entered Beňatina and it was once again part of Czechoslovakia.

== Geography ==
The municipality lies at an altitude of 406 metres (1,332 ft) and covers an area of 18.64 km^{2} (7.20 sq mi) (2025).

== Population ==
Population statistic (10 years)
Year	1995	2005	2015	2025
Count	290	254	191	163
Difference		−12.41%	−24.80%	−14.65%

Population statistic
Year	2024	2025
Count	168	163
Difference		−2.97%

It has a population of 163 people (31 December 2025).

=== Ethnicity ===
Census 2021 (1+ %)
Ethnicity	Number	Fraction
Slovak	167	88.35%
Rusyn	75	39.68%
Not found out	7	3.7%
Czech	6	3.17%
Total	189	

In year 2021 was 189 people by ethnicity 167 as Slovak, 75 as Rusyn, 7 as Not found out, 6 as Czech and 1 as Ukrainian.

Note on population: The difference values of population numbers in the table "Population statistic" and in the sections "Ethnicity" & "Religion" is caused by the use of various statistical methods.

=== Religion ===
Census 2021 (1+ %)
Religion	Number	Fraction
Eastern Orthodox Church	85	44.97%
Greek Catholic Church	84	44.44%
Roman Catholic Church	8	4.23%
Not found out	6	3.17%
Jehovah's Witnesses	3	1.59%
None	3	1.59%
Total	189	

In year 2021 was 189 people by religion 85 from Eastern Orthodox Church, 84 from Greek Catholic Church, 8 from Roman Catholic Church, 6 from Not found out, 3 from Jehovah's Witnesses and 3 from None.

== Culture ==
The village has a public library, and a football pitch

== Genealogical resources ==
The records for genealogical research are available at the state archive "Statny Archiv in Presov, Slovakia"

- Roman Catholic church records (births/marriages/deaths): 1837-1931 (parish B)

- Greek Catholic church records (births/marriages/deaths): 1824-1851 (parish B)

== See also ==
- List of municipalities and towns in Slovakia
