= Kokad =

- Location of Kokad in Hungary
- Coordinates: 47.407°N 21.941°E
- Country: Hungary
- County: Hajdú-Bihar

Government
  - Mayor: Ozsváth István

Area
  - Total: 16.10 km^{2} (6.22 sq mi)

Population (2011)
  - Total: 669
  - Density: 41.6/km^{2} (108/sq mi)
- Time zone: UTC+1 (CET)
  - Summer (DST): UTC+2 (CEST)
- Postal code: 4284
- Area code: 52

Kokad is a village in Hajdú-Bihar county, in the Northern Great Plain region of eastern Hungary.

== Geography ==
It covers an area of 16.10 km^{2} (6 sq mi) and has a population of 669 people (2011).
