= Manuil Olshavskyi =

Manuil Mykhaylo Olshavskyi
- Eparch of Mukacheve
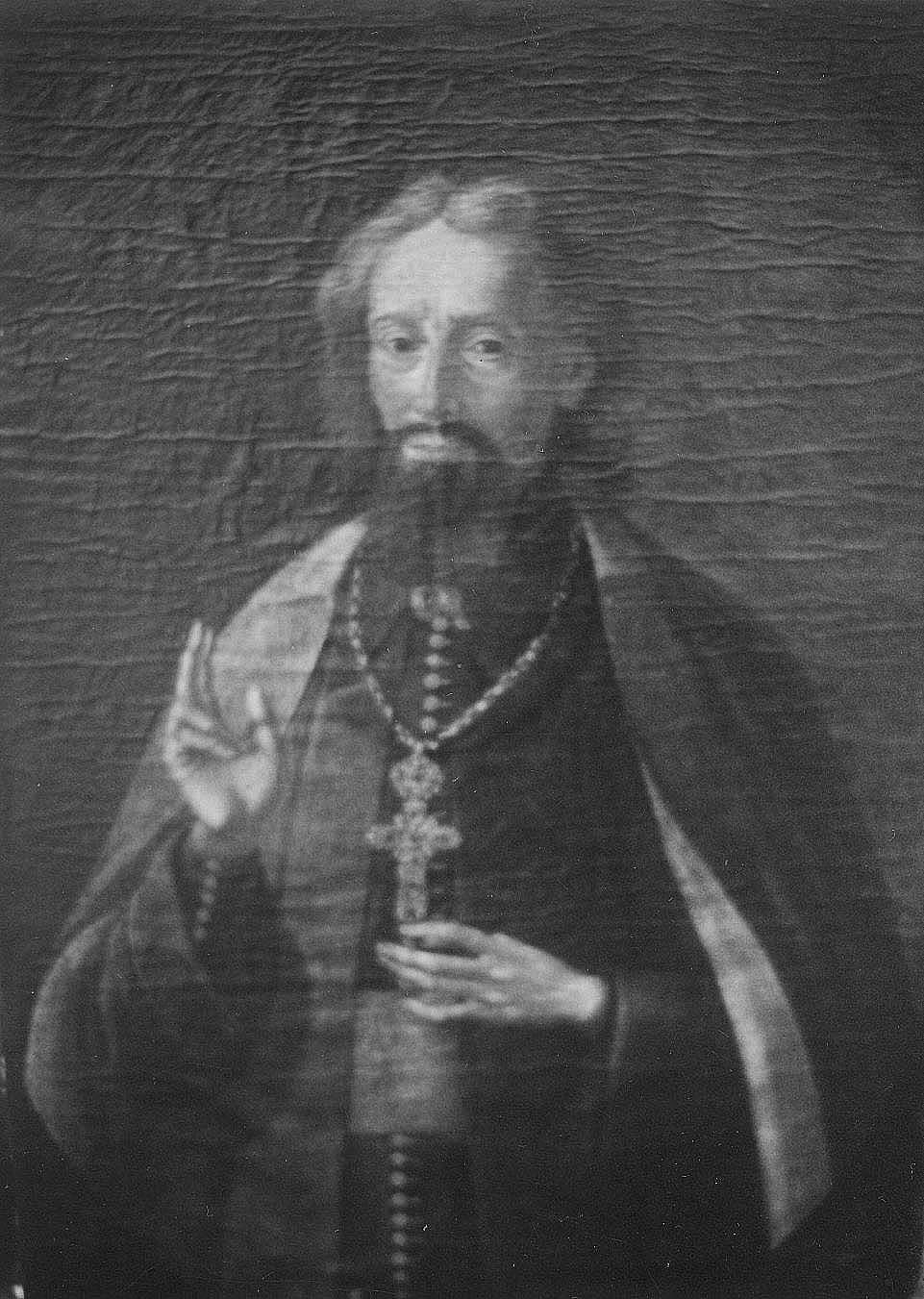
- Church: Ruthenian Catholic Church
- Diocese: Vicar Apostolic for the Ruthenians in Mukacheve
- Appointed: 5 September 1743
- Term ended: 5 November 1767
- Predecessor: Havryil Blazhovskyi
- Successor: Ivan Bradach

Orders
- Ordination: 1725 (Priest) by Hennadiy Bizantsiy
- Consecration: 9 Dec 1743 (Bishop) by Inocenţiu Micu-Klein

Personal details
- Born: Michal Židik about 1700 Oľšavica
- Died: 5 November 1767 (aged 66–67) Mukachevo

Manuil Mykhaylo Olshavskyi, O.S.B.M., (born as Michal Židik; Ukrainian: Мануїл Михайло Ольшавський, Hungarian: Manó Mihály Olsavszky, Slovak: Manuel Michal Olšavský, c. 1700 – 5 November 1767) was the bishop of the Vicariate Apostolic for the Ruthenians in Mukacheve from 1743 to his death in 1767.

== Life ==
Mykhaylo Olshavskyi was born in about 1700 in the village of Oľšavica, from which he took his surname (which originally was Židik). He studied philosophy in Košice and then in the Jesuit college of Trnava. At the end of his studies, he was ordained a secular priest in 1725 and assigned to the Eparchy of Mukacheve, where he later became vicar of the eparchs (bishops) Stefan Olshavskyi (who was his older brother) and Havryil Blazhovskyi.

At the death of his predecessor, he was appointed on 8 February 1743 as vicar general by the Latin Bishop of Eger: as at that time, following the Union of Uzhhorod, the eparch of Mukacheve was formally an apostolic vicar of the Latin diocese. In a few months he was elected to the position by the clergy, designated by the Empress Maria Theresa, and so confirmed by Pope Benedict XIV on 5 September 1743. He received the titular see of Rhosus and was consecrated bishop on 9 December 1743 by the bishop of Făgăraş, Inocenţiu Micu-Klein. A short time before consecration, Mykhaylo Olshavskyi entered the Order of Saint Basil the Great and took the religious name of Manuil.

In 1746, Empress Maria Theresa requested Manuil Olshavskyi to undertake a pastoral visit to Transylvania, that was at the time without a Byzantine Catholic bishop due to the exile of Micu-Klein. He again returned to Transylvania in 1761 to address, with his authority and predication, the disturbance fomented by the Orthodox monk Sofronie.

In 1756, Olshavskyi completed and consecrated the sanctuary of Máriapócs which was started by his predecessor Gennadius Bizanczy. To serve the sanctuary, he built a monastery and assigned it to the Basilian monks. He also built schools in Mukachevo and in Máriapócs for the instruction of the clergy, and succeeded in obtaining the necessary funding. While his predecessors in Mukachevo lived in the Saint Nicholas Monastery, by request of the monks, he built an episcopal residence in town. In 1764 he built, with his own money, a school of theology and one for cantors in Mukachevo.

In 1759 he could write to Propaganda Fide that in his eparchy there remained no Byzantine faithful who were not in communion with the Catholic Church. However, the jurisdictional situation of his eparchy, formally an apostolic vicariate under the Latin Bishop of Eger, was not satisfactory. So Manuil Olshavskyi contested the authority of the Bishop of Eger and tried to persuade Empress Maria Theresa to give full independence to the eparchy. He could not see the results of his work, but four years after his death, in 1771, the Eparchy of Mukacheve got its independence.

Manuil Olshavskyi died in Mukachevo on 5 November 1767, and he was buried in the sanctuary of Máriapócs.

Among his most memorable works might be his Sermon et orientale de Sacra eccidentalem inter Unione quo ecclesia episcopus Rossensis.

== Notes ==
Catholic Church titles
Preceded by Havryil Blazhovskyi	Vicar Apostolic for the Ruthenians in Mukacheve; 1743–1767	Succeeded by Ivan Bradach
