= Athanasius Szeptycki =

Metropolitan of Kiev, Galicia and all Ruthenia (1729–1746)

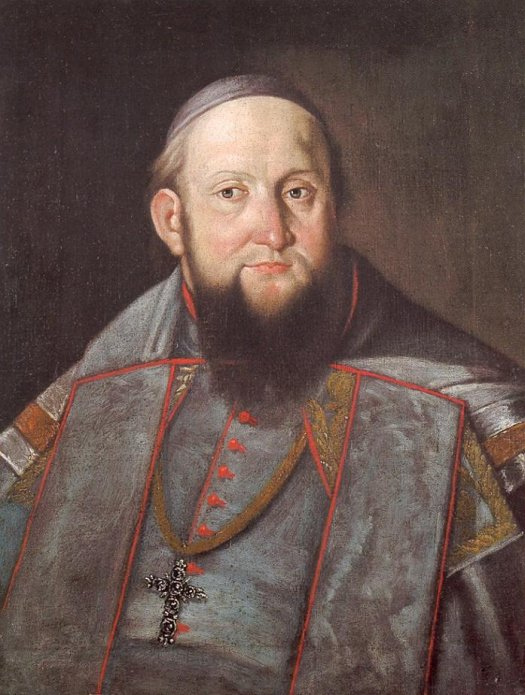

Athanasius Szeptycki (born as Antoni Alexandrowycz Szeptycki; Ukrainian: Атанасій Шептицький; 1686 – 12 December 1746, Lviv) was the "Metropolitan of Kiev, Galicia and all Ruthenia" (Note: The title is also known as the Metropolis of Kiev, Halych and all Rus' or Metropolis of Kyiv, Halychyna, and All-Rus'. The name "Galicia" is a Latinized form of Halych, one of several regional principalities of the medieval state of Kievan Rus'.)

On 13 September 1715 Szeptycki was ordained by Primate of the Uniate church Leo Kiszka as a bishop of Lemberg.

Soon after the death of Metropolitan Leo, On 17 August 1729 he was confirmed as the Metropolitan bishop of Kiev, Galicia, and all Ruthenia.

He consecrated following bishops Kornyliy Lebiecki, Juriy Bulhak, Felician Wolodkowicz, Stefan Olshavskyi, Havryil Blazhovskyi, Onuphrius Szumlanski, Hieronim Ustrycki, Theodosius Godebski, Jacob Augustynowicz.

== Notes ==
Ruthenian Uniate Church titles
Preceded by	Archimandrite of Univ Lavra; 1715 – 1746	Succeeded by
Preceded by Barlaam Szpetycki	Bishop of Lemberg and Galicia; 1713 – 1715	Succeeded by Onuphrius Szumlanski
Preceded by Leo Kiszka	Metropolitan of Kiev, Galicia and all Ruthenia; 1729 – 1746	Succeeded by Florian Hrebnicki
