= Javorina =

Military district in the Kežmarok District in northern Slovakia

Coordinates: 49°16′N 20°09′E

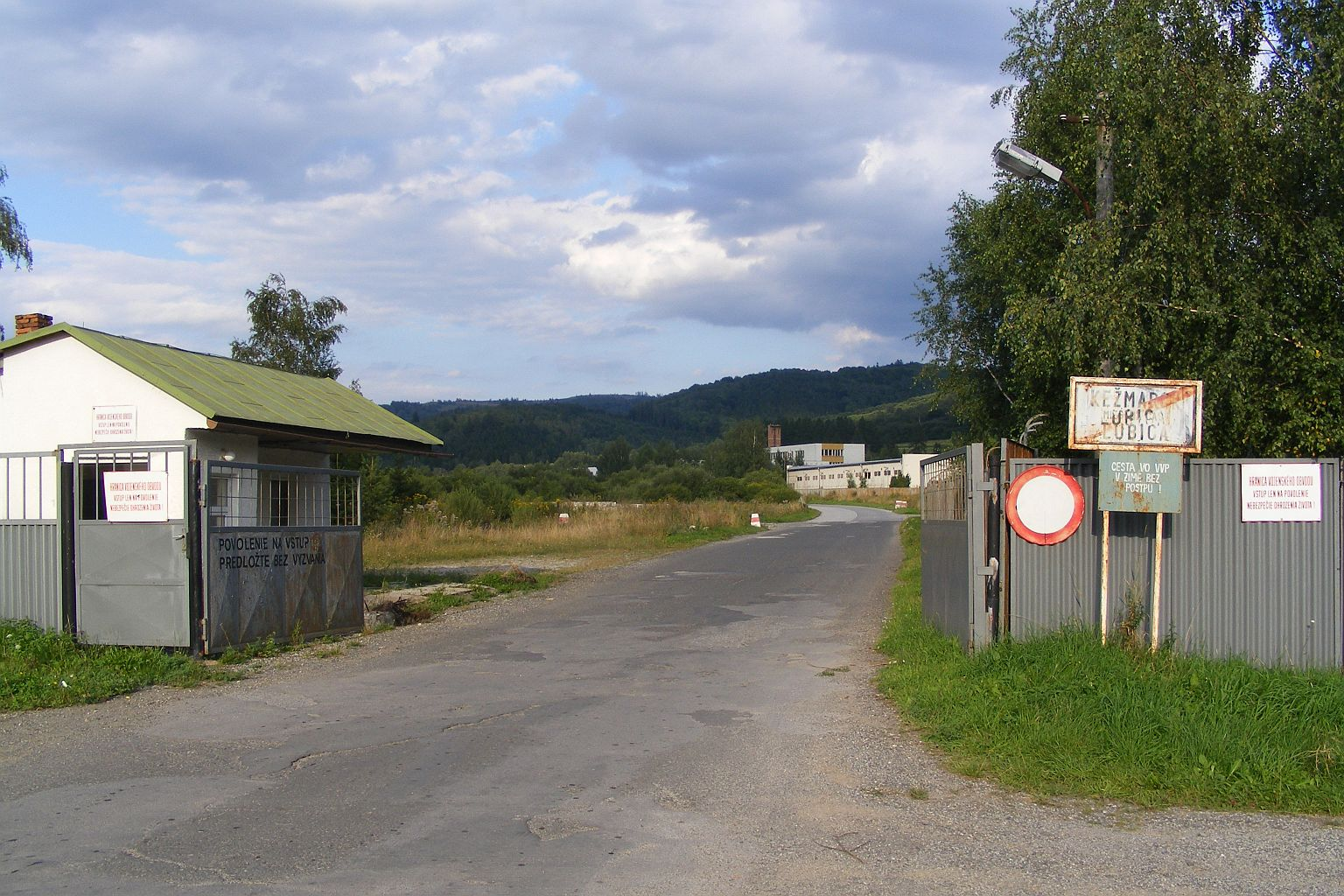
Entrance to the military area

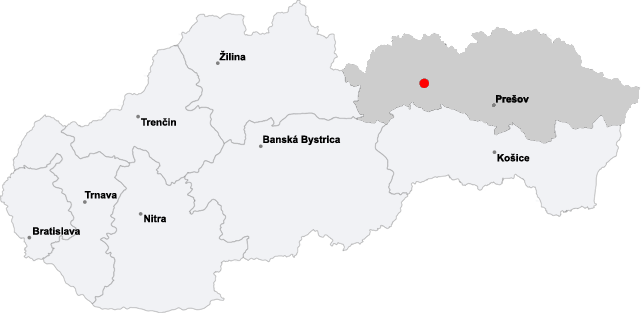
Location of Javorina within Slovakia

Javorina was a military district in the Kežmarok District in northern Slovakia, in the Levoča Hills. Its area is 316.24 km^{2} and has no permanent population.

== History ==
The military district was created in 1952. It was created from the whole cadastral area of four villages (Blažov, Dvorce, Ruskinovce, Ľubické Kúpeľe) and from partial cadastral area of another 22 villages. The district was dissolved in 2011.

== Genealogical resources ==
The records for genealogical research are available at the state archive "Statny Archiv in Levoca, Presov, Slovakia"

- Roman Catholic church records (births/marriages/deaths): 1838-1896 (parish B)
- Greek Catholic church records (births/marriages/deaths): 1812-1899 (parish B)

== See also ==
- List of municipalities and towns in Slovakia
