= Velykyi Rakovets =

Coordinates: 48°15′36″N 23°9′0″E

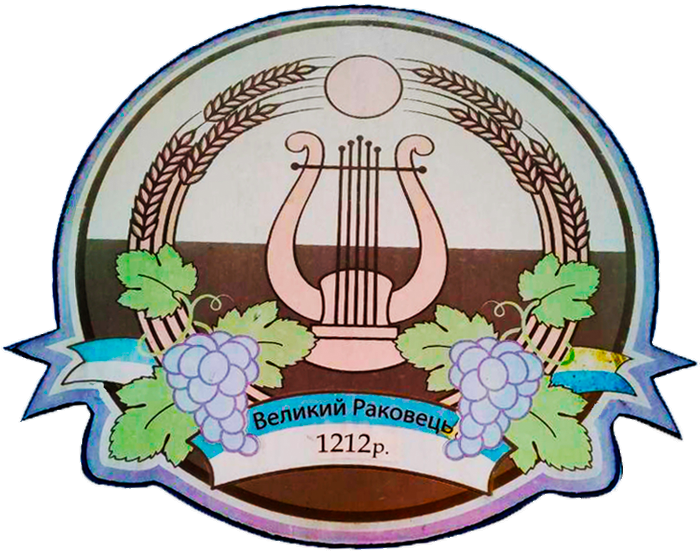
Coat of arms of the village Velykyi Rakovets.

Velykyi Rakovets (Ukrainian: Великий Раковець; Rusyn: Великый Раковиць; Hungarian: Nagy-Rákócz, Nagyrákóc, Rákóc, Rákócz, Rakowec; Slovak: Veľký Rakovec) is a village located in western Ukraine, within the Khust Raion in Zakarpattia Oblast, although it was formerly administered under Irshava Raion.

It had a population of 4,549 according to the 2001 census.

== See also ==
- Carpathian Ruthenia
