= Olszewski tube =

Pipe designed to bring oxygen-poor water from the bottom of a lake to the top

An Olszewski tube is a pipe designed to bring oxygen-poor water from the bottom of a lake to the top. This tube was first proposed by a Polish limnologist named Przemysław Olszewski in 1961 and helps combat the negative effects of eutrophication, high nutrient content, in lakes. The basic concept behind the Olszewski tube is the reduction of nutrient concentration and destratification; the more specific goal is hypolimnetic withdrawal.

== Eutrophication ==
When nutrients build up in a lake, eutrophication occurs, and this generally occurs in the top layer of a lake. The nutrients come both naturally and artificially and usually contain phosphates. The artificial nutrients can come from sewage and fertilizers, from agricultural runoff. Phosphorus from the phosphates causes algae to grow rapidly and spread throughout the top layer of the lake. Algal blooms have negative effects on both the aesthetics and the ecology of the lake. Aesthetically, the lake is not pleasing because it is covered with algae. Ecologically, eutrophication causes organisms in the lake to die because the algae deplete the dissolved oxygen in the lake.

== Design ==
Working principle of an Olszewski tube (below)

At the most simple level, the Olszewski tube is a pipe that spans from the bottom, hypolimnetic layer of the lake to the outlet. The outlet part of the pipe is installed under lake level in order for the device to act as a siphon. Once warm water flows in the lake at the surface, it forces the cold anoxic water of the hypolimnetic layer through and up the tube. This oxygen-poor water is then brought to the top of the lake where the eutrophication occurs. This eventually helps the lake as a whole because the bottom of the lake will have more dissolved oxygen and the top of the lake will have less eutrophication.

== Implementations ==
The first implementation of the Olszewski tube was attempted at Lake Kortowo in Poland and this led to oligotrophication, reduction of nutrient cycling. This tube has shown the most promise in a 3.9 meter deep eutrophic lake in Switzerland because the phosphorus and nitrogen levels in the summer drastically decreased, oxygen levels increased, and the amount of cyanobacteria decreased from 152 grams per square meter to 41 grams per square meter. It has also been reported by a scientist named Bjork that there have been successes with the Olszewski tube in European lakes. Other limnologists like Pechlaner and Gachter have reported successes in small lakes where the total phosphorus decreased, transparency of water increased, and less algae was present.

== Complications ==
Some complications that can arise with the use of an Olszewski tube include disruption of the thermocline and excessive water loss. The thermocline separates the upper layer of water that is mixed temperatures with the deeper, cooler water. If the thermocline is disrupted, it could alter the ecology of the lake, potentially making it uninhabitable. Another complication is that the installation must be a long-term process. Short-term uses of Olszewski tubes have largely failed because it takes some time for the anoxic condition of the hypolimnetic layer to increase in dissolved oxygen. Also, it must be a slow process in order to avoid disrupting the thermocline in a lake. If the Olszewski tube is operated slowly enough, the rate of water going in and going out will be fairly constant causing the thermocline to stay intact.

== Cost ==
One advantage to hypolimnetic withdrawal is that it is relatively inexpensive to install an Olszewski tube or any similar device. Along with low initial cost, it also has a relatively low annual maintenance cost. The following are four systems installed in the United States (2002), their area in hectares, the rate of flow in cube-meters per minute, and their initial installation costs in US dollars:

- Lake Ballinger

41 ha
3.4 m^{3}/min
$420,000

- Lake Waramaug

287 ha
6.3 m^{3}/min
$62,000

- Devil's Lake

151 ha
9.1 m^{3}/min
$310,000

- Pine Lake

412 ha
5.3 m^{3}/min
$282,000

== Other Techniques ==
Aside from using an Olszewski tube and hypolimnetic withdrawal, there are other techniques implemented to achieve the same goals as an Olszewski tube. These include increasing dissolved oxygen, reducing nutrient concentration, and lessening the amount of algae and unwanted biomass in lakes.

- Sediment oxidation is the artificial oxidation of the top 15 to 20 centimeters of anaerobic lake sediment. This technique reduces internal nutrient release through a series of chemical reactions starting with iron(III) chloride. After these reactions, the concentrations of phosphorus and ammonium (another nutrient found in lakes) decrease and the demand for oxygen gas in reduced as well. This technique is still not fully developed yet but can mirror the effects of the Olszewski tube.
- Biological control methods are the most promising techniques because they do the least harm to the ecosystem. These methods introduce a particular species (e.g. fish, bacteria, etc.) into a lake as a solution to a current problem. The introduction of a certain type of bacteria can help decrease nutrients. In turn the algae will not spread and the oxygen in the lake will stay in high dissolved concentrations.
- Hypolimnetic aeration is another technique in which oxygen is added to the lake. This helps increase the concentration of dissolved oxygen in the lake as well as bring down the levels of phosphorus. While the results of this technique are similar to those of the Olszewski tube, hypolimnetic aeration differs in that it uses compressed air to move the water rather than a siphoning effect.
