= Meletie Covaci =

Aromanian Catholic bishop

- Church: Romanian Greek Catholic Church
- Diocese: Diocese of Oradea Mare
- Installed: 16 September 1748
- Term ended: 11 April 1775

Personal details
- Born: 1707 Naousa, Ottoman Empire (now Greece)
- Died: 11 April 1775 (aged 67–68) Oradea, Habsburg monarchy (now Romania)

Meletie Covaci (1707 – 11 April 1775) was an Aromanian Catholic bishop in the Habsburg monarchy.

== Biography ==
Born in Naousa, in the Ottoman Empire (now in Greece), to Eastern Orthodox parents, Covaci was an Aromanian. He fled to the north of the Danube and was ordained priest on 29 June 1734 by Isaija Antonović, Serbian Orthodox bishop of Arad, and in 1736 converted to the Greek-Catholic Church in a religious ceremony in Oradea, first as a wig of Diosig and then as a fortress of castle. Covaci became a Catholic priest and then a protopope in Diosig and after in Oradea, where he was proposed by the priests to the episcopate.

On 16 September 1748 Pope Benedict XIV named him auxiliary bishop of the Latin Rite Oradea Diocese, in charge of its Romanian Greek-Catholic parishes and was consecrated titular bishop of Tegea in the Byzantine Rite by Manuil Olshavskyi, Vicar Apostolic of Mukacheve. This arrangement did not satisfy the diocese's Romanians, who wanted an independent diocese, a separate cathedral, Romanian schools, their own seminary and monastery, and better pay for their priests and archpriests. Covaci pressed these demands, and in 1756 he asked Empress Maria Theresa, through the Lieutenant Council, to establish "popular schools" in Oradea, Beiuş and Vaşcău. The Empress responded positively to this request as it can be seen in the Sematics of the Latin Diocese of Oradea in 1765, p. 164. However, Covaci only obtained better funding for clergy in the 95 parishes (divided into eight archpriests' districts) extant in 1765.

He died on 11 April 1775 in Oradea.
