= Tichý Potok =

- Municipality
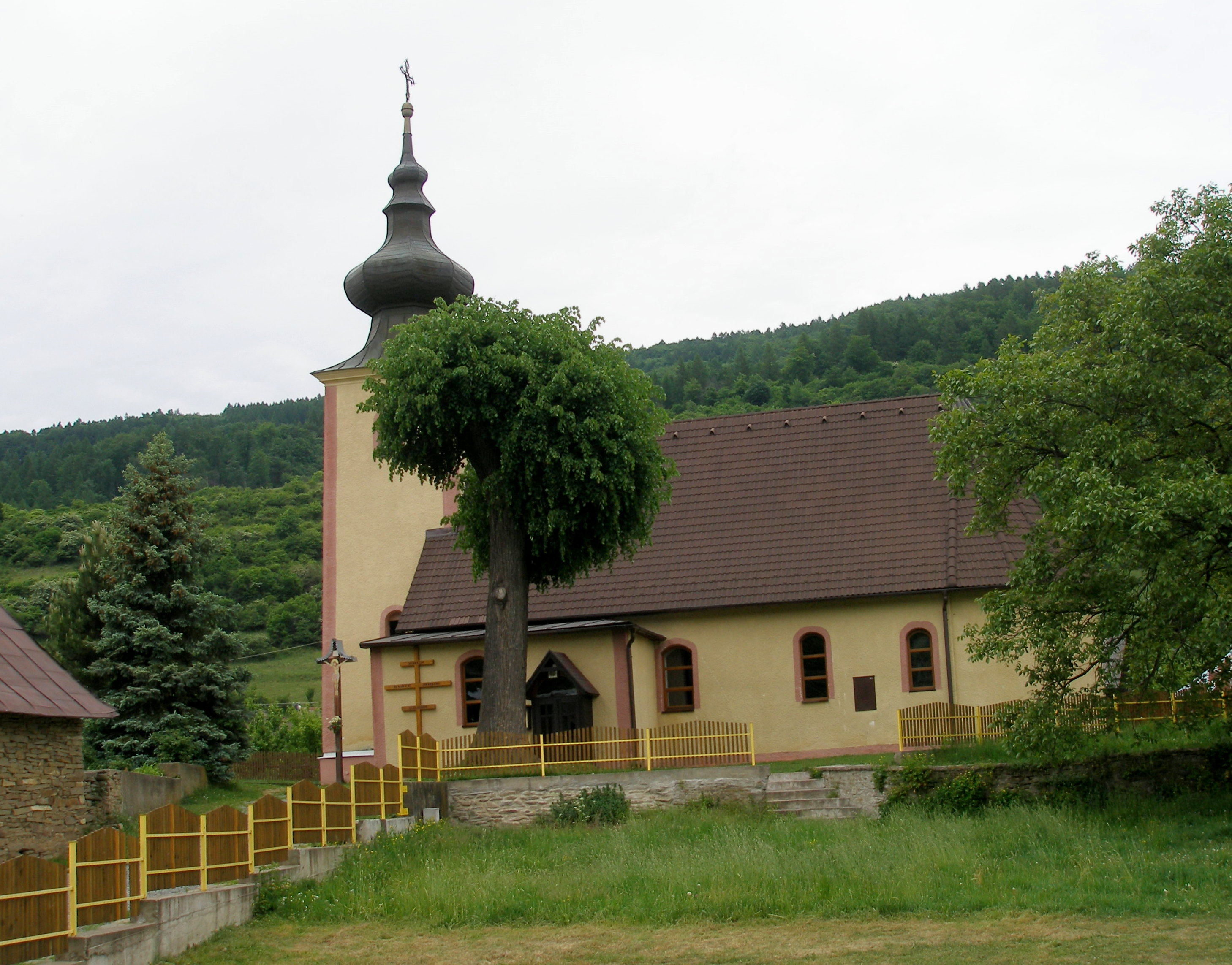

- Flag

- Location of Tichý Potok in the Prešov Region Location of Tichý Potok in Slovakia
- Coordinates: 49.15°N 20.78°E
- Country: Slovakia
- Region: Prešov Region
- District: Sabinov District
- First mentioned: 1427

Area
  - Total: 8.44 km^{2} (3.26 sq mi)
- Elevation: 527 m (1,729 ft)

Population (2025)
  - Total: 329
- Time zone: UTC+1 (CET)
  - Summer (DST): UTC+2 (CEST)
- Postal code: 827 4
- Area code: +421 51
- Vehicle registration plate (until 2022): SB
- Website: www.tichypotok.sk

Tichý Potok (Slovak: Štelbach until 1948; German: Stellbach; Hungarian: Csendespatak, Rusyn: Штельбах / Тихый Потік) is a village and municipality in Sabinov District in the Prešov Region of north-eastern Slovakia.

== History ==
In historical records the village was first mentioned in 1427.

== Geography ==
The municipality lies at an altitude of 527 metres (1,729 ft) and covers an area of 8.44 km^{2} (3.26 sq mi) (2025).

== Population ==
Population statistic (10 years)
Year	1995	2005	2015	2025
Count	417	373	335	329
Difference		−10.55%	−10.18%	−1.79%

Population statistic
Year	2024	2025
Count	331	329
Difference		−0.60%

It has a population of 329 people (31 December 2025).

=== Ethnicity ===
Census 2021 (1+ %)
Ethnicity	Number	Fraction
Slovak	304	92.96%
Rusyn	113	34.55%
Romani	19	5.81%
Not found out	15	4.58%
Total	327	

In year 2021 was 327 people by ethnicity 304 as Slovak, 113 as Rusyn, 19 as Romani, 15 as Not found out, 1 as Ukrainian and 1 as German.

Note on population: The difference values of population numbers in the table "Population statistic" and in the sections "Ethnicity" & "Religion" is caused by the use of various statistical methods.

=== Religion ===
Census 2021 (1+ %)
Religion	Number	Fraction
Greek Catholic Church	241	73.7%
Roman Catholic Church	63	19.27%
None	14	4.28%
Not found out	5	1.53%
Total	327	

In year 2021 was 327 people by religion 241 from Greek Catholic Church, 63 from Roman Catholic Church, 14 from None, 5 from Not found out, 2 from Jehovah's Witnesses, 1 from Other and 1 from Evangelical Church.
