= Máriapócs =

- Town
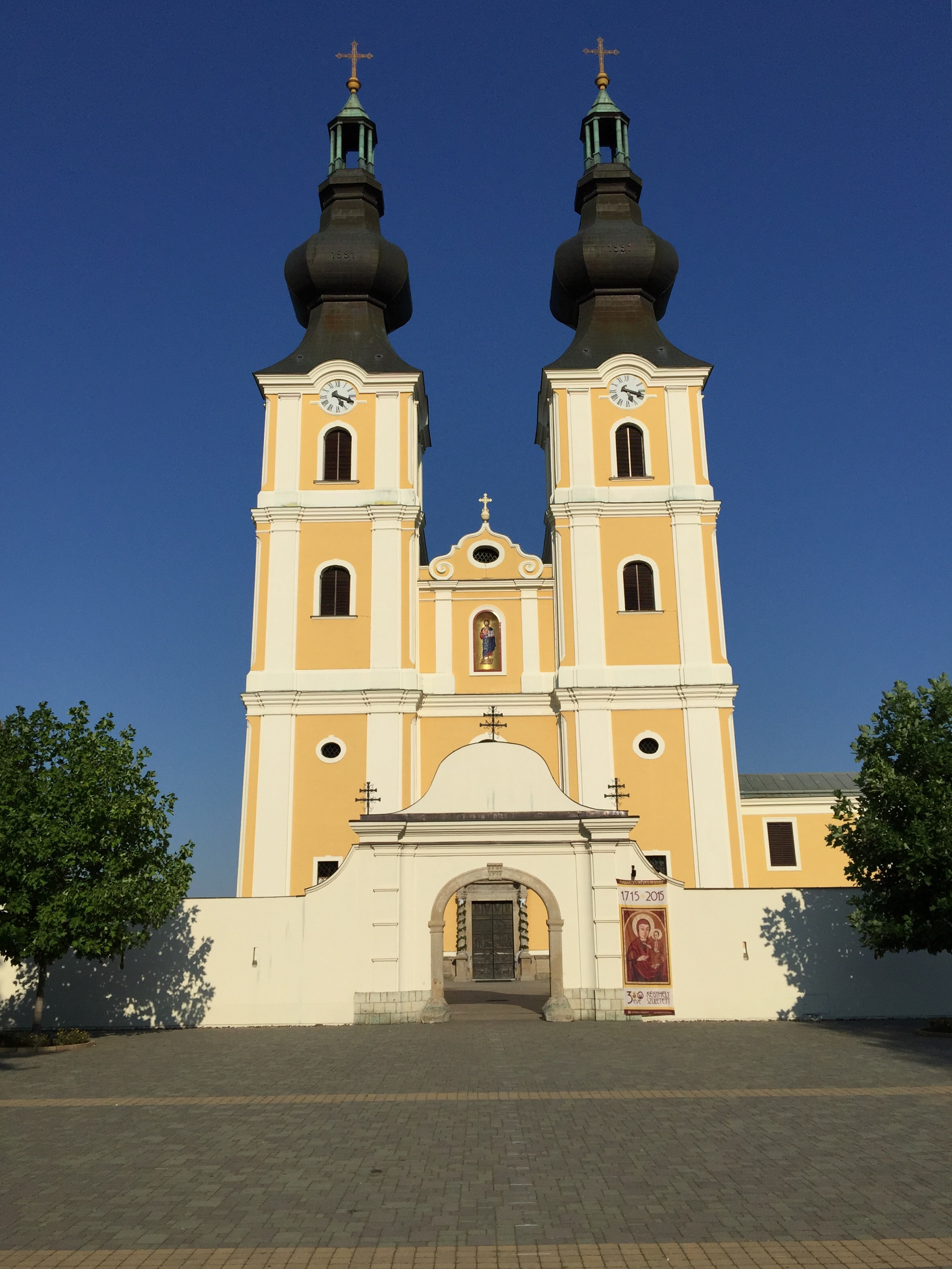
- Church in Máriapócs

- Flag Coat of arms

- Location within Hungary
- Coordinates: 47°53′N 22°02′E
- Country: Hungary
- County: Szabolcs-Szatmár-Bereg

Area
  - Total: 22.09 km^{2} (8.53 sq mi)

Population (2015)
  - Total: 2,153
  - Density: 97.46/km^{2} (252.4/sq mi)
- Time zone: UTC+1 (CET)
  - Summer (DST): UTC+2 (CEST)
- Postal code: 4326
- Area code: 42

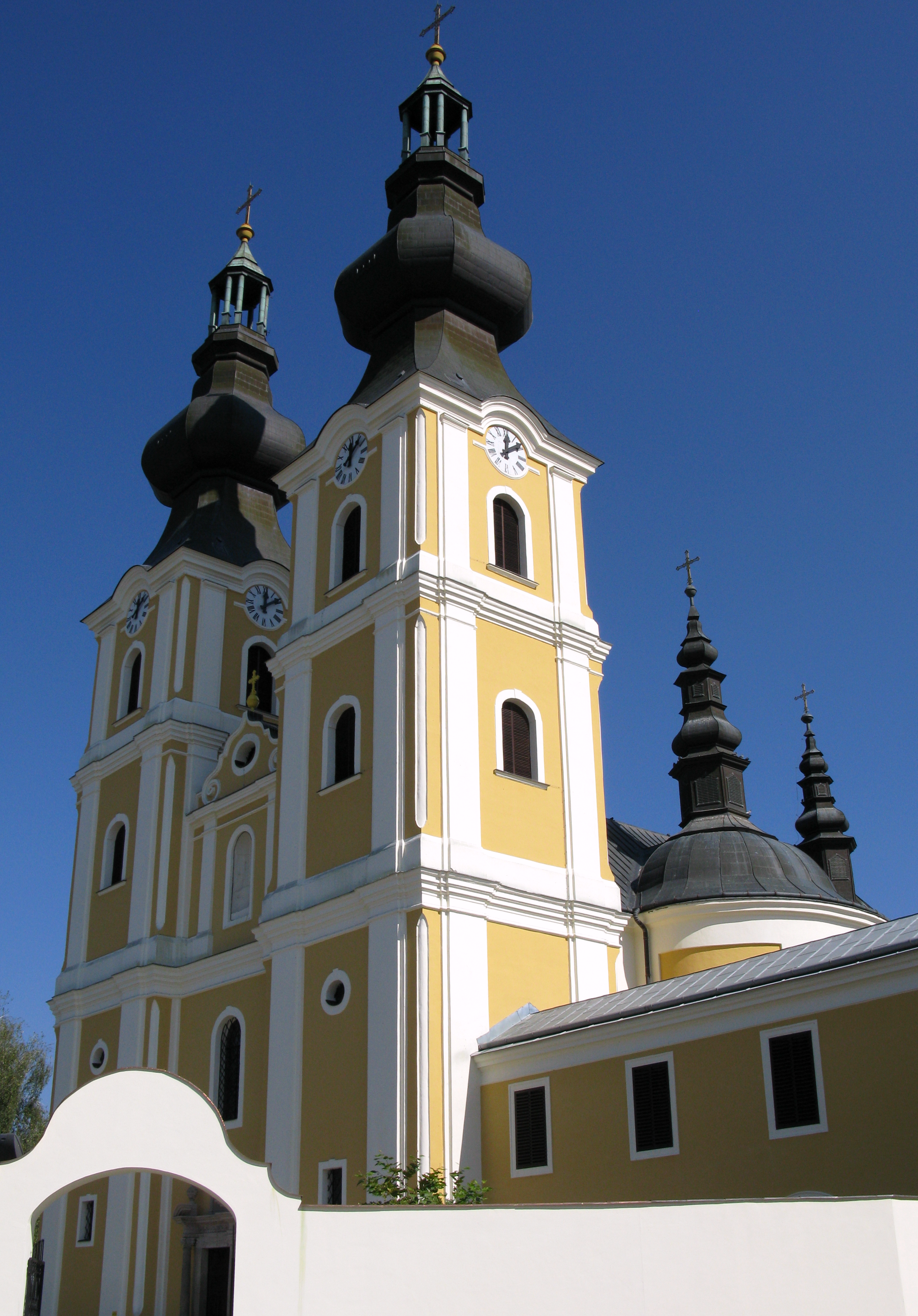
Greek Catholic pilgrimage church, St Michael Archangel in Máriapócs

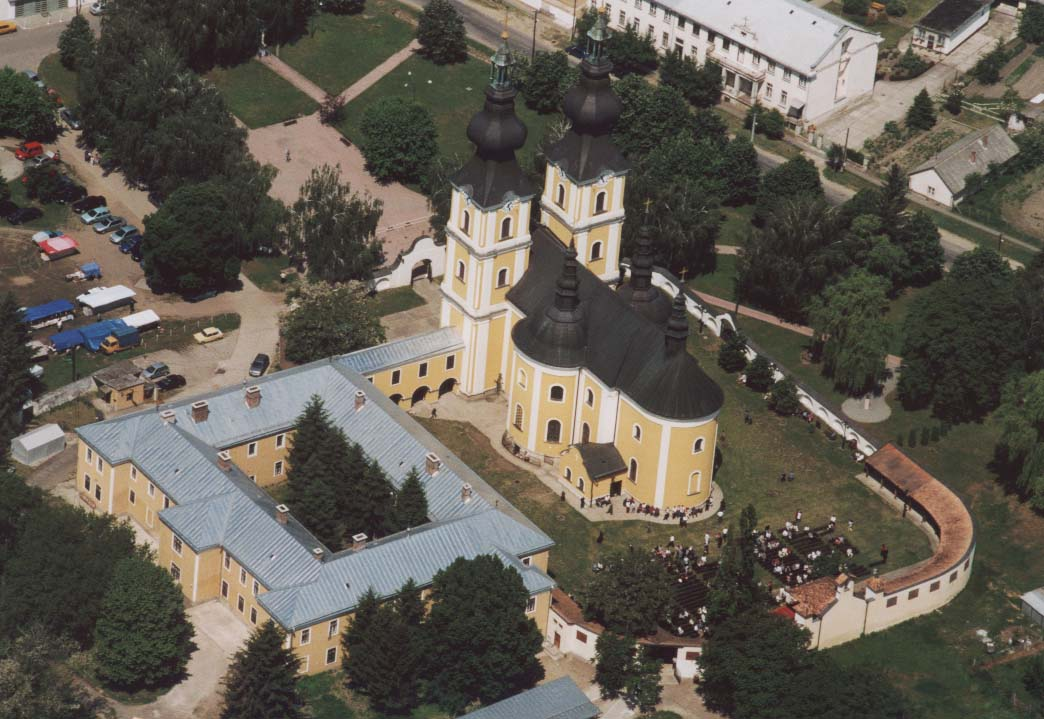
Aerial photography of the church

Máriapócs is a small town in Szabolcs-Szatmár-Bereg county, in the Northern Great Plain region of eastern Hungary. It lies near Nyíregyháza. Saint Michael the Archangel Greek Catholic Church is an important place for pilgrimage, housing a miraculous icon of the Mother of God, which wept twice. This icon is not the original, but an 18th-century copy. The original icon, which wept once, is kept in St. Stephen's Cathedral in Vienna.

== Etymology ==
The "Pócs" in Máriapócs is a derivative of the Hungarian name Pál, meaning the name Paul. The prefix Mária was added in the 18th century in reference to the shrine to the Virgin Mary in the village.

== Demographics ==
As of 2023, the village had a total population of 1888. As of 2022, the town was 91.1% Hungarian, 6.1% Gypsy, 3.1% Rusyn, and 1.8% of non-European origin. The remainder chose not to respond. The population was 44.9% Greek Catholic, and 16.9% Roman Catholic, and 6% Reformed.

== See also ==
- Hungarian Greek Catholic Church
