= Stefan Olshavskyi =

Stefan Simon Olshavskyi
- Eparch of Mukacheve
- Church: Ruthenian Greek Catholic Church
- Diocese: Vicar Apostolic for the Ruthenians in Mukacheve
- Appointed: 26 August 1733
- Term ended: 24 December 1737
- Predecessor: Hennadiy Bizantsiy
- Successor: Havryil Blazhovskyi

Orders
- Ordination: 1719 (Priest) by Hennadiy Bizantsiy
- Consecration: 1735 (Bishop) by Atanasiy Sheptytskyi

Personal details
- Born: Simeon Židik about 1695 Oľšavica
- Died: 24 December 1737 (aged 41–42) Mukachevo

Stefan Simon Olshavskyi, O.S.B.M. (born as Simeon Židik; Ukrainian: Стефан Симон Ольшавський, Hungarian: István Simon Olsavszky, Slovak: Štefan Simeon Olšavský, c. 1695 – 24 December 1737) was the bishop of the Vicariate Apostolic for the Ruthenians in Mukacheve from 1733 to his death in 1737.

== Life ==
Simon Olshavskyi was born on about 1695 in the village of Oľšavica, from which he took his surname (which originally was Židik). He studied philosophy in Košice and then in the Jesuit college of Trnava. At the end of his studies, he was ordained a secular priest in 1719 and assigned to the Vicariate Apostolic of Mukacheve.

At the death of his predecessor, he was appointed, on 26 August 1733 as general vicar by the Latin bishop of Eger (actually at that time, following the Union of Uzhhorod, the eparch of Mukacheve was formally an apostolic vicar of that Latin diocese.). He received the titular see of Pella on 20 May 1735 and was consecrated bishop later in this year by the Metropolitan of Kiev and all Rus', Atanasiy Sheptytskyi in Lviv. A short time before consecration, Simon Olshavskyi entered the Order of Saint Basil the Great and took the religious name of Stefan.

Bishop Stefan Olshavskyi died in Mukachevo on 24 December 1737.

== Notes ==
Catholic Church titles
Preceded by Hennadiy Bizantsiy	Vicar Apostolic for the Ruthenians in Mukacheve; 1733–1737	Succeeded by Havryil Blazhovskyi
