= St. Michael Ukrainian Greek Catholic Church (Chicago) =

Historic Ukrainian Greek Catholic Church in Chicago

St. Michael the Archangel Ukrainian Greek-Catholic Church
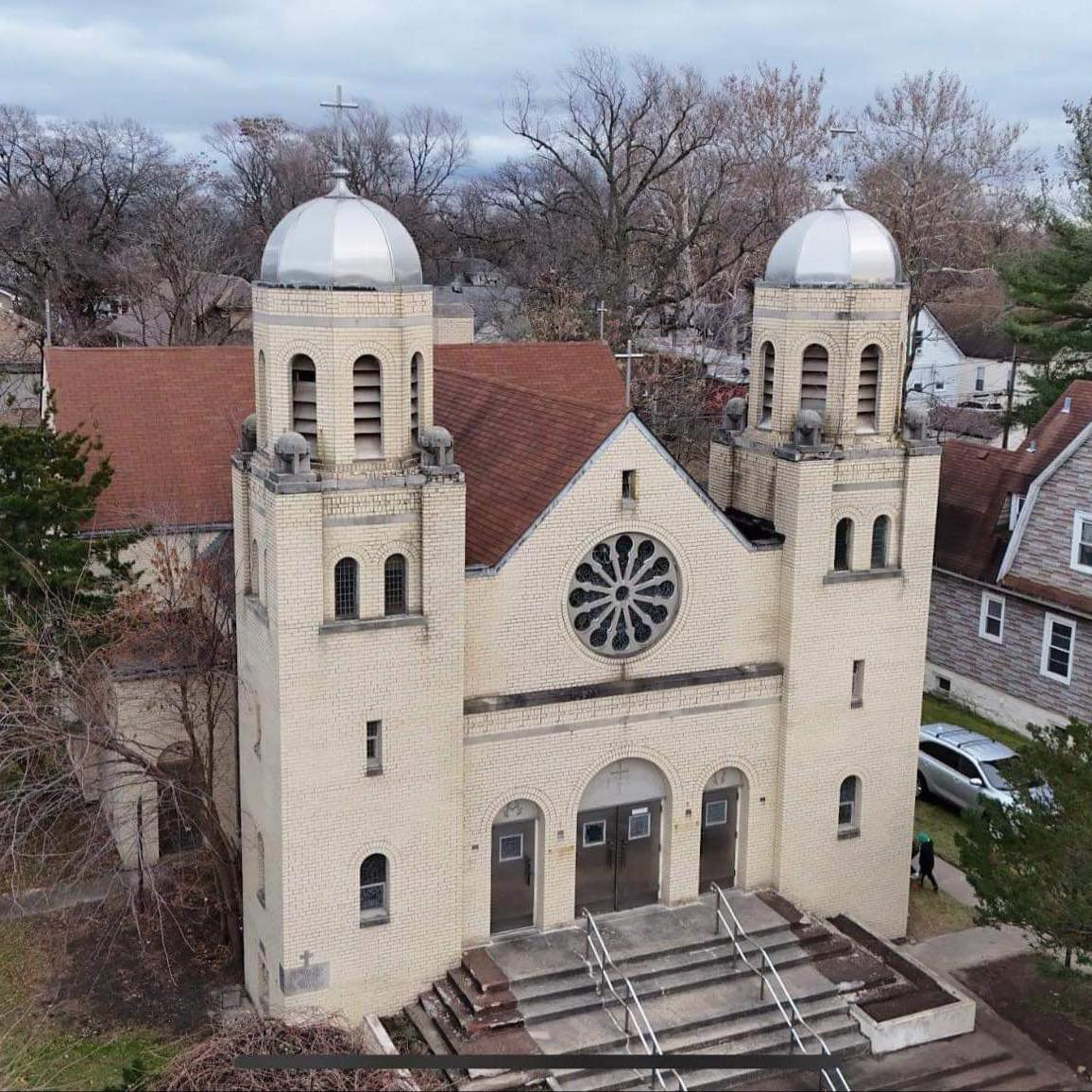
- St. Michael the Archangel Ukrainian Greek-Catholic Church
- 41°40′20″N 87°38′07″W
- Location: 12206 S Parnell Ave, Chicago, Illinois
- Country: USA
- Denomination: Catholic Church
- Sui iuris church: Ukrainian Greek Catholic Church
- Churchmanship: Byzantine Rite

History
- Founder(s): Father Walter Korytowsky and Father Nicholas Strutynsky
- Dedication: Soter Ortynsky
- Dedicated: May 17, 1917

Architecture
- Functional status: Active
- Architectural type: Byzantine
- Completed: 1960
- Construction cost: $250,000

Administration
- Province: Ukrainian Catholic Archeparchy of Philadelphia
- Diocese: Ukrainian Catholic Eparchy of Chicago
- Deanery: Chicago

Clergy
- Archbishop: Borys Gudziak
- Bishop: Venedykt Aleksiychuk

St. Michael the Archangel Ukrainian Catholic Church is a historic Ukrainian Greek Catholic Church church located in West Pullman on the far South Side of Chicago. The parish belongs to the Ukrainian Eparchy of Chicago.

== History ==
On May 17, 1917, the Church was solemnly blessed by Bishop Soter Ortynsky, who was assisted by Frs Walter Korytowsky and Nicholas Strutynsky.

From 1917 to 1920, this Church was served by Frs Korytowsky and Anton Ulanycky. During these years, a branch of the men's Ukrainian National Association under patronage of St. Michael the Archangel and a ladies branch under the patronage of Blessed Virgin Mary were organized.

In 1920 Fr Nicholas Simynowych became pastor of St. Michael Parish. Simynowych, co-established an athletic association called "Sitch", and also a Ukrainian National League for women. Their most important accomplishment was organizing a Ukrainian school.

Simynowych created a local chapter of the Providence Association of Ukrainian Catholics in 1929. His son, Dr. Myroslaw Simynowych, organized a branch of the Ukrainian Red Cross Society, where first head was Mrs. Mary Boros.

From 1936 to 1939, Frs Sylvester Zurawecky and Ambrose Senyshyn OSBM, who would later become Archeparch of Philadelphia, performed the pastoral duties at the parish.

In 1939 the Basilians Fathers took control of St. Michael's Parish. The Basilian Fathers purchased a rectory for $6000 at 12211 South Parnell Avenue.

In 1957, Fr. Ivan Kohut launched a campaign to build a new church. Bishop Joseph Michael Schmondiuk of Stamford dedicated the new Church on 20 November 1960. The church building features stained glass windows and bells imported from Italy. A fresco of the Last Supper by Ukrainian-American painter Mychajlo Dmytrenko adorns the apse.

After Chicago received its own eparchy, the new local bishop, Jaroslav Gabro requested the parish return to diocesan control from the Basilian order.

In 1980, after the closure of the nearby Ukrainian Catholic parish of St. Basil the Great, St. Michael's received its parishioners and adopted the Julian calendar for liturgical services.

== See also ==
- Ukrainian Catholic Eparchy of Chicago
- St. Joseph the Betrothed Ukrainian Greek Catholic Church
- St. Nicholas Cathedral (Chicago)
