= Robert Mikhail Moskal =

Catholic bishop (1937–2022)

His Grace and The Most Reverend Robert Mikhail Moskal
- Eparch Emeritus of Saint Josaphat in Parma
- Native name: Роберт Михайло Москаль
- Church: Ukrainian Greek Catholic Church
- Diocese: Ukrainian Catholic Eparchy of Saint Josaphat in Parma
- Installed: 1984
- Term ended: July 29, 2009
- Predecessor: First Bishop
- Successor: Bohdan Danylo
- Previous posts: Auxiliary Bishop of Ukrainian Catholic Archeparchy of Philadelphia; Titular Bishop of Agathopolis (1981–1983)

Orders
- Ordination: March 25, 1963 by Ambrozij Andrew Senyshyn, O.S.B.M.
- Consecration: October 13, 1981 by Stephen Sulyk, Basil H. Losten and Innocent Lotocky

Personal details
- Born: October 24, 1937 Carnegie, Pennsylvania, U.S.
- Died: August 7, 2022 (aged 84)

Styles of Robert Mikhail Moskal
- Reference style: His Grace; The Most Reverend
- Spoken style: His Grace
- Religious style: Bishop

Robert Mikhail Moskal (Note: Ukrainian: Роберт Михайло Москаль, romanized: Robert Mykhailo Moskal) (October 24, 1937 – August 7, 2022) was a bishop of the Ukrainian Greek Catholic Church in the United States. He served as the first eparch (bishop) of the Ukrainian Catholic Eparchy of Saint Josaphat in Parma from 1984 to 2009.

== Biography ==
Born in Carnegie, Pennsylvania, Moskal was ordained a priest for the Archeparchy of Philadelphia on March 25, 1963, by Archbishop Ambrozij Andrew Senyshyn, O.S.B.M. Pope John Paul II named Moskal as the Titular Bishop of Agathopolis and Auxiliary Bishop of Philadelphia on August 3, 1981. He was ordained a bishop by Archbishop Stephen Sulyk on October 13, 1981. The principal co-consecrators were eparchs Basil Losten of Stamford and Innocent Lotocky, O.S.B.M. of Chicago. Moskal was named the first eparch of Parma on December 5, 1983. He served the eparchy until his resignation was accepted by Pope Benedict XVI on July 29, 2009.

He died on August 7, 2022, at the age of 84.

== See also ==
- Catholic Church hierarchy
- Catholic Church in the United States
- Historical list of the Catholic bishops of the United States
- List of Catholic bishops of the United States
- Lists of patriarchs, archbishops, and bishops

== Episcopal succession ==
Catholic Church titles
Preceded by First Bishop	Bishop of Saint Josaphat in Parma; 1984–2009	Succeeded by Bohdan Danylo
