= Wolodymyr Paska =

Most Reverend Walter Paska
- Auxiliary Bishop of Philadelphia
- Church: Ukrainian Greek Catholic Church
- See: Titular Bishop of Tigillava
- Appointed: January 24, 1992
- In office: March 19, 1992 – November 29, 2000

Orders
- Ordination: June 2, 1947
- Consecration: March 19, 1992 by Stephen Sulyk

Personal details
- Born: November 29, 1923 Elizabeth, New Jersey
- Died: August 16, 2008 (aged 84) Plymouth Meeting, Pennsylvania

Walter Paska (November 29, 1923 – August 16, 2008) was a bishop of the Catholic Church in the United States. He served as the Auxiliary Bishop of Ukrainian Catholic Archeparchy of Philadelphia from 1992 to 2000.

== Early life and education ==
Born in Elizabeth, New Jersey, Wolodymyr Walter Paska was educated at St. Basil College Seminary in Stamford, Connecticut, and St. Charles Seminary in Catonsville, Maryland. He was ordained a priest for the Archeparchy of Philadelphia on June 2, 1947. He went on to earn a master's degree in medieval English literature from Fordham University in 1952 and a doctorate in canon law from The Catholic University of America School of Canon Law in 1975.

== Priesthood ==
Paska had a varied career after ordination to the priesthood. He taught at St. Basil Prep and College. He held pastoral assignments in Brooklyn, New York; Elizabeth, New Jersey; Hempstead, New York; Stamford, Connecticut; Chester, Pennsylvania; Cherry Hill, New Jersey, and Williamstown, New Jersey. Pope Paul VI named Paska a Prelate of Honor, with the title of Monsignor in 1963. He served as the first chancellor and vicar general of the Eparchy of St. Nicholas in Chicago from 1969 to 1971. From 1975 to 1978 he was a professor of canon law at The Catholic University of America School of Canon Law, and from 1979 to 1984 as rector at St. Josaphat Seminary in Washington, D.C. During these years Paska also served the archeparchy as judicial vicar and vocations director.

== Auxiliary Bishop ==
Pope John Paul II named Paska as the Titular Bishop of Tigillava and Auxiliary Bishop of Philadelphia (Ukrainian) on January 24, 1992. He was ordained a bishop by Archbishop Stephen Sulyk on March 19, 1992. The principal co-consecrators were Bishops Innocent Lotocky, O.S.B.M. of Chicago and Basil H. Losten of the Stamford. Paska served as rector of the Cathedral of the Immaculate Conception in Philadelphia from 1992 to 2001. His resignation as auxiliary bishop was accepted on November 29, 2000.

== Later life and death ==
After his resignation was accepted, Paska continued to review canon law cases and acted as the defender of the bond of the metropolitan tribunal. He died from complications of a stroke at AristaCare in Plymouth Meeting, Pennsylvania, on August 16, 2008, at the age of 84. His funeral was celebrated at the Cathedral of the Immaculate Conception and he was buried at Our Lady of Sorrows Cemetery in Langhorne, Pennsylvania.
