= Bohdan Danylo =

Polish-American Catholic bishop

His Grace, The Most Reverend Bohdan John Danylo
- Eparch of Saint Josaphat in Parma
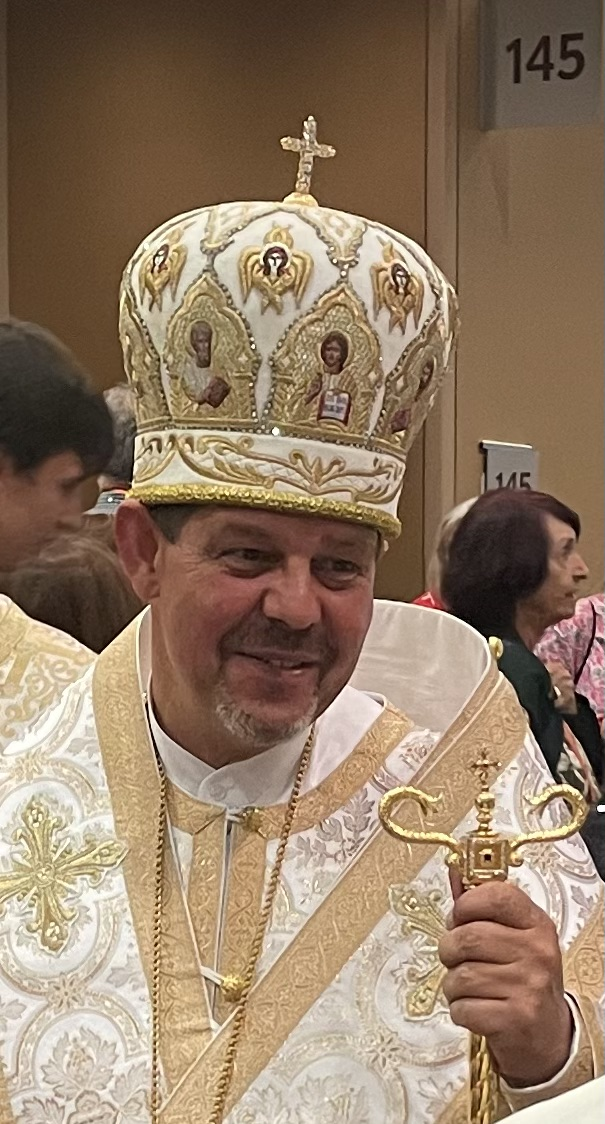
- Church: Ukrainian Greek Catholic Church
- Metropolis: Philadelphia
- Diocese: Parma
- Appointed: August 7, 2014
- Installed: November 4, 2014
- Predecessor: Robert Mikhail Moskal

Orders
- Ordination: October 1, 1996 by Basil H. Losten
- Consecration: November 4, 2014 by Sviatoslav Shevchuk, Paul Chomnycky and John Bura

Personal details
- Born: May 27, 1971 (age 55) Giżycko, Poland

Styles of Bohdan John Danylo
- Reference style: His Grace; The Most Reverend
- Spoken style: His Grace
- Religious style: Bishop

Bohdan John Danylo (born May 22, 1971) is a Polish-born prelate of the Ukrainian Greek Catholic Church in the United States. He has served as Eparch of Saint Josaphat in Parma since 2014.

== Biography ==
Bohdan John Danylo was born in Giżycko, Poland. He began his studies for the priesthood in Poland where he studied philosophy in Lublin. After moving to the United States he completed his theological studies at The Catholic University of America in Washington, D.C.

Danylo was ordained a priest for the Ukrainian Catholic Eparchy of Stamford on October 1, 1996, by Bishop Basil H. Losten. He spent a year at St. Michael's Parish in Hartford, Connecticut before he was named the Vice-Rector of the Seminary of St. Basil's Cathedral in Stamford, Connecticut. He furthered his education at Saint Vladimir's Orthodox Theological Seminary in Crestwood, New York and at the Pontifical University of Saint Thomas Aquinas in Rome where he earned a Licentiate of Sacred Theology.

Pope Francis named Danylo as the second bishop of Saint Josaphat in Parma on August 7, 2014. He was consecrated a bishop by Major Archbishop Sviatoslav Shevchuk of Kyiv-Galicia on November 4, 2014. The principal co-consecrators were auxiliary bishop John Bura of Philadelphia and Bishop Paul Patrick Chomnycky, O.S.B.M. of Stamford.

== See also ==
- Catholic Church hierarchy
- Catholic Church in the United States
- Historical list of the Catholic bishops of the United States
- List of Catholic bishops of the United States
- Lists of patriarchs, archbishops, and bishops

== Episcopal succession ==
Catholic Church titles
Preceded by Robert Mikhail Moskal	Bishop of Saint Josaphat in Parma; 2014-Present	Succeeded by incumbent
