= John Stock (bishop) =

Ukrainian Catholic bishop in the United States

Most Reverend John Stock
- Auxiliary Bishop of Philadelphia
- Church: Ukrainian Greek Catholic Church
- See: Titular Bishop of Pergamum
- Appointed: January 11, 1971
- In office: May 25, 1971 - June 29, 1972

Orders
- Ordination: December 4, 1943
- Consecration: May 25, 1971 by Ambrozij Andrew Senyshyn, O.S.B.M.

Personal details
- Born: July 5, 1918 St. Clair, Pennsylvania
- Died: June 29, 1972 (aged 53)

John Stock (July 5, 1918 – June 29, 1972) was a bishop of the Catholic Church in the United States. He served as the Auxiliary Bishop of Ukrainian Catholic Archeparchy of Philadelphia from 1971 to 1972.

== Biography ==
Born in St. Clair, Pennsylvania, Stock was ordained a priest for the Archeparchy of Philadelphia on December 4, 1943. Pope Paul VI named him as the Titular Bishop of Pergamum and Auxiliary Bishop of Philadelphia (Ukrainian) on January 11, 1971. He was ordained a bishop by Archbishop Ambrozij Andrew Senyshyn, O.S.B.M. on May 25, 1971. The principal co-consecrators were Bishops Jaroslav Gabro of Chicago and Michael Dudick of the Byzantine Catholic Eparchy of Passaic. He died the following year on June 29, 1972, at the age of 53.
