= Cathedral of the Immaculate Conception (Philadelphia) =

Ukrainian Greek Catholic cathedral in the US

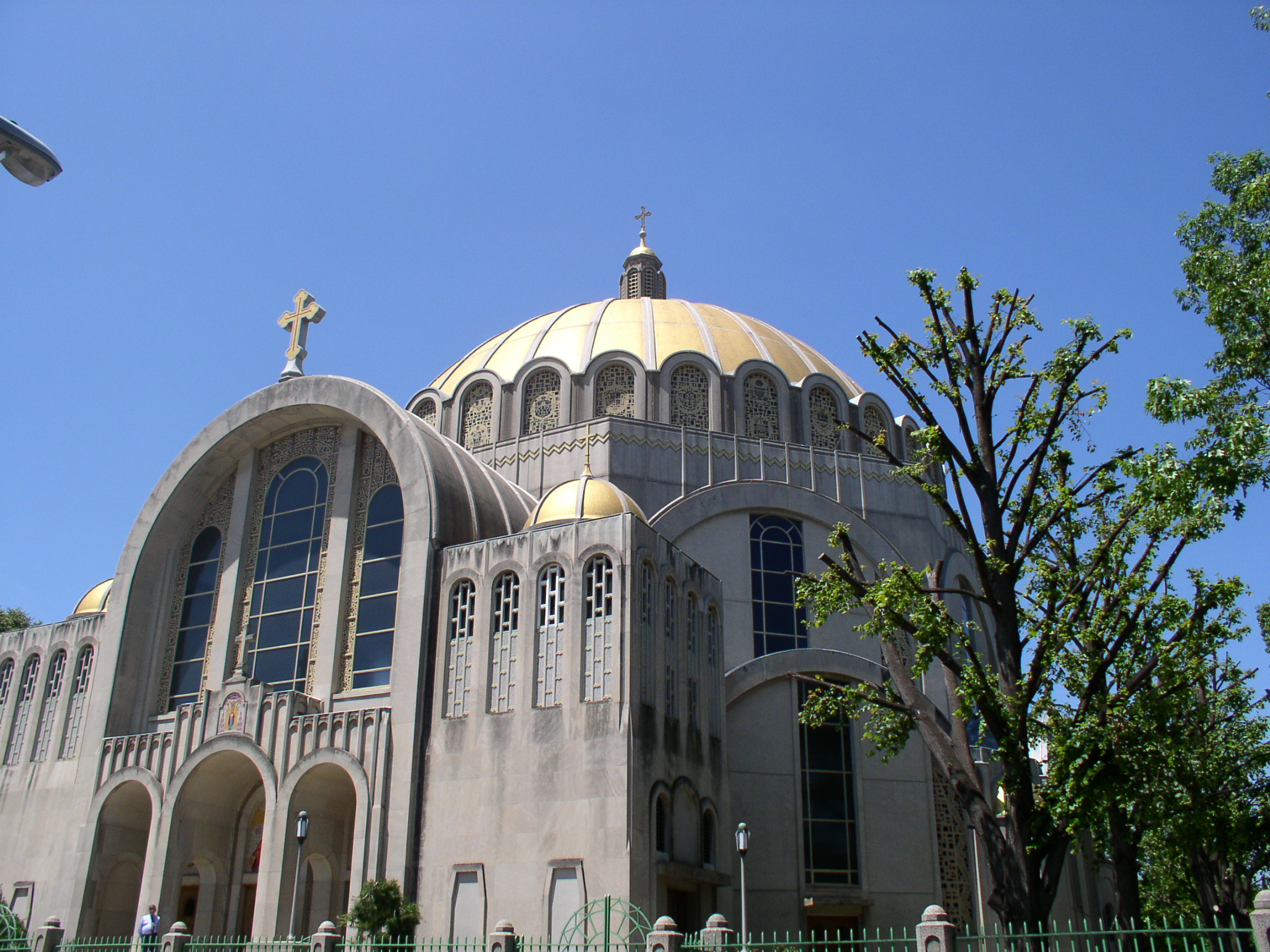

- Location within Pennsylvania Location within the United States
- 39°57′58.95″N 75°9′0.91″W
- Location: 830 N. Franklin St. Philadelphia, Pennsylvania
- Country: United States
- Denomination: Catholic Church
- Sui iuris church: Ukrainian Greek Catholic Church
- Churchmanship: Byzantine Rite
- Website: ukrcathedral.com

History
- Founded: 1886

Architecture
- Architect: Julian K. Jastremsky
- Style: Byzantine Revival
- Completed: 1966

Specifications
- Capacity: 1,810
- Length: 172 feet (52 m)
- Width: 128 feet (39 m)
- Height: 106 feet (32 m)
- Materials: Limestone; Architectural concrete

Administration
- Diocese: Archeparchy of Philadelphia

Clergy
- Bishop: Borys Gudziak
- Rector: Very Rev. Fr. Roman Pitula

Cathedral of the Immaculate Conception is a Ukrainian Greek Catholic cathedral located in the Poplar neighborhood of Philadelphia, Pennsylvania, United States. It is the seat for the Archeparchy of Philadelphia.

== History ==
Ruthenians, who are Catholics belonging to the Ruthenian Greek Catholic Church (an Eastern Catholic church of the Byzantine Rite) and were known as such in the Austro-Hungarian Empire, started immigrating in sizable numbers to the United States in the late 1870s. A Ruthenian priest immigrated in 1884 and blessed their first church building in Shenandoah, Pennsylvania. The earliest immigrants to Philadelphia settled in Northern Liberties between Sixth and Seventh Streets, south of Girard Avenue. They founded Immaculate Conception parish in 1886.

In 1964, as plans were being made to replace the 1907 cathedral, several members of the congregation wanted the new church to be built in the suburbs where they lived. Archbishop Ambrose Senyshyn chose to build on the property where the old church stood hoping that the East Poplar Redevelopment Area would rejuvenate the neighborhood. The cornerstone was laid on October 16, 1966 and it contains a stone from St. Peter's tomb that Pope Paul VI gave to Archbishop Senyshyn. Pope John Paul II visited the cathedral on October 4, 1979.

== Architecture ==
The cathedral was designed by Julian K. Jastremsky in the Byzantine Revival style and loosely inspired by the Hagia Sophia in Istanbul. The cathedral's central dome is covered with 1/4 inch square ( 1.6129 cm^{2} ) Venetian glass tiles made of 22 karat gold fused in the glass. The dome's interior features a mosaic of the Pantocrator. At the base of the dome there are 32 windows. They depict the coat of arms of the regions of Ukraine, the popes, the bishops and the religious orders that contributed to the growth of the Ukrainian Catholic church in the United States.

The mosaic on the sanctuary wall features the Theotokos. Below the Mother of God is a mosaic of the Last Supper. To the right of that mosaic is one depicting the Emmaus from the Gospel of Luke, to the left is a mosaic of the Visitation of the Holy Trinity from the Book of Genesis. The stained glass windows in the sanctuary portray 12 six-winged angels as described in the Book of Isaiah.

The Iconostas was designed by Chrystyna Dochwat. In the middle are the Royal Doors on which there is a depiction of the Annunciation and icons of the Four Evangelists. To the right of the Royal Doors features the icons of Christ the Teacher, St. Stephen the First-Martyr (on the deacon door), and St. John the Baptist. To the left of the Royal Doors portrays icons depicting the Mother of God with the infant Jesus, St. Michael the Archangel (on the deacon door) and St. Nicholas the Wonderworker. Above the Royal Doors is the icon of the Last Supper. At the top of the Iconostas is a depiction of the crucifixion and an icon of Christ the King.

== Crypt ==
Below the cathedral sanctuary is the crypt that contains the remains of Philadelphia's Ukrainian Catholic bishops:

- Bishop Soter Ortynsky, OSBM
- Archbishop Constantine Bohachevsky
- Archbishop Ambrose Senyshyn, OSBM
- Archbishop Stephen Sulyk

== See also ==
- List of Catholic cathedrals in the United States
- List of cathedrals in the United States
