= John Bura =

Catholic bishop in the United States (1944–2023)

His Grace, The Most Reverend John Bura
- Auxiliary Eparch emeritus of Philadelphia
- Church: Ukrainian Greek Catholic Church
- Metropolis: Philadelphia
- Appointed: January 3, 2006
- Installed: February 21, 2006
- Term ended: November 15, 2019
- Other post: Titular Bishop of Limisa
- Previous post: Apostolic Administrator of the Eparchy of Saint Josaphat in Parma (2009–2014)

Orders
- Ordination: February 14, 1971 by Ambrozij Andrew Senyshyn, O.S.B.M.
- Consecration: February 21, 2006 by Lubomyr Husar, Stephen Soroka and Michael Kuchmiak

Personal details
- Born: June 12, 1944 Wegeleben, Gau Magdeburg-Anhalt, Germany
- Died: January 17, 2023 (aged 78) Washington, D.C., U.S.

Styles of John Bura
- Reference style: His Grace; The Most Reverend
- Spoken style: His Grace
- Religious style: Bishop

John Bura (Ukrainian: Іван Бура; June 12, 1944 – January 17, 2023) was a bishop of the Ukrainian Greek Catholic Church in the United States. He served as the Auxiliary Bishop of Ukrainian Catholic Archeparchy of Philadelphia from 2006 to 2019. From 2009 to 2014 he served as the Apostolic Administrator of the Eparchy of Saint Josaphat in Parma.

== Biography ==
Born in Wegeleben, Germany, Bura's family emigrated to Jersey City, New Jersey in 1950. He was educated at St. Basil Minor Seminary in Stamford, Connecticut and The Catholic University of America in Washington, D.C. He was ordained a priest for the Archeparchy of Philadelphia on February 14, 1971 by Archbishop Ambrozij Andrew Senyshyn, O.S.B.M. As a priest his assignments included being a teacher and Vice-Rector of St. Basil Minor Seminary, Rector of St. Josaphat Seminary in Washington, D.C., pastor of Holy Ghost Church in Chester, Pennsylvania and St. Nicholas Church in Wilmington, Delaware. Pope Benedict XVI named Bura as the Titular Bishop of Limisa and Auxiliary Bishop of Philadelphia on January 3, 2006. He was ordained a bishop by Cardinal Lubomyr Husar, the Major Archbishop of Kyiv-Galicia on February 21, 2006. The principal co-consecrators were Archbishop Stephen Soroka of Philadelphia and Bishop Michael Kuchmiak, C.Ss.R. of Great Britain. Bura was named the Apostolic Administrator of the Eparchy of Saint Josaphat in Parma on July 29, 2009, and served in that capacity until 2014.

Pope Francis accepted his resignation on November 15, 2019.

Bura died on January 17, 2023, at the age of 78.

Catholic Church titles
Preceded by -	Ukrainian Catholic Auxiliary Bishop of Philadelphia; 2006–2019	Succeeded by -
