= St. Joseph the Betrothed Ukrainian Greek Catholic Church =

St. Joseph the Betrothed Ukrainian Greek Catholic Parish
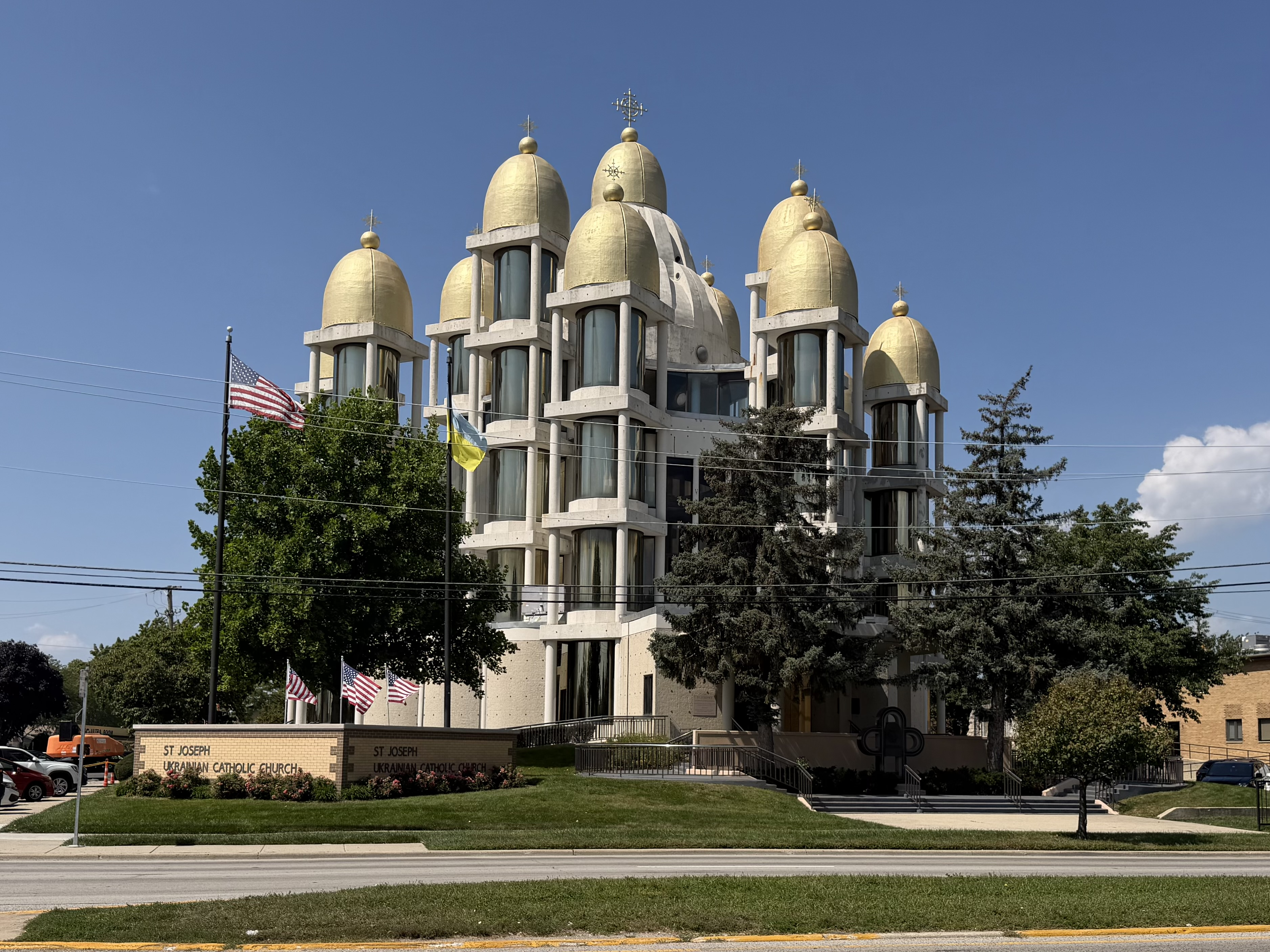
- St. Joseph the Betrothed Ukrainian Greek-Catholic Church in 2026
- St. Joseph the Betrothed Ukrainian Greek Catholic Parish
- 41°58′14″N 87°50′14″W
- Location: 5000 N. Cumberland, Chicago, Illinois
- Country: USA
- Denomination: Catholic Church
- Churchmanship: Byzantine Ukrainian Greek Catholic
- Website: stjosephukr.com

History
- Founded: August 1956
- Founder: Joseph Shary
- Dedication: Bishop Jaroslaw Gabro

Architecture
- Functional status: Active
- Heritage designation: Ukrainian
- Architect: Zenon Mazurkevich
- Architectural type: Ultra-Modern
- Groundbreaking: 1975
- Completed: 1977
- Construction cost: $1,750,000

Administration
- Province: Ukrainian Catholic Archeparchy of Philadelphia
- Diocese: Ukrainian Catholic Eparchy of Chicago
- Deanery: Chicago

Clergy
- Archbishop: Stephen Soroka
- Bishop: Richard Seminack
- Priest: Volodymyr Kushnir
- Pastor: Mykola Buryadnyk

St. Joseph the Betrothed Ukrainian Greek-Catholic Church is a Ukrainian church located in Chicago and belonging to the St. Nicholas Eparchy for the Ukrainian Catholics. The building has an ultra-modern roof, comprising thirteen gold domes which symbolize the twelve apostles and Jesus Christ as the largest center dome.

== Church building ==
=== Interior ===
The interior of the church is adorned with Byzantine style icons (frescoes).

Relief geometric patterns of crosses are etched into the walls of the second story of the current structure. The underlying materials from which the crosses were made was left visible until in 1996 and 1997 pastor Fr. Pavlo Hayda had them painted, and the gold domes restored. The iconostasis inside the church is a traditional Byzantine iconostasis with two tiers and is in the Modern Cossack Baroque Style.

In the rear, on the west end of the altar server and priest sacristy, is the diminutive St. Paraskevia Chapel, named after the saint from whom Fr. Shary's (see History) mother took her name. Daily morning services take place here, and the main sanctuary is used for celebrating Divine Liturgies on Saturdays, Sundays, and high holy days. The iconostasis in the chapel is the original for the church on this site.

=== Grotto ===
Across the way from the church is a grotto Shrine dedicated to Our Lady of Hoshiv with an altar sometimes used for outdoor services (such as Pascha Blessing). In 2006, Fr. Pavlo's wife, Christine, led a restoration and relandscaping of the grotto into a memorial garden, which is now dedicated to deceased parishioners.

== History ==
In August 1956, Archbishop Constantine Bohachevsky appointed Fr. Joseph Shary to organize a new community. The first two Liturgies were celebrated at St. Patrick's High School Auditorium, with the first church being built at its current location. This building stands north of the current church building and is used as a Parish Life Center that houses offices, classrooms, and a hall. It is also home to the Selfreliance Ukrainian American Federal Credit Union's northwest branch.

As the community expanded, Fr. Shary realized the parish needed a larger facility. He saw this as an opportunity to build what he termed a church for "The Glory of God and Future Generations." The church, designed by architect Zenon Mazurkevich of Philadelphia and constructed by Walter Bratkiv of REM Builders, Inc., was dedicated and consecrated by Bishop Jaroslav Gabro on May 22, 1977.

== Milestones ==
The history of St. Joseph begins with Bishop Constantine Bohachevsky, Metropolitan of the Ukrainian Archeparchy of Philadelphia officially establishing St. Joseph Ukrainian Catholic Church on August 1, 1956. Father Joseph Shary was sent here as the organizing pastor, who upon his arrival in Chicago was met with an energetic group of Ukrainian Catholics anxious to expand the Chicago Ukrainian religious community into the Northwest Side.

=== Timeline ===
On August 21, 1956, Cardinal Samuel Stritch, permitted the parish to use St. Patrick's Christian Brothers High School facilities on Belmont Avenue, until the newly formed parish was financially in a position to purchase land to build a church. Stritch promised all possible assistance in this endeavor.

In 1958, building began on Cumberland Avenue. The upper portion became the church, with the addition of pews, altars and other appropriate furnishings, which were gifts from Immaculate Heart of Mary Parish.

The lower hall became the hub of cultural, social and fund-raising functions, such as parish praznyks, sviachenes, bake sales, choir rehearsals, rummage sales, children's programs, Ukrainian dance lessons, dances, and countless other activities.

On October 1, 1975, construction of the new church edifice began.

On May 22, 1977, Bishop Jaroslav Gabro dedicated the church.

The large rock near the entrance ramp attracted attention to the church. It is a piece of the Canadian Shield brought to the new church's building site. It was retrieved by the contractors during excavation of the foundation. The pastor saved it and had it placed in its present position after construction was completed in 1976.

In 1988, a hand-carved iconostasis, designed in the Byzantine-Ukrainian tradition by Borys Makarenko, was installed in the church.

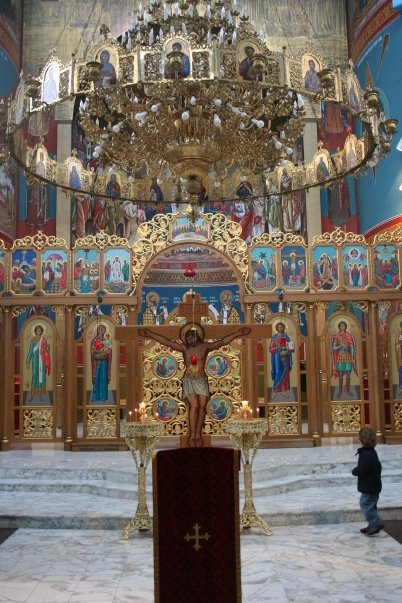
The interior of the new church next to the original one.

The Altar Rosary Society (ARS) has promoted various Ukrainian cultural and social activities, bringing the various components of the society together. When the church was erected, the Altar Rosary Society covered the cost of the installation of the marble floor and apsidial wall. They also sponsored the royal throne, the altars, and the tabernacle. Additionally they provided and maintained the altar linens and many of the vestments. To raise this money, the Altar Rosary Society sponsored fashion shows, bake sales, yearly pascha sale, turkey raffles, bazaars, white-elephant sales, family picnics. Additionally, the members staffed the kitchen, and equipped the church hall kitchen for dinners, picnics, carnivals, breakfasts and other activities.

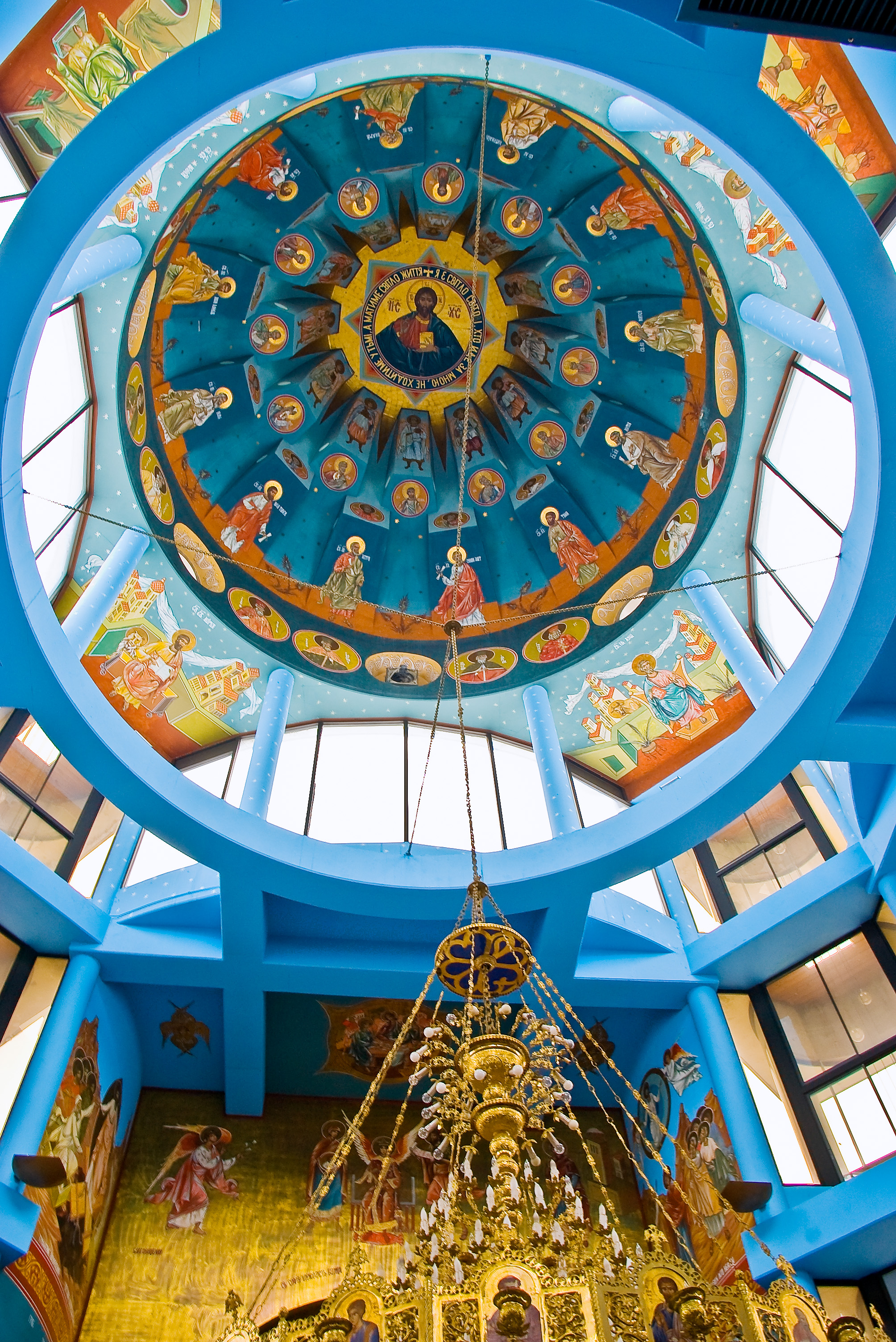
The main dome of the church depicting Christ on the dome representing him.

St. Joseph Church Choir was established in August 1956.

For one and a half years, the choir was trained and directed by Father Shary. Julian Pozniak, a qualified and trained cantor and experienced choir director, remained the sole director and cantor for St. Joseph’s until his retirement. Jaroslav Stefaniuk, with Julian Pozniak's guidance, became choir director and cantor, until his death in March 2006.

Each Sunday the choir sang Divine Liturgy, caroled at Christmas time, and sang at various functions and events throughout the year. Performances took place for the Ukrainian community, but at religious and secular venues, such as the Museum of Science and Industry.

St. Joseph's choir joined with the St. Nicholas Cathedral Slavuta choir to become known as the Metropolitan Andrej Sheptytsky Choir of Chicago. The choir recorded an album of a newly commissioned composition of the Divine Liturgy, by Andrij Hnatyshyn. One of the most momentous performances by the choir was for the visit of Pope John Paul II in Grant Park, in 1979.

The Acres of Fun Festivals, and the Friday night Bingos, along with the Pyrohy sales were major fundraisers for the parish, due in large part to the parish volunteers.

Many young parishioners were in the Sts. Cyril and Methodious Youth Group, were altar servers, orboth. They volunteered at parish events, as well as participating in liturgical services. They volunteered in soup kitchens, participated in retreats and organized citywide youth nights.

== Priests over the years ==
Many of the presiding priests were assigned to St. Joseph Parish while only in their twenties. The first pastor was Fr. Joseph Shary, after whom the parish is named, along with St. Josaphat in Munster, Indiana.

=== Pastors ===
- Rev. Joseph Shary 1956-1982
- Msgr. William Bilinsky 1982-1983
- Rev. Andriy Chirovsky 1983-1985
- Rev. Mykhajlo Kuzma 1985-1987
- Msgr. William Bilinsky 1987-1995
- Rev. Pavlo Hayda 1995-2007
- Rev. Mykola Buryadnyk 2008–Present

=== Current priests ===
Fr. Mykola Buryadnyk (2009–Present) - Pastor Fr. Mykola Buryadnyk was assigned as pastor of St. Joseph parish in February 2008. Since he came to the parish, he helped establish and revitalize several parish organizations such as the Ukrainian Language Bible study Group, the martial arts school of Combat Hopak, the Vyshyvanka School of Dance, and the Homin Theater Group. Fr. Mykola, along with his pastoral ministry, also led the church's roof repairs and gold leaf reapplication the church's interior.

== Gallery ==
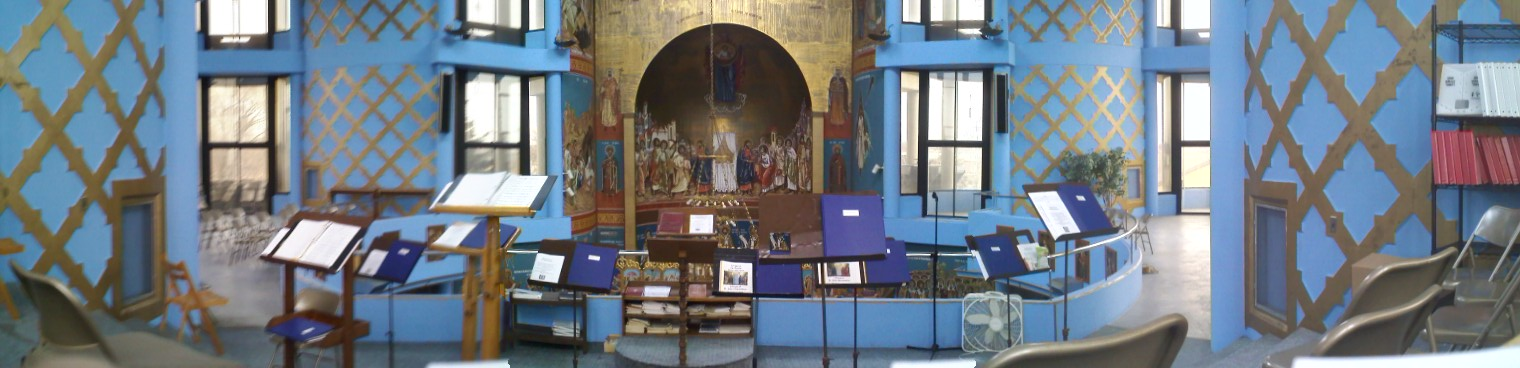
View from the Choir Loft

St. Paraskevia Chapel Located behind the Apse of the main church

Ceiling of the church from the altar showing the dome

Iconostasis detail depicting the Theotokos.

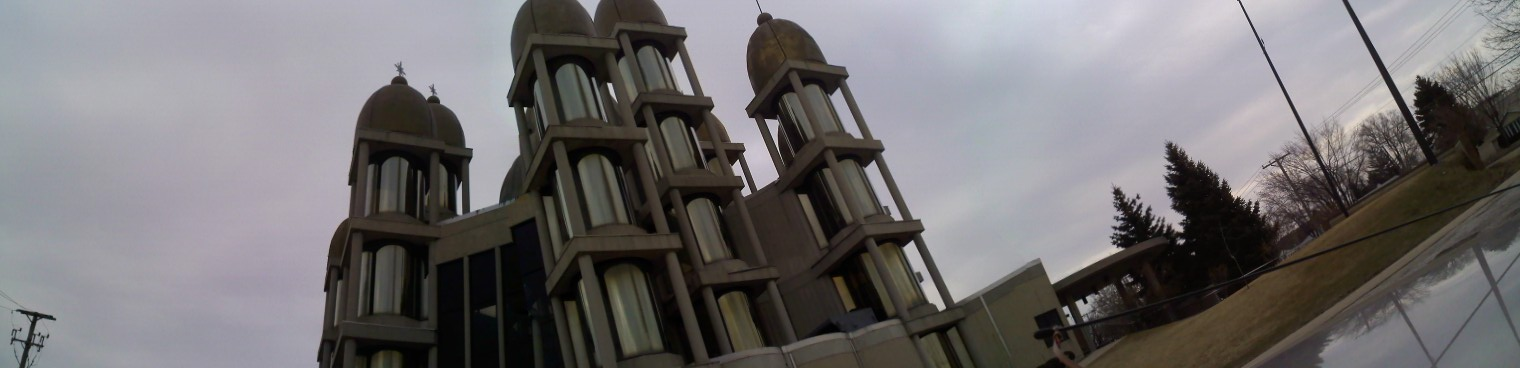
Thirteen domes representing the twelve Disciples and Christ Pantocrator
