= Augustine Hornyak =

Ukrainian Catholic bishop

Augustine Eugene Hornyak OSBM
- Apostolic Exarch of Great Britain
- Church: Ukrainian Greek Catholic Church
- See: Apostolic Exarchate of Great Britain
- In office: 18 April 1963 – 29 September 1987
- Predecessor: William Godfrey
- Successor: Michael Kuchmiak
- Other post: Titular Eparch of Hermonthis (1961-2003)
- Previous post: Auxiliary Bishop of the Apostolic Exarchate of England and Wales (1961-1963)

Orders
- Ordination: 25 March 1945 by Ivan Buchko
- Consecration: 26 October 1961 by Ambrose Senyshyn

Personal details
- Born: 7 October 1919 Kucura, Banat, Bačka and Baranja, Kingdom of Serbs, Croats and Slovenes
- Died: 16 November 2003 (aged 84) London, United Kingdom

Augustine Eugene Hornyak, OSBM (7 October 1919 – 16 November 2003) was the first Apostolic Exarch of the Apostolic Exarchate for Ukrainians in Great Britain. He was one of the few English and Ukrainian bishops to attend the Second Vatican Council.

== Early life ==
Augustine Hornyak was born on 7 October 1919 in Kucura, Voivodina in the Kingdom of Yugoslavia. In 1940, Bishop Dionisije Njaradi persuaded Hornyak to train for the priesthood and, in 1940, Hornyak was sent by the bishop to study in Rome, at the Pontifical Ruthenian College of St. Josaphat's.

== Priesthood ==
Hornyak was ordained as a priest by Bishop Ivan Buchko on 25 March 1945. Because Hornyak was unable to return to Yugoslavia, he continued his studies at Propaganda Fide University, obtaining postgraduate degrees in Canon Law and Theology.

Following advice from Bishop Narjadi and Daniel Ivancho, he served the Ruthenian Eparchy of Pittsburgh as a priest and as professor of Canon Law and Sacred Theology.

In 1956, Hornyak entered the Order of St Basil the Great. He made his Solemn Profession of Monastic Vows in 1960.

He died on 16 November 2003 in London, but was buried in his place of birth, Kucura, now in Serbia.

== See also ==
- Ukrainian Greek Catholic Church

New office	Apostolic Exarch for Ukrainians in Great Britain; 1963–1987	Succeeded by Michael Kuchmiak (Ap. Administrator)
