= St. Vladimir's Cathedral (Stamford, Connecticut) =

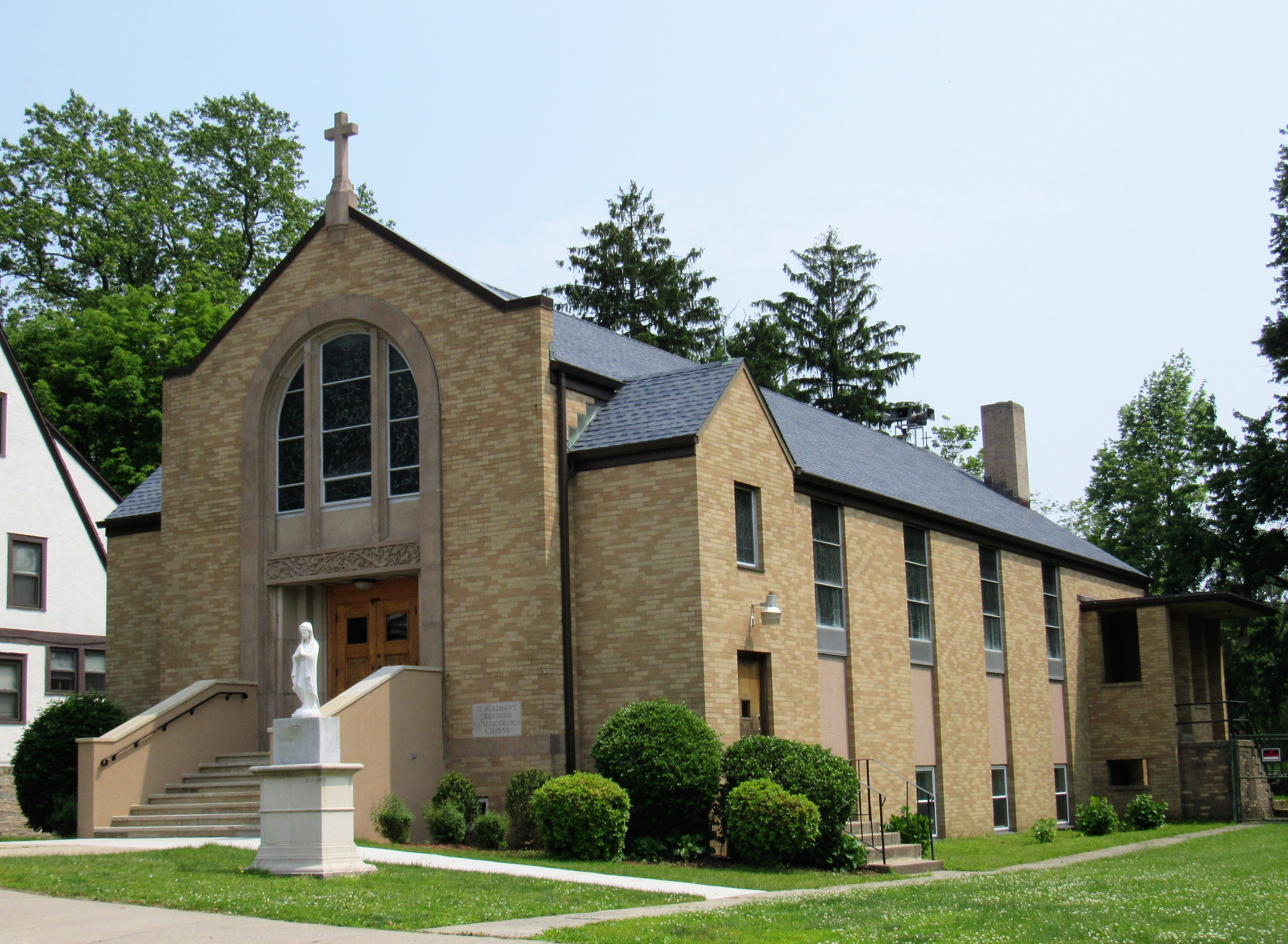
- St. Vladimir's Cathedral
- 41°03′41.93″N 73°31′39.82″W
- Location: 24 Wenzel Terrace; Stamford, Connecticut
- Country: United States
- Denomination: Ukrainian Greek Catholic Church

Architecture
- Style: Romanesque Revival
- Completed: 1957

Administration
- Diocese: Eparchy of Stamford

Clergy
- Bishop(s): Most Rev. Paul Patrick Chomnycky, O.S.B.M.
- Rector: Very Rev. Mitred Archpriest Ihor Midzak

St. Vladimir's Cathedral is a Ukrainian Catholic cathedral located in Stamford, Connecticut. It is the seat for the Eparchy of Stamford. The parish was established in 1916, and the simple brick Romanesque Revival-inspired church building was completed in 1957.

== See also ==
- List of Catholic cathedrals in the United States
- List of cathedrals in the United States
