= Stephen Sulyk =

American bishop (1924–2020)

His Grace, The Most Reverend Stephen Sulyk
- Archeparch of the Archeparchy of Philadelphia
- Church: Ukrainian Greek Catholic Church
- Diocese: Ukrainian Catholic Archeparchy of Philadelphia
- Installed: March 1, 1981
- Term ended: November 29, 2000
- Predecessor: Myroslav Ivan Lubachivsky
- Successor: Stefan Soroka

Orders
- Ordination: June 14, 1952 by Constantine Bohachevsky
- Consecration: March 1, 1981 by Josyf Slipyj, Basil H. Losten, and Neil Savaryn

Personal details
- Born: October 2, 1924 Balnica, Second Polish Republic
- Died: April 6, 2020 (aged 95) Voorhees Township, New Jersey, U.S.

Styles of Stephen Sulyk
- Reference style: His Grace; The Most Reverend
- Spoken style: His Grace
- Religious style: Archbishop

Ordination history of Stephen Sulyk
History
Episcopal consecration
- Consecrated by: Josyf Slipyj
Episcopal succession
Bishops consecrated by Stephen Sulyk as principal consecrator
- Robert Mikhail Moskal: October 13, 1981
- Michael Kuchmiak, C.Ss.R.: April 27, 1988
- Wolodymyr Paska: March 19, 1992
- Michael Wiwchar, C.Ss.R.: September 28, 1993

Stephen Sulyk (Ukrainian: Стефа́н Су́лик; October 2, 1924 – April 6, 2020) was a Ukrainian-American hierarch who was an archbishop of the Ukrainian Greek Catholic Church. He died from complications brought on by COVID-19 during the COVID-19 pandemic.

== Biography ==
Sulyk was born in the Ukrainian village of Balnica, Poland. On March 1, 1981, Sulyk was appointed Archbishop of Philadelphia. On February 27, 2001, he was succeeded by Stefan Soroka as Archbishop of Philadelphia.

On April 5, 2020, Sulyk was taken to hospital due to COVID-19 where he died in April 2020, at the age of 95.

== See also ==
- Catholic Church hierarchy
- Catholic Church in the United States
- Historical list of the Catholic bishops of the United States
- List of Catholic bishops of the United States
- Lists of patriarchs, archbishops, and bishops

== Notes ==
Catholic Church titles
Preceded by Myroslav Ivan Lubachivsky	Archbishop of Philadelphia; 1980—2000	Succeeded by Stefan Soroka
