= Andriy Rabiy =

His Grace, The Most Reverend Andriy Rabiy
- Auxiliary Eparch of Winnipeg; Titular Bishop of Germaniciana
- Archdiocese: Ukrainian Catholic Archeparchy of Winnipeg
- Appointed: November 10, 2022
- Installed: December 30, 2022
- Other post: Titular Bishop of Germaniciana
- Previous post: Auxiliary Eparch of Philadelphia (2017-2022)

Orders
- Ordination: December 19, 2001 by Stefan Soroka
- Consecration: September 3, 2017 by Sviatoslav Shevchuk, Stefan Soroka, and David Motiuk

Personal details
- Born: October 1, 1975 (age 51) Lviv, Ukraine
- Motto: законъ твoй поучeнїє моє

Styles of Andriy Rabiy
- Reference style: His Grace; The Most Reverend
- Spoken style: His Grace
- Religious style: Bishop

Andriy Rabiy (born October 1, 1975) is an American bishop of the Ukrainian Greek Catholic Church and serves as auxiliary bishop for the Ukrainian Catholic Archeparchy of Winnipeg.

== Biography ==
On December 19, 2001, Rabiy was ordained to the priesthood. Pope Francis appointed Rabiy auxiliary bishop for the Ukrainian Catholic Archeparchy of Philadelphia on August 8, 2017. On September 3, 2017, Rabiy was consecrated as a bishop. On September 24, 2017, Rabiy was installed as auxiliary bishop. On April 16, 2018, Rabiy was named Apostolic Administrator of Philadelphia when Archeparch Stefan Soroka's resignation was accepted by Pope Francis.

On November 10, 2022, Pope Francis appointed Rabiy as auxiliary bishop for the Ukrainian Catholic Archeparchy of Winnipeg. His welcoming occurred on December 30, 2022.

== See also ==
- Catholic Church hierarchy
- Catholic Church in the United States
- Historical list of the Catholic bishops of the United States
- List of Catholic bishops of the United States
- Lists of patriarchs, archbishops, and bishops

== Episcopal succession ==
Catholic Church titles
Preceded by -	Ukrainian Catholic Auxiliary Bishop of Winnipeg; 2023-Present	Succeeded by -
Preceded by -	Ukrainian Catholic Auxiliary Bishop of Philadelphia; 2017-2022	Succeeded by -
