= Eparchy of Parma =

Eparchy of Parma may refer to:

- Ruthenian Catholic Eparchy of Parma
- Ukrainian Catholic Eparchy of Saint Josaphat in Parma
