= Myroslav Ivan Lubachivsky =

Head of the Ukrainian Greek Catholic Church from 1984 to 2000

His Eminent Beatitude Myroslav Ivan Lubachivsky
- Cardinal, Major Archbishop of Lviv
- Church: Ukrainian Greek Catholic Church
- Elected: 7 September 1984
- Term ended: 14 December 2000
- Predecessor: Cardinal Josyf Slipyj
- Successor: Cardinal Lubomyr Husar

Orders
- Ordination: 21 September 1938 by Andrey Sheptytsky
- Consecration: 12 Nov 1978 by John Paul II
- Created cardinal: 25 May 1985 by John Paul II

Personal details
- Born: 24 June 1914 Dolyna, Kingdom of Galicia and Lodomeria, Austria-Hungary
- Died: 14 December 2000 (aged 86) Lviv, Ukraine
- Buried: St. George's Cathedral, Lviv; 49°50′19.48″N 24°0′46.19″E
- Coat of arms: Myroslav Ivan Lubachivsky's coat of arms

Styles of Myroslav Ivan Lubachivsky
- Reference style: His Eminence
- Spoken style: Your Eminence
- Informal style: Cardinal
- See: Lviv

Myroslav Ivan Lubachivsky (Ukrainian: Мирослав Іван Любачівський; 24 June 1914 – 14 December 2000), cardinal, was bishop of the Ukrainian Catholic Archeparchy of Philadelphia in the United States and from 1984 major archbishop of Lviv and head of the Ukrainian Greek Catholic Church (UGCC).

== Life ==
He was ordained a priest of the Archeparchy of Lviv in 1938 by Metropolitan Andrey Sheptytsky. He then continued his doctoral studies in theology in Austria. After World War II, he was unable to return to Ukraine and emigrated to the United States, where he continued his pastoral work, first as a priest at St. Peter and Paul Church in Cleveland, Ohio for almost 20 years, and then from 1968 as a teacher of languages at the St. Josaphat Ukrainian Catholic Seminary in Washington, St. Basil's College in Philadelphia and Saint Basil Academy (Jenkintown, Pennsylvania) before being consecrated archbishop of Philadelphia in 1979.

The Ukrainian Holy Synod elected Lubachivsky coadjutor to Cardinal Josyf Slipyj in 1979. Upon Cardinal Slipyj's death in 1984, he took over as head of the UGCC. In 1985, Pope John Paul II gave him the title of Cardinal Priest of S. Sofia a Via Boccea.

Soviet authorities lifted the ban against the Church in 1989, and Lubachivsky along with other leadership of the UGCC officially returned to Lviv from exile on 30 March 1991.

Lubachivsky is buried in St. George's Cathedral in Lviv.

== Notes ==
Catholic Church titles
Preceded by Joseph M. Schmondiuk	Archbishop of Philadelphia; 1979—1980	Succeeded by Stephen Sulyk
Preceded by Josyf Slipyj	Major Archbishop of Lviv (exiled to Vatican); 1984—1991	Succeeded by Revival of the full title
Preceded by New title Volodymyr Sterniuk (Locum tenens of metropolitan see)	Major Archbishop of Lviv, Metropolitan of Galicia; 1991—2000	Succeeded by Lubomyr Husar
Catholic Church titles
New title	Cardinal Priest of Santa Sofia a Via Boccea; 25 May 1985 – 14 December 2000	Succeeded by Lubomyr Husar
