= Stari Petlykivtsi =

Stari Petlykivtsi Старі Петликівці
- Interactive map of Stari Petlykivtsi
- Coordinates: 49°08′00″N 25°22′21″E
- Country: Ukraine
- Oblast: Ternopil Oblast
- Raion: Chortkiv Raion

Area
  - Total: 3.327 km^{2} (1.285 sq mi)

Population (2001 census)
  - Total: 1 024
  - Density: 307.78/km^{2} (797.1/sq mi)
- Time zone: UTC+2 (EET)
  - Summer (DST): UTC+3 (EEST)
- Postal code: 48413
- Area code: +380 3544

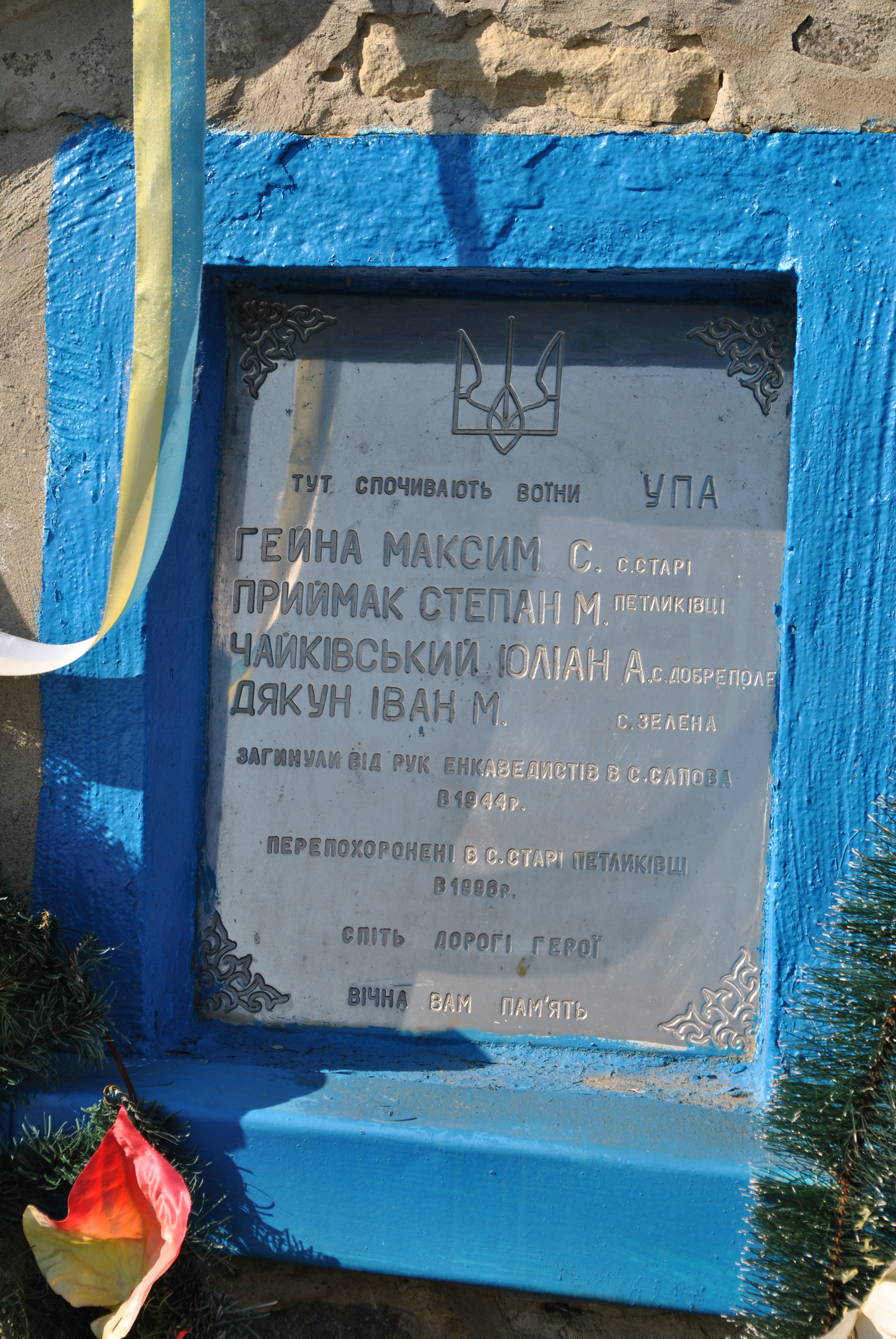

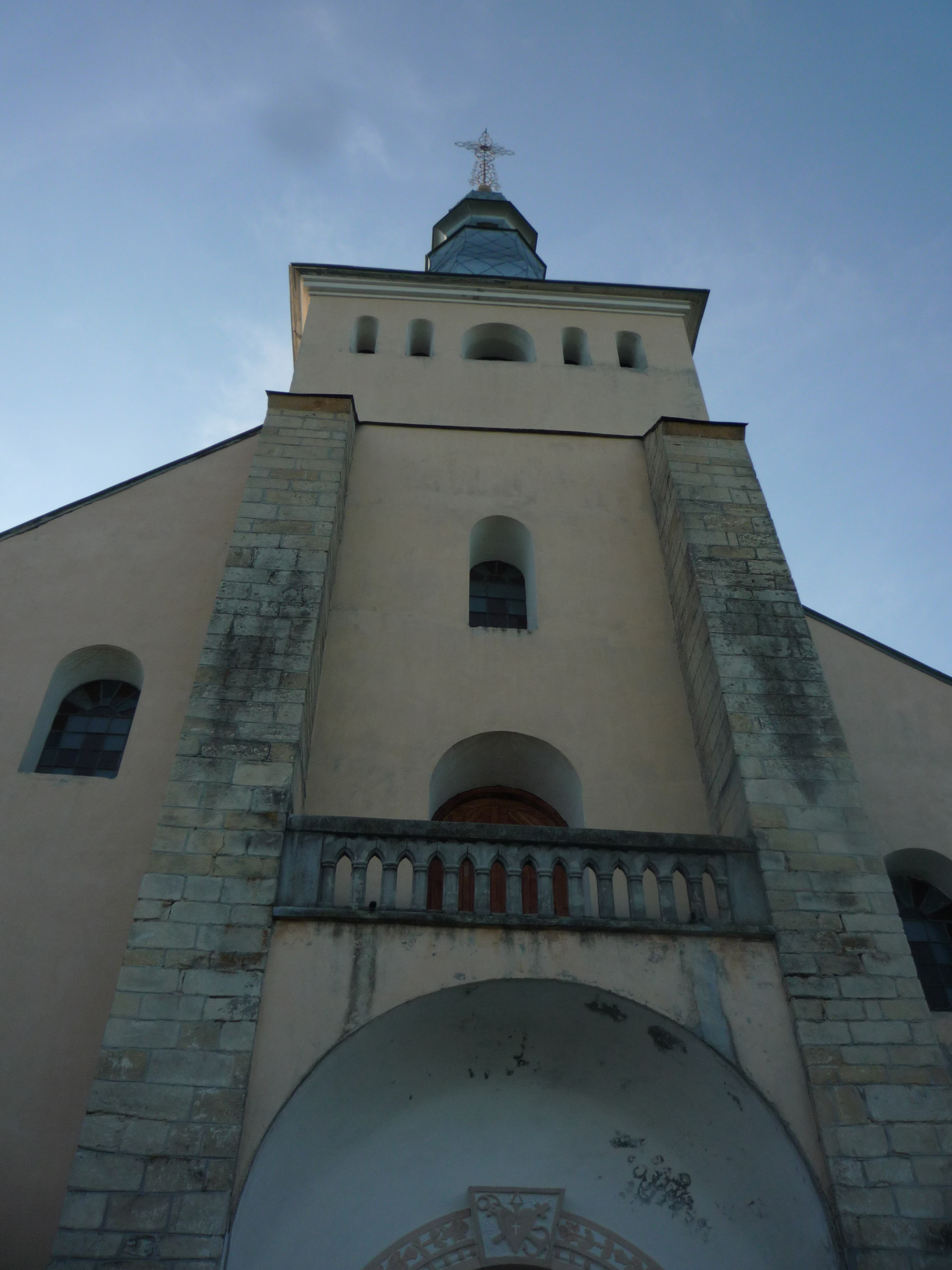

Stari Petlykivtsi (Ukrainian: Старі Петликівці) is a village in Chortkiv Raion (district) of Ternopil Oblast (province) in western Ukraine. It belongs to Buchach urban hromada, one of the hromadas of Ukraine. 1065 inhabitants lived in the village in 2007.

== History ==
The first written mention of the village comes from the 15th century. At that time it belonged to the Polish–Lithuanian Commonwealth. From 1772 until 1918 it belonged to the Austrian (Habsburg monarchy, Austrian Empire, Austria-Hungary) empires, and in 1918-1919 it belonged to the West Ukrainian People's Republic. Since 1991 it has belonged to Ukraine.

A reading room of Ukrainian society Prosvita operated in the village.

Until 18 July 2020, Stari Petlykivtsi belonged to Buchach Raion. The raion was abolished in July 2020 as part of the administrative reform of Ukraine, which reduced the number of raions of Ternopil Oblast to three. The area of Buchach Raion was merged into Chortkiv Raion.

== Attractions ==
- Church of St. Dmytro (1875, reconstr. 1991)
- Chapel with statue of Holy Virgin Mary
- Roman Catholic Church
- Symbolic grave in place re disposal of warriors of Ukrainian Insurgent Army (1996)

== Notable Persons ==
- Innocent Lotocky

== Sources ==
- (in Ukrainian) М. Бігус, В. Уніят, Старі Петликівці // Ternopil Encyclopedic Dictionary: in 4 v. / editorial board: H. Yavorskyi and other, Ternopil: "Zbruch", 2008, V. 3: П—Я, S. 334-335. — ISBN 978-966-528-279-2.
- "Petlikowce". Geographical Dictionary of the Kingdom of Poland (in Polish). 8. Warszawa: Kasa im. Józefa Mianowskiego. 1887. p. 24.
