= Manaiv =

Rural locality in Ternopil Oblast, Ukraine

Manaiv Манаїв
- Location in Ternopil Oblast
- Coordinates: 49°49′18″N 25°12′57″E
- Country: Ukraine
- Oblast: Ternopil Oblast
- Raion: Ternopil Raion
- Hromada: Zboriv urban hromada
- Time zone: UTC+2 (EET)
  - Summer (DST): UTC+3 (EEST)
- Postal code: 47220

Manaiv (Ukrainian: Манаїв, Polish: Manajów) is a village in the Zboriv urban hromada of the Ternopil Raion of Ternopil Oblast in Ukraine.

== History ==
The first written mention of the village was in 1483.

After the liquidation of the Zboriv Raion on 19 July 2020, the village became part of the Ternopil Raion.

== Religion ==
- Church of the Blessed Virgin Mary (1930, brick).

== Notable residents ==
- Constantine Bohachevsky (1884–1961), Ukrainian archbishop

== Sources ==
- (in Ukrainian) Базилевська З., Жукова М., Манаїв // Ternopil Encyclopedic Dictionary: in 4 v. / editorial board: H. Yavorskyi and other, Ternopil: "Zbruch", 2005, V. 2: К—О, 706 s. — ISBN 966-528-199-2.
- "Manajów". Geographical Dictionary of the Kingdom of Poland (in Polish). 6. Warszawa: Kasa im. Józefa Mianowskiego. 1885. p. 85.
