= Ukrainian Catholic National Shrine of the Holy Family =

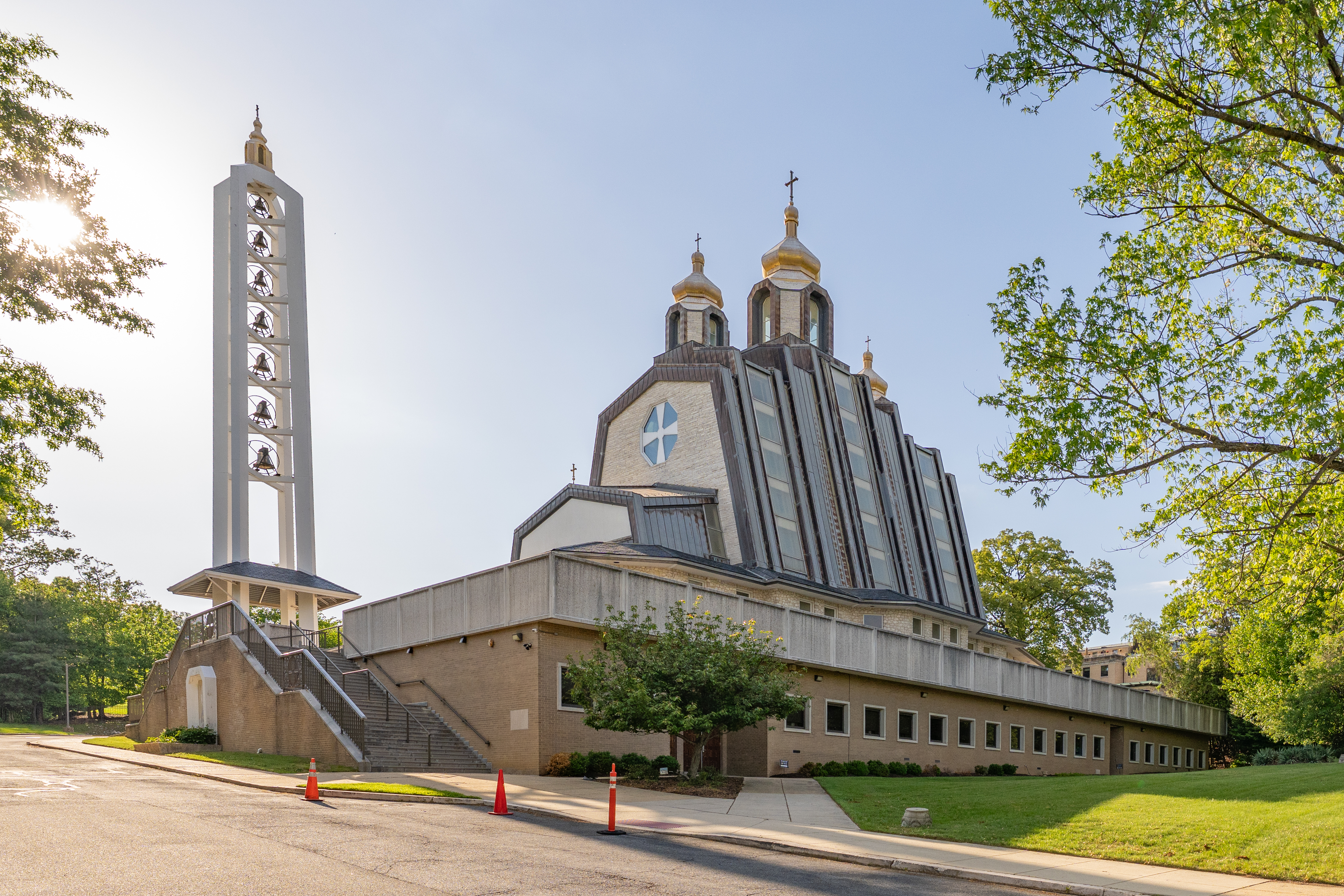
- Ukrainian Catholic National Shrine of the Holy Family in 2026
- Ukrainian Catholic; National Shrine of the Holy Family
- 38°56′23″N 77°00′13″W
- Location: 4250 Harewood Rd. NE; Washington, D.C.
- Country: United States
- Denomination: Ukrainian Greek Catholic Church
- Website: www.ucns-holyfamily.org

History
- Founded: September 1949

Architecture
- Architect: Myroslav Nimciv
- Completed: 1999

Administration
- Diocese: Ukrainian Catholic Archeparchy of Philadelphia

Clergy
- Bishop: Most Rev. Borys Gudziak
- Priest(s): Fr. Robert Hitchens; Fr. Wasyl Kharuk; Fr. Mykola Dziurakh

The Ukrainian Catholic National Shrine of the Holy Family is a Catholic church located near University Heights, Washington, D. C. The shrine is part of the Ukrainian Greek Catholic Church, a sui iuris Eastern Catholic church in communion with the Bishop of Rome. The shrine is administered by the Archeparchy of Philadelphia.

The Ukrainian Catholic National Shrine of the Holy Family is located immediately west of the Catholic University of America campus and roughly 250 feet north of the Saint John Paul II National Shrine. The Basilica of the National Shrine of the Immaculate Conception is located roughly a half a mile south along the east side of Harewood Road.

== History ==
Eparch Constantine Bohachevsky, the first Ukrainian metropolitan bishop in the United States, created Holy Family Parish in 1949 to serve the Ukrainian Greek Catholic population in Washington, D.C., as the nearest Ukrainian parishes to the Washington area until then had been outside of the District of Columbia. Fr. Vladimir Wozniak was the parish's first pastor. The parish would relocate four times until acquiring its current site 1975. In 1976, Bishop Basil H. Losten authorized the construction of the shrine, naming it "The Ukrainian Catholic National Shrine of the Holy Family."

The cornerstone of the Lower Church was blessed by Pope John Paul II in 1979, and the Great Upper Church of the National Shrine was completed in 1999.

== Architecture ==
The shrine was designed by architect and parishioner Miroslav Nimciv. Its architecture combines modernist forms with Ukrainian church-building traditions. The design uses the traditional Carpathian arrangement of separate roof forms above the altar, nave and narthex. The main body has a tent-like form with continuous bands of windows. Natural light illuminates the interior walls and vaults.

== See also ==
- List of the Catholic cathedrals of the United States
- List of the Catholic dioceses of the United States
- List of bishops
- List of District of Columbia-related topics
