= Paul Chomnycky =

Canadian bishop in Ukraine (born 1954)

His Grace The Most Reverend Paul Patrick Chomnycky O.S.B.M.
- Eparch of Stamford
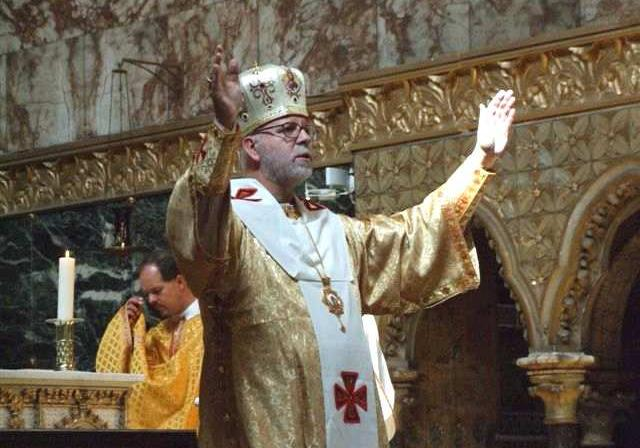
- Church: Ukrainian Greek Catholic Church
- Metropolis: Philadelphia
- Diocese: Stamford
- Appointed: January 3, 2006
- Installed: February 20, 2006
- Predecessor: Basil H. Losten
- Previous posts: Apostolic Exarch for Ukrainians in Great Britain; Titular Bishop of Buffada

Orders
- Ordination: October 1, 1988 by Jeronim Isidore Chimy
- Consecration: June 11, 2002 by Lubomyr Husar, Michael Bzdel and Lawrence Huculak

Personal details
- Born: 19 May 1954 (age 72) Vancouver, British Columbia, Canada
- Motto: Господь мій Пастир

Styles of Paul Patrick Chomnycky
- Reference style: His Grace; The Most Reverend
- Spoken style: His Grace
- Religious style: Bishop

Paul Patrick Chomnycky, OSBM (Note: Ukrainian: Павло Патрикій Хомницький, romanized: Pavlo Patrykii Khomnytskyi) (born 19 May 1954) is a bishop of the Ukrainian Catholic Church. In early 2026 he is the current bishop of the Diocese of Stamford, Connecticut.

== Education ==
Paul Chomnycky was born in Vancouver, Canada, the son of a Ukrainian-immigrant father and Canadian-born mother (both of whom died in 1996), and graduated from the University of British Columbia with a bachelor's degree in Commerce in 1980. After working as an accountant for two years, he entered the novitate of the Order of St. Basil the Great, working in the Basilian monastery in New York.

On 1 October 1988, he was ordained as a priest of the Order of St. Basil the Great. Then, he continued with further studies in Philosophy at the University of St. Anselm and the Gregorian University in Rome, receiving a Bachelor's in Sacred Theology in 1990.

Upon his return to Canada, he served briefly as an assistant pastor at Sts. Peter and Paul Church in Mundare, Alberta and St. Basil's, Edmonton. Eventually he would return to both parishes as their pastor in 1997 and 2000 and also served as the pastor of St. Mary's Church in Vancouver from 1994 to 1997. During his tenure as pastor at St. Basil's in Edmonton and St. Paul's in Mundare, he was also the superior of the local Basilian monastery.

Bishop Chomnycky also served as the Director of the Basilian Fathers museum in Mundare, a member of the Provincial Council of the Basilian Fathers of Canada, and a member of the college of consultors of the Edmonton Eparchy. He was appointed Exarch for Ukrainian Catholics in Great Britain on April 5, 2002 and consecrated bishop on June 11, 2002 by Cardinal Lubomyr Husar.

== See also ==
- Apostolic Exarchate for Ukrainians
- Catholic Church hierarchy
- Catholic Church in the United States
- Historical list of the Catholic bishops of the United States
- List of Catholic bishops of the United States
- Lists of patriarchs, archbishops, and bishops

== Episcopal succession ==
Catholic Church titles
Preceded by Basil H. Losten	Ukrainian Catholic Bishop of Stamford; 2006-Present	Succeeded by incumbent
Preceded by Michael Kuchmiak	Apostolic Exarch for Ukrainians in Great Britain; 2002-2006	Succeeded by Hlib Lonchyna
