= Michael Kuchmiak =

Michael Kuchmiak C.Ss.R.
- Apostolic Exarch of Great Britain
- Native name: Михайло Кучмяк
- Church: Ukrainian Greek Catholic Church
- See: Apostolic Exarchate of Great Britain
- In office: 24 June 1989 – 5 April 2002
- Predecessor: Augustine Hornyak
- Successor: Paul Chomnycky
- Other post: Titular Eparch of Agathopolis (1988-2008)
- Previous post: Auxiliary Eparch of Philadelphia (1988-1989)

Orders
- Ordination: 13 May 1956 by Isidore Borecky
- Consecration: 27 April 1988 by Stephen Sulyk

Personal details
- Born: 5 February 1923 Obertyn, Stanisławów Voivodeship, Poland
- Died: 26 August 2008 (aged 85) Saskatoon, Saskatchewan, Canada

Michael Kuchmiak, (Note: Ukrainian: Михайло Кучмяк, romanized: Mykhailo Kuchmiak) C.Ss.R. (5 February 1923 – 26 August 2008) was a bishop of the Ukrainian Greek Catholic Church and titular bishop of Agathopolis since 1988.

Kuchmiak was born in Obertyn, Ukraine. The Synod of Bishops of the Ukrainian Catholic Church and Pope John Paul II appointed Kuchmiak as auxiliary bishop of the Ukrainian Catholic Archeparchy of Philadelphia on 8 March 1988.

He received his episcopal ordination on 27 April 1988, with Stephen Sulyk, Archeparch of Philadelphia, as his principal consecrator and Maxim Hermaniuk and Innocent Lotocky as co-consecrators. He remained pastor of the Ukrainian Catholic National Shrine of the Holy Family in Washington, D.C. until his appointment on 11 July 1989 as the Apostolic Exarch of the Apostolic Exarchate for Ukrainians in Great Britain.

On 5 April 2002, the Pope accepted the resignation of Apostolic Exarch Mykhailo Kuchmyak from the government in connection with his reaching the age of retirement. Kuchmiak died in 2008 in Saskatoon, Saskatchewan, Canada.

== See also ==
- Ukrainian Greek Catholic Church
- Apostolic Exarchate for Ukrainians

== Notes ==
Catholic Church titles
Preceded by Augustine Hornyak	Apostolic Exarch for Ukrainians in Great Britain; 1989–2002	Succeeded by Paul Patrick Chomnycky
