= Ukrainian Catholic Eparchy of Saint Josaphat in Parma =

Ukrainian Greek Catholic ecclesiastical jurisdiction in the United States

Coordinates: 41.40685°N 81.71266°W

Eparchy of Ukrainian Greek Catholic Eparchy of Saint Josaphat in Parma Пармської єпархії святого Йосафата Eparchia Sancti Iosaphat Parmensis
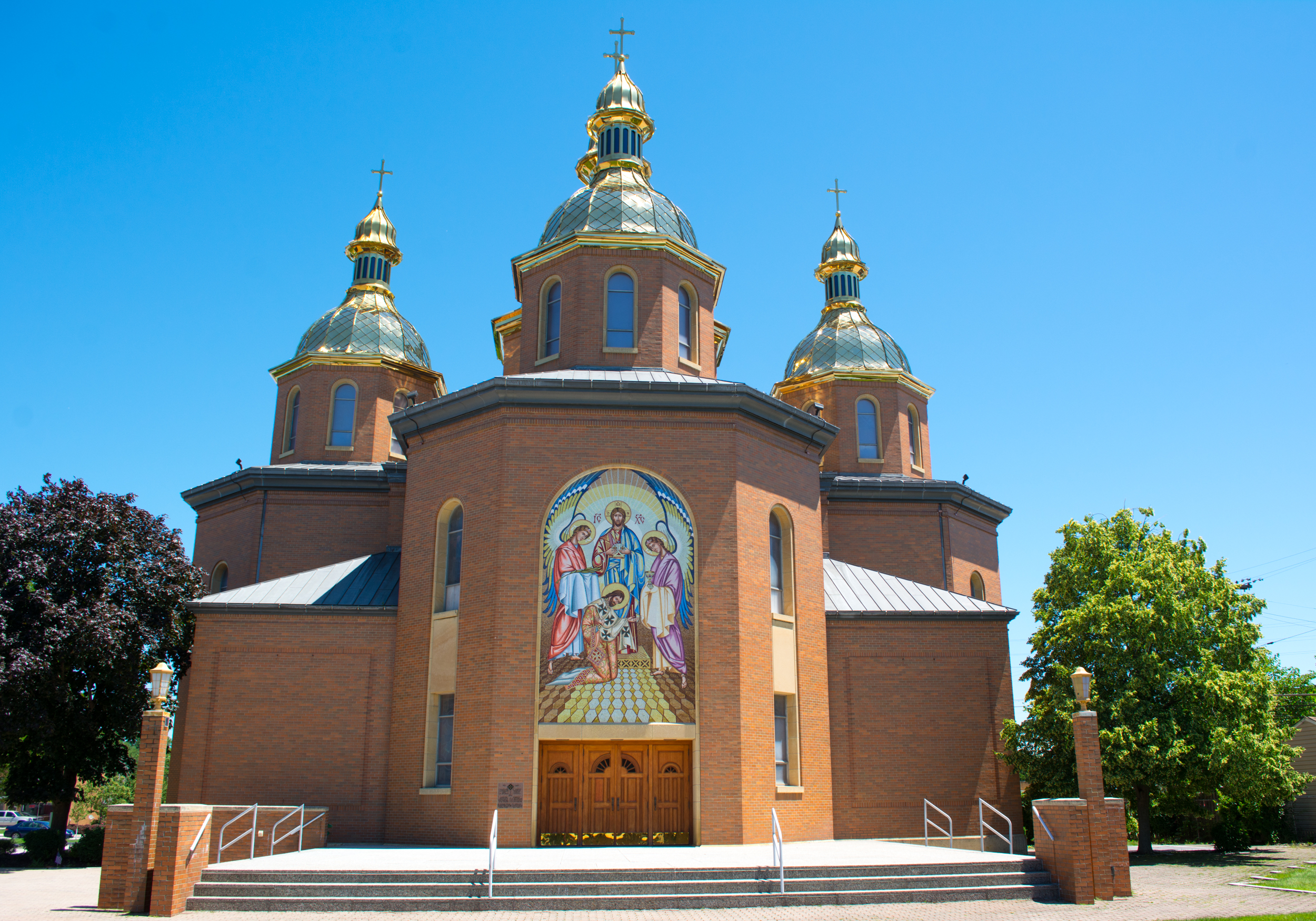
- St. Josaphat Ukrainian Catholic Cathedral in Parma, Ohio

Location
- Country: United States
- Territory: Ohio, Western Pennsylvania, West Virginia, Kentucky, Tennessee, Mississippi, Alabama, Georgia, Florida, North Carolina and South Carolina
- Ecclesiastical province: Ukrainian Catholic Metropolia of Philadelphia
- Headquarters: Parma, Ohio, United States

Statistics
- Population: 10,701
- Parishes: 47

Information
- Denomination: Catholic Church
- Sui iuris church: Ukrainian Greek Catholic Church
- Rite: Byzantine Rite
- Established: December 5, 1983
- Cathedral: St. Josaphat's Ukrainian Catholic Cathedral

Current leadership
- Pope: Leo XIV
- Major Archbishop: Sviatoslav Shevchuk
- Bishop: Bohdan Danylo

Website
- Ukrainian Catholic Eparchy of Parma

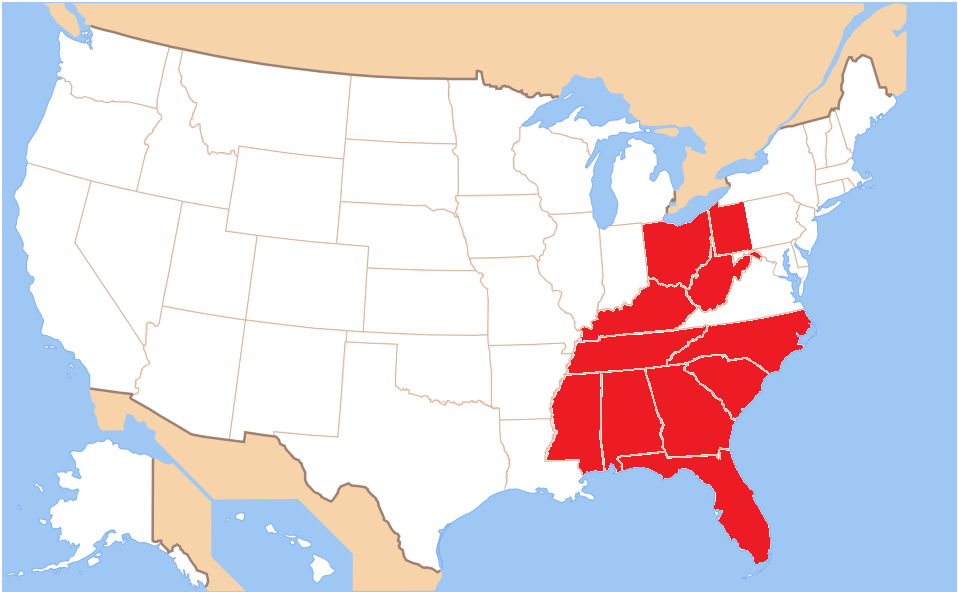
Map of the Eparchy of Parma

Ukrainian Catholic Eparchy of Saint Josaphat in Parma is a Ukrainian Greek Catholic Church ecclesiastical jurisdiction or eparchy of the Catholic Church in the United States. Its episcopal see is Parma, Ohio. It was established in 1983 by Pope John Paul II. The eparchy encompasses parishes in Florida, Georgia, North Carolina, Ohio, western Pennsylvania, Tennessee, and West Virginia. The Eparchy of Saint Josaphat in Parma is a suffragan eparchy in the ecclesiastical province of the metropolitan Archeparchy of Philadelphia.

The eparchy is named for St. Josaphat Kuntsevych, O.S.B.M., who was Eastern Catholic martyred in anti-Catholic violence by Eastern Orthodox following the Union of Brest.

== History ==
Ohio became a major site of ethnic Ukrainian and Ruthenian immigration in the 1870s. By the 1880s, Cleveland and Tremont were sites of major Ukrainian communities. Parma and other Ohio towns were further populated by Ukrainian diaspora fleeing in the wake of the First World War and subsequent incorporation of Ukraine into the Soviet Union. Another major wave of Ukrainian immigration to the United States came after President Harry S. Truman signed the Displaced Persons Act in 1948.

== Eparchs ==
- Robert M. Moskal (1984-2009)
- Bohdan Danylo (2014–Present)

== Metropolia of Philadelphia for the Ukrainians ==
The eparchy is one of three suffragan eparchies of the Ukrainian Catholic Metropolia of Philadelphia, which also includes the metropolitan Ukrainian Catholic Archeparchy of Philadelphia, the Ukrainian Catholic Eparchy of Saint Nicholas of Chicago, and the Ukrainian Catholic Eparchy of Stamford.

== See also ==
- Ukrainian Catholic National Shrine of the Holy Family
- List of the Catholic cathedrals of the United States
- List of the Catholic dioceses of the United States
- List of bishops
