= Jaroslav Gabro =

His Grace, The Most Reverend Jaroslav Gabro
- Eparch of Saint Nicholas of Chicago
- Church: Ukrainian Greek Catholic Church
- Appointed: July 14, 1961
- In office: October 26, 1961 - March 28, 1980
- Successor: Innocent Lotocky, O.S.B.M.

Orders
- Ordination: September 27, 1945
- Consecration: October 26, 1961 by Ambrozij Andrew Senyshyn, O.S.B.M.

Personal details
- Born: July 31, 1919 Chicago, Illinois
- Died: March 28, 1980 (aged 60) Chicago, Illinois

Jaroslav Gabro (July 31, 1919 - March 28, 1980) was an American Catholic prelate who served as the first Eparch of Chicago from 1961 to 1980.

== Biography ==
Born in Chicago, Illinois Gabro was ordained a priest for the Apostolic Exarchate of United States of America on September 27, 1945. Pope John XXIII named him as the bishop of St. Nicholas of Chicago on July 14, 1961. He was ordained a bishop by Archbishop Ambrozij Andrew Senyshyn, O.S.B.M. of Philadelphia on October 26, 1961. The principal co-consecrators were Bishop Isidore Borecky of Toronto and Bishop Joseph M. Schmondiuk of Stamford. He attended all four sessions of the Second Vatican Council (1962-1965). Gabro served the eparchy as its bishop until his death on March 28, 1980, at the age of 60.
