= Joseph Michael Schmondiuk =

- Archeparch of Philadelphia
- Church: Ukrainian Greek Catholic Church
- Archdiocese: Archeparchy of Philadelphia
- In office: September 20, 1977 – December 25, 1978
- Predecessor: Ambrose Senyshyn
- Successor: Myroslav Ivan Lubachivsky
- Previous posts: Eparch of Stamford (1961-1977); Titular Bishop of Zeugma in Syria (1956-1961); Auxiliary Bishop of the Archeparchy of Philadelphia (1958-1961); Auxiliary Bishop of the Apostolic Exarchate of United States of America (1956-1958)

Orders
- Ordination: March 29, 1936 by Oleksandr Stoyka
- Consecration: November 8, 1956 by Constantine Bohachevsky

Personal details
- Born: August 6, 1912 Wall, Pennsylvania, United States
- Died: December 25, 1978 (aged 66) Philadelphia, Pennsylvania, United States

Joseph Michael Schmondiuk (Note: Ukrainian: Йосиф Михайло Шмондюк, romanized: Yosyf Mykhailo Shmondiuk) (August 6, 1912 – December 25, 1978) was a Ukrainian Catholic prelate who served as Archeparch of Philadelphia. He was the first Ukrainian Catholic bishop born in the United States.

On August 14, 1961, Schmondiuk was appointed Bishop of Stamford, succeeding Ambrose Senyshyn. On September 20, 1977, he was appointed Archbishop of Philadelphia. Schmondiuk was a Council Father of the Second Vatican Council.

== Notes ==
Religious titles
Preceded by Ambrose Senyshyn	Ukrainian Catholic Eparch of Stamford; 1961—1977	Succeeded by Basil H. Losten
Preceded by Ambrose Senyshyn	Ukrainian Catholic Archeparch of Philadelphia; 1977—1979	Succeeded by Myroslav Ivan Lubachivsky
