= Basil H. Losten =

Ukrainian bishop (1930–2024)

His Grace, The Most Reverend Basil Harry Losten D.D., S.T.L., LL.D (Hon.)
- Eparch Emeritus of Stamford
- Church: Ukrainian Greek Catholic Church
- Diocese: Ukrainian Catholic Eparchy of Stamford
- Appointed: September 20, 1977
- Installed: December 7, 1977
- Retired: January 3, 2006
- Predecessor: Joseph M. Schmondiuk
- Successor: Paul Patrick Chomnycky
- Previous post: Auxiliary Bishop of Ukrainian Catholic Archeparchy of Philadelphia and Titular Bishop of Arcadiopolis in Asia (1971–1977)

Orders
- Ordination: June 10, 1957 by Konštantín Bohačevskyj
- Consecration: May 25, 1971 by Ambrose Senyshyn, Jaroslav Gabro and Michael Dudick

Personal details
- Born: May 11, 1930 Chesapeake City, Maryland, U.S.
- Died: September 15, 2024 (aged 94) Stamford, Connecticut, U.S.

Styles of Basil Harry Losten
- Reference style: His Grace; The Most Reverend
- Spoken style: His Grace
- Religious style: Bishop

Basil Harry Losten (May 11, 1930 – September 15, 2024) was a bishop of the Ukrainian Greek Catholic Church in the USA. He was until his death Bishop Emeritus of the Ukrainian Catholic Diocese of Stamford, Connecticut. He was succeeded by Bishop Paul Patrick Chomnycky.

== Early life, family and education ==
Losten was born in Chesapeake City, Maryland and was the youngest of ten children in a farming family.

He attended St. Basil School in Philadelphia, Pennsylvania, and then the Ukrainian Catholic seminary in Stamford, Connecticut, graduating from its St. Basil College Seminary with a bachelor of arts in philosophy. In 1957, he completed his graduate work in theology at the Catholic University of America.

== Priesthood ==
On June 10, 1957, Losten was ordained to the priesthood by Bishop Constantine Bohachevsky. His first assignment included work as chancery secretary for the Philadelphia Archdiocese as well as working in several Philadelphia parishes. In 1962, he was named personal secretary to Archbishop-Metropolitan Ambrose Senyshyn. This position led him to various posts within the eparchy, including comptroller and consultor, president of Ascension Manor (a senior citizens complex - a project he initiated), director of the Archdiocesan Insurance Commission, and a member of the Archdiocesan Building Commission.

In 1968, Pope Paul VI raised him to the rank of papal chamberlain. He was nominated to the episcopacy on March 23, 1971, and was consecrated on May 25, 1971. He was named auxiliary to the Ukrainian Archdiocese of Philadelphia and in 1976, during Senyshyn’s failing health, Pope Paul VI appointed Losten apostolic administrator in charge of diocesan affairs. In September 1977, Losten was named Bishop of Stamford, succeeding Joseph M. Schmondiuk. The diocese comprises New York State and all of the New England states.

He retired on January 3, 2006, and was succeeded by Paul Chomnycky. After his retirement, he continued to work in support of several causes, including the Ukrainian Museum and Library of Stamford, the Ukrainian Catholic University in Lviv, Ukraine, and the endowment of a Ukrainian Church Studies program at the Catholic University of America. During the first months of the 2022 Russian invasion of Ukraine, he acted as an advisor to Patriarch Sviatoslav Shevchuk.

== Personal life and demise ==
Losten died after a short illness at a hospital in Stamford, Connecticut, on September 15, 2024. He was 94 years old.

== See also ==
- Catholic Church hierarchy
- Catholic Church in the United States
- Historical list of the Catholic bishops of the United States
- List of Catholic bishops of the United States
- Lists of patriarchs, archbishops, and bishops

== Sources ==
- Jaksic, Vesna (February 21, 2006). "A new leader: Bishop installed as head of Ukrainian Catholics in area". The Advocate. Stamford, Connecticut.
- "Bishop Emeritus Basil Losten, builder of the Church in the U.S. and Ukraine". Ukrainian Weekly. 2006.

== Episcopal succession ==
Catholic Church titles
Preceded by Joseph M. Schmondiuk	Bishop of Stamford; 1977–2006	Succeeded by Paul Patrick Chomnycky
