= Stefan Soroka =

Canadian prelate of the Ukrainian Greek Catholic Church

His Grace, The Most Reverend Stefan Soroka
- Archeparch Emeritus of the Archeparchy of Philadelphia
- Church: Ukrainian Greek Catholic Church
- Metropolis: Philadelphia
- Appointed: November 29, 2000
- Installed: February 27, 2001
- Retired: April 16, 2018
- Predecessor: Stephen Sulyk
- Successor: Borys Gudziak
- Previous posts: Auxiliary Bishop of Ukrainian Catholic Archeparchy of Winnipeg and Titular Bishop of Acrassus (1996-2001)

Orders
- Ordination: June 13, 1982 by Maxim Hermaniuk
- Consecration: June 13, 1996 by Michael Bzdel, Cornelius Pasichny, and Wolodymyr Paska

Personal details
- Born: November 13, 1951 (age 74) Winnipeg, Manitoba
- Motto: One who serves

Styles of Stefan Soroka
- Reference style: His Grace; The Most Reverend
- Spoken style: His Grace
- Religious style: Metropolitan

Stefan Soroka (born November 13, 1951) is a Canadian prelate of the Ukrainian Greek Catholic Church (UGCC). He served as Archbishop of Philadelphia and Metropolitan of the UGCC in the United States from 2000 to 2018.

== Life and career ==
He was born to Ivan (1920–1993) and Anna (née Galek, 1920–1973) Soroka in Winnipeg, Manitoba, where his family had immigrated that exact same year. After studying at the Catholic University of America, the University of Manitoba, and St. Josaphat Seminary, Soroka was ordained to the priesthood by Archbishop Maxim Hermaniuk, C.Ss.R., on June 13, 1982. He then served as Vice-Chancellor (1985–1994) and Chancellor (1994–1996) of Winnipeg, along with doing pastoral work.

On March 29, 1996, Soroka was appointed Titular Bishop of Acarassus and Auxiliary Bishop and Vicar General of Winnipeg. He received his episcopal consecration on the following June 13 from Archbishop Michael Bzdel, C.Ss.R., with Bishops Cornelius Pasichny, OSBM, and Wolodymyr Paska serving as co-consecrators, in the Cathedral of Ss. Vladimir and Olga.

Soroka was named the sixth Archbishop of Philadelphia on November 29, 2000, and was installed as such on February 27, 2001. In this capacity, he was the head of the Ukrainian Catholic Church in Philadelphia, which is in full communion with the Holy See. Pope Francis accepted his resignation for medical reasons on April 16, 2018.

He obtained his baccalaureate in theology from the CUA in May 1982, and his master's in social work from the University of Manitoba in May 1973.

== See also ==
- Catholic Church hierarchy
- Catholic Church in the United States
- Historical list of the Catholic bishops of the United States
- List of Catholic bishops of the United States
- Lists of patriarchs, archbishops, and bishops

== Episcopal succession ==
Catholic Church titles
Preceded by Stephen Sulyk	Ukrainian Catholic Archbishop of Philadelphia; 2001–2018	Succeeded by Borys Gudziak
Preceded by -	Ukrainian Catholic Auxiliary Bishop of Winnipeg; 1996-2001	Succeeded by -
