= Soter Ortynsky =

His Grace, The Most Reverend Stephen Soter Ortynsky Hentosh O.S.B.M.
- Church: Ukrainian Greek Catholic Church
- Appointed: March 26, 1907
- Term ended: March 24, 1916
- Successor: Constantine Bohachevsky, Basil Takach

Orders
- Ordination: July 18, 1891 (Priest)
- Consecration: May 12, 1907 (Bishop) by Andrey Sheptytsky

Personal details
- Born: January 29, 1866 Ortynychi, Kingdom of Galicia and Lodomeria, Austrian Empire
- Died: 24 March 1916 (aged 50) Philadelphia, Pennsylvania, USA

Stephen Soter Ortynsky Hentosh, O.S.B.M. (Ukrainian: Сотер Ортинський; 29 January 1866 – 24 March 1916) was an Austrian Catholic prelate who served as the first bishop of all Greek Catholics in the United States. He was a member of the Order of Saint Basil the Great.

== Life ==
He was born in Ortynice in Sambor County as Stephen Ortynsky de Labetz (Stefan Ortyński), into a family of the minor nobility of the Łabędź coat of arms.

January 1, 1889, he made his vows with the Basilian Order.

July 18, 1891, he was ordained a priest by Metropolitan of Lviv Sylvester Sembratovych and celebrated his first Liturgy at the Monastery Church in Dobromyl.

March 26, 1907, with Ea Semper Pope Pius X appointed him bishop for the Greek Catholics in America and named him titular Bishop of Daulia.

May 12, 1907, he was consecrated Bishop by Metropolitan Andrey Sheptytsky, Bishop Konstantyn Chekhovych and Bishop Hryhory Khomyshyn in St. George's Cathedral, Lviv.

May 28, 1913, the Apostolic See named Bishop Ortynsky as exarch, granting him full ordinary jurisdiction, making him independent of every Latin diocese. On August 17, 1914, the Congregation de propaganda fide put out a decree about the governance of the Greek Catholic Church for the next ten years, called “Cum Episcopo”. It had four main points: 1) The bishop is subject only to the apostolic see and his seat is to be New York City while the vicar general and rector of the seminary should be in Philadelphia; 2) That they establish a seminary; 3) That the faithful should belong to their own church; and 4) Deals with mixed marriages and states that youth should be baptized in the rite of the father.

Bishop Ortynsky contracted pneumonia and died in Philadelphia on March 24, 1916. An estimated 10-15 thousand people attended the funeral. The celebrant was the Vicar General of the Eparchy, Very Rev. Aleksander Dzubay.

== Mission ==
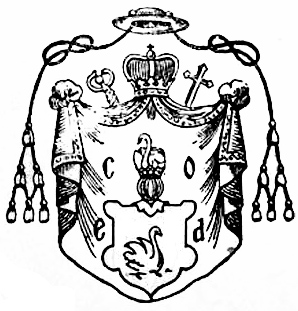
Coat of Arms of Bishop Ortynsky

His short tenure as Bishop was noted by his work setting up orphanages and a cathedral in Philadelphia, but unfortunately also for schism with the priests and parishes under his authority. The exact reasons for the disagreements with the bishop are unclear. Initially they might have arisen from Bishop Ortynsky being under the authority of the Archbishop of Philadelphia as per the order of Pope Pius X. Also, that Bishop Ortynsky was Ruthenian and Ruthenians were subject people of the Hungarians within the Austro-Hungarian Empire and that Hungarian priests may have thought that they should not be under a Ruthenian.

He invited a group of Ukrainian nuns to Philadelphia who became the first founders of Manor College, led by Mother Helena Emilia Langevych, OSBM.

Furthermore, in a 21 August 1912 open letter to the Amerikansky Russky Viestnik, the parishioners of Holy Trinity Greek Catholic Church in Browerville, Minnesota announced that they had refused to surrender the parish and cemetery deeds to Bishop Soter Ortynsky. This was because the Greek Catholics of Browerville were Rusyns from Transcarpathia and members of the Ruthenian Greek Catholic Church, and they accordingly viewed Bishop Soter, a Ukrainian from Galicia, as a foreigner. They intended instead to wait for a Rusyn Bishop to arrive in North America before surrendering the deed.

Bishop Ortynsky himself also noted that members of Russian Orthodox Church were fomenting trouble.

“Bishop Ortynski complains, however, that his work is interfered with by members of the schimastic Russian Church, whose representatives at times attend the religious services of the Ruthenians and create disturbances. The motives of the schismatics, the Bishop says are not religious, but political. They owe, first of all, allegiance to the Czar, and hence try to increase Russian influence by winning over the various Slav nationalities to the State Church.”

The World War II Liberty Ship SS Soter Ortynsky was named in his honor.

== Notes ==
Religious titles
| Preceded by Incumbent | Ukrainian Catholic Archeparchy of Philadelphia; 1907—1916 | Succeeded by Constantine Bohachevsky |
