= Innocent Lotocky =

American Ukrainian Catholic bishop

Innocent Lotocky, O.S.B.M
- Bishop of Ukrainian Catholic Eparchy of Chicago
- Native name: Інокентій Ілярій Лотоцький
- Church: Ukrainian Catholic Church
- See: Ukrainian Catholic Eparchy of Chicago
- In office: 1980–1993
- Predecessor: Jaroslaw Gabro
- Successor: Michael Wiwchar, C.Ss.R.
- Previous post: Priest

Orders
- Ordination: November 24, 1940

Personal details
- Born: November 3, 1915 Stari Petlykivtsi, Austro-Hungarian Empire (now Ukraine)
- Died: July 4, 2013 (aged 97) Chicago, Illinois

Innocent Iliarii Lotocky, O.S.B.M (Note: Ukrainian: Інокентій Ілярій Лотоцький, romanized: Inokentii Iliarii Lototskyi) (November 3, 1915 – July 4, 2013) was an American Bishop of the Ukrainian Catholic Church. Prior to his consecration as bishop, he served for many years as pastor of Immaculate Conception Ukrainian Catholic Church in Hamtramck, Michigan.

== Life ==
Lotocky was born in Stari Petlykivtsi in present-day Ukraine. In November 24, 1940, he was ordained as a priest in the Religious Order of Saint Basil the Great. From 1962 to 1980, he served as Pastor of Immaculate Conception Ukrainian Catholic Church in Hamtramck. He was appointed to the Ukrainian Catholic Eparchy of Chicago on December 22, 1980, and ordained as Bishop Innocent on March 22, 1981. Lotocky remained at the Ukrainian Catholic Eparchy of Chicago until July 2, 1993.

On June 29, 2013, after difficulty breathing, Bishop Innocent was taken to hospital. His condition deteriorated, and he died peacefully in Presence St. Mary Medical Center in Chicago, Illinois, on July 4, 2013.

== See also ==
- Ukrainian Catholic Eparchy of Chicago
- Ukrainian Greek Catholic Church
