= Ukrainian Catholic Eparchy of Chicago =

Ukrainian Greek Catholic ecclesiastical jurisdiction in Western & Midwest USA

Coordinates: 41°52′N 87°37′W

Eparchy of Saint Nicholas of Chicago Eparchia Sancti Nicolai Chicagiensis Ucrainorum
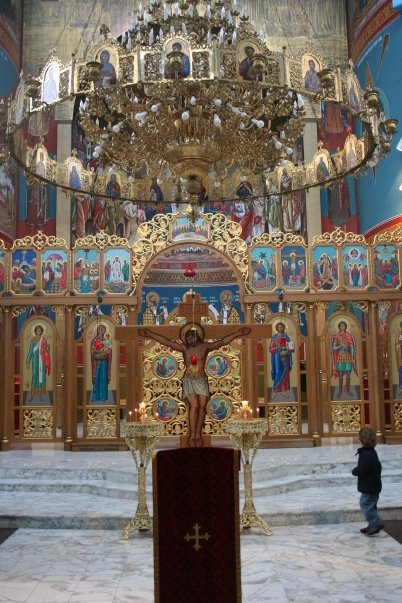
- The interior of St. Joseph the Betrothed Ukrainian Greek Catholic Church in Chicago

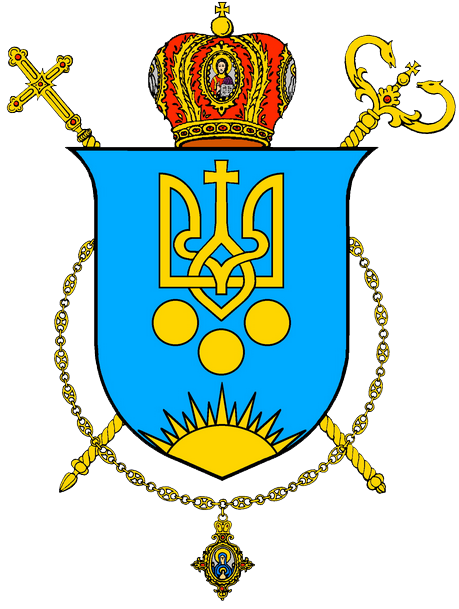
- Coat of arms

Location
- Territory: Western United States, all of the Midwest (except Ohio), Alaska, and Hawaii
- Ecclesiastical province: Ukrainian Catholic Metropolia of Philadelphia
- Headquarters: Chicago, Illinois, United States
- Population: 12,500

Information
- Denomination: Catholic Church
- Sui iuris church: Ukrainian Greek Catholic Church
- Rite: Byzantine Rite
- Established: July 14, 1961
- Cathedral: St. Nicholas Ukrainian Catholic Cathedral

Current leadership
- Pope: Leo XIV
- Major Archbishop: Sviatoslav Shevchuk
- Bishop: Venedykt Aleksiychuk, M.S.U.

Website
- Ukrainian Catholic Eparchy of Saint Nicholas of Chicago

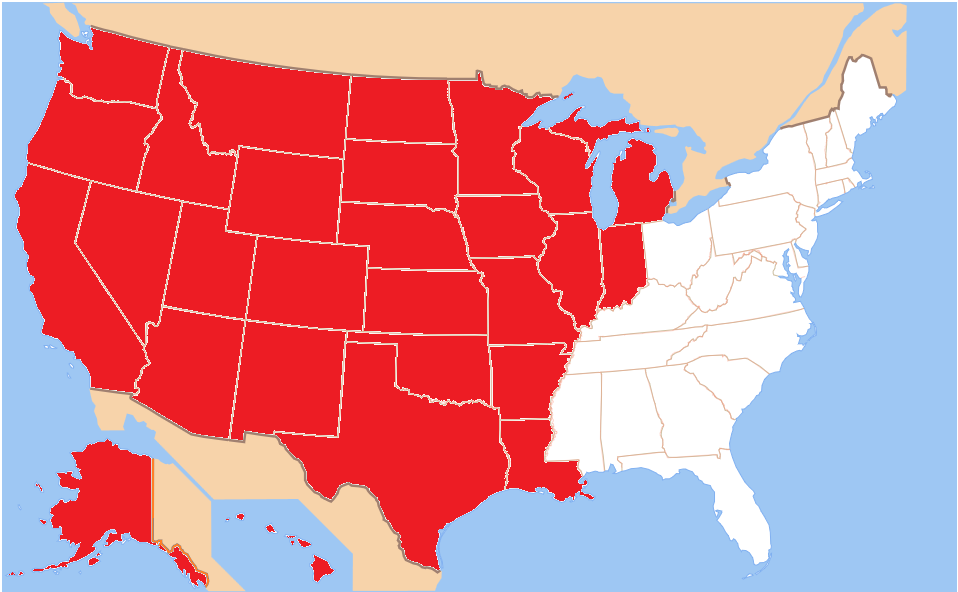
Map of the Eparchy of Chicago

The Ukrainian Catholic Eparchy of Saint Nicholas of Chicago is a Ukrainian Greek Catholic Church ecclesiastical territory or eparchy of the Catholic Church in the whole Western United States and Midwest (except Ohio), Alaska, and Hawaii. As of 2020, the St. Nicholas Eparchy has 43 churches and missions in the western USA.

Current bishop Venedykt Aleksiychuk was appointed the bishop of the eparchy on April 20, 2017 and was enthroned on June 29, 2017. St. Nicholas Ukrainian Catholic Cathedral is the mother church of the eparchy. The Eparchy of Chicago is a suffragan eparchy in the ecclesiastical province of the metropolitan Archeparchy of Philadelphia.

== Eparchs of Chicago ==
1. Jaroslav Gabro (1961-1980)
2. Innocent Lotocky, O.S.B.M. (1980 - 1993)
3. Michael Wiwchar, C.Ss.R. (1993 - 2000), appointed Eparch of Saskatoon
4. Richard Seminack (2003 - 2016)
5. Venedykt Aleksiychuk, M.S.U. (2017 – present)

== Metropolia of Philadelphia for the Ukrainians ==
The eparchy is one of four suffragan eparchies of the Ukrainian Catholic Metropolia of Philadelphia, which also includes the Ukrainian Catholic Archeparchy of Philadelphia, the Ukrainian Catholic Eparchy of Stamford, and the Ukrainian Catholic Eparchy of Parma.

== Parishes ==
The eparchy governs parishes located in the following states:

- Arizona
- California
- Colorado
- Illinois
- Indiana
- Michigan
- Minnesota
- Missouri
- Nebraska
- North Dakota
- Oregon
- Texas
- Utah
- Washington
- Wisconsin

== See also ==
- Ukrainian Catholic National Shrine of the Holy Family
- List of the Catholic cathedrals of the United States
- List of the Catholic dioceses of the United States
- List of bishops
