= Ukrainian Catholic Eparchy of Stamford =

Eastern Catholic eparchy in New England & New York, USA

Coordinates: 41.06188°N 73.52749°W

Eparchy of Ukrainian Greek Catholic Eparchy of Stamford Eparchia Stanfordensis Ucrainorum
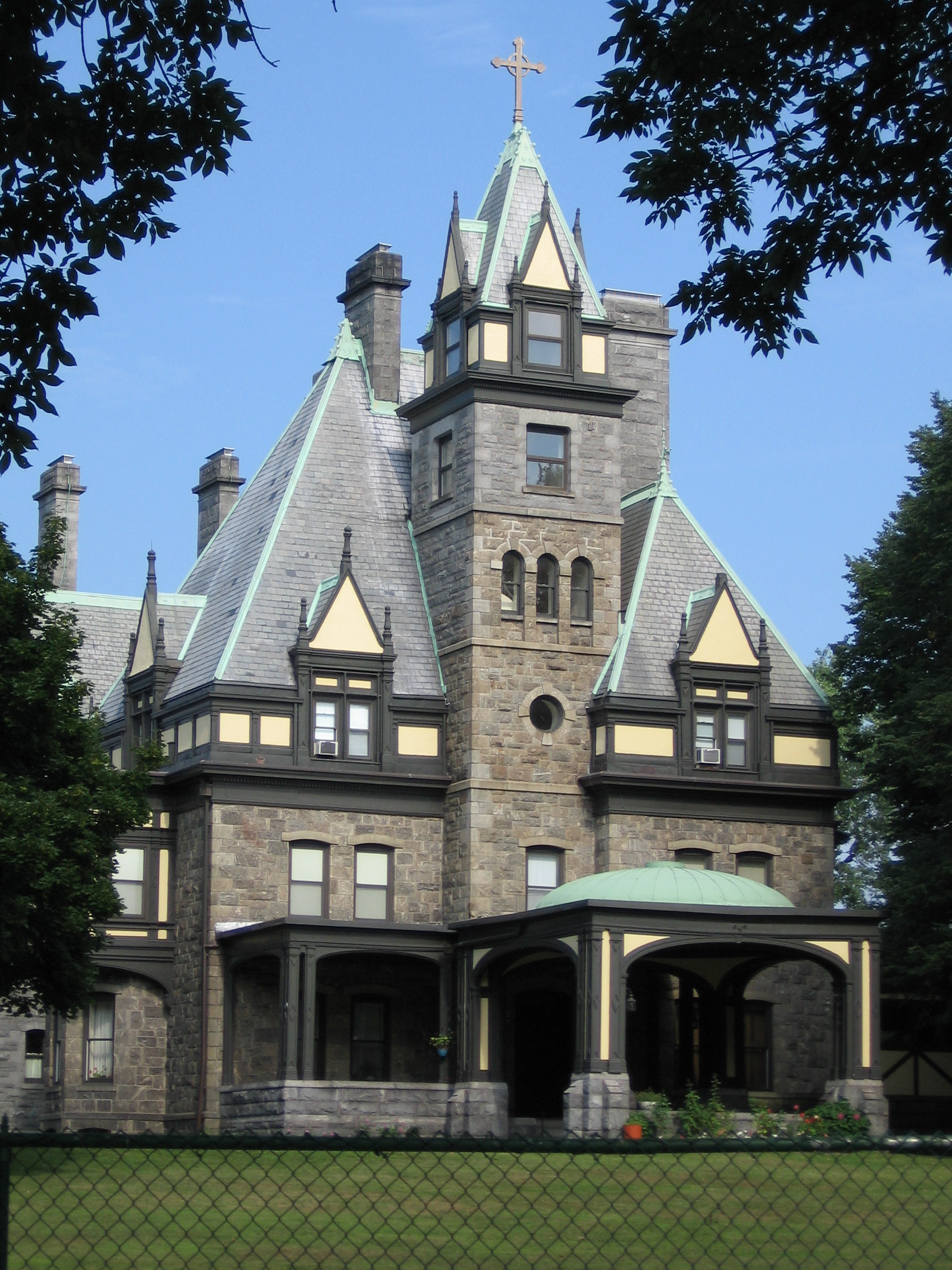
- "The Chateau" at St. Basil College in Stamford, Connecticut was originally a college dormitory and now houses the Ukrainian Museum and Library of Stamford.

Location
- Territory: New York State and New England
- Ecclesiastical province: Ukrainian Catholic Metropolia of Philadelphia
- Headquarters: Stamford, Connecticut, United States

Statistics
- Population: 14,960
- Parishes: 56

Information
- Denomination: Catholic Church
- Sui iuris church: Ukrainian Greek Catholic Church
- Rite: Byzantine Rite
- Established: December 5, 1983
- Cathedral: St. Volodymyr Cathedral

Current leadership
- Pope: Leo XIV
- Major Archbishop: Sviatoslav Shevchuk
- Bishop: Paul Patrick Chomnycky, O.S.B.M., Bishop of the Ukrainian Catholic Eparchy of Stamford
- Metropolitan Archbishop: Borys Gudziak, Archbishop of the Ukrainian Catholic Archeparchy of Philadelphia

Map
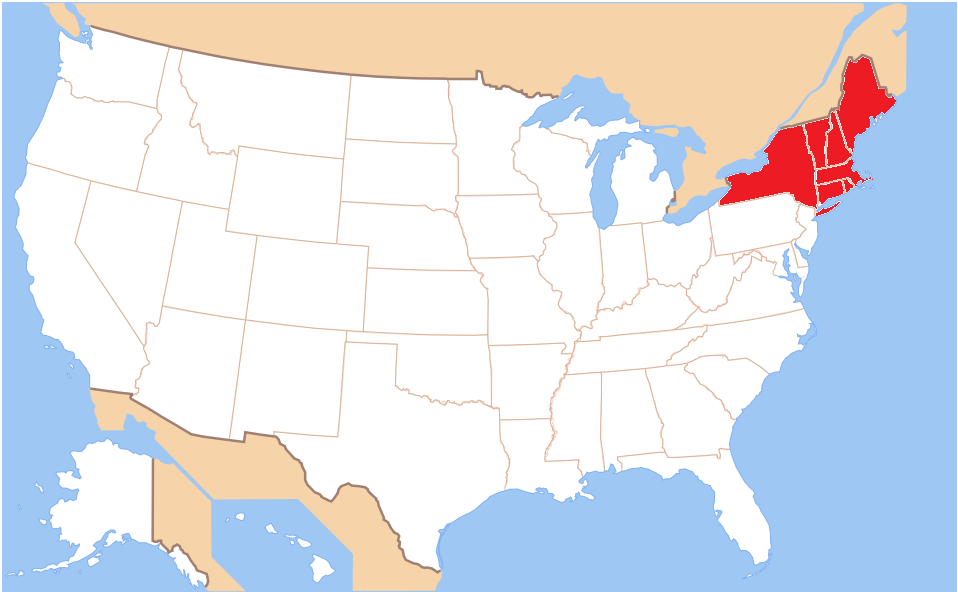

Website
- Eparchy of Stamford website

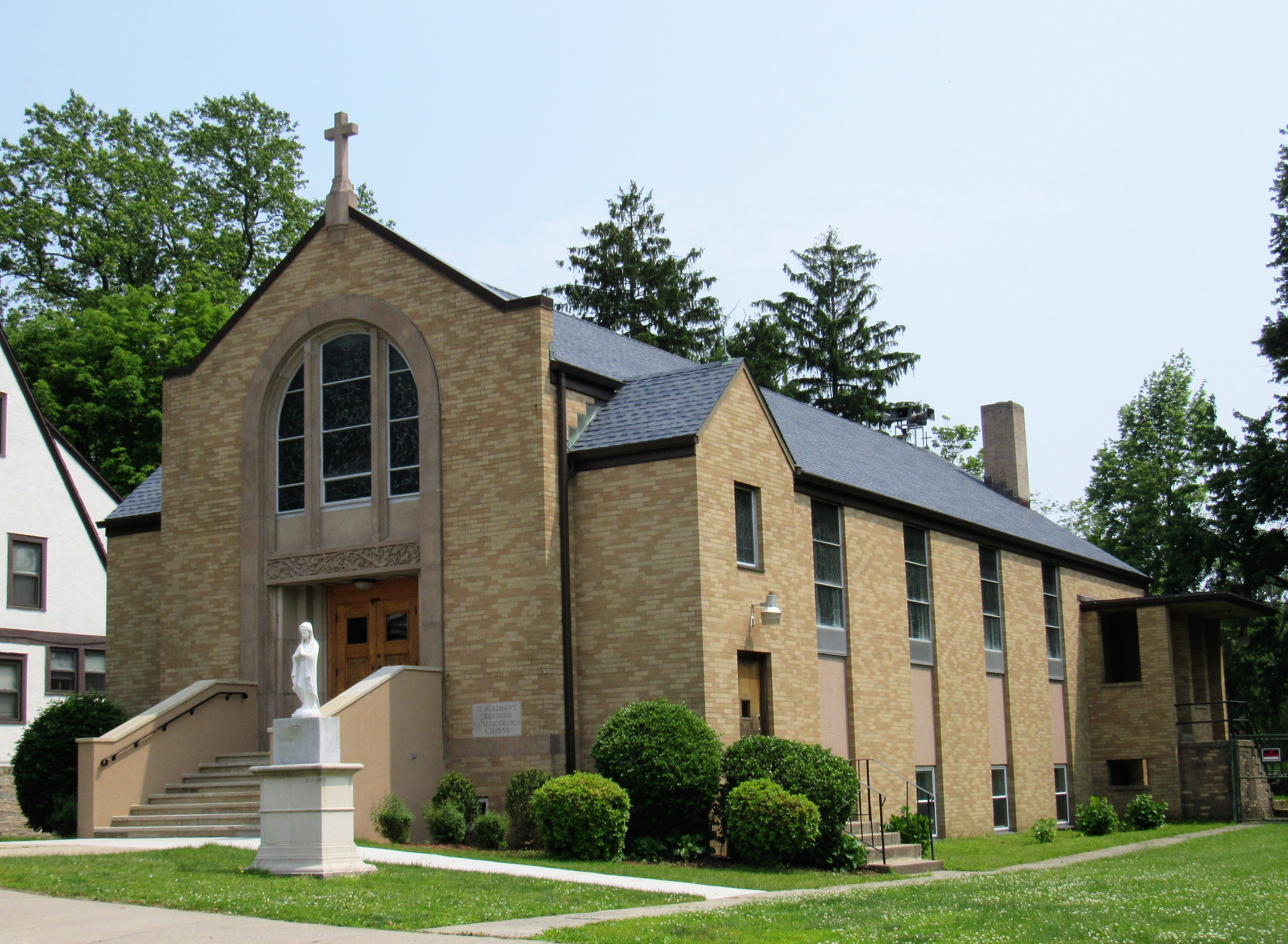
St. Vladimir's Cathedral in Stamford, Connecticut

The Ukrainian Catholic Eparchy of Stamford is a Ukrainian Greek Catholic Church ecclesiastical territory or eparchy of the Catholic Church in New York State and New England in the United States. The episcopal see is Stamford, Connecticut, where the cathedra is found in St. Volodymyr Cathedral. The diocese publishes The Sower, a monthly newsletter with articles written in both English and Ukrainian, from its offices in Stamford.

The Eparchy of Stamford is a suffragan eparchy in the ecclesiastical province of the metropolitan Archeparchy of Philadelphia.

== History ==
The Eparchy of Stamford was created in 1956 by Pope Pius XII. The territory was formerly administered by the Eparchate of Philadelphia. Bishop Ambrose Senyshyn of Stamford was named exarchate of the new eparchy. Senyshyn was president of the Ukrainian diocesan schools in Stamford, including the now-defunct St. Basil's Preparatory School.

== Diocesan bishop (eparch) ==
In early 2026 the diocesan bishop (eparch) of the diocese is Bishop Paul Patrick Chomnycky, O.S.B.M.

== St. Basil College Seminary ==
The Eparchy operates the tiny St. Basil College Seminary at 161 Glenbrook Road in Stamford. The college's mission is to educate and prepare men who desire to pursue a vocation to the priesthood for the Ukrainian Catholic Church. "St. Basil is the only Ukrainian Catholic liberal arts college, the only one of its kind outside of Ukraine fully accredited as a senior college by the State Board of Education," according to the Eparchy.

The college opened in September 1939. By 2007 it had graduated 130 students, of which 127 have been ordained to the priesthood and six elevated to the episcopacy, including Lubomyr Husar, then the Major Archbishop of the Ukrainian Greek Catholic Church.

Most of the students have been Ukrainian Catholics interested in studying spirituality, the Ukrainian rite, Ukrainian history, civilization, language, and literature. In May 2007 three students graduated. The Connecticut Department of Higher Education, in the fall of 2005, reaccredited the college for another five years. The American Academy for Liberal Education also granted "institutional pre-accreditation" in 2005.

== Preparatory school ==
The eparchy operated the St. Basil Preparatory School on the cathedral campus from 1933 to 1990. Alumni from the boys' high school typically have reunions every five years for each class. The school was founded by Archbishop Constantine Bohachevsky as "Ukrainian Catholic High School", and its alumni include more than 75 Ukrainian and Roman Catholic priests and two former Connecticut state judges.

== Metropolia of Philadelphia for the Ukrainians ==
The eparchy is one of three suffragan eparchies of the Ukrainian Catholic Metropolia of Philadelphia, which also includes the Ukrainian Catholic Archeparchy of Philadelphia, the Ukrainian Catholic Eparchy of Parma, and the Ukrainian Catholic Eparchy of Saint Nicholas of Chicago.

== Bishops ==
=== Ordinaries of this eparchy ===
- Ambrozij Andrew Senyshyn, O.S.B.M. (1956–1961), appointed Archeparch of Philadelphia
- Joseph Michael Schmondiuk (1961–1977), appointed Archeparch of Philadelphia
- Basil Harry Losten (1977–2006)
- Paul Patrick Chomnycky, O.S.B.M. (2006–Present)

=== Other priests of this eparchy who became bishops ===
- Lubomyr Husar (priest here, 1958–1972), consecrated bishop in 1977 (later a cardinal)
- Bohdan John Danylo, appointed Bishop of Saint Josaphat in Parma (Ukrainian) in 2014

== List of parish locations in the Eparchy of Stamford ==
=== Connecticut ===
St. Basil College building

- Stamford – Cathedral
- Ansonia
- Bridgeport
- Colchester
- Glastonbury
- Hartford
- New Britain
- New Haven
- Terryville
- Willimantic

=== Massachusetts ===
- Fall River
- Ludlow
- Jamaica Plain (Boston)
- Pittsfield
- Salem
- South Deerfield

=== New Hampshire ===
- Manchester

=== New York ===
- Amsterdam
- Auburn
- Bedford Hills
- Bronx
- Brooklyn – North Fifth Street
- Brooklyn – Nineteenth Street
- Buffalo
- Campbell Hall
- Cohoes
- Elmira Heights
- Fresh Meadows
- Glen Spey
- Hempstead
- Hudson
- Hunter
- Johnson City
- Kenmore
- Kerhonkson
- Lackawanna
- Lancaster
- Little Falls
- Lindenhurst
- Long Island City
- New York City – Manhattan
- Niagara Falls
- Ozone Park
- Riverhead
- Rochester – Carter Street
- Rochester – Ridge Road East
- Rome
- Spring Valley
- Staten Island
- Syracuse
- Troy
- Utica
- Watervliet
- Yonkers

=== Rhode Island ===
- Woonsocket

== See also ==
- Ukrainian Catholic National Shrine of the Holy Family
- List of the Catholic cathedrals of the United States
- List of the Catholic dioceses of the United States
- List of bishops
