= Ukrainian Catholic Archeparchy of Philadelphia =

Archeparchy in the eastern United States

Archeparchy of Philadelphia Philadelphiensis Ucrainorum Філадельфійська митрополія

Catholic
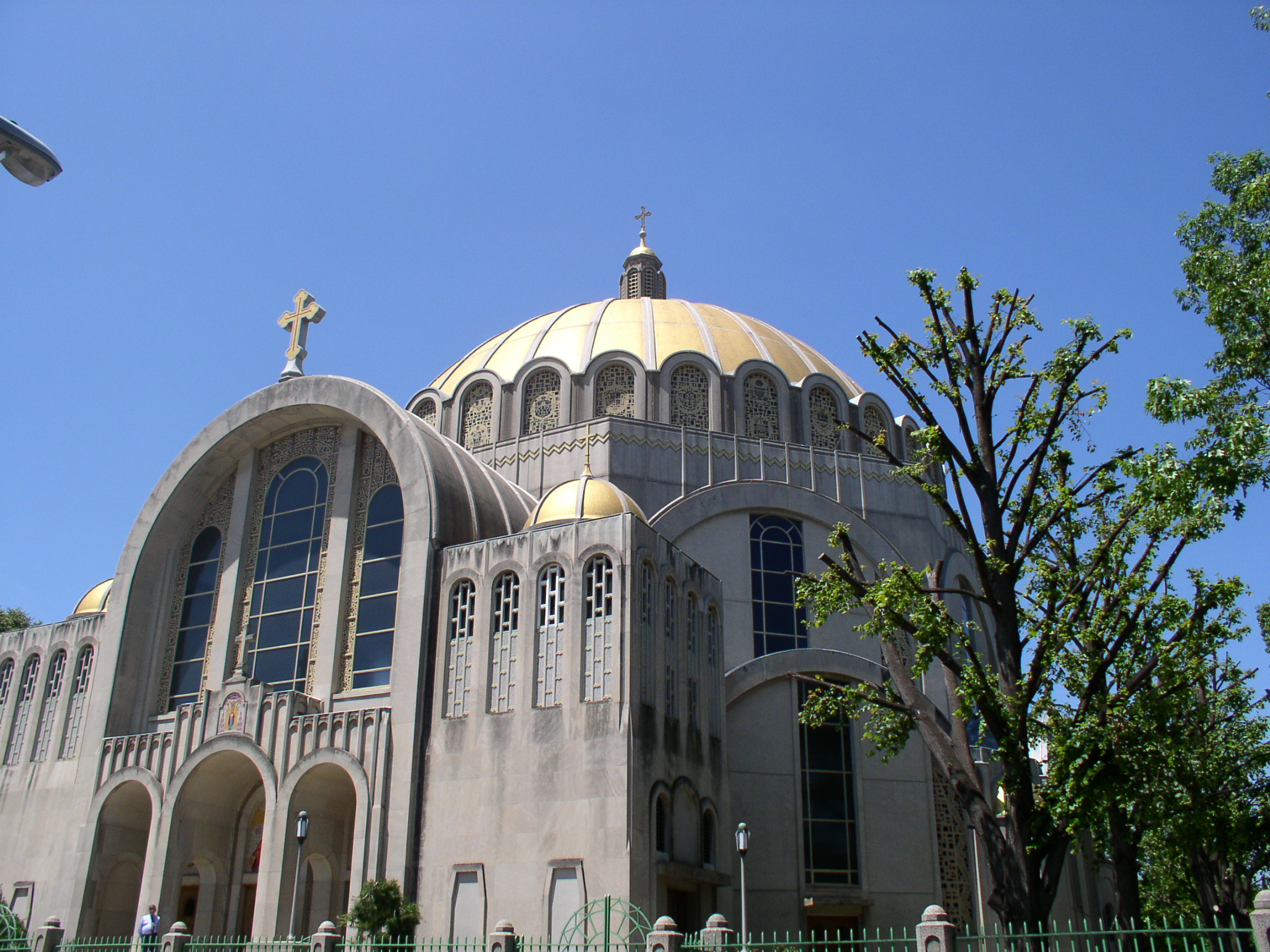
- Seat of the Archeparchy: The Ukrainian Catholic Cathedral of the Immaculate Conception, Philadelphia, Pennsylvania

Location
- Country: United States
- Territory: Eastern and Central Pennsylvania, Maryland, New Jersey, Virginia, and Washington, D.C.
- Ecclesiastical province: Ukrainian Catholic Metropolia of Philadelphia
- Headquarters: Philadelphia, Pennsylvania, United States

Statistics
- Population: 13,051
- Parishes: 64

Information
- Denomination: Catholic Church
- Sui iuris church: Ukrainian Greek Catholic Church
- Rite: Byzantine Rite
- Established: May 28, 1913; 113 years ago
- Cathedral: Ukrainian Greek Catholic Cathedral of the Immaculate Conception

Current leadership
- Pope: Leo XIV
- Major Archbishop: Sviatoslav Shevchuk
- Metropolitan Archbishop: Borys Gudziak
- Bishops emeritus: Stephen Soroka

Map
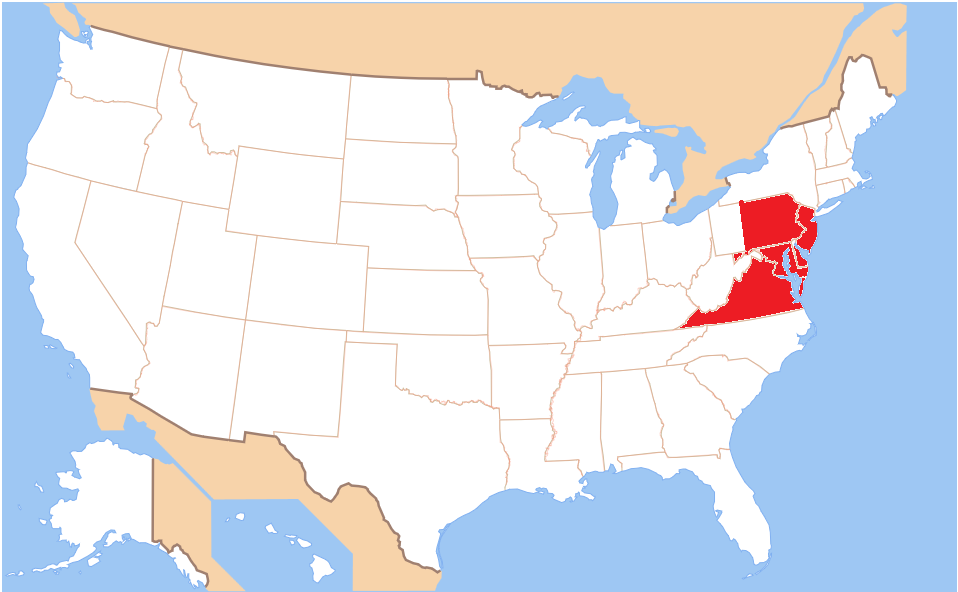
- Archeparchy of Philadelphia

Website
- ukrcatholic.org

The Ukrainian Greek Catholic Archeparchy of Philadelphia is a Ukrainian Greek Catholic Church ecclesiastical territory or archeparchy of the Catholic Church in the Eastern United States. Its episcopal see is Philadelphia, Pennsylvania. The Archeparchy of Philadelphia is a metropolitan see with three suffragan eparchies in its ecclesiastical province. The Archeparchy of Philadelphia's territorial jurisdiction includes the District of Columbia, Virginia, Maryland, New Jersey, and the eastern and central portions of Pennsylvania.

The current archbishop of the archeparchy is Borys Gudziak, installed on June 4, 2019.

Ukrainian Greek Catholics in the United States were given sui iuris status as an ordinariate for the faithful of eastern rite by Pope Pius X in 1914. Prior to that, all Ukrainian Greek Catholics had been under the jurisdiction of the local Latin Church ordinary. In 1924, the status of the ordinariate was elevated to that of exarchate, known as the Apostolic Exarchate of United States of America, Faithful of the Oriental Rite (Ukrainian). The Exarchate was then elevated to the status of Archeparchy by Pope Pius XII in 1950. In 1983, the Archeparchy lost part of its territory to the new (though still suffragan) Eparchy of Parma erected by Pope John Paul II.

As of 2016, the archeparchy has approximately 13,051 Catholics and 64 parishes under its canonical jurisdiction.

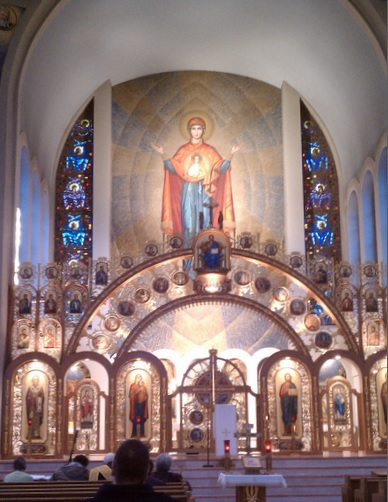
Iconostasis at the Ukrainian Cathedral of the Immaculate Conception in Philadelphia.

== Bishops ==
=== Ordinary of the United States of America ===
- Soter Stephen Ortynsky de Labetz, O.S.B.M. (1907–1916)

=== Metropolitans of Philadelphia ===
1. Constantine Bohachevsky (1924–1961)
2. Ambrozij Andrew Senyshyn, O.S.B.M. (1961–1976)
3. Joseph Michael Schmondiuk (1977–1978)
4. Myroslav Ivan Lubachivsky (1979–1980), appointed Coadjutor Archeparch and later Archeparch of Lviv (Ukrainian)
5. Stephen Sulyk (1980–2000)
6. Stephen Soroka (2000–2018)
7. Borys Gudziak (2019–present)

=== Other priests of this eparchy who became bishops ===
- Jaroslav Gabro, appointed Bishop of Saint Nicholas of Chicago in 1961
- Richard Stephen Seminack, appointed Bishop of Saint Nicholas of Chicago in 2003

== Auxiliary Eparchs of Philadelphia ==
- Ivan Bucko (1940–1945)
- Ambrozij Andrew Senyshyn, O.S.B.M. (1942–1956), appointed Eparch of Stamford
- Joseph Michael Schmondiuk (1956–1961), appointed Eparch of Stamford
- John Stock (1971–1972)
- Basil Harry Losten (1971–1977), appointed Eparch of Stamford
- Robert Mikhail Moskal (1981–1983), appointed Eparch of Parma
- Michael Kuchmiak, C.Ss.R. (1988–1989), appointed Eparch of Holy Family of London
- Wolodymyr Paska (1992–2000)
- John Bura (2006–2019)
- Andriy Rabiy (2017–2022), appointed auxiliary eparch of Ukrainian Catholic Archeparchy of Winnipeg

== Cathedral ==
The seat of the archeparchy is the Cathedral of the Immaculate Conception, built in the style of the Hagia Sophia, and located across the street from the Archeparchy's offices. In 1979, it hosted a papal visit by Pope John Paul II, the first time a Roman Pontiff had visited an Eastern Catholic church in the United States. In addition, Ukrainian President Viktor Yushchenko and his wife paid a state visit to the Archeparchy and the Cathedral in 2005.

== Metropolia of Philadelphia for the Ukrainians ==
The archeparchy is the metropolitan see of the Ukrainian Catholic Metropolia of Philadelphia. The archeparchy has three suffragan eparchies: Eparchy of Parma, Saint Nicholas of Chicago, and Stamford.

== Parishes ==
The archeparchy governs parishes in the following states:

- Delaware
- District of Columbia
- Maryland
- New Jersey
- Pennsylvania (eastern counties)
- Virginia

== See also ==
- Archdiocese of Philadelphia
- Catholic dioceses in the United States (including ecclesiastical provinces)
- Ivan Volansky – first Greek Catholic priest to serve in the United States
- List of Catholic bishops in the United States
- List of Catholic cathedrals in the United States
- List of Catholic dioceses in the United States
- Ukrainian Catholic Church
- Ukrainian Catholic National Shrine of the Holy Family

== Sources ==
- Catholic-Hierarchy.org
- History of the Archeparchy of Philadelphia (Ukrainian Catholic Archeparchy of Philadelphia official website)
- Ukrainian Catholic Cathedral of the Immaculate Conception
