= Constantine Bohachevsky =

Ukrainian archbishop

- Archeparch of Philadelphia
- Native name: Костянтин Богачевський
- Church: Ukrainian Greek Catholic Church
- Archdiocese: Archeparchy of Philadelphia
- In office: May 20, 1924 – January 6, 1961
- Predecessor: Soter Ortynsky
- Successor: Ambrose Senyshyn
- Previous posts: Titular Archbishop of Beroë (1954-1958); Titular Bishop of Amisus (1924-1954)

Orders
- Ordination: January 31, 1909 by Andrey Sheptytsky
- Consecration: June 15, 1924 by Josaphat Kotsylovsky

Personal details
- Born: June 17, 1884 Manajów, Kingdom of Galicia and Lodomeria, Cisleithania, Austria-Hungary
- Died: January 6, 1961 (aged 76) Philadelphia, Pennsylvania, United States

Constantine Bohachevsky (June 17, 1884 – January 6, 1961), born in Manaiv, Ukraine, was an archbishop of the Ukrainian Catholic Church. He was the first Ukrainian Catholic metropolitan in the United States. Among his friends was the Ukrainian Catholic nun Emellia Prokopik, who took her first vows before him, and with her congregation in Pennsylvania (the seat of the church in the US), he said he felt most at home.

Preceded by Soter Ortynsky	Ukrainian Catholic Eparch; 1924—1958	Succeeded by
Preceded by Incumbent	Ukrainian Catholic Archeparch of Philadelphia; 1958—1961	Succeeded by Ambrose Senyshyn
