= Ambrose Senyshyn =

Ambrose Senyshyn O.S.B.M.
- Archeparch of Philadelphia
- Church: Ukrainian Greek Catholic Church
- Archdiocese: Archeparchy of Philadelphia
- In office: August 14, 1961 – September 11, 1976
- Predecessor: Constantine Bohachevsky
- Successor: Joseph Michael Schmondiuk
- Previous posts: Eparch of Stamford (1958-1961); Apostolic Exarch of Stamford (1956-1958); Titular Bishop of Maina (1942-1958); Auxiliary Bishop of the Ordinariate of United States of America (1942-1956)

Personal details
- Born: February 23, 1903 Stary Sambor, Kingdom of Galicia and Lodomeria, Cisleithania, Austria-Hungary
- Died: September 11, 1976 (aged 73)

Ambrose Senyshyn, (Note: Ukrainian: Амвросій Андрій Сенишин, romanized: Amvrosii Andrii Senyshyn) O.S.B.M (February 23, 1903 – September 11, 1976) was a Ukrainian Catholic prelate who served, beginning in 1958, as Eparch of Stamford. On August 14, 1961, he was appointed Archeparch of Philadelphia.

== Notes ==
Catholic Church titles
Preceded by Incumbent	Ukrainian Catholic Eparch of Stamford; 1958–1961	Succeeded by Joseph M. Schmondiuk
Preceded by Constantine Bohachevsky	Ukrainian Catholic Archeparch of Philadelphia; 1961–1977	Succeeded by Joseph M. Schmondiuk
