= Benedict Aleksiychuk =

Ukrainian-American Eastern Catholic bishop

His Grace, The Most Reverend, Vladyka Venedykt Aleksiychuk MSU
- Eparch of Ukrainian Catholic Eparchy of Chicago
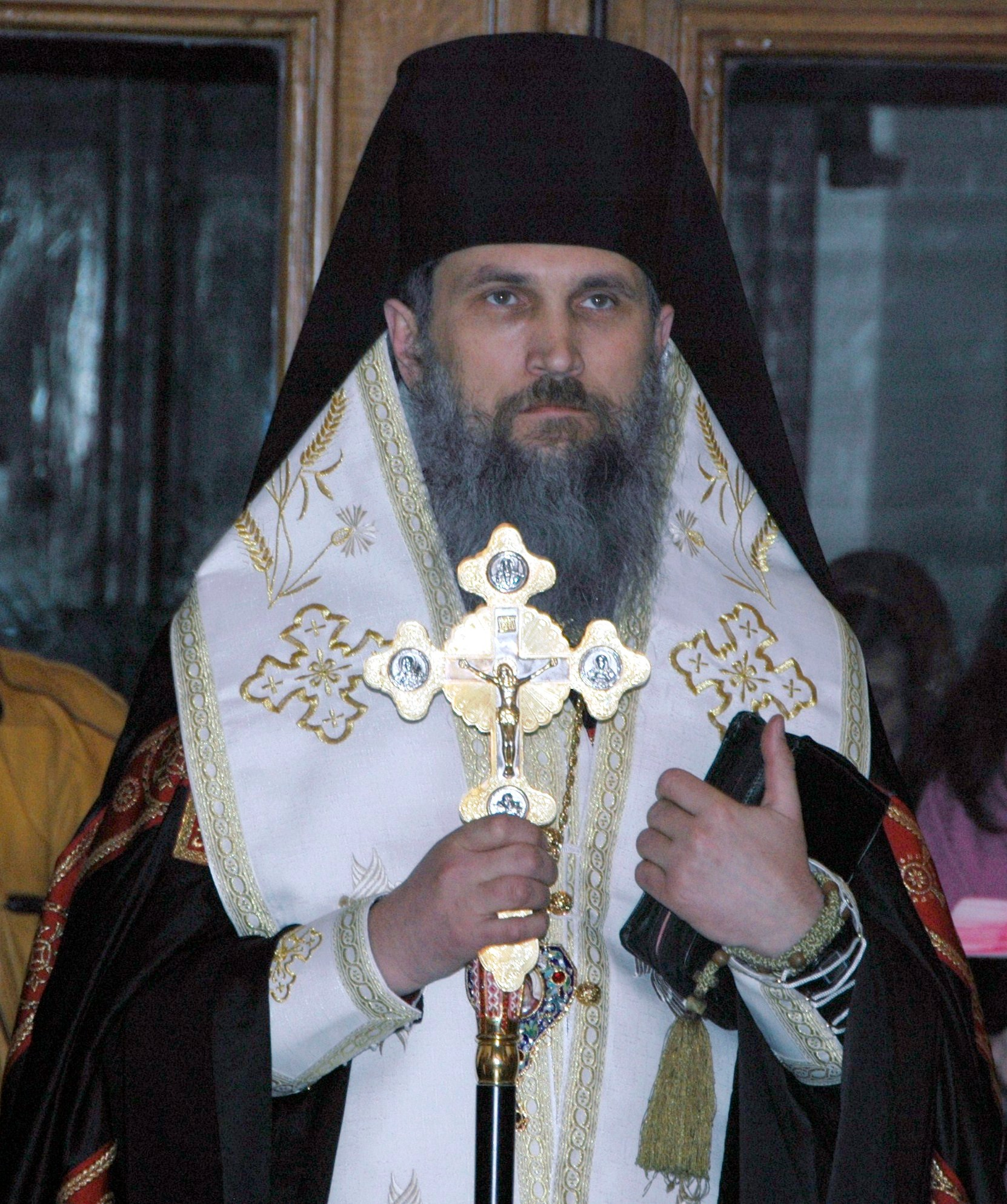
- Church: Ukrainian Greek Catholic Church
- Metropolis: Philadelphia
- Diocese: Chicago
- Appointed: April 20, 2017
- Installed: June 29, 2017
- Predecessor: Richard Seminack
- Previous posts: Hegumen of Univ Lavra of the Studite Rite (1999–2010); Auxiliary Bishop of Lviv and Titular Bishop of Germaniciana (2010–2017)

Orders
- Ordination: October 9, 1991 (deacon) by Philemon Kurchaba; March 29, 1992 (priest) by Myroslav Lubachivsky
- Consecration: September 5, 2010 by Ihor Vozniak, Yulian Voronovskyi and Paul Chomnycky

Personal details
- Born: Valeriy Dmytrovych Aleksiychuk; January 16, 1968 (age 58) Borshchivka, Rivne Oblast, Ukrainian SSR, Soviet Union
- Motto: Возлюбимъ другъ друга ("Let us love one another")

Styles of Venedykt Aleksiychuk
- Reference style: His Grace; The Most Reverend
- Spoken style: His Grace
- Religious style: Bishop

Bishop Benedict (Note: Ukrainian: Венедикт, lit. 'Venedykt') MSU (born Valerii Dmytrovych Aleksiychuk, (Note: Ukrainian: Вале́рій Дми́трович Алексійчу́к) January 16, 1968) is a prelate and monk of the Ukrainian Greek Catholic Church who has been the bishop of the Ukrainian Catholic Eparchy of Chicago since 2017. He was previously the hegumen of the Univ Lavra of the Studite Rule from 1999 to 2010, when he was consecrated bishop and appointed as auxiliary bishop of the Ukrainian Catholic Archeparchy of Lviv until 2017.

== Biography ==
Valerii Aleksiychuk (also spelled Valery) was born on January 16, 1968 in Broshchivka, Rivne Oblast, Soviet Union. He graduated from Rivne medical college in 1987 and worked as a physician's assistant for several years. He also spent two years in the Soviet military, before attending the seminary in Drohobych. Aleksiychuk was ordained as a deacon in Drohobych by Philemon Kurchaba on October 9, 1991, and ordained as a priest by Myroslav Lubachivsky on March 29, 1992, at St. George's Cathedral, Lviv.

From 1992 to 1994 he did missionary work in eastern Ukraine and Belarus, before becoming a professed member of the Ukrainian Studite Monks on December 31, 1995, taking the name Benedict (also spelled Venedykt). In 1996, he earned a Master of Theology degree from John Paul II Catholic University of Lublin. That year he was sent to work at the Ukrainian Catholic Eparchy of Toronto, where he intended to establish a monastery in St. Catharines, Canada. Benedict returned to Ukraine in 1999 and became the hegumen of the Univ Lavra of the Studite Monks. He was reelected as hegumen for another two terms, until 2010. He completed a licentiate and a doctorate in 2006 and 2008, respectively, at the Lublin Catholic University.

On August 3, 2010, Lyubomyr Huzar, Major Archbishop of Kyiv-Galicia, by general consent of the Synod of Bishops of the UGCC, appointed hieromonk Benedict Aleksiychuk bishop-auxiliary of Lviv Archeparchy. He was consecrated as a bishop on September 5, 2010, at St. George's Cathedral in Lviv. In that role he also served as chief of staff of the archeparchial curia, and led the Church's liturgical commission and synodal committee on liturgy. In June 2016 he received a Master of Business Administration degree from the Ukrainian Catholic University.

On April 20, 2017, Pope Francis named Benedict to become the Bishop of the Ukrainian Catholic Eparchy of Chicago. He was to be the successor of Richard Seminack, who died in August 2016. Benedict was enthroned on June 29, 2017.

== See also ==
- Catholic Church hierarchy
- Catholic Church in the United States
- Historical list of the Catholic bishops of the United States
- List of Catholic bishops of the United States

Catholic Church titles
Preceded by Sebastian Dmytrukh	Hegumen of the Univ Lavra of the Studite Rite; 1999–2010	Succeeded by Teodor Martynyuk
Vacant Title last held by Ihor Vozniak	Ukrainian Catholic Auxiliary Bishop of Lviv; 2010–2017	Succeeded by Volodymyr Hrutsa
Preceded by Rafael Sanus Abad	Titular Bishop of Germaniciana; 2010–2017	Succeeded by Andriy Rabiy
Preceded by Richard Seminack	Ukrainian Catholic Bishop of Chicago; 2017–present	Incumbent
