= List of cathedrals in Illinois =

This is a list of cathedrals in the state of Illinois, United States:

| Municipality | Cathedral | Image | Location & References |
|---|---|---|---|
| Belleville | St. Peter's Cathedral (Roman Catholic) | | 38°30′37″N 89°59′16″W |
| Bellwood (Chicago area) | Mar Thoma Shleeha Cathedral (Syro-Malabar Catholic) | | 41°53′21″N 87°53′40″W |
| Bellwood (Chicago area) | Saint Gregorios Cathedral (Malankara Orthodox Church) (Oriental Orthodox Communion) | | 41°53′13″N 87°51′58″W |
| Chicago | Holy Name Cathedral (Roman Catholic) | | 41°53′46″N 87°37′40″W |
| Chicago | St. James Cathedral (Episcopal) | | 41°53′41″N 87°37′36″W |
| Chicago | Annunciation Cathedral (Greek Orthodox) | | 41°54′04″N 87°37′57″W |
| Chicago | St. Nicholas Cathedral (Ukrainian Catholic) | | 41°53′49″N 87°41′02″W |
| Chicago | Holy Trinity Cathedral (Orthodox Church in America) | | 41°54′07″N 87°40′55″W |
| Chicago | St. George Cathedral (Orthodox Church in America) | | 41°53′54″N 87°40′19″W |
| Chicago | Holy Resurrection Cathedral (Serbian Orthodox) | | 41°59′01″N 87°49′40″W |
| Chicago | Ss. Constantine and Helen Orthodox Cathedral (Romanian Orthodox) | | 41°58′44″N 87°48′00″W |
| Chicago | Mar Gewargis (St. George) Cathedral (Assyrian Church of the East) | | 42°00′47″N 87°40′11″W |
| Chicago | St. Volodymyr Cathedral (Ukrainian Orthodox Church of the USA) | | 41°54′02″N 87°41′03″W |
| Chicago | All Saints Cathedral (Polish National Catholic Church) (not in full communion with Rome) | | 41°59′17″N 87°51′12″W |
| Des Plaines (Chicago area) | Holy Virgin Protection Cathedral (Russian Orthodox Church Outside Russia) | | 42°01′11″N 87°53′44″W |
| Joliet | Cathedral of St. Raymond Nonnatus (Roman Catholic) | | 41°32′06″N 88°06′04″W |
| Peoria | Cathedral of Saint Mary of the Immaculate Conception (Roman Catholic) | | 40°41′55″N 89°35′06″W |
| Quincy | St. John's Cathedral (Anglican Catholic Church) | | 39°53′48″N 91°21′20″W |
| Quincy | St. John's Cathedral (Anglican Church in North America) | | 39°56′01″N 91°24′16″W |
| Rockford | Cathedral of St. Peter (Roman Catholic) | | 42°17′06″N 89°04′58″W |
| Springfield | Cathedral of the Immaculate Conception (Roman Catholic) | | 39°47′36″N 89°38′55″W |
| Springfield | Cathedral Church of St. Paul (Episcopal) | | 39°47′37″N 89°39′13″W |
| Wheaton (Chicago area) | Church of the Resurrection (Anglican Church in North America) | | 41°52′08″S 88°07′16″W |

== See also ==
- List of cathedrals in the United States
