= Saint Demetrios Hellenic Church Hammond Indiana =

Church in Hammond, Indiana

Coordinates: 41.585851°N 87.521435°W

Saint Demetrios Greek Orthodox Church is a church in Hammond, Indiana. It is part of the Greek Orthodox Metropolis of Chicago, within the Greek Orthodox Archdiocese of America.
