= Richard Seminack =

American bishop

Most Reverend Richard Stephen Seminack
- Eparch of Saint Nicholas of Chicago
- Church: Ukrainian Greek Catholic Church
- Appointed: March 25, 2003
- In office: June 4, 2003 – August 16, 2016
- Predecessor: Michael Wiwchar, C.Ss.R.
- Successor: Venedykt Aleksiychuk, M.S.U.

Orders
- Ordination: May 25, 1967 by Ambrozij Andrew Senyshyn, O.S.B.M.
- Consecration: June 4, 2003 by Lubomyr Husar, M.S.U.

Personal details
- Born: March 3, 1942 Philadelphia, Pennsylvania, USA
- Died: August 16, 2016 (aged 74) Hoffman Estates, Illinois, USA

Richard Stephen Seminack (March 3, 1942 – August 16, 2016) was an American bishop of the Catholic Church. He served as the fourth eparch (bishop) of the Ukrainian Catholic Eparchy of Saint Nicholas of Chicago since 2003.

== Biography ==
Richard Seminack was born in Philadelphia, Pennsylvania to Raymond and Anna (Cwiek) Seminack. He was the oldest of seven children. He was educated at St. Martin of Tours Elementary School and Father Judge High School in Philadelphia. After attending seminary he was ordained a priest for the Archeparchy of Philadelphia on May 25, 1967 by Archbishop Ambrozij Andrew Senyshyn, O.S.B.M.

Pope John Paul II named Seminack as the eparch of St. Nicholas of Chicago on March 25, 2003. He was ordained a bishop by Cardinal Lubomyr Husar, M.S.U., the Major Archbishop of Lviv on June 4, 2003. The principal co-consecrators were Archbishop Stephen Soroka of Philadelphia and Bishop Robert Mikhail Moskal of Parma.

He died from cancer in Hoffman Estates, Illinois on August 16, 2016.
