= Nykanor Deyneha =

Ukrainian Greek Catholic bishop (1907–1982)

- Ukrainian Catholic Archeparchy of Lviv (auxiliary)
- Church: Ukrainian Greek Catholic Church
- Appointed: February 1972
- Other post: Archimandrite of Univ Lavra of the Studite Rite (1951-1982)

Orders
- Ordination: 29 October 1939 (Hieromonk) by Andrey Sheptytsky
- Consecration: February 1972 (Bishop) by Vasyl Velychkovsky

Personal details
- Born: Mykola Petrovych Deyneha; 8 December 1907 Svystilnyky, Austrian-Hungarian Empire, now Ukraine
- Died: 7 November 1982 (aged 74) Lviv, Soviet Union, now Ukraine
- Buried: Yaniv Cemetery, Lviv

Bishop Nykanor Deyneha (Ukrainian: Никанор Дейнега; 8 December 1907 – 8 November 1982) was the clandestine Ukrainian Auxiliary bishop of Lviv of the Ukrainian Greek Catholic Church. Also he was leader of the Studite Brethren as the clandestine Archimandrite of the Univ Lavra during the time of the religion persecution in the Soviet Union. In addition, bishop Nykanor was a Nazi prisoner from 1942 to 1943.

== Life ==
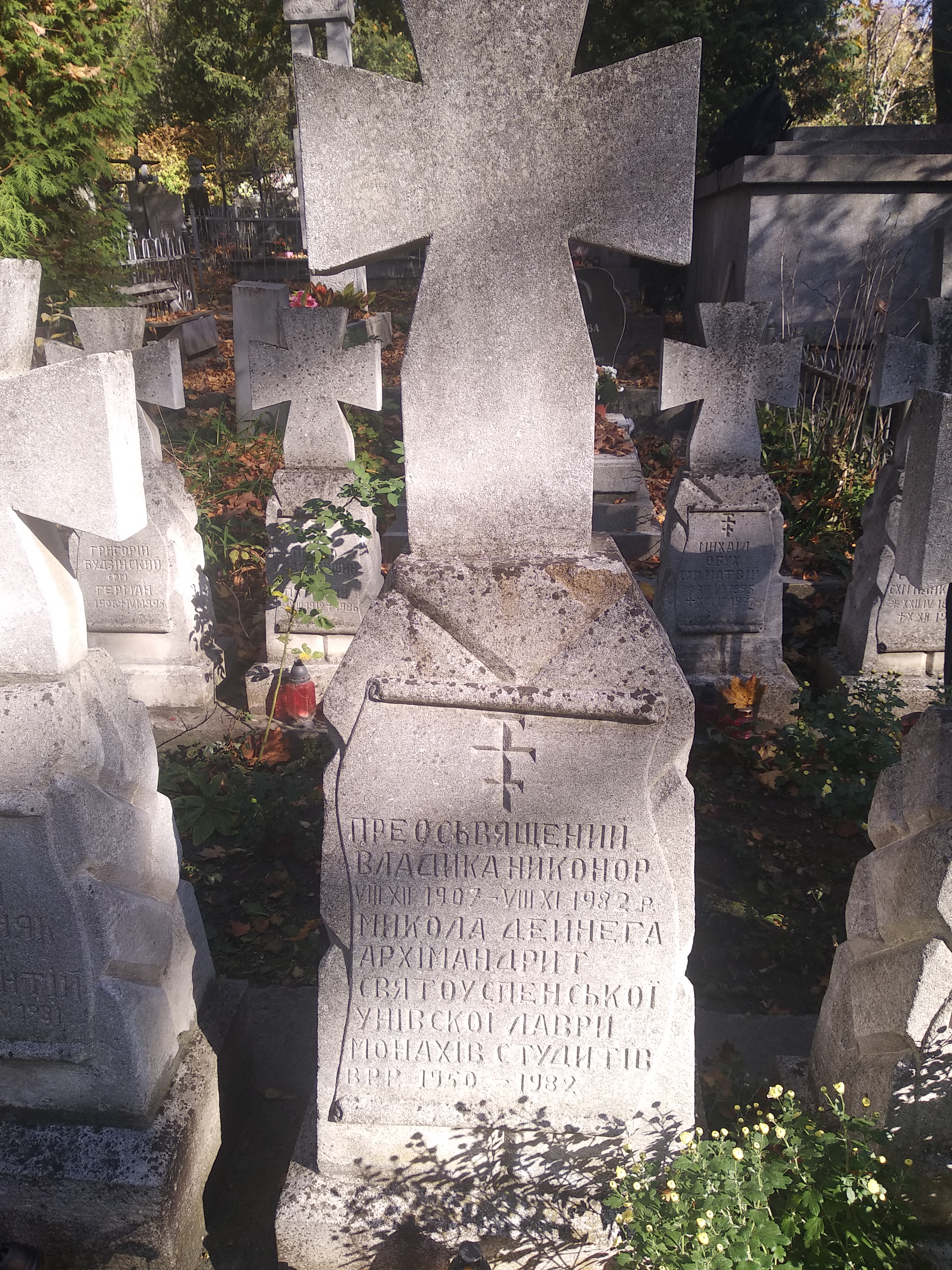
the Bishop's Deyneha grave at the Yaniv cemetery in Lviv

Bishop Nykanor (his given name was Mykola; Nykanor is his monastic name) was born in Svystilnyky village (now is Svitanok village, Ivano-Frankivsk Raion, Ivano-Frankivsk Oblast) into a peasant family. After graduation from the school, he joined the Studite Brethren in the end of 1934 as a novice on 16 June 1935 was tonsured as a monk in the Univ Lavra. On 15 July 1938, he had last monastic vows. Next year he was ordained as hierodeacon (1 October 1939) and hieromonk (29 October 1939), after successful graduation from the Lviv Theological Seminary, and in 1943 was appointed as superior in St. Joseph Lviv filial monastery.

Before this time, on 11 December 1942, he was arrested and imprisoned by Nazis for "anti-Nazi activities". However, six months later he was released, because the Nazis did not know that the Jews hid in the monastery.

In 1951, when in Vladimir Central Prison died as a martyr of the faith previous Archimandrite, Father Klymentiy Sheptytsky, Nykanor was elected as his successor. During this time he clandestinely organized the catacomb theologian seminary.

In February 1972 he was consecrated as auxiliary bishop for underground Ukrainian Catholic Archeparchy of Lviv by Blessed Bishop Vasyl Velychkovsky, that in this time was the Administrator for all the Ukrainian Greek Catholic Church in catacombs.

Catholic Church titles
Preceded by Klymentiy Sheptytsky	Archimandrite of Univ Holy Dormition Lavra of the Studite Rite; 1951–1982	Succeeded by Yuriy Makar
