= Diocese of Chicago =

Diocese of Chicago may refer to:

Catholic

- Roman Catholic Archdiocese of Chicago
- St. Thomas Syro-Malabar Catholic Diocese of Chicago
- Ukrainian Catholic Eparchy of Chicago

Orthodox

- Diocese of Chicago and Mid-America (ROCOR)
- Metropolis of Chicago (Patriarchate of Constantinople)
- Orthodox Church in America Diocese of the Midwest (cathedra in Chicago)

Anglican

- Episcopal Diocese of Chicago

Lutheran

- Metropolitan Chicago Synod
