= Thimotheos Haloftis =

Greek Orthodox bishop (b. 1917)

His Eminence Timotheos
- Metropolitan of Chicago
- Archdiocese: America
- See: Chicago
- Installed: 1967
- Term ended: 1977
- Predecessor: Aimilianos (Laloussis)
- Successor: Iakovos (Garmatis)
- Other post: Bishop of Rodostolou

Orders
- Ordination: 1936
- Consecration: April 22, 1962

Personal details
- Born: Alkiviadis Haloftis; September 10, 1917 Megara, Attika, Greece
- Died: December 21, 1977 (aged 60)
- Denomination: Greek Orthodox
- Education: Theological School of Athens; Hellenic College Holy Cross; Catholic University of Paris

Metropolitan Thimotheos Haloftis, secular name Alkiviadis Haloftis (Greek: Αλκιβιάδης Χαλόφτης; September 10, 1917 - December 21, 1977) was an Orthodox bishop and a former Metropolitan of Chicago from 1967 to 1977.

== Biography ==
Haloftis was born Alkiviadis Haloftis on September 10, 1917, in Megara, Greece. He was ordained a deacon and a priest in 1936, and graduated from the Theological School of Athens in 1939. During the World War II he served as a military priest. After the war he was a pastor in Kypseli from 1949 to 1956, while also obtaining his master's in Theology at the Catholic University of Paris in 1951. He first arrived in North America in 1956, where he served as a pastor in Winnipeg. The following year he was transferred to New York where he presided over until April 1962, when he was consecrated as the titular bishop of Rodostolou, and served as vicar and auxiliary bishop to the Archdiocese of America. From 1962 to 1963 he served in Buenos Aires, and in Canada from 1963 to 1967. He was consecrated as metropolitan of Chicago in 1967, where he served until his unexpected death in 1977.

== Sources ==
- Charalambidis, Stylianos (2022). Karakoulakis, Eudokimos (ed.). The Hierarchs of the Past Century (1922-2022) (in Greek and English). Thessaloniki: University of Thessaloniki.
- United States Congress (1968). Congressional Record: Proceedings and Debates of the ... Congress. Washington, D.C.: U.S. Government Printing Office.

Eastern Orthodox Church titles
Preceded by Aimilianos (Laloussis)	Metropolitan of Chicago; 1967 – 1977	Succeeded by Iakovos (Garmatis)
