= Iakovos Garmatis =

20th and 21st-century Greek Orthodox bishop and theologian

His Eminence Iakovos
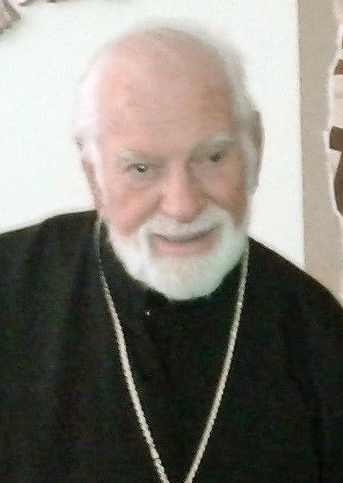
- Diocese: Chicago
- Term ended: June 2, 2017
- Predecessor: Timotheos
- Successor: Nathanael Symeonides

Orders
- Consecration: December 25, 1969

Personal details
- Born: Michael Garmatis; April 4, 1928 Athens, Greece
- Died: June 2, 2017 (aged 89) Chicago, Illinois, U.S.
- Denomination: Eastern Orthodox Church
- Profession: Theologian

Metropolitan Iakovos of Chicago (secular name Michael Garmatis, Greek: Μιχαήλ Γκαρμάτης; April 4, 1928 – June 2, 2017) was Metropolitan of Chicago under the Ecumenical Patriarchate of Constantinople until his death on June 2, 2017.

== Biography ==
Garmatis began his higher education in Athens, Greece, and continued his studies and service in the Boston area. He was appointed Archdiocesan Vicar of the Diocese of Detroit by Archbishop Iakovos in February 1968. One year later, he was elevated to the rank of Bishop by the Holy See of Constantinople. He was consecrated Bishop of Apameia (an Auxiliary Bishop of Archbishop Iakovos) on Christmas Day of 1969, and appointed to the Diocese of Detroit as Bishop of that district.

In 1971 Garmatis was appointed President of Hellenic College and Holy Cross School of Theology in Brookline, Massachusetts, while remaining as administrative overseer of the Diocese of Detroit. He simultaneously served as the Bishop of the New England area during his five-year tenure as President of Hellenic College and Holy Cross School of Theology.

Garmatis was elected to the episcopacy of the Greek Orthodox Church by the Holy and Sacred Synod of the Ecumenical Patriarchate of Constantinople in 1969. He was enthroned by Archbishop Iakovos of the Greek Orthodox Archdiocese of North and South America on May 1, 1979, as the Bishop of Chicago at the Annunciation Cathedral. In November 1997, the Holy Synod of the Ecumenical Patriarchate elected Garmatis to the active Metropolitanate of Chicago and Exarch of Ionia. In this capacity, he served the Greek Orthodox Metropolis of Chicago as its Presiding Hierarch (proedros).

The Diocese of Chicago consists of 34 parishes in Illinois, with another 24 parishes in Wisconsin, Minnesota, Iowa, northern Indiana, and eastern Missouri. The general offices of the Greek Orthodox Metropolis of Chicago are located in Chicago, Illinois.

Under Garmatis' leadership the diocese has increased its efforts to assist the homeless and those in need, as witnessed in the labors of the Diocesan Philanthropy Committee. He has founded new youth programs and established various local dialogue commissions with other faith communities.

Garmatis also established the Bishop Iakovos Scholarship Assistance Program, the Bishop's Task Force on AIDS, the Diocese Junior Olympics, the Diocese Dance Festival, as well as numerous programs in religion and Greek education.

Garmatis died on June 2, 2017, at the Louis A. Weiss Memorial Hospital in Chicago following surgical complications at the age of 89.

== Sources ==
- Metropolitan Iakovos of Chicago from the Greek Orthodox Metropolis of Chicago
- Metropolitan Iakovos of Chicago Falls Asleep in the Lord from the Greek Orthodox Archdiocese of America

Eastern Orthodox Church titles
Preceded by Thimotheos (Haloftis)	Metropolitan of Chicago; 1979 – 2018	Succeeded by Nathanael (Symeonides)
