= Annunciation Greek Orthodox Cathedral (Chicago) =

Cathedral in Chicago, Illinois

Coordinates: 41.901162°N 87.632355°W

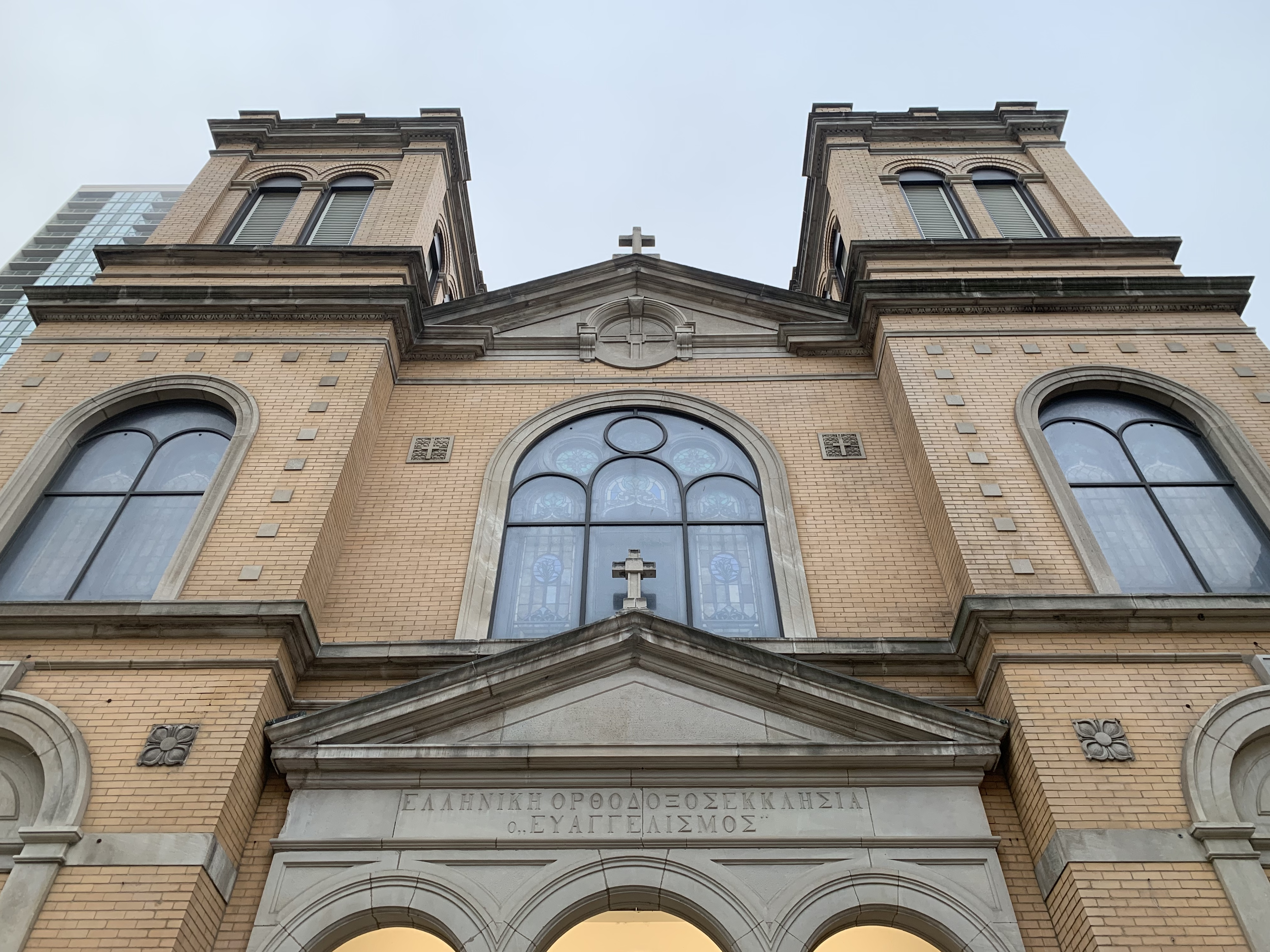
- The Annunciation Cathedral
- Annunciation Greek Orthodox Cathedral
- Location: 1017 N La Salle Dr, Chicago, Illinois
- Country: United States
- Denomination: Greek Orthodox Church
- Website: https://annunciationcathedralchicago.org/

Architecture
- Functional status: Active
- Architectural type: Cathedral
- Style: Byzantine
- Completed: 1910
- Construction cost: $100,000 ($3,500,000 in current dollar terms)

Administration
- Metropolis: Metropolis of Chicago
- Archdiocese: Archdiocese of America

Clergy
- Archbishop: Nathanael (Symeonides)
- Dean: V. Rev. Archimandrite Nephon Tsimalis

The Annunciation Greek Orthodox Cathedral is a Greek Orthodox cathedral located in Chicago, Illinois. It is the mother church of the Metropolis of Chicago, and serves as the episcopal seat of the Metropolitan of Chicago. The current membership includes some 400 families.

== History ==
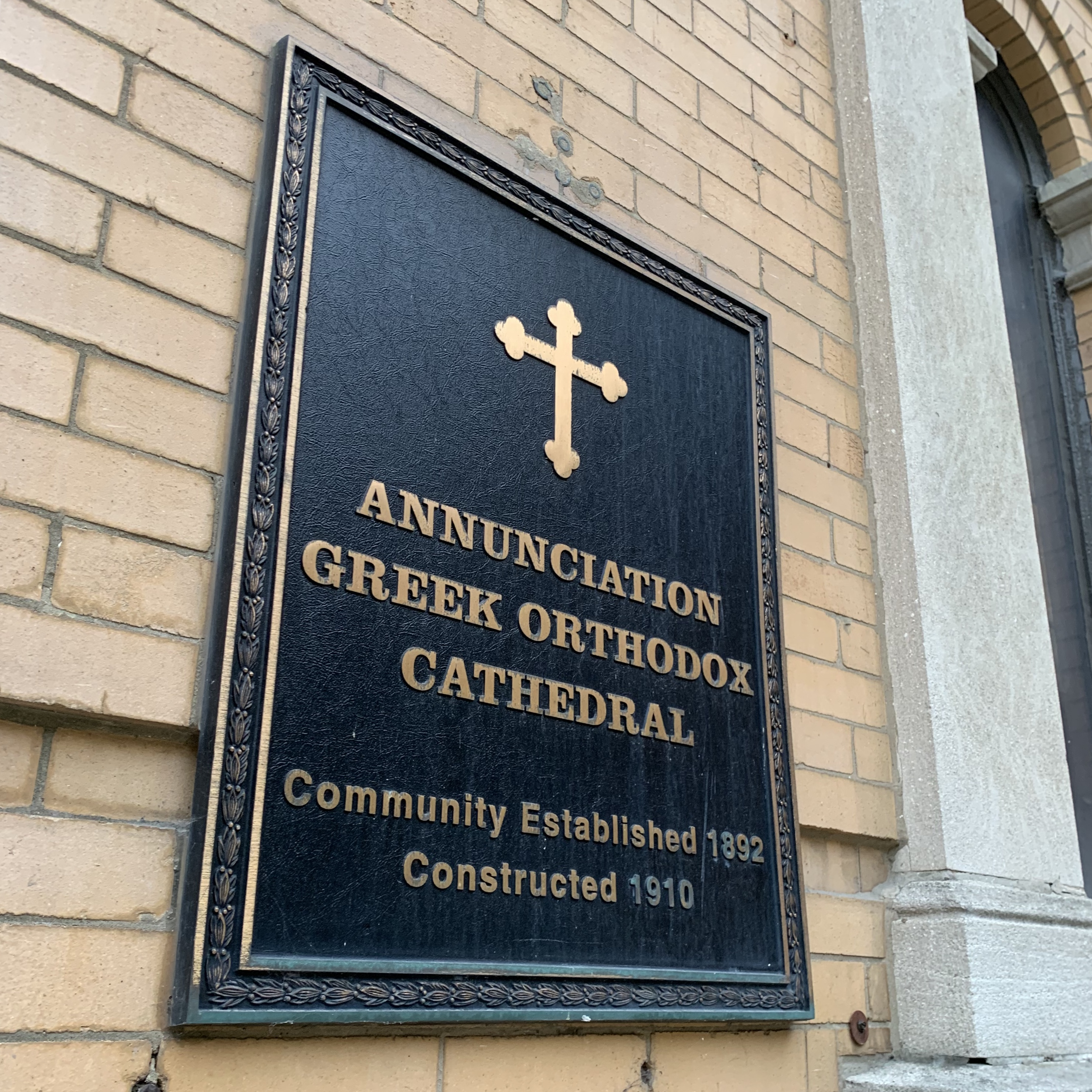
Plaque of the cathedral.

The Annunciation Greek Orthodox Cathedral was established in 1892 by a Greek immigrant community from Laconia and the Greek Islands. In 1909, the Greek Orthodox community paid $18,000 for the lot of city land on which the cathedral stands today.

In 1910, the cathedral was complete with a total cost of around $100,000. It was built after an Athenian cathedral and is currently the oldest surviving Chicago building in the style of a Byzantine church.

The burden of the Great Depression prompted the Greek Orthodox community to rally together and save the churches from financial ruin through various fundraising activities. Also in this era, the entire building was raised from its foundation and moved back to accommodate for the widening of LaSalle Street.

== Gallery ==
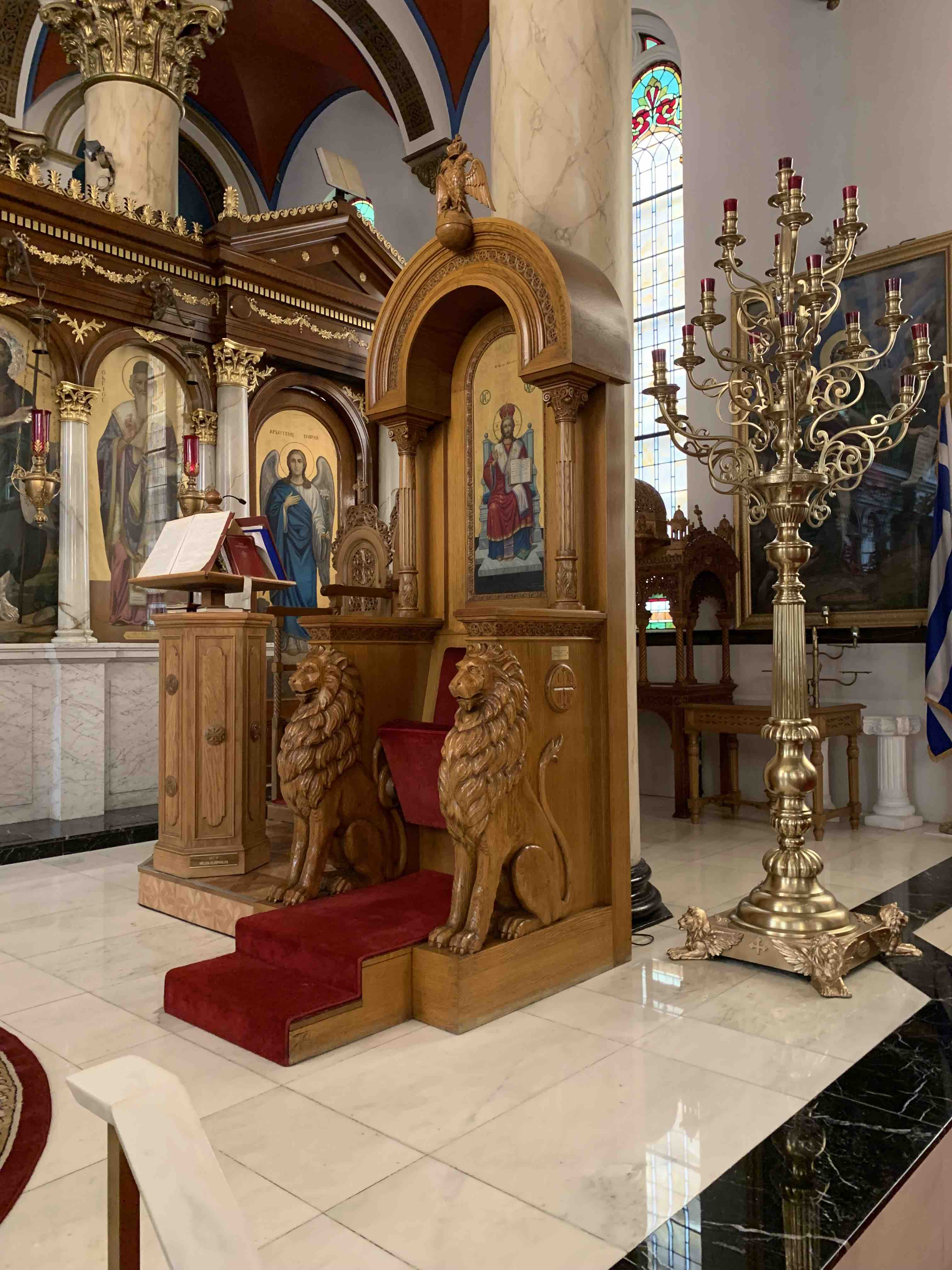
Bishop's seat

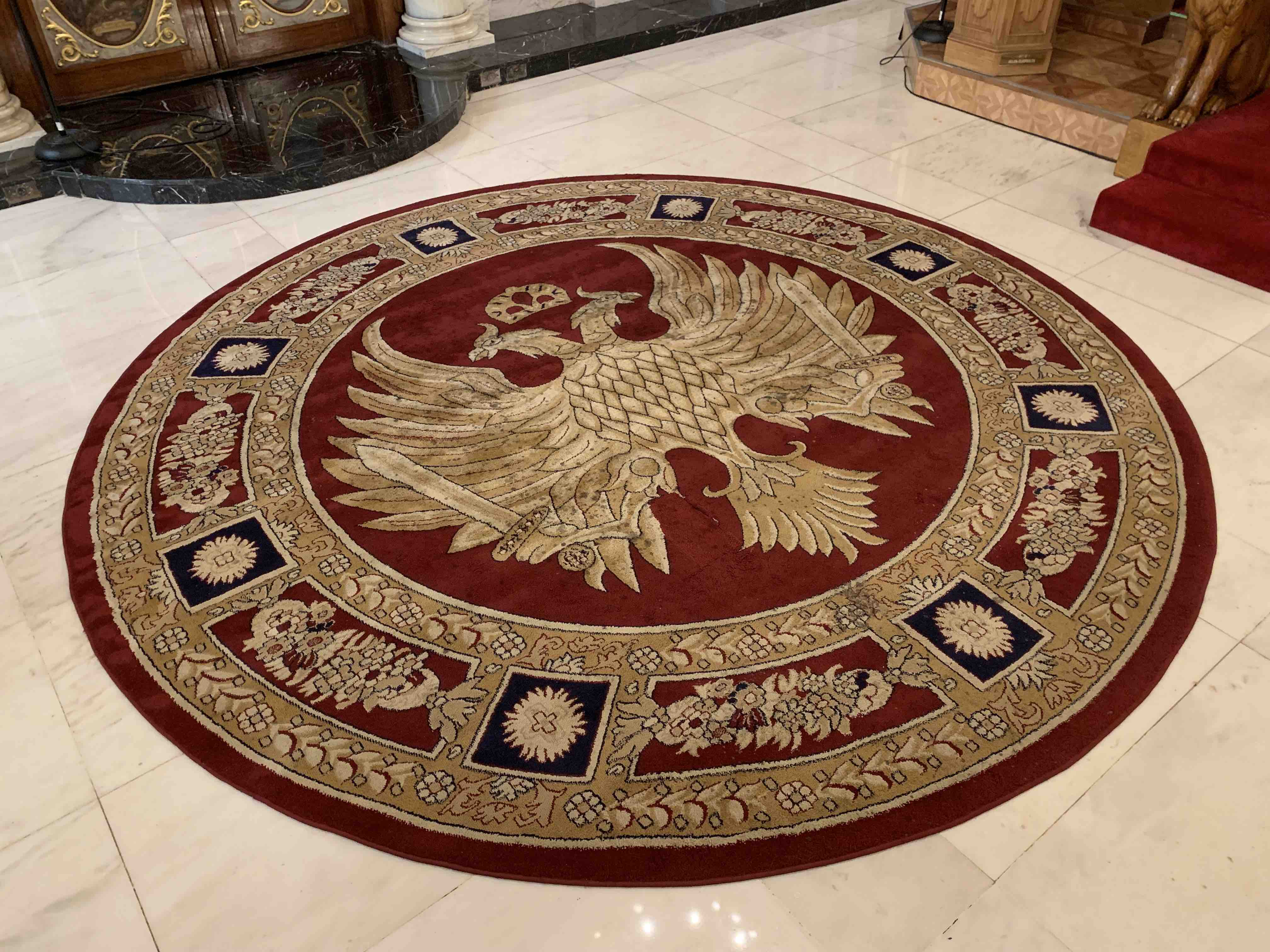
Byzantine Eagle

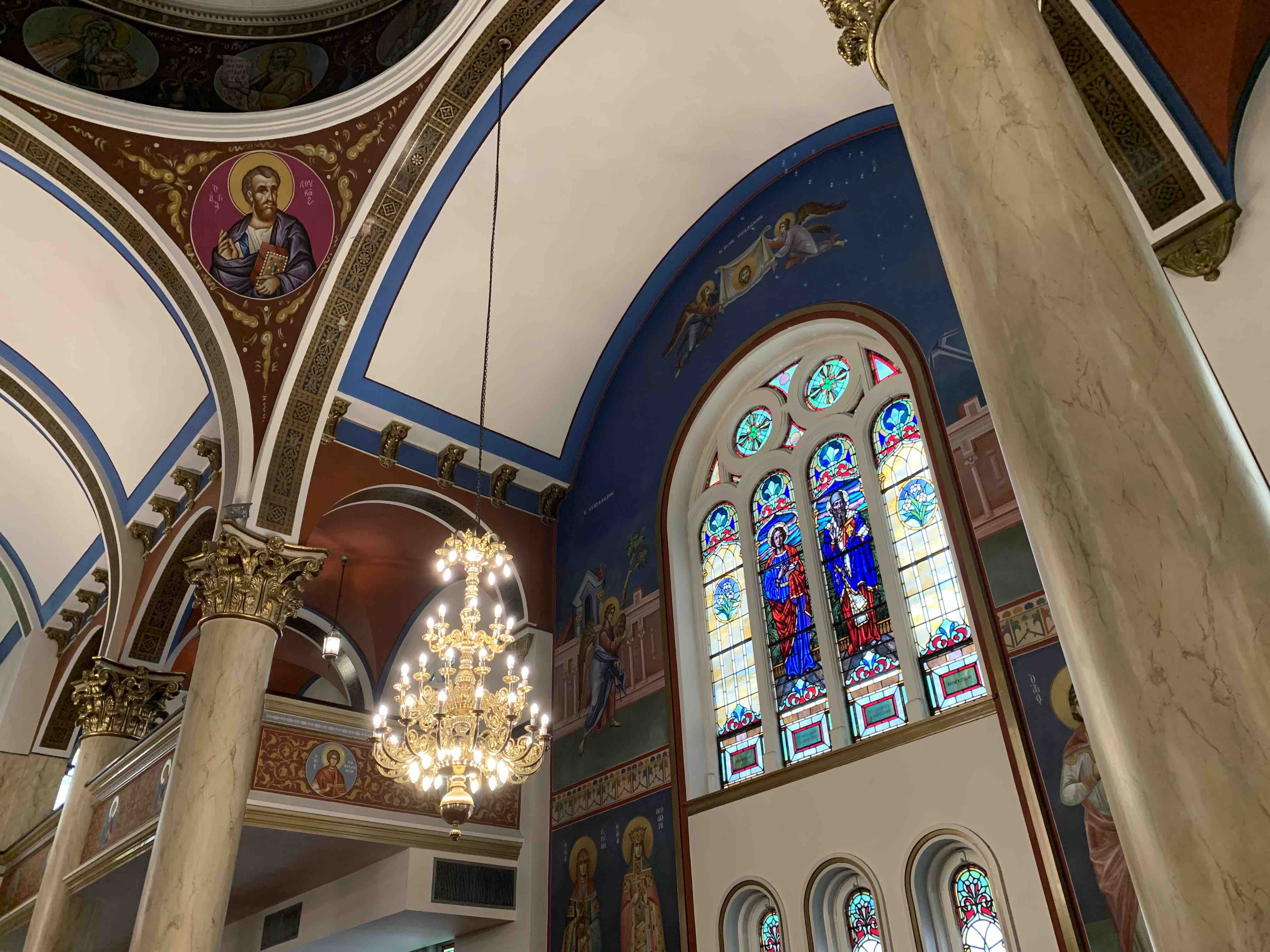

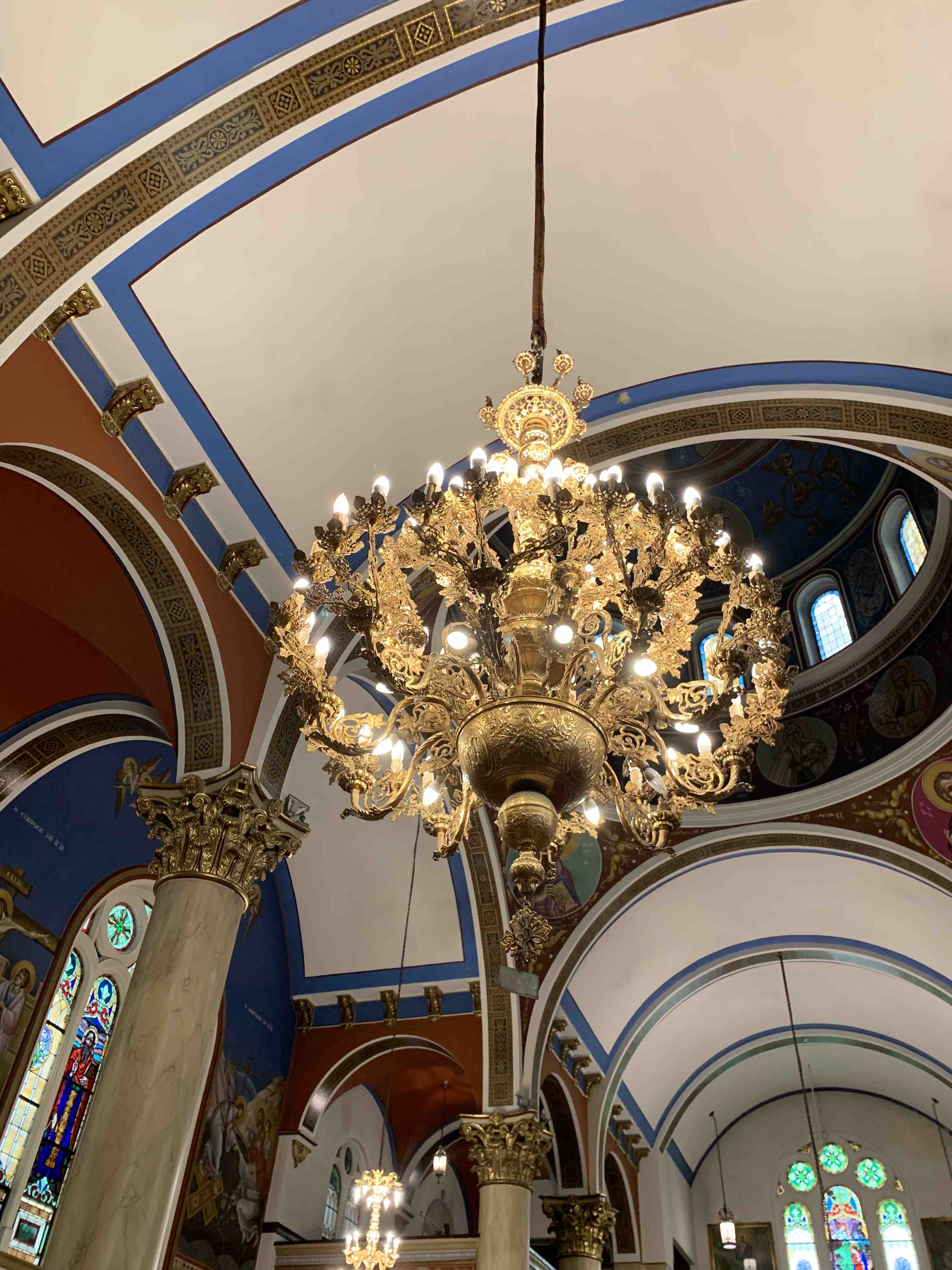

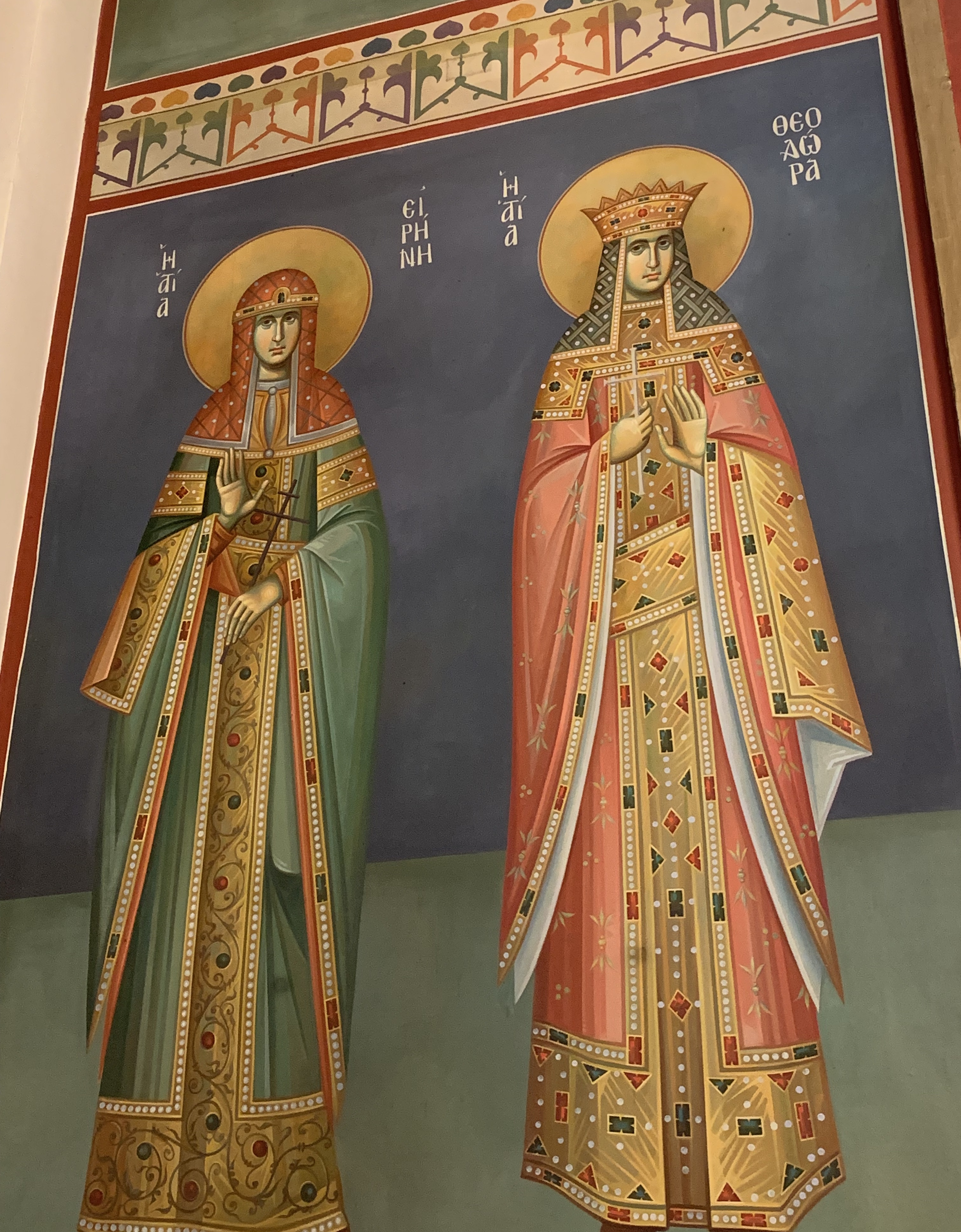
Saints Irene and Theodora

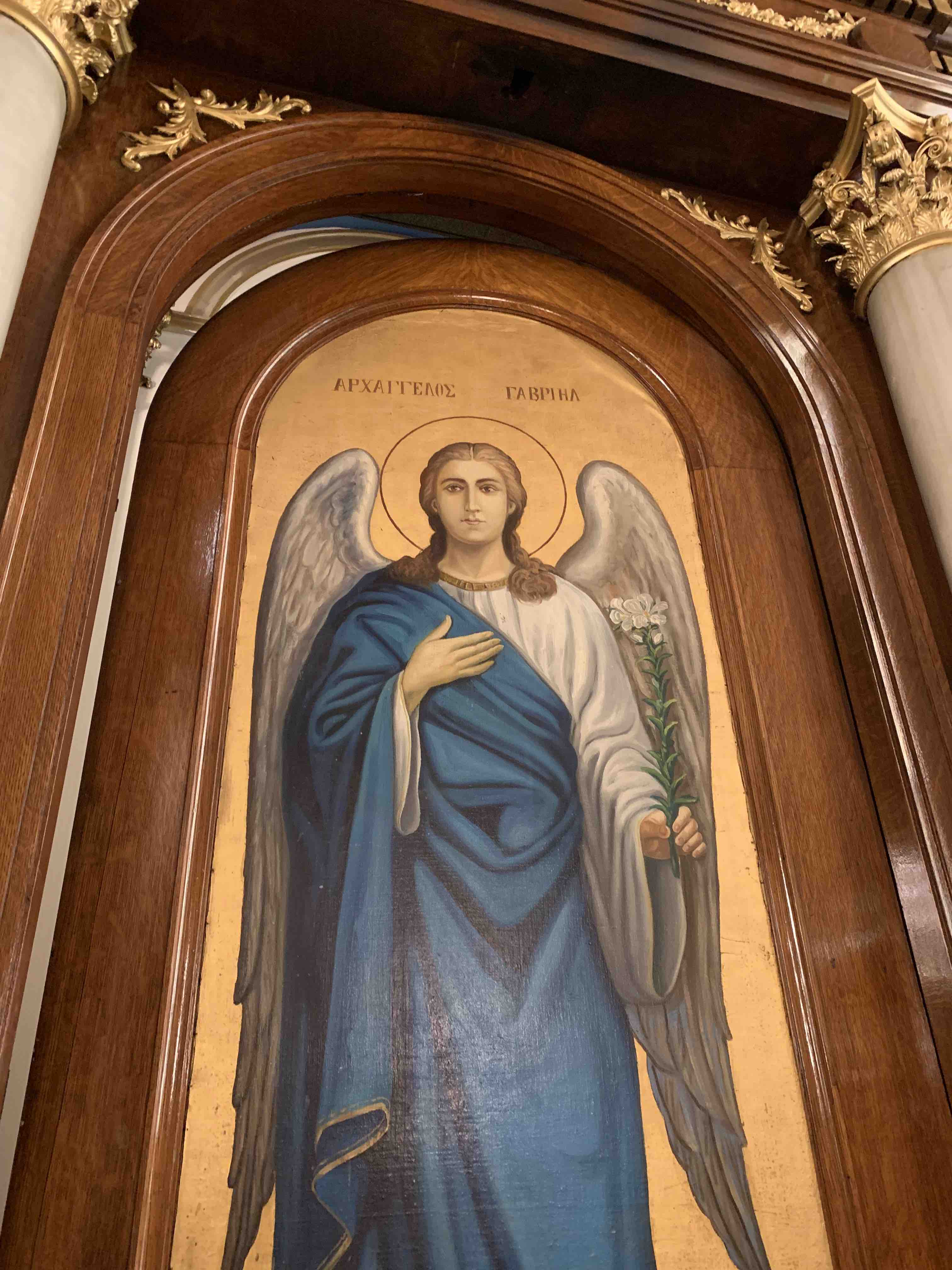
Icon of Archangel Gabriel

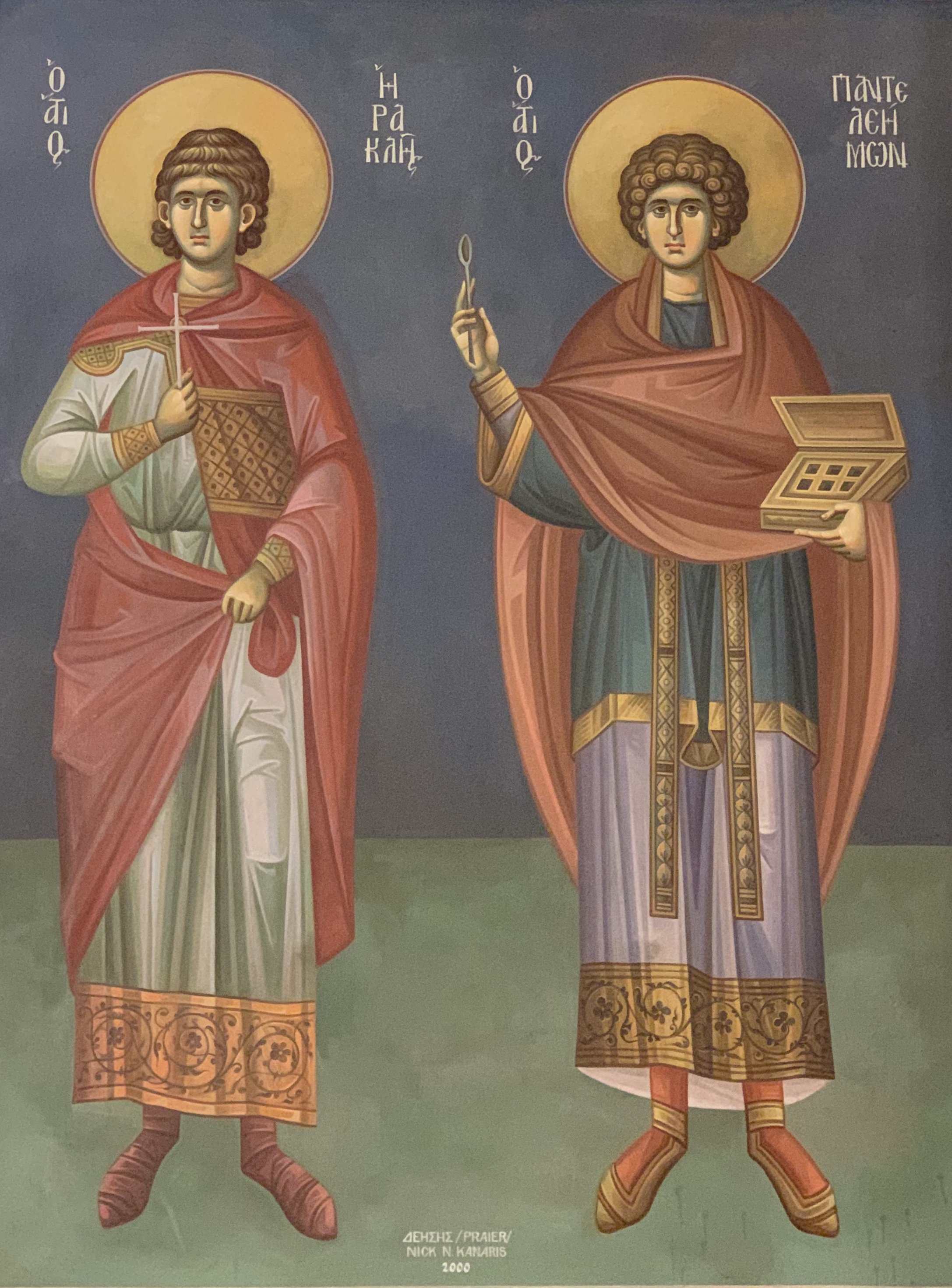
Saints Heracles and Panteleemon

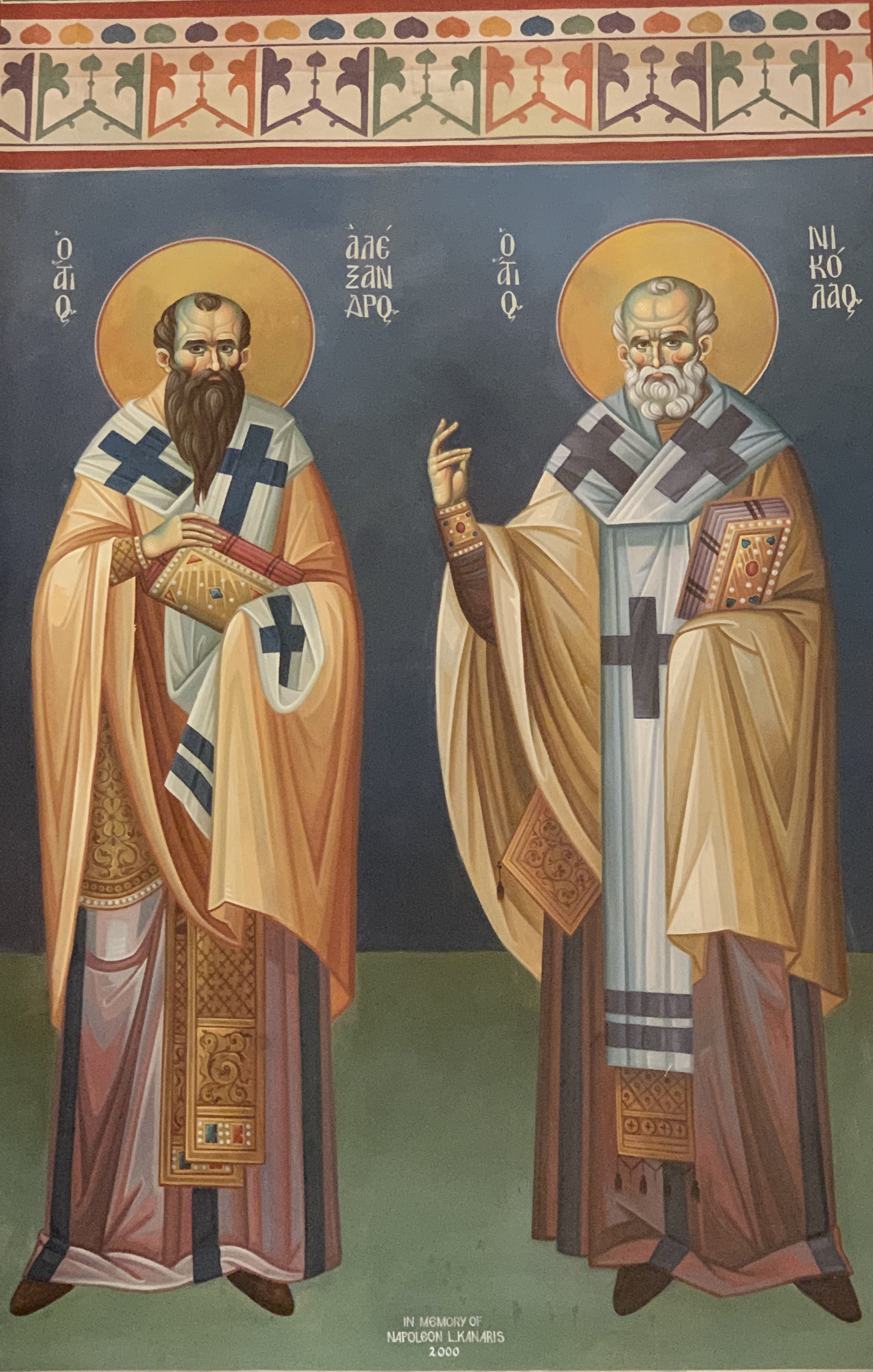

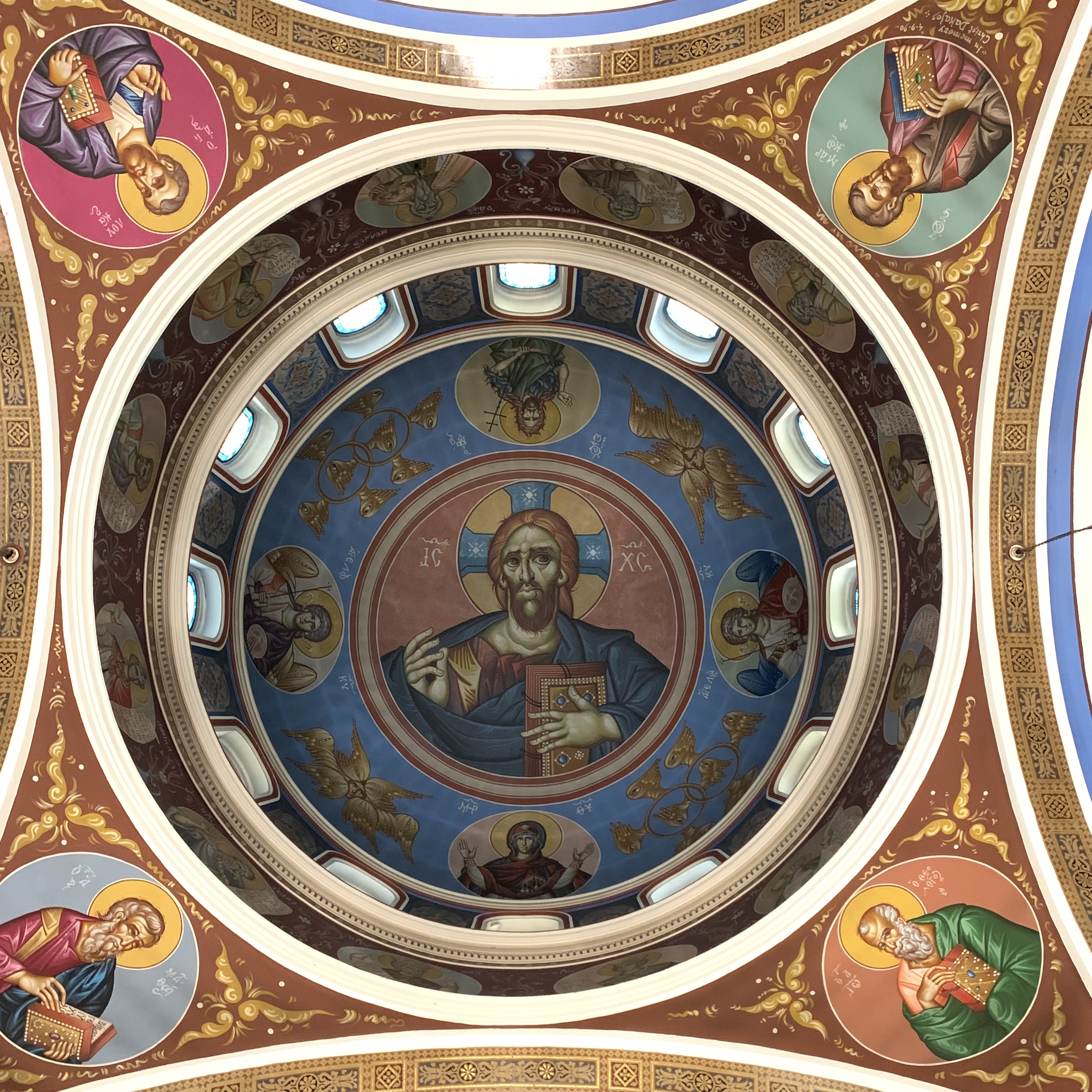

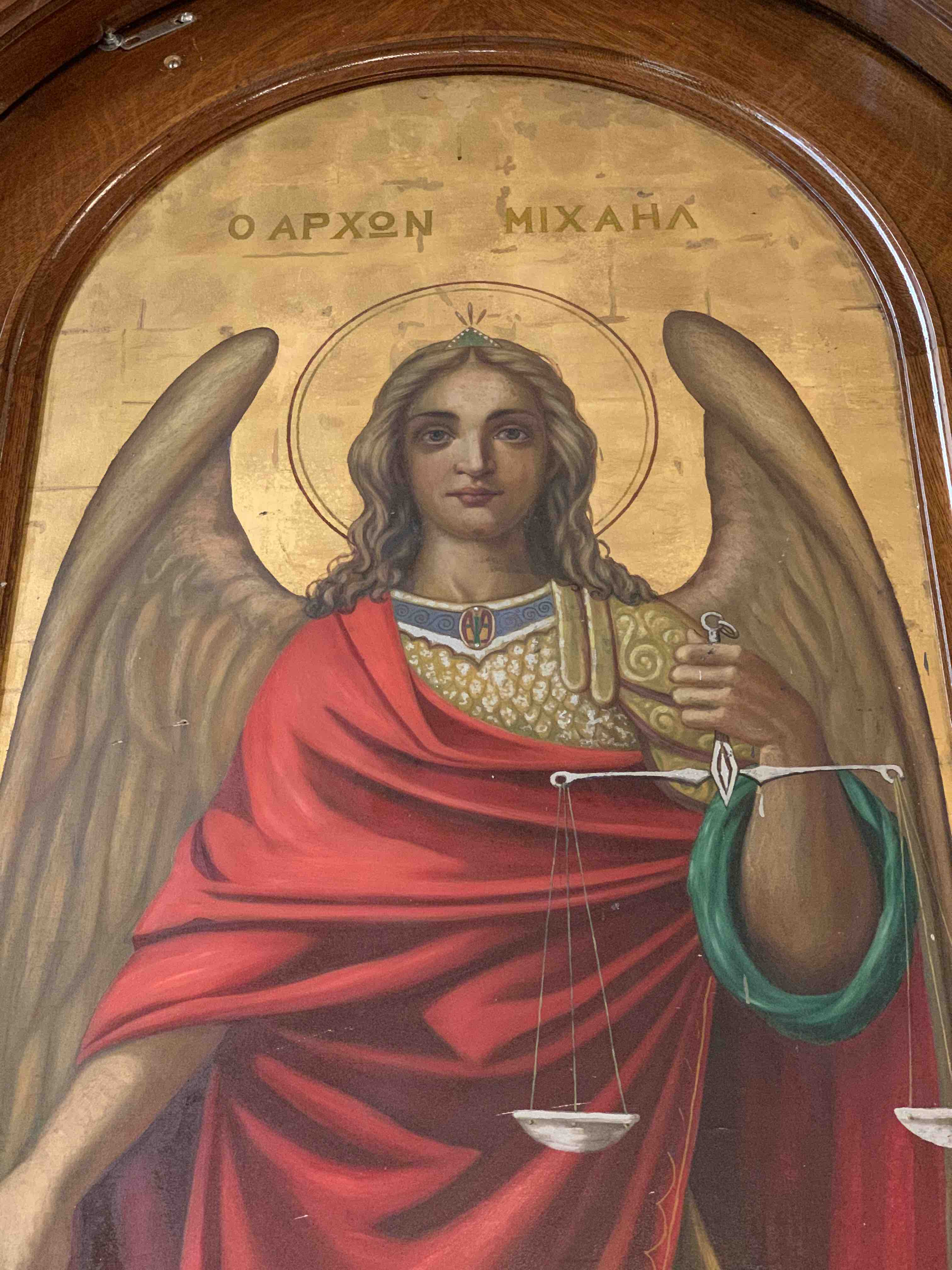
Icon of Archangel Michael

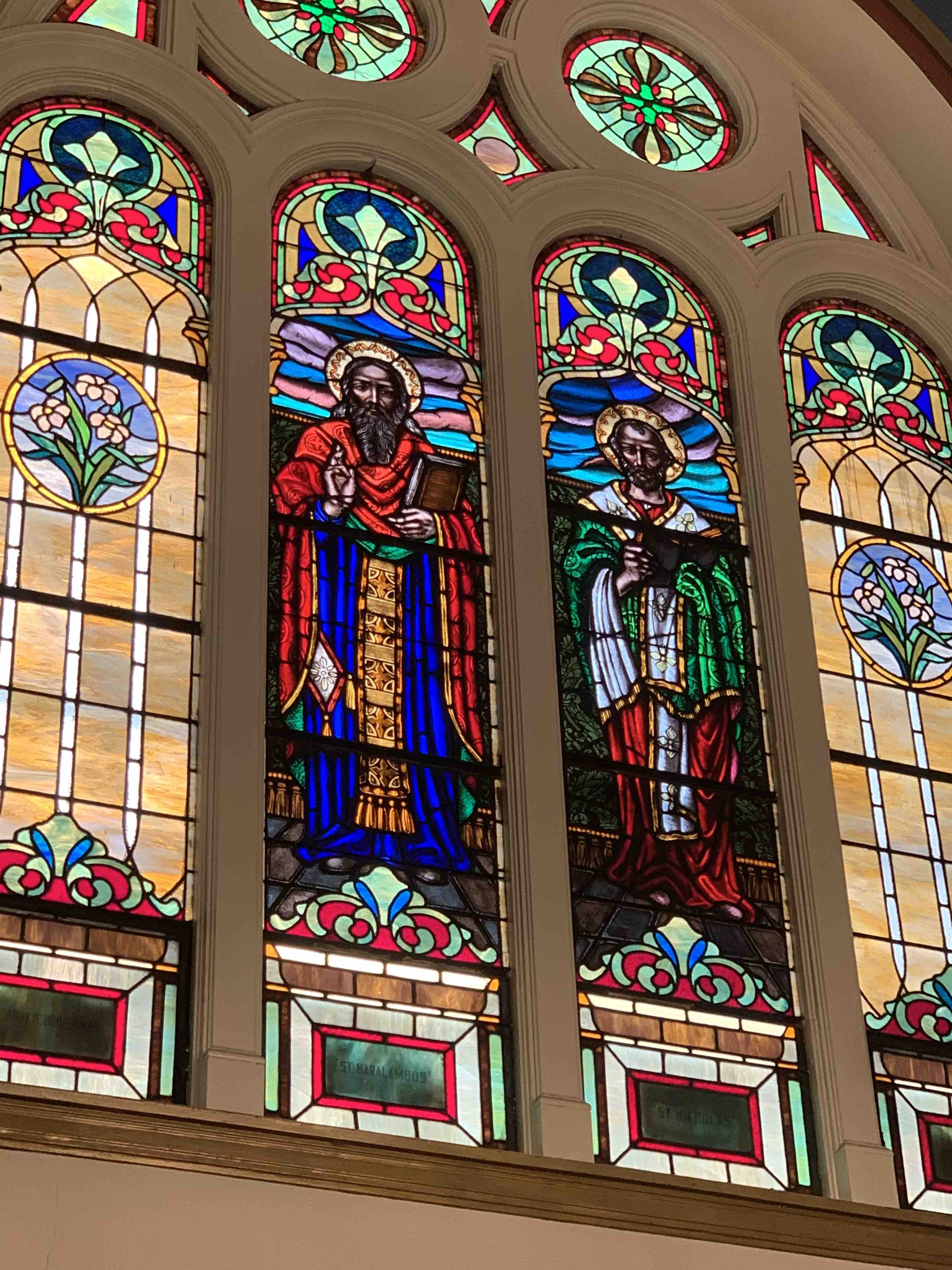

== See also ==
- List of cathedrals in the United States
