= Munich Studio of Chicago =

Stained-glass company

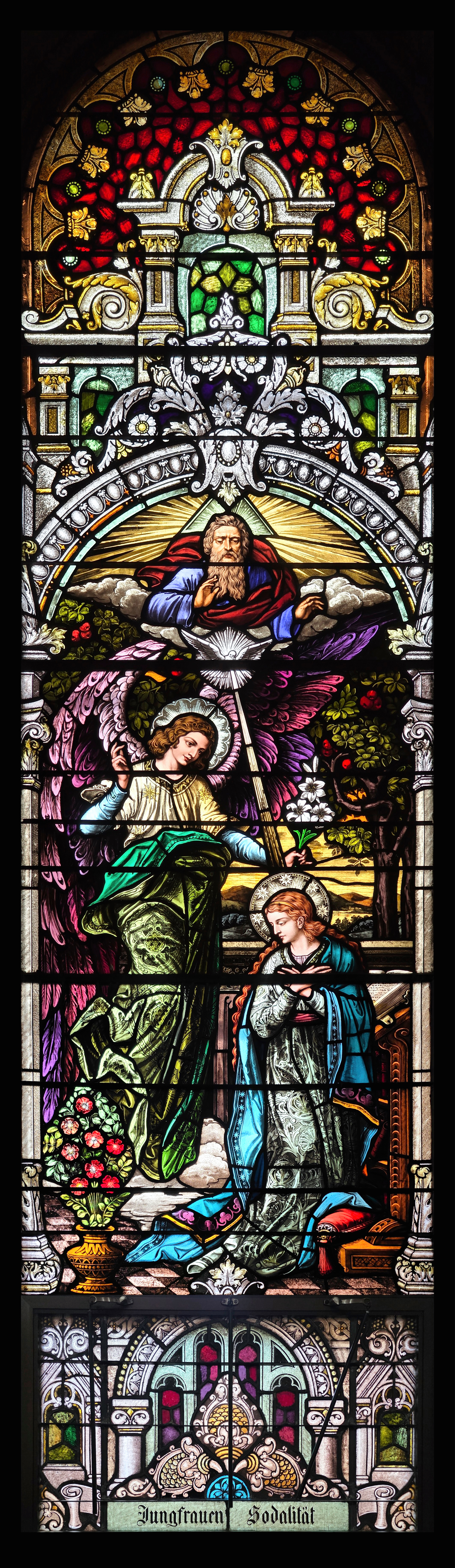
- Type: Stained-glass art company
- Founded: 1903
- Defunct: 1932
- Headquarters: Chicago, Illinois
- Area served: Midwest
- Owner: Max Guler

The Munich Studio of Chicago was a stained-glass window company that operated in Chicago from 1903 to 1932. It was founded by German stained-glass artist Max Guler.

== History ==
Munich Studio of Chicago was established in 1903, by German immigrant artist Max Guler (1870–1937). Guler studied China painting in his native town of Munich and had arrived in Chicago in 1896. He and his two partners, salesman L. Holzchuh and manager/bookkeeper Denis Shanahan, formed a soon-successful firm that hired numerous artisans and eventually made windows for probably 150 churches throughout the Midwest, until the Great Depression arrested church construction and put the company out of business in 1932. Guler and his key artisans thereafter worked for the Drehobl Art Glass Company of Chicago (still in business today), and Guler died in 1937.

Guler was a highly gifted designer of windows. According to Drehobl's son: “Guler was a short, stout man whose greatest enjoyment was to sit at his drawing board dreaming of new ways to express a Biblical event or quotation” in “pictorial windows beautifully grouped in rich, gorgeous colors.” Guler was also proficient in creating and painting windows, although he usually left that work to his master artisans, including: Peter Kugel, who specialized in portraits and flesh tinting; Herman Schulze, who painted landscapes, floral designs, cloth textures and drapery folds; and George Wieroeder and Joseph Lazar, who cut, fired and leaded the glass. These men worked together to execute Guler's beautifully detailed pencil drawings and watercolor renderings.

Guler's rich colors were achieved by hand-painting sections of glass (from France, Germany and the US) with glass paints: ground glass mixed with iron oxide, yellow stain and other colorants; then firing the painted glass in a kiln. Windows made with this detailed painting are known as Munich-style stained-glass, or Munich windows.

Munich Studio windows are characterized by the use of:

- rich jewel colors
- detailed painting of realistic details and convincing depictions of wood, stone, skies and botanically accurate plants
- architectural framing using depictions of pilasters resembling Gothic-style stone towers edging the sides, and ornate architectural canopies of pointed Gothic spires above the scenes that indicate the importance of the figures (much as fabric canopies identified royal persons in Renaissance paintings) and fill the tall vertical space of each window
- perspective: Unlike simple, flat scenes in Medieval windows, Munich Studio windows portray depth through the use of perspective painting, with some figures at forefront, others behind them, and often arched stone windows, beyond which distant landscape scenes can be glimpsed outside, a device commonly employed in Italian Renaissance and Baroque paintings.
- Asymmetric placement of figures that adds movement to the scene, directing the eye from top to bottom and side to side

== List of projects ==
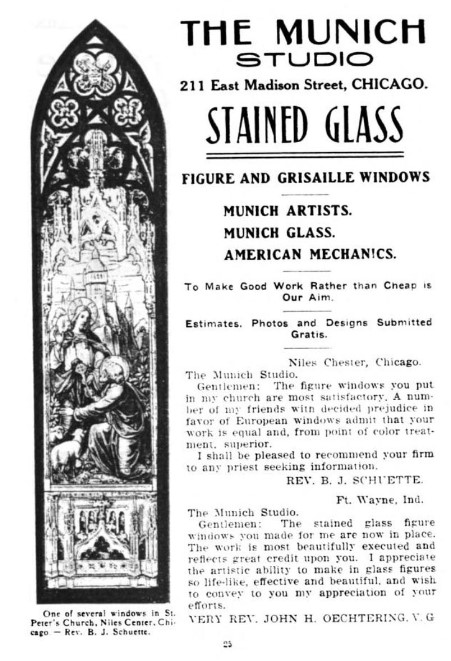
Munich Studio advertisement, Official Catholic Directory 1906

Partial Munich Studio catalog listings from 1910 to 1925 note thirty-two major church installations in Chicago; and ninety-six in churches in other Midwestern states than Illinois. Most of the listings below are from two Munich Studio catalogs in the Chicago History Museum archives (see below) unless otherwise cited, and list the churches in which windows were installed, or the priests who ordered them.

Chicago, IL: Our Lady of Sorrows (c.1900)

Chicago, IL: Presentation Church

Chicago, IL: St. Agnes (1905)

Chicago, IL: St. Bride Church (1910)

Chicago, IL: St. Bridget's

Chicago, IL: St. Dominic's

Chicago, IL: St. Jarlath's Church

Chicago, IL: St. Leo's (1914)

Chicago, IL: St. Margaret Mary (1924)

Chicago, IL: St. Nicholas Ukrainian Catholic Cathedral (1915)

Chicago, IL: St. Philip Benizi Church (1904)

Chicago, IL: St. Phillip's (1916)

Chicago, IL: St. Veronica (1905)

Chicago, IL: (Fr. D.J. Cremins)

Chicago Heights, IL: (Fr. F. Grzes)

Des Plaines, IL: (Fr. J. Linden)

Freeport, IL: Chapel St. Vincent's Orphan Asylum

Keithsburg, IL: St. Mary's

Monmouth, IL: Immaculate Conception Church

Niles Center, IL

Quincy, IL: St. Peter's Church

Rock Island, IL: St. Joseph's

Rutland, IL: Sacred Heart (1910, now in Sacré-Coeur Retreat, Magnolia, IL)

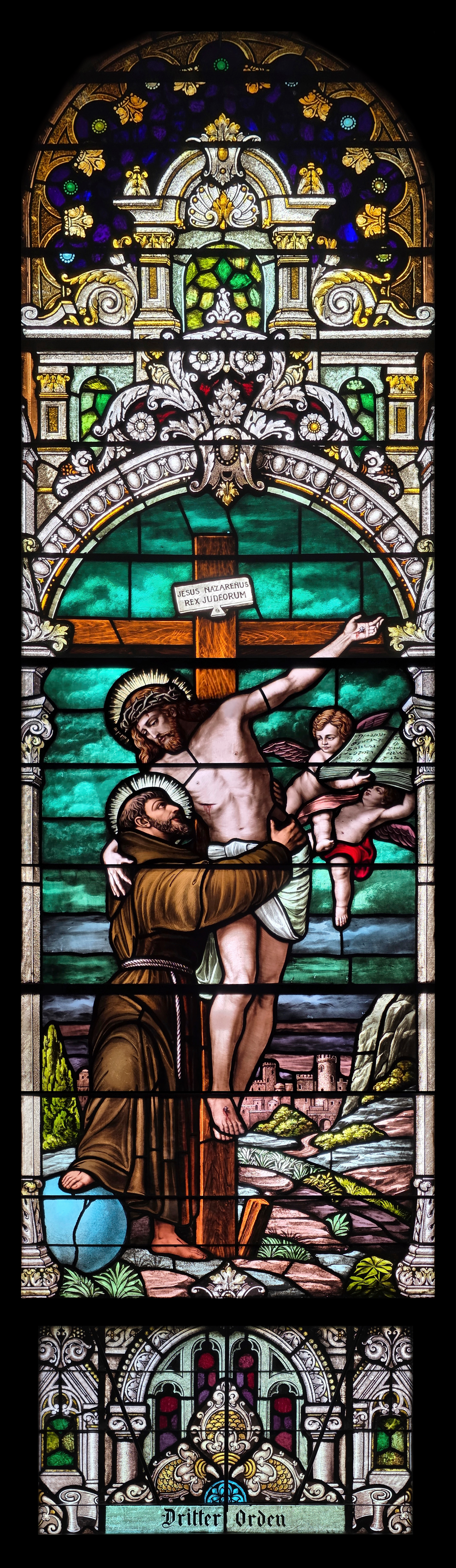
St Francis Embracing Christ on the Cross

Saumonauk, IL: St. John's Church

Walton, IL: (Fr. C.F. Conley)

West Brooklyn, IL: (Fr. M. Krug)

Woodstock, IL: St. Mary's Church

Anthon, IA: (Fr. Geo. Cooke) St. Joseph Catholic Church (1912)

Bellevue, IA: St. Joseph's Church (1910)

Anton, IA: (Fr. Geo. Cooke)

Cedar Falls, IA: St. Patrick's

Council Bluffs, IA: Chapel at St. Bernard's Hospital

Davenport, IA: St. Paul's

Dubuque, IA: St. Joseph's College New Chapel

Lyons, IA: St. Boniface

Mapleton, IA: St. Mary's

Marcus, IA: Holy Name Church (1916)

Mary Hill, IA: Visitation

Mt. Carmel, IA: (Fr. F.H. Huesmann)

Riverside, IA: St. Mary's Catholic Church (1906)

Rock Valley, IA: St. Mary's Catholic Church (1915)

Salix, IA: St. Joseph Parish (1926)

Sheldon, IA: St. Patrick's Church (1912)

Waterloo, IA: Sacred Heart Church

West Point, IA: The Assumption

Worthington, IA: (Fr. J.H. Schilmoeller)

Plymouth, IN: (Fr. J. Tremmel)

Arkansas City, KS: Sacred Heart Church (1920)

Concordia, KS: Nazareth Academy Sacred Heart Chapel (1907)

Horton, KS: (Fr. Jos. Hildebrand)

Kansas City, KS: Holy Name

Lawrence, KS: St. John the Evangelist Church (1924)

Maryville, KS: St. Mary's Church

Olmitz, KS: (Fr. John Huna)

Rosedale, KS: (Fr. A. Dornseifer) Holy Name Church

St. Mary's, KS: Immaculata Chapel

Victoria, KS: Basilica of Saint Fidelis (1916)

Winchester, KY: St. Joseph's Church

Adrian, MI: Adrian Dominican Motherhouse-Holy Rosary Chapel (1908)

Battle Creek, MI: St. Philip's Church

Detroit, MI: Chapel St. Francis Home for Boys

Detroit, MI: Our Lady of the Rosary

Fowler, MI Most Holy Trinity Church (1916)

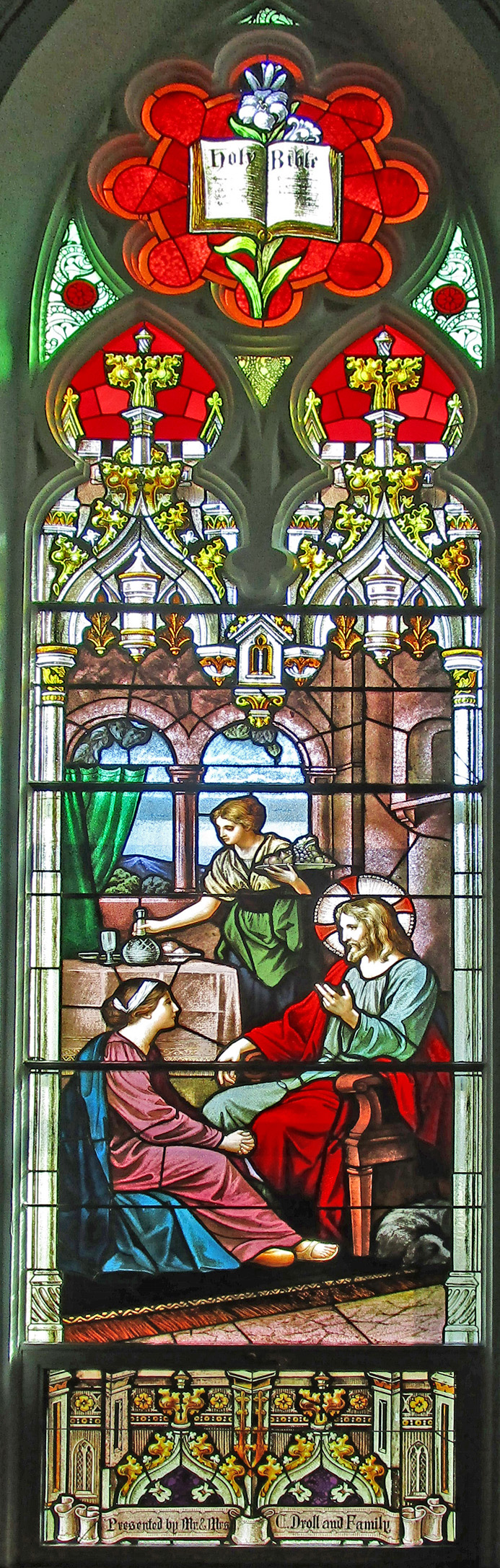

Gross Point Farms, MI: St. Paul Catholic Church (1924)

Hudson, MI: Sacred Heart Church (1905)

Ionia, MI: (Fr. H.D. McCarthy)

Menominee, MI: St. John the Baptist Catholic Church (1921, now Menominee Co. Historical Museum)

Saginaw, MI: St. Joseph Catholic Church (1923)

Wyandotte, MI: Our Lady of Mount Carmel (1915)

Lismore, MN: St. Anthony's Church

Easton, MN: (Fr. C. Hennekes)

Hannibal, MO: (Fr. D.F. O’Sullivan)

Louisiana, MO: St. Joseph's

Montrose, MO: (Fr. William Hovestadt)

Billings, MT: St. Patrick Co-Cathedral

Bozeman, MT: Holy Rosary

Grand Forks, ND: St. Mary's (1914)

Grand Forks, ND: St. Michael's

Ewing, NE: (Fr. Joseph Rose)

Madison, NE: (Fr. E.S. Muenich)

Omaha, NE: St Patrick's Church

O’Neill, NE: St. Patrick's

Paul, NE: (Fr. C. Broermann)

Schuyler, NE: St. Augustine's Church

Stuart, NE: St. Boniface Church

Waverly, NY: St. James Church

Cleveland, OH: (Rev. John Becha, St. Adalbert)

Cleveland, OH: Holy Rosary

Cleveland, OH: Immaculate Heart of Mary Church

Columbus, OH: St. Dominic Church

New Berlin, OH: St. Augustine Church

Tiffin, OH: St. Joseph

Tiffin, OH: St. Mary

Tippecanoe City, OH: Immaculate Conception Church

Youngstown, OH: Sacred Heart of Jesus Church

Perry, OK: St Rose of Lima. Stroseperry.com

Ambridge, PA: St. Stanislaus Church (1929, windows relocated to Good Samaritan Church, Ambridge)

Cambridge Springs, PA: St. Anthony's Church

Conemaugh, PA: Sacred Heart Church (1923, now Church of the Transfiguration)

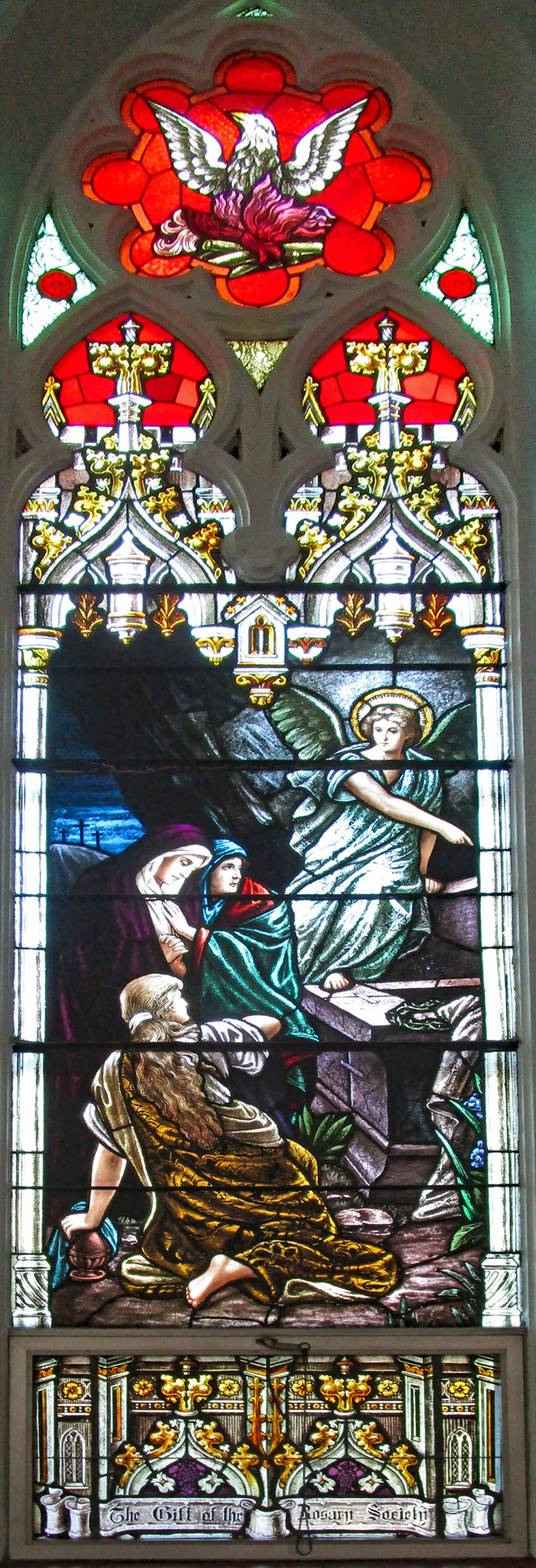

Moscow, PA: St. Catherine of Siena (1924)

Pittsburgh, PA: All Saints Church (1915)

Warren, PA: (Fr. M.J. Orzechowski)

Huron, SD: (Fr. D. Desmond)

Memphis, TN: (Fr. W.G. Scanlon) St. Agnes Academy?

Athens, WI: St. Anthony's Church

Decada, WI: (Fr. C. Flasch)

Luxemburg, WI: Immaculate Conception Church

Milwaukee, WI: St. Augustine's Church

Milwaukee, WI: The Jesu Church

Mineral Point, WI: St. Paul's Church

New Munster, WI: St. Alphonsus

New Munster, WI: St. Mary's Church

Sparta, WI: St. Patrick's

St. Francis, WI: St. John's Institute

Sturgeon Bay, WI: St. Joseph Church (1910)

Waterford, WI: (Fr. Thomas Hennessey)

Waterford, WI: (Fr. J.P. Pierron)

Mannington, WV: St. Patrick's Rectory

== Munich Studio of Chicago catalogs and advertising ==
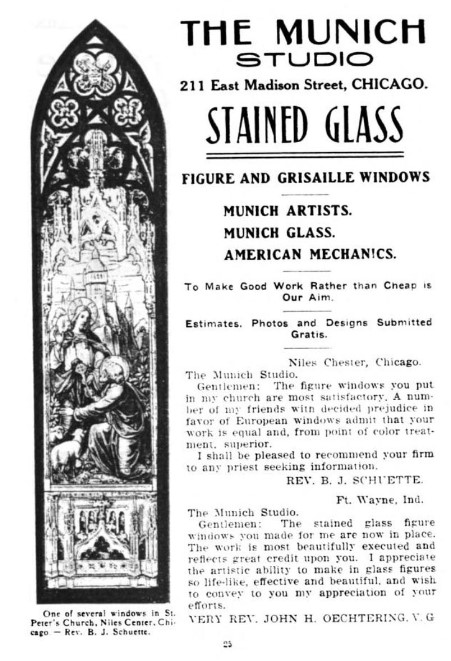
Munich studio advertisement

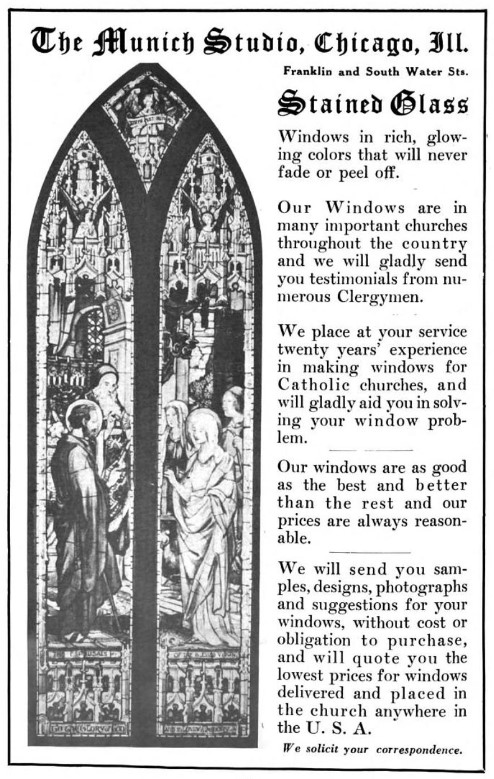
Munich Studio advertisement

Munich Studio of Chicago catalog c.1913

Munich Studio of Chicago catalog c.1920
