= St. Catherine of Siena (Moscow, Pennsylvania) =

Roman Catholic parish

St. Catherine of Siena Parish is located in Moscow, Pennsylvania on Church Street near Main Street. It is a parish of the Roman Catholic Church that operates under the Diocese of Scranton. It primarily serves the towns of Moscow, Madisonville, Daleville, and Spring Brook.

== History ==
According to a history of The Church of Saint Catherine of Siena, which is posted on the organization's website, "The beginning of Catholicism in the North Pocono area predates the existence of St. Catherine's parish" with a significant relocation of Catholics to the area during the mid-1800s for mining and railroad jobs. Initially ministered to by the Rev. Moses Whitty, the pastor of Scranton's St. Vincent de Paul Church (now St. Peter's Cathedral), many of these worshippers then began attending St. Simon the Apostle's, the new church built by Whitty in Dunmore in 1856. The pastor there at this time was Father Edmund W. Fitzmaurice; he was succeeded by Father Michael O'Brien, who died from smallpox a short time later and was replaced by Father Gerald McMurphy. Around this same time, a smaller Catholic church was also built in Moscow. "The site of the church and churchyard was donated to the congregation in 1853 by William E. Dodge and his wife Melissa, owners of an area sawmill." Situated "near the front of the present St. Catherine's cemetery," it was constructed by local carpenter John Simpson and Martin McAndrew, who "built the foundation and walls," and dedicated by "Bishop Neumann (now St. John Neumann) of Philadelphia."

In response to the significant growth of the Catholic population in Northeastern Pennsylvania throughout the mid-1800s, William O'Hara was promoted from his position as the pastor of St. Patrick's in Philadelphia to the role of bishop in Scranton. In 1884, Bishop O'Hara officially designated the Catholic community of Moscow as a parish, and appointed as its first pastor, the Rev. M. J. Manly, who became known as "'Shepherd of the Hills' since the parish was considered the Mother Church of the Poconos." The Rev. Richard H. Walsh succeeded Manly in 1889, and was followed by the Rev. Daniel A. Dunne in 1899. "The next pastor was Rev. M. J. Fleming who came to St. Catherine's in 1907 and remained for twelve years."

Appointed as the next pastor of St. Catherine's on January 18, 1919, the Rev. Dennis J. Kane inspired the growing congregation during his tenure to raise funds for, and build, a new church, the cornerstone of which was laid on September 23, 1923 by Bishop M. J. Hoban. According to the history of St. Catherine's:

"Mrs. Martin McAndrew and Mrs. William Tigue, both present at the ceremony, were believed to be the only living persons who participated in the dedicatory ceremonies of the first St. Catherine's Church in 1859 and the laying of the cornerstone of the new church in 1923. Mrs. McAndrew became the center of attention at the dedication ceremonies when people became aware that she was present at the ceremonies in 1859. In fact, it was Mrs. McAndrew's husband, Martin, who had built the foundation walls of the first church."

The new church, which was officially dedicated by Bishop Hoban on August 31, 1924, was designed by architect John J. Howley in the Tudor Gothic style, and was "built of fieldstone gathered from the vicinity of the Drinker Turnpike and nearby area" with a Spanish tile roof and altar and altar railing of Italian Carrara marble, windows from the Munich Studio of Chicago, Stations of the Cross by Daprato, and a baptismal font dedicated to the Rev. Edmund W. Fitzmaurice. Kane reportedly used "his automobile to hoist the heavy fieldstones into position to be laid." In addition, an episcopal sanction authorized construction of a vault beneath the church "to provide the final resting place of Patrick J. Conway and his wife, Barbara, who contributed largely to the building of the church." The first baptism conducted here was actually done before this dedication and was that of Helen Strazyk, a daughter of Anna and George Strazyk, on July 27, 1924. The church's pastor at this time, Father Kane, subsequently bought land to create a cemetery for St. Catherine's, and then also formed the St. Catherine's Cemetery Association. He was then succeeded by the Reverends T. M. Jordan (1926-1928), P. F. Cawley (1928-1936), E. J. McGuire (1936-1944), and J. M. McGowan, assistant from 1939-1943 and pastor from 1951-1958).At the time of the June 6, 1980 appointment of Monsignor Joseph P. Kelly to the post of parish pastor, the congregation included the members of 800 families.

== Current staff ==
- Reverend Robert Simon - pastor
- Sandra Czyzyk, director of religious education
- Paul Lukasiewicz, director of music
- Kate Phillips - youth ministry coordinator

== Mass times ==
- Sunday Mass Times: Saturday 5 PM, Sunday 7:30 AM, 9 AM, 11:30 AM.
- Weekday masses are offered each day at 8:30 AM in the Eucharistic Chapel.
- Confessions are offered each Saturday in the Eucharistic Chapel.

== Services ==
- A preschool program is offered to children of age 4 (pre-kindergarten) that runs according to the North Pocono School District schedule.
- Religious education program for children grades K through 8 will guide students through making First Holy Eucharist and eventually will culminate with Confirmation.
