= Nathanael Symeonides =

Greek Orthodox bishop

His Eminence Nathanael The Reverend
- Metropolitan of Chicago
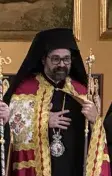
- Metropolitan Nathanael in 2025
- Archdiocese: America
- See: Chicago
- Installed: March 24, 2018
- Term ended: Incumbent
- Predecessor: Metropolitan Iakovos (Garmatis)

Orders
- Ordination: 2003 (diaconate); 2010 (presbyter)
- Consecration: February 7, 2018

Personal details
- Born: Constantinos Symeonides; May 23, 1978 (age 48) Thessaloniki, Greece
- Denomination: Greek Orthodox
- Education: Hellenic College; Boston University

Metropolitan Nathanael of Chicago, secular name Constantinos Symeonides (Greek: Κωνσταντίνος Συμεωνίδης; born May 23, 1978) is the Metropolitan of Chicago since 2018.

== Biography ==
Nathanael was born in 1978 in Thessaloniki to Irene and Vasilios Symeonides. In 2003 he graduated from Hellenic College and became a deacon, and in 2010 he was ordained as a priest. In 2016 he served as the director of the Office of Inter-Orthodox for the Interfaith Relations at the Greek Orthodox Archdiocese of America in collaboration with the Council on Foreign Relations. He was elected Metropolitan of Chicago in February 7, 2018, and was ordained a bishop on March 17, 2018 and enthroned March 24, 2018.

As bishop, Nathanael has called for more active engagement of the church with the youth. On September 7, 2024, two days before the one year anniversary of the opening of Chicago's first casino, Nathanael denounced legalized gambling, stating it "disrupts our brain, [and] degrades our dignity".

Eastern Orthodox Church titles
Preceded by Iakovos (Garmatis)	Metropolitan of Chicago; 2018 – Present	Succeeded by Incumbent
