= Rafael Sanus Abad =

- Titular bishop of Germaniciana
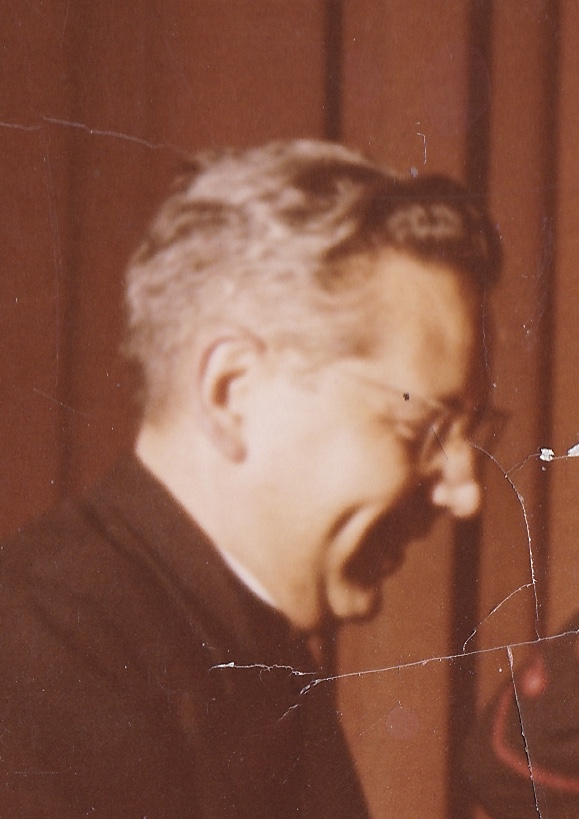

Orders
- Ordination: June 22, 1958

Personal details
- Born: August 29, 1931
- Died: May 13, 2010 (aged 78)
- Denomination: Roman Catholic
- Coat of arms

Rafael Sanus Abad (August 29, 1931 – May 13, 2010) was the Roman Catholic titular bishop of Germaniciana and auxiliary bishop of the Roman Catholic Archdiocese of Valencia, Spain.

Ordained a priest for the Valencia Archdiocese on June 22, 1958, Sanus Abad was named auxiliary bishop of the archdiocese on February 3, 1989, and was ordained on March 12, 1989. He signed on November 17, 2000.

== See also ==
· · ·
