= St. Nicholas Cathedral (Chicago) =

Ukrainian Greek Catholic cathedral

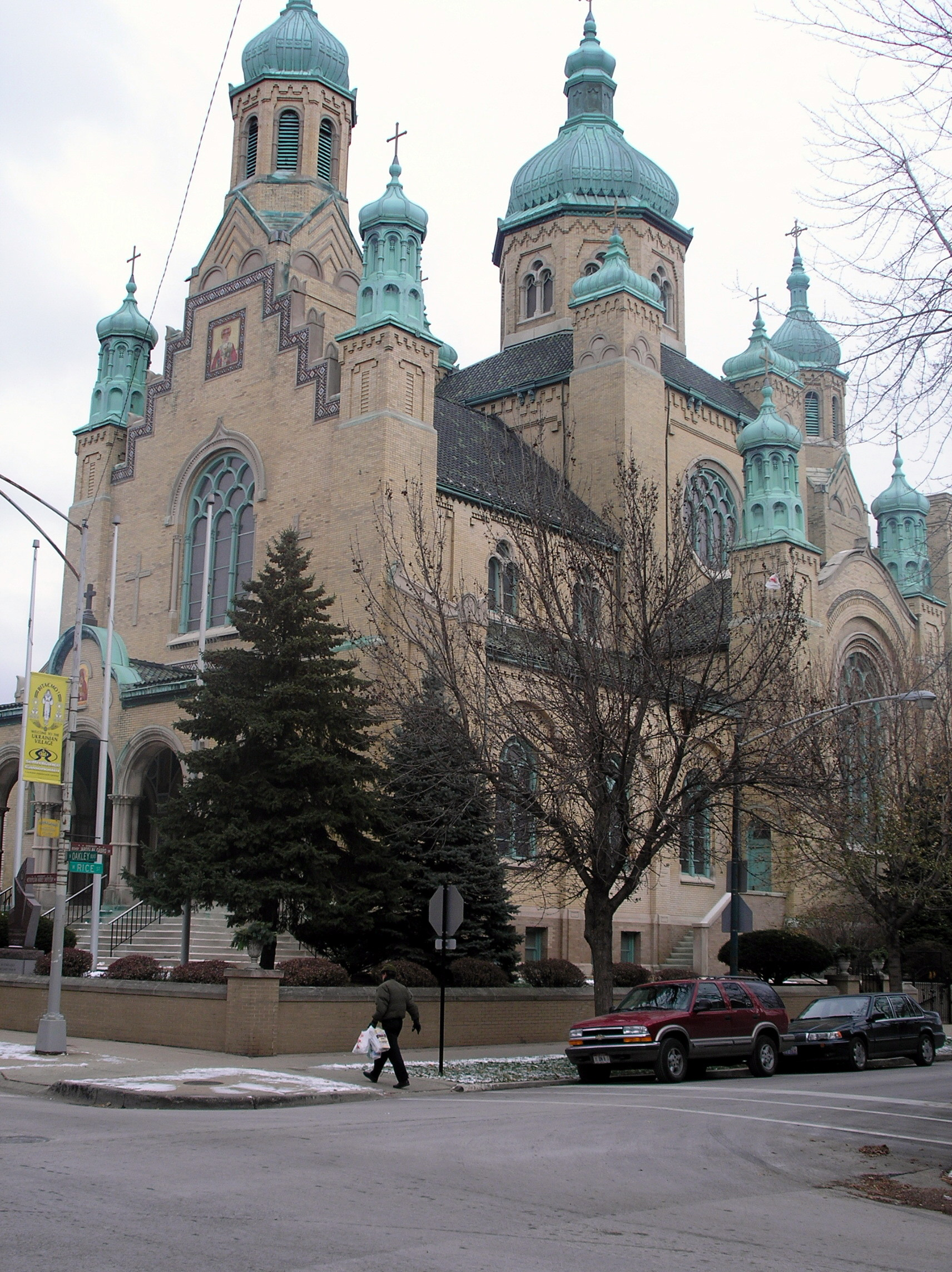

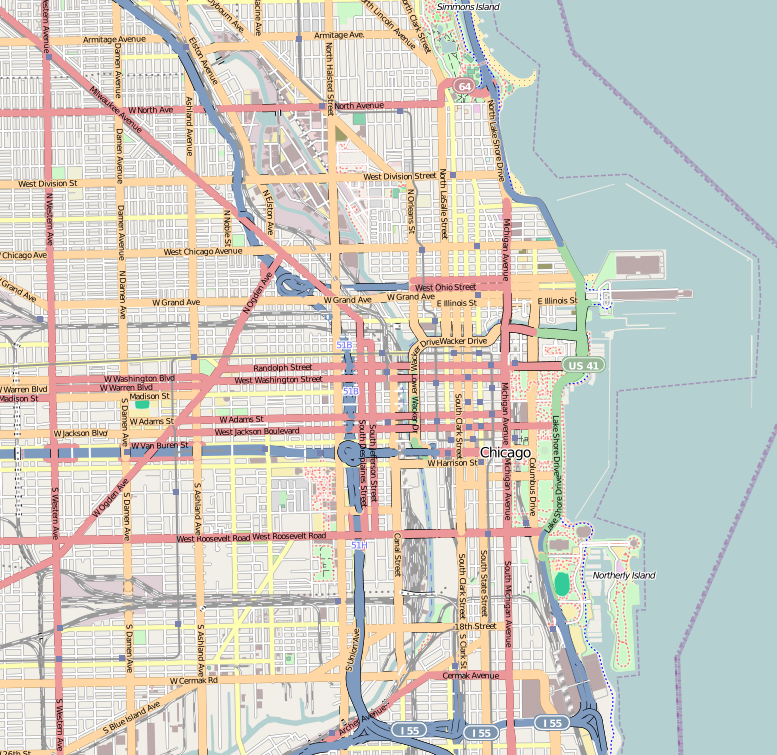
- Location within Central Chicago
- 41°53′49.2″N 87°41′1.94″W
- Location: 835 N. Oakley Blvd. Chicago, Illinois
- Country: United States
- Denomination: Ukrainian Greek Catholic Church
- Sui iuris church: Ukrainian Greek Catholic Church
- Website: www.stnicholaschicago.org

History
- Founded: 1906

Architecture
- Architect: Worthmann & Steinbach
- Style: Byzantine Revival
- Completed: 1915

Specifications
- Capacity: 1,200
- Length: 155 feet (47 m)
- Width: 55 feet (17 m)

Administration
- Diocese: Eparchy of St. Nicholas of Chicago

Clergy
- Bishop: Most Rev. BENEDICT (Aleksiychuk)
- Rector: Very Rev. Pavlo Drozdyak

St. Nicholas Cathedral is a Ukrainian Greek Catholic cathedral located in the Ukrainian Village neighborhood of Chicago, Illinois, United States. It houses the seat for the Eparchy of Saint Nicholas of Chicago.

== History ==
In the late 1890s immigrants from western and Carpathian Ukraine begin to arrive on Chicago's north side. Planning for the establishment of St. Nicholas Parish began in 1905 by a small group of Ukrainian laborers. The parish was established the following year on January 28. By then they had raised enough money to buy their first church from a Danish Protestant congregation at Bishop and Superior streets. The property at Oakley Boulevard and Rice Street was purchased in 1913 and the present church was completed in 1915. Property on Higgins Road was purchased for a cemetery in 1925 for $10,000.00.

The parish school was built in 1936. As more immigrants settled in the neighborhood after World War II and the congregation grew, the school was expanded in 1954. The Eparchy of Saint Nicholas of Chicago was established on July 14, 1961 and St. Nicholas was elevated as the cathedral. From 1974 to 1977 the cathedral's interior was renovated by iconographer Boris Makarenko. The Divine Liturgy is celebrated in both Ukrainian and English.

== Architecture ==
The church was designed by the Chicago architectural firm of Worthmann & Steinbach. It was modeled after Saint Sophia's Cathedral in Kyiv. There is an image of St. Sophia's Cathedral in the fresco above the main altar. The exterior features thirteen domes that represent Christ and the Twelve Apostles. A mosaic of Our Lady of Pochaiv is located above the main entrance and above her is the icon of the cathedral patron, St. Nicholas. The interior is covered in icons that are rendered in both mosaics and frescos. The icons are patterned after those found in St. Sophia in Kyiv. They depict the life of Christ, his Mother Mary and many saints. The only icon that was not touched in the 1974-1977 renovation was one that depicts Christ with his apostles and his Mother in the rear of the sanctuary. It dates from 1928. A chandelier, made in Greece, is suspended from the main dome. It is made of gold and features nine tiers that are lit with 480 lights. Images of the 12 apostles encircle the exterior. It is thought to be the largest chandelier of its kind in the United States. The stained glass windows in the church were designed by the Munich Studio of Chicago.

== See also ==
- List of Catholic cathedrals in the United States
- List of cathedrals in the United States
