= Greek Orthodox Metropolis of Chicago =

Metropolis of the Greek Orthodox Church

Coordinates: 43°N 91°W

Metropolis of Chicago
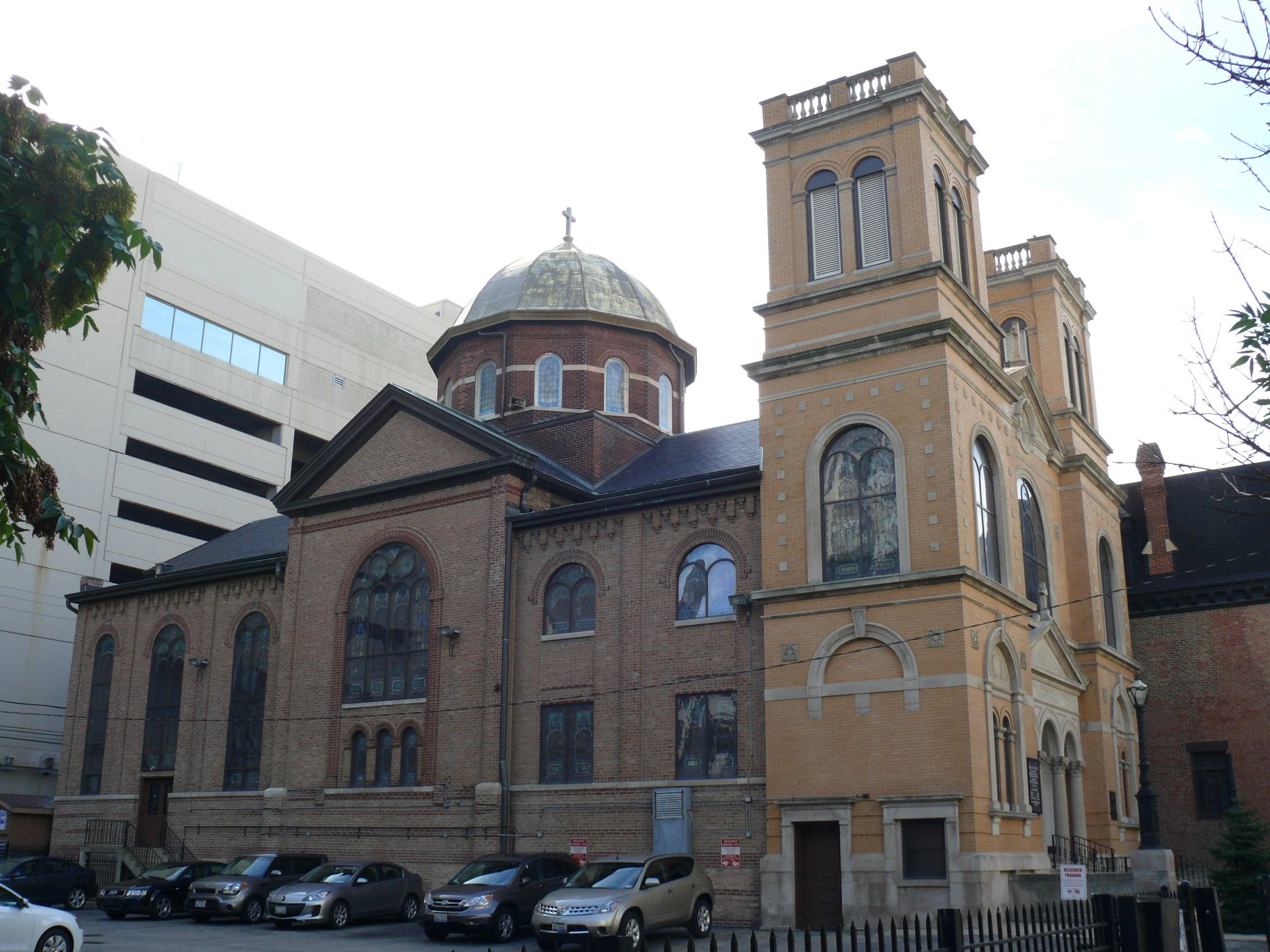

Location
- Country: United States of America
- Territory: Illinois, Wisconsin, Iowa, Minnesota, Northern Indiana, and Eastern Missouri, United States

Statistics
- Population: Total: ~250,000
- Parishes: 61

Information
- Cathedral: Annunciation Cathedral of Chicago

Current leadership
- Patriarch: Ecumenical Patriarch of Constantinople
- Major Archbishop: Archbishop Elpidophoros of America
- Metropolitan: Nathanael (Symeonides)

Website
- https://chicago.goarch.org/

The Metropolis of Chicago (Greek: Ιερά Μητρόπολις Σικάγου) is a metropolis of the Greek Orthodox Church, part of the Greek Orthodox Archdiocese of America, in the North-Central Midwest, United States, with its see city of Chicago. The mother church of the Metropolis is Annunciation Cathedral in Chicago. As of 2018, its current bishop is metropolitan Nathanael Symeonides.

== History ==
The Metropolis of Chicago traces its roots to 1923, when Rev. Philaret Ioannides became the city’s first Greek Orthodox bishop. Nearly twenty years later, Chicago became the "2nd Diocesan District" of the Greek Orthodox Archdiocese of North & South America. That district would continue to coordinate the ecclesial growth of this major immigrant, industrial, and rail center on the southwestern shores of Lake Michigan. Some of the first Greek Orthodox parishes were founded in Chicago.

A number of bishops served the diocesan community, including Meletios, Ezekiel and the late Timotheos of Rodostolon. Each brought unique talents to Chicago's Greek Orthodox and larger communities. This episcopal ministry was led by Chicago's Metropolitan Iakovos, who ministered for thirty eight years.

On 7 February 2018, the Holy Synod of the Ecumenical Patriarchate of Constantinople unanimously elected Nathanael Symeonides as the metropolitan of Chicago, succeeding Metropolitan Iakovos. He was ordained a bishop on 17 March 2018, in the Archdiocesan Cathedral of the Holy Trinity, New York City, and enthroned on 24 March 2018 in the Annunciation Greek Orthodox Cathedral (Chicago).

== Organization ==
The majority of metropolis parishes are concentrated in the Chicago metropolitan area, where immigrants arrived as early as the 19th century. The older parishes are found primarily in the older Midwestern industrialized cities, while newer congregations have followed demographic patterns in suburban and even rural/missionary contexts. Within recent decades, Metropolis churches have been built integrating traditional Byzantine forms; earlier structures, in contrast, often were acquired from other faith groups.

== Bishops ==
- Bishop Philaret (Ioannides) 1923 – 1930
- Bishop Gerasimos of Chicago 1943 – 1954
- Bishop Aimilianos (Laloussis) 1960
- Bishop Thimotheos (Haloftis) 1967 - 1977
- Metropolitan Iakovos (Garmatis) 1977 – 2017
- Metropolitan Nathanael (Symeonides) 2018 – Present

== Parishes ==
The Metropolis of Chicago consists of thirty-four parishes in Illinois, with another twenty-four parishes in Wisconsin, Minnesota, Iowa, northern Indiana, and eastern and central Missouri. The general offices of the Greek Orthodox Metropolis of Chicago are located in Elk Grove Village, Illinois. The diocese also runs two monasteries, the Holy Monastery of Transfiguration in Harvard, Illinois and the Holy Convent of Saint John Chrysostom in Pleasant Prairie, Wisconsin.

== See also ==
- Greeks in Chicago
- Diocese of the Midwest
