= Univ Lavra =

Lavra of the Ukrainian Greek Catholic Church

Univ Holy Dormition Lavra of the Studite Rite
- Ukrainian: Свято-Успенська Унівська Лавра Студійського уставу
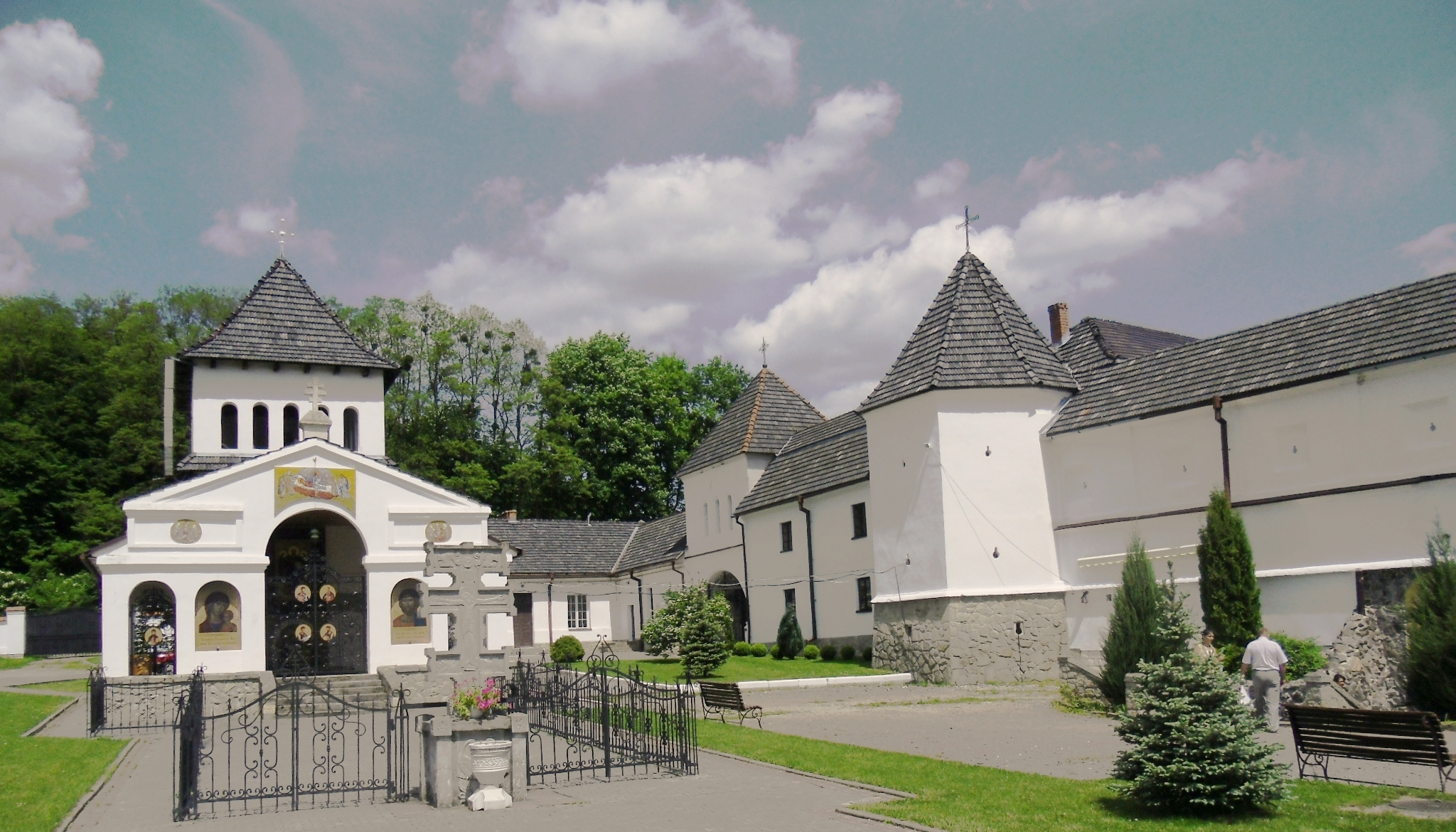
- View of the Univ Lavra.

- Location within Lviv Oblast Univ Lavra (Ukraine)
- Interactive map of the Univ Holy Dormition Lavra of the Studite Rite area

General information
- Location: Univ, Lviv Raion, Lviv Oblast, Ukraine, Ukraine
- Coordinates: 49°43′22″N 24°35′43″E
- Owner: Ukrainian Greek Catholic Church

Website
- studyty.org.ua

Univ Holy Dormition Lavra of the Studite Rite (Ukrainian: Свято-Успенська Унівська Лавра Студійського уставу) is the only lavra of the Ukrainian Greek Catholic Church. It is situated in Univ, Lviv Raion, Lviv Oblast. The monastery is home to the Studite Brethren.

== History ==
There is evidence of monastic life in Univ going back to the 11th century.

The original Orthodox monastery was founded ca. 1400 by Theodore, the son of Liubartas. Parts of the 15th century walls survive. The abbey was surrounded by a high rampart and a deep moat. The main church is dedicated to the Assumption of Mary. It was built after a Tatar raid in 1548 and looks like a small fortress.

In 1606, the monastery housed a library and a small printing press; the press fell into disuse, but was restarted in 1668.

A two-storey bell tower from the 1630s stands nearby.

The monastery was disbanded in 1790 by the Austrian Empire. Mykhajlo Levitsky transformed the property into his residence. The moat was filled in and parts of the medieval wall were demolished. Levitsky's summer palace dates from the 1820s. He died there in 1858.

In 1899, a group of men led by Andrey Sheptytsky arrived at a home near Krystinopil (now Chervonohrad) and started to live a monastic lifestyle; this led to the official re-establishment of the lavra in 1904.

During WWII, the Germans occupied the area, and the lavra became a hiding place for local Jews; after the war, the Soviet authorities nationalised the property and turned it into a nursing home. Most of the monks were arrested and some were deported.

The Declaration of Independence of Ukraine in 1991 led to the return and rebuilding of the lavra.

Church of the martyr Clement and Leontius.

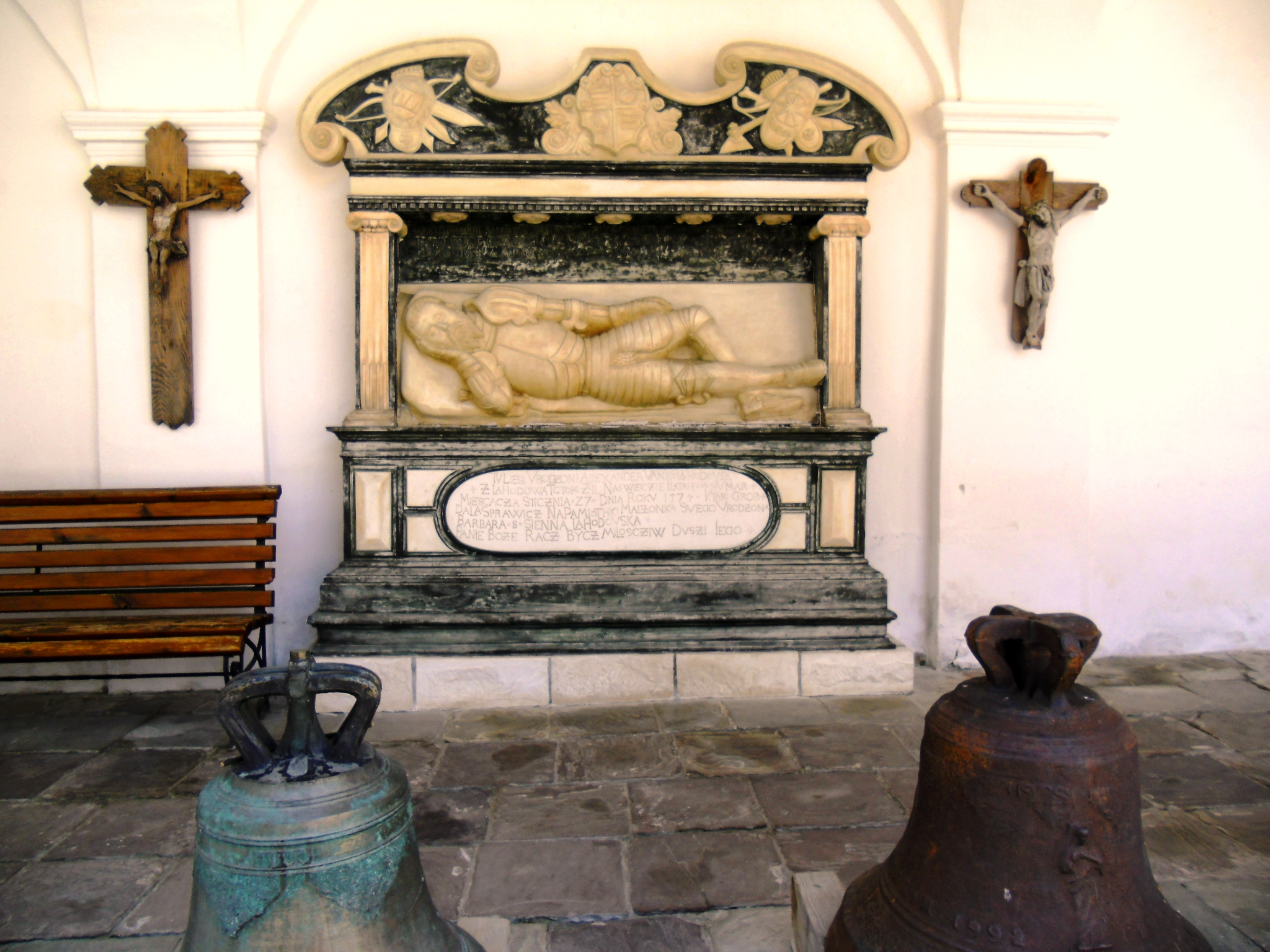
A copy of the tomb of Alexander Vanka Lahodovskoho the Holy Assumption

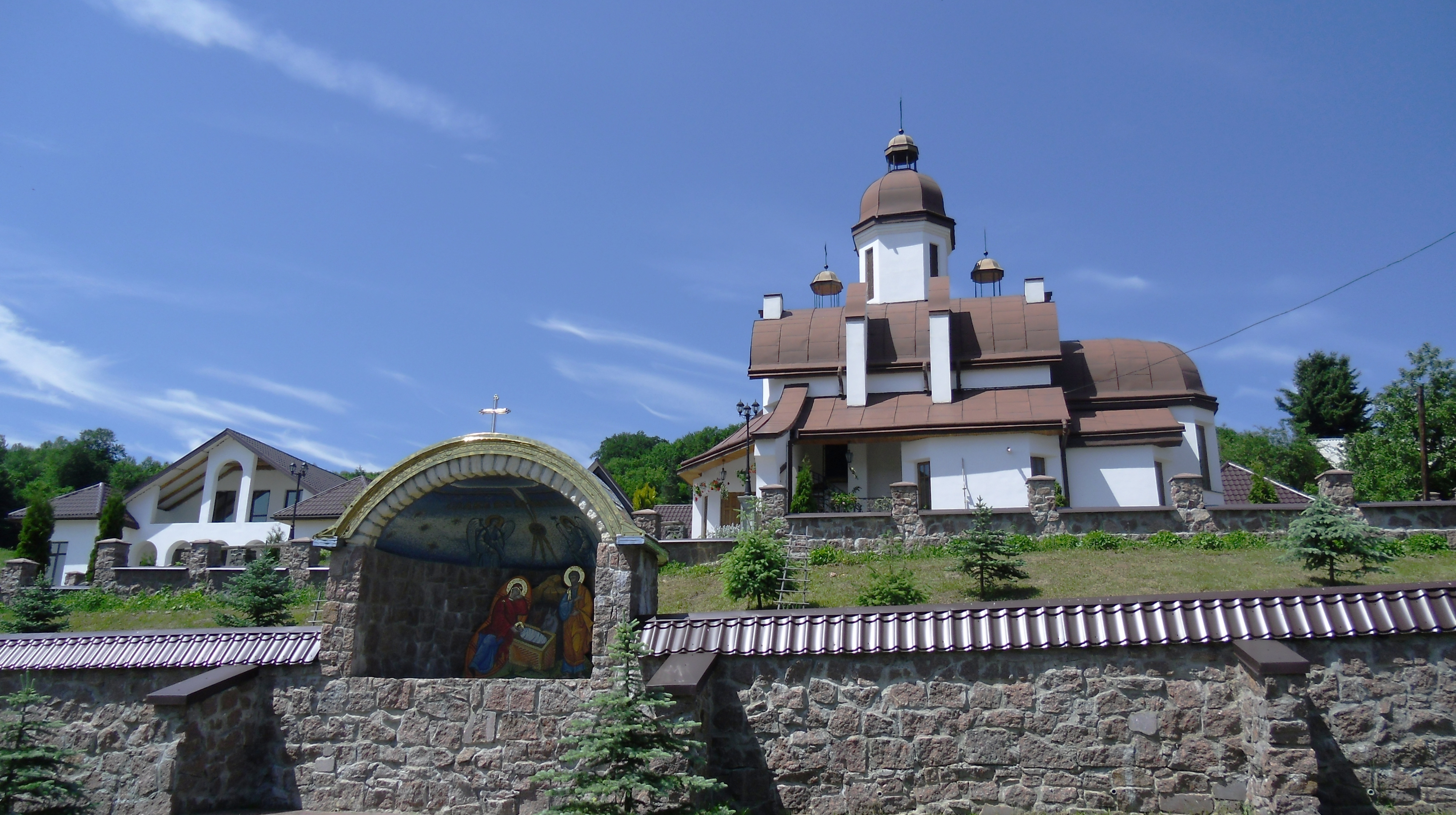
Temple of the Ascension of the Lord UGCC.

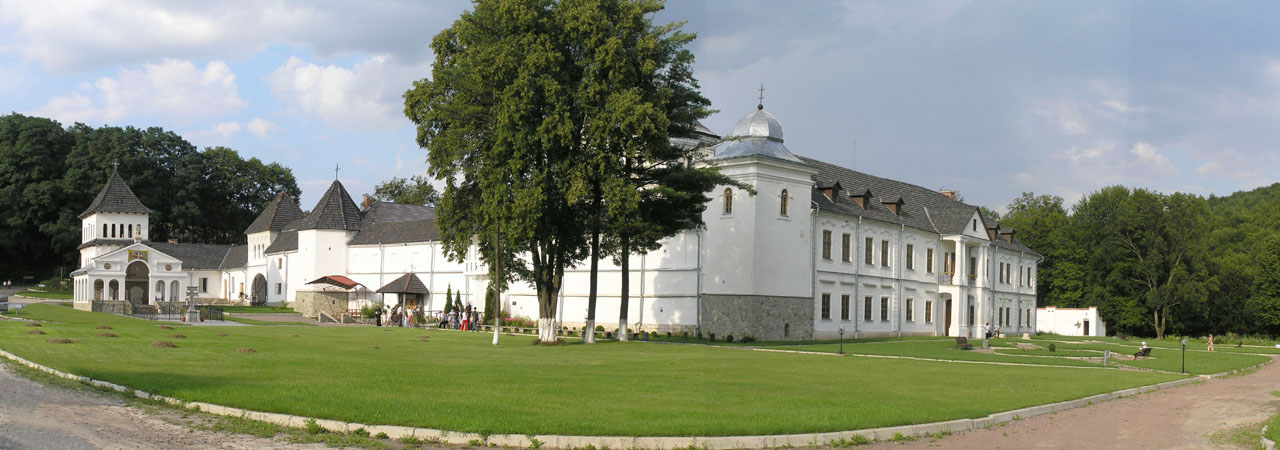
View of the Univ Lavra.

== See also ==
- Persecution of Christians in the Soviet Union
- USSR anti-religious campaign (1917–1921)
- USSR anti-religious campaign (1921–1928)
- USSR anti-religious campaign (1928–1941)
- USSR anti-religious campaign (1958–1964)
- USSR anti-religious campaign (1970s–1990)
