= Ukrainian Studite Monks =

Ukrainian Greek Catholic monastic order

Monks of the Studite Order
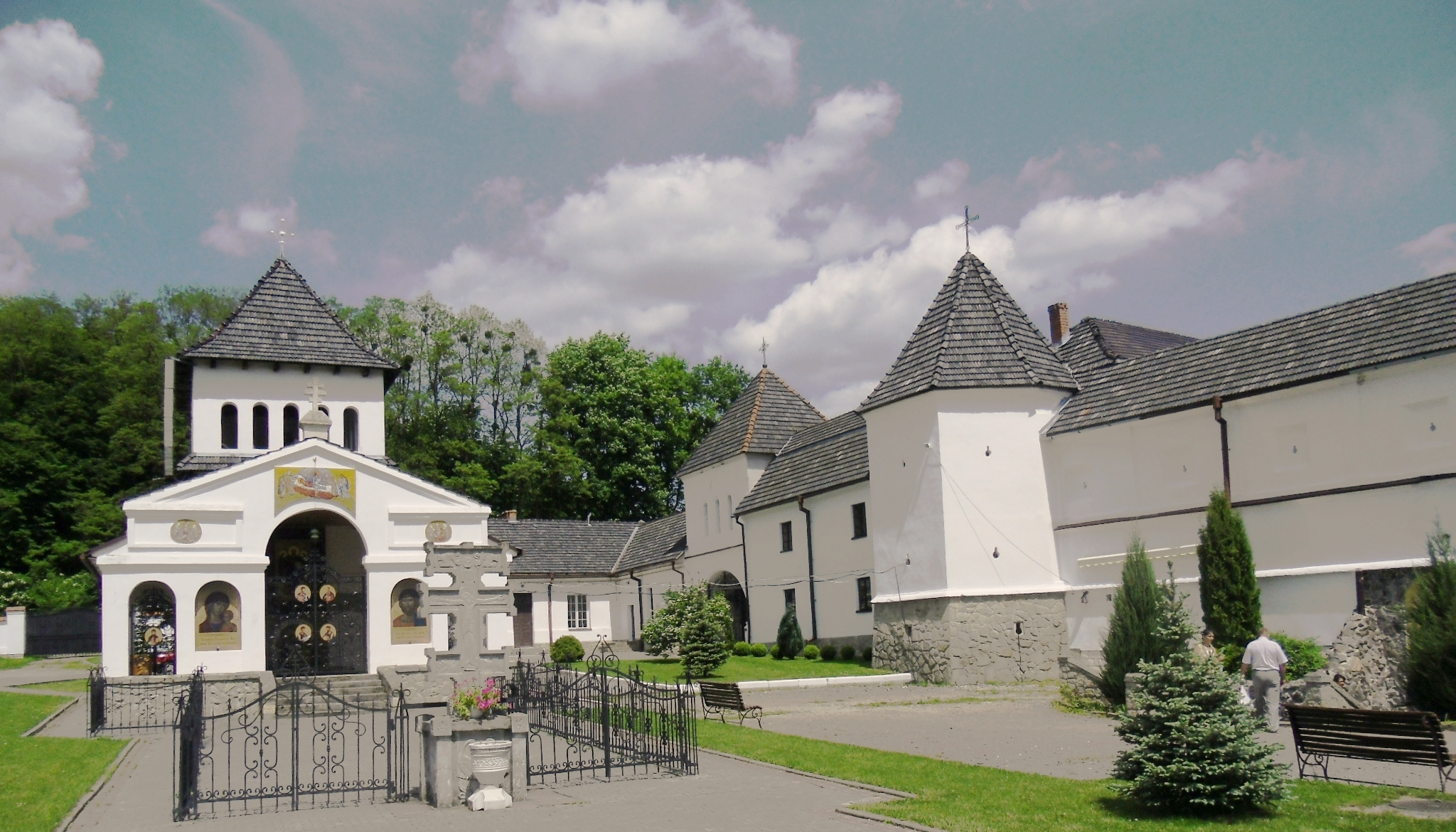
- Univ Holy Dormition Lavra of the Studite Rule
- Abbreviation: M.S.U.
- Formation: 1898; 128 years ago
- Founder: Andrey Sheptytsky
- Type: Catholic religious order
- Headquarters: Univ Lavra, Univ, Lviv Oblast, Ukraine
- Hegumen: Josaphat Voytek
- Parent organization: Ukrainian Greek Catholic Church
- Website: studyty.org.ua

The Ukrainian Studites (Ukrainian: Студити), formally the Monks of the Studite Rule (Latin: Monachi e Regula Studitarum; Ukrainian: Монахи Студитського Уставу, romanized: Monakhy Studytskoho Ustavu; abbreviated MSU) are a monastic order of the Ukrainian Greek Catholic Church.

== History ==
The Studite rule was developed at the Stoudios monastery of Constantinople, from the 5th century onward, especially by Saint Theodore the Studite (760–826). The rule was brought to Kievan Rus in the 11th century by Saint Theodosius of Kiev. In the 17th century all Ukrainian monasteries were united in the Order of Saint Basil the Great, following a path similar to that taken by Western Rite monasticism. With the dire situation of Ukrainian monasticism and the reform of the Basilian Order in the end of the 19th century, Metropolitan Andrey Sheptytsky decided to also reintroduce monasticism based on the Studite rule. By the beginning of the 20th century the first monastery was established and in 1919 moved into the Holy Dormition Lavra in Univ a former Basilian monastery which at that time served as the residence of the Metropolitan. Fr Lev Gillet was, for a short time, a member of this community. Before the development of the monastery was interrupted by Soviets in 1939 there were 225 Studite monks in eight monasteries. Between 1908 and 1924, there was even a Studite Monastery located at Kamenica, located in the Ukrainian Greek Catholic farming settlement near Čelinac, in an otherwise overwhelmingly Serbian Orthodox region of Bosnia Herzegovina.

The Communists attempted to destroy this particular branch of the Ukrainian church, in 1946 they forcefully subjected it to the Moscow Patriarchate and the Univ Lavra was turned into a concentration camp for Greek Catholic clergy who openly refused to serve them and renounce their loyalty to the Pope. In 1947 the Archimandrite of the Studite monks, Blessed Clement Sheptytsky was arrested and martyred in Siberia in 1951. Many monks were arrested and some were deported. The Studite monks in Ukraine were forced into the underground where they secretly served the Catacomb Church. A small group of monks, who during the war ended up in Western Europe, emigrated to Canada where they established the Holy Dormition Monastery in Woodstock, Ontario in 1951. When in 1963 Major Archbishop Joseph Slipyj was released from the Soviet Gulags he took the Studite monks under his personal patronage and established the Studion monastery of St Theodore the Studite in the Papal summer residence of Castelgandolfo. In 1978 Lubomyr Husar, the future Major Archbishop of Kyiv and Halych, became the Archimandrite of the Studites outside of Ukraine.

With the collapse of the Soviet Union the Studite reestablished their monasteries in Ukraine. On Christmas Eve of 1991 the bells of the Univ Lavra tolled for the first time in half a century, that night also announcing the rebirth of Ukraine.

Today, there are 75 Studite monks in eight monasteries. The Studites are known for opting to preserve all the Eastern Rite traditions in the Ukrainian Catholic Church, and run a successful publishing house, 'Svichado' (Ukrainian: Свічадо). They are also heavily involved in the collection and preservation of Greek Catholic church art, including icons, wooden sculptures, tapestries and metal work.

== Notable members ==
- Lubomyr Husar
- Leonid Feodorov
- Klymentiy Sheptytsky
- Nykanor Deyneha
- Jonáš Maxim

== See also ==
- Byzantine Discalced Carmelites
- Order of Saint Basil the Great
