= Żmijowiska, Podkarpackie Voivodeship =

Żmijowiska
- Village
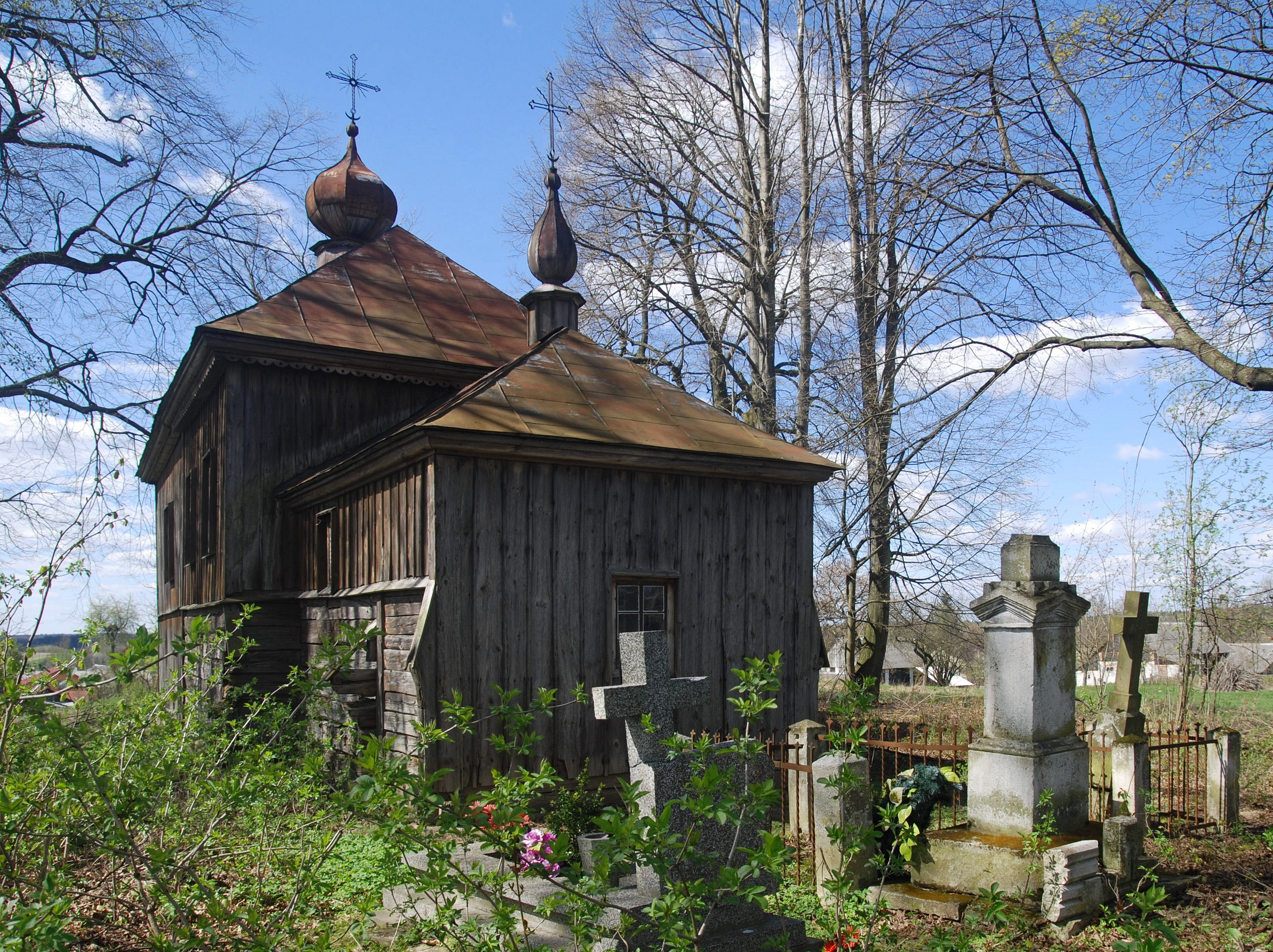
- Former Greek Catholic church

- Location within Poland
- Coordinates: 50°1′N 23°11′E
- Country: Poland
- Voivodeship: Subcarpathian
- County: Lubaczów
- Gmina: Wielkie Oczy

Żmijowiska [ʐmʲijɔˈvʲiska] is a village in the administrative district of Gmina Wielkie Oczy, within Lubaczów County, Subcarpathian Voivodeship, in south-eastern Poland, close to the border with Ukraine.

== History ==
In 1890, the village belonged to the Jaworów County of the Kingdom of Galicia and Lodomeria of the Austro-Hungarian Empire. The village had 117 houses and 606 inhabitants, of which 487 were Greek Catholics, 103 Roman Catholics and 16 Jews. The local Greek Catholic parish belonged to the Jaworów Deanery of the Przemyśl Eparchy.

In 1939, the village had 860 residents, including 630 Ukrainian Greek Catholics, 180 Ukrainian Roman Catholics, 20 Poles and 30 Jews. The village was part of the gmina of Wielkie Oczy in the Jaworów County of the Lwów Voivodeship.

At the end of September 1939, the village was occupied by the Red Army. On November 27, 1939, by a resolution of the Presidium of the Supreme Soviet of the Ukrainian SSR, the village, along with the county, was included in the newly formed Lviv Oblast, and on January 17, 1940, it became part of the Krakovets Raion (District). In June 1941, with the beginning of the Operation Barbarossa, the village was occupied by the Germans. In July 1944, Soviet troops took over the village, and in October 1944, the village was transferred from the Lviv Oblast to Poland. Ukrainians were resettled to the USSR but resisted within the ranks of the Ukrainian underground. The remainder of the Ukrainians were deported to former eastern territories of Germany in 1947 as part of the Operation Vistula.
