= Opilsko =

Village in Lviv Oblast, Ukraine

Opilsko Опільсько
- Village
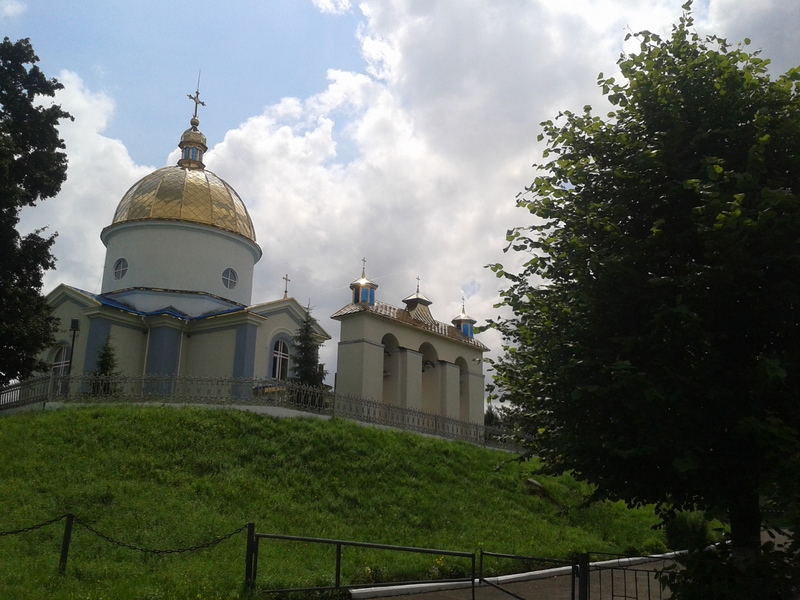
- A church in Opilsko

- Location in Lviv Oblast Location in Ukraine
- Coordinates: 50°29′49″N 24°12′43″E
- Country: Ukraine
- Oblast: Lviv Oblast
- Raion: Sheptytskyi Raion
- Hromada: Sokal urban hromada
- First mentioned: 1440

Population (2001)
  - Total: 623
- Time zone: UTC+2 (EET)
  - Summer (DST): UTC+3 (EEST)
- Postal code: 80028
- Area code: +380 3257

Opilsko (Ukrainian: Опільсько) is a village in Sheptytskyi Raion, Lviv Oblast, western Ukraine. It is part of the Sokal urban hromada, with the administrative centre in the city of Sokal. According to the 2001 Ukrainian census, the village had a population of 623.

== Geography ==
Opilsko is located in the northern part of Lviv Oblast, near the border with Poland. The village lies on flat terrain within the basin of the Western Bug River and is surrounded by agricultural land. Nearby settlements include Boianychi and Trudoliubivka.

== History ==
The settlement was first mentioned in written sources in 1440, during the period when the region formed part of the Kingdom of Poland.

During the Soviet period, in 1951 the village was renamed Peremoha (Ukrainian: Перемога, meaning “Victory”). Following Ukraine's independence, the historical name Opilsko was officially restored in 1989.

== Administrative status ==
Opilsko is one of the rural localities belonging to the Sokal urban hromada, which was established as part of Ukraine's decentralization reform.

== Population ==
According to official census data, the village had 623 inhabitants in 2001, the overwhelming majority of whom identified Ukrainian as their native language.

== Religion and culture ==
The main religious institution in the village is the Church of the Holy Trinity (Ukrainian: Церква Пресвятої Трійці), a parish of the Ukrainian Greek Catholic Church. The church was closed during the Soviet period and reopened in 1990.

== Community activity ==
Residents of Opilsko have taken part in volunteer initiatives supporting the Armed Forces of Ukraine during the Russo-Ukrainian War, including fundraising for equipment and drones.

== Notable people ==
- Vasyl Khoma (1916–1941) – regional leader of the Organization of Ukrainian Nationalists in Sokal District.
- Ihor Rantsya (born 1978) – bishop of the Ukrainian Catholic Eparchy of Saint Volodymyr the Great of Paris.
