= Eastern Catholicism in Belgium =

Eastern Catholic rites in Belgium

- Language(s): Dutch, French, various liturgical languages
- Denomination: Catholic Church
- Tradition: Eastern Christianity (various)

Administration
- Diocese: Eparchy of Saint Vladimir the Great of Paris (Ukrainian Greek Catholic only)

Eastern Catholicism in Belgium refers to various forms of Eastern Catholicism present in Belgium, mostly immigrant communities. There are several churches where eastern rites are celebrated, often bi-ritual Latin-Eastern churches.

== Chaldean Catholics ==
As of 2014, there were some 1500 Chaldean Catholics living in Brussels. In 2016, Belgium as a whole had around 3000 Chaldean Catholics. In February 2024, a married Chaldean Catholic man was ordained to the priesthood in Belgium, the first Belgian Chaldean Catholic priest to be ordained in Belgium itself.

== Byzantine Catholics ==
There is a notable community of Ukrainian Greek Catholics in Antwerp, who celebrate Divine Liturgy in the Saint-Michael and Saint-Peter Church and St. Andrew's Church. They are under the jurisdiction of the Eparchy of Saint Vladimir the Great of Paris.

There is also a Melkite Catholic parish in Brussels.

== Chevetogne Abbey ==
The Chevetogne Abbey is a Benedictine abbey in Belgium that mixes Eastern and Western traditions.

== See also ==
- Catholic Church in Belgium
- Religion in Belgium
- Eastern Catholic Churches
- Eastern Christianity
