= Dumy =

Dumy can refer to:

- Dumy, Poland, a village in south-eastern Poland.
- Dumy, the plural of duma (epic), a sung epic poem that originated in Ukraine in the 16th century.
