= Ihor Rantsya =

Ukrainian Greek Catholic bishop from France (born 1978)

His Grace, The Most Reverend Ihor Rantsya
- Eparchial Bishop of Eparchy of Saint Volodymyr the Great of Paris
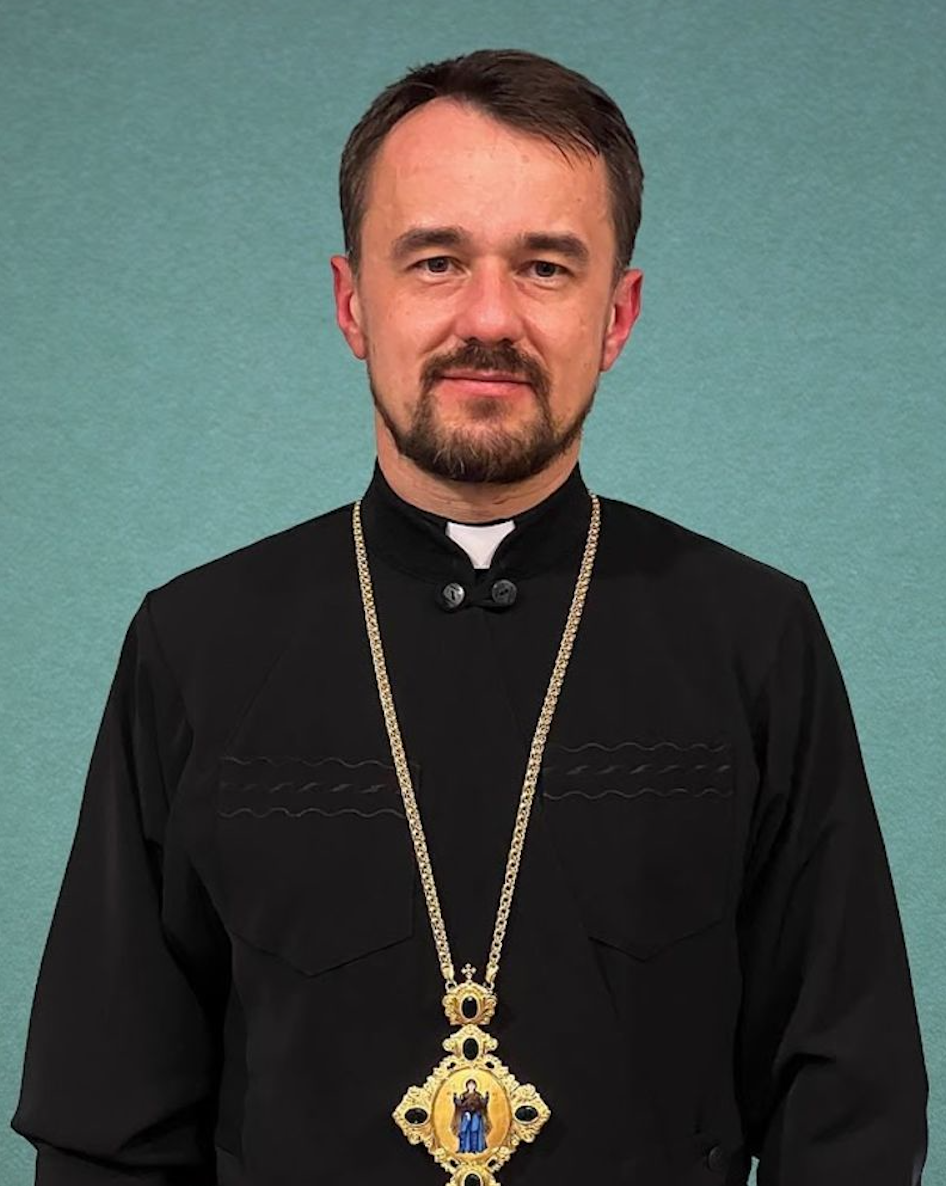
- Church: Ukrainian Greek Catholic Church
- Appointed: 1 October 2025
- Installed: 18 December 2025
- Predecessor: Hlib Lonchyna (apostolic administrator)

Orders
- Ordination: 29 March 2015 by Ihor Vozniak
- Consecration: 18 December 2025 by Sviatoslav Shevchuk, Borys Gudziak, Hlib Lonchyna

Personal details
- Born: 8 March 1978 (age 48) Peremoha, Lviv Oblast, Ukrainian SSR
- Education: Ivan Franko National University of Lviv; Ukrainian Catholic University; Catholic Institute of Paris
- Motto: Ukrainian: Під покровом Марії, у світлі Ісуса; Under the protection of Mary, in the light of Jesus
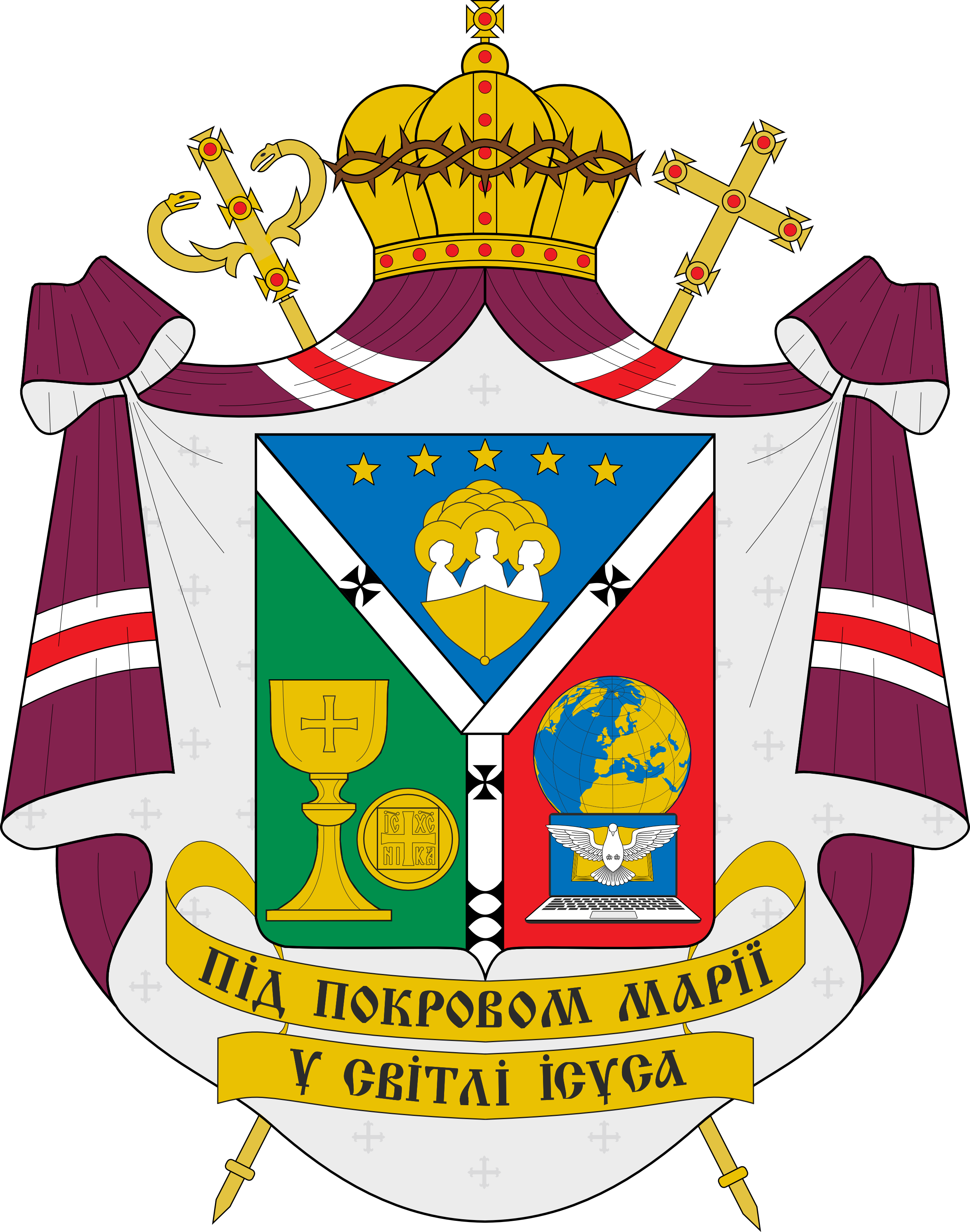
- Coat of arms

Ihor Rantsya (Ukrainian: Ігор Ранця; born 8 March 1978) is a Ukrainian Greek Catholic hierarch, currently serving as the Eparchial Bishop of Ukrainian Catholic Eparchy of Saint Volodymyr the Great of Paris, overseeing faithful in France, Belgium, Switzerland, the Netherlands and Luxembourg. He was appointed by Pope Leo XIV on 1 October 2025 and consecrated on 18 December 2025.

== Early life and education ==
Ihor Rantsya was born on 8 March 1978 in Opilsko, present-day Sheptytskyi Raion, Lviv Oblast, then part of the Ukrainian SSR. He completed his secondary education locally before enrolling at the Ivan Franko National University of Lviv, where he earned both a master's degree and a doctorate in geography and subsequently worked as a lecturer.

In 2008, he entered the Lviv Theological Seminary and simultaneously studied theology at the Ukrainian Catholic University, earning a master's degree in theology. From 2014 to 2015, he continued his studies at the Catholic Institute of Paris, obtaining a licentiate in ecumenical theology and completing doctoral research in theology.

== Priesthood ==
Rantsya was ordained a deacon on 19 June 2014, and a priest on 29 March 2015 by Ihor Vozniak in Paris for service in France, but with the incardination into the Archeparchy of Lviv.

Following ordination, he served in pastoral ministry within the Ukrainian Catholic Eparchy of Saint Volodymyr the Great of Paris. He was rector of All Saints Parish in Vincennes (2016–2019), parish vicar, and later administrator of the cathedral parish in Paris. He coordinated the eparchial commission for ecumenism and interreligious relations and served on the Pastoral Council of the Patriarchal Curia of the Ukrainian Greek Catholic Church.

On 21 March 2022, he was appointed protosyncellus (vicar general) of the Paris eparchy.

== Episcopacy ==
On 1 October 2025, the Holy See announced that Pope Leo XIV had appointed Rantsya as bishop of the Ukrainian Catholic Eparchy of Saint Volodymyr the Great of Paris, filling the vacancy after the previous bishop, Borys Gudziak, was transferred and Hlib Lonchyna served as apostolic administrator.

He was consecrated as bishop on 18 December 2025 at the Church of Saint‑Sulpice in Paris, with Major Archbishop Sviatoslav Shevchuk as principal consecrator, and Archbishop Borys Gudziak and Bishop Hlib Lonchyna as co‑consecrators. On the same day, he was formally installed as eparch.

As eparch, Rantsya has emphasized pastoral care for the Ukrainian diaspora, promotion of ecumenical dialogue, youth engagement, and strengthening of eparchial educational programs. He has actively participated in European Catholic networks and met with French and Belgian church authorities to foster cooperation among Eastern Catholic communities.

== See also ==
- Ukrainian Greek Catholic Church
- Eastern Catholic Churches
