= Bihale =

- Village
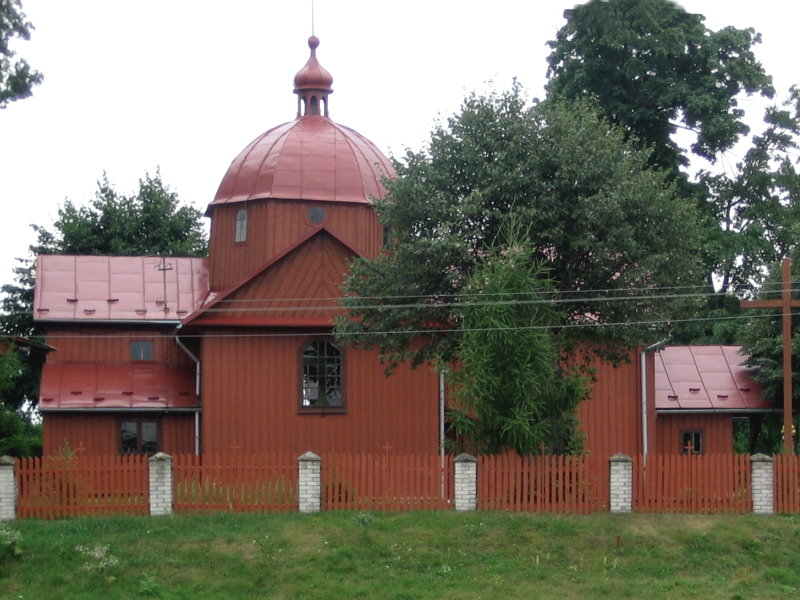
- Greek Catholic church

- Location within Poland
- Coordinates: 50°5′N 23°2′E
- Country: Poland
- Voivodeship: Subcarpathian
- County: Lubaczów
- Gmina: Wielkie Oczy

Bihale [bʲiˈxalɛ] is a village in the administrative district of Gmina Wielkie Oczy, within Lubaczów County, Subcarpathian Voivodeship, in south-eastern Poland, close to the border with Ukraine.
