= Cathedral of the Intercession of the Mother of God and of St. Andrew =

Cathedral in Bavaria, Germany

Coordinates: 48.106°N 11.565°E

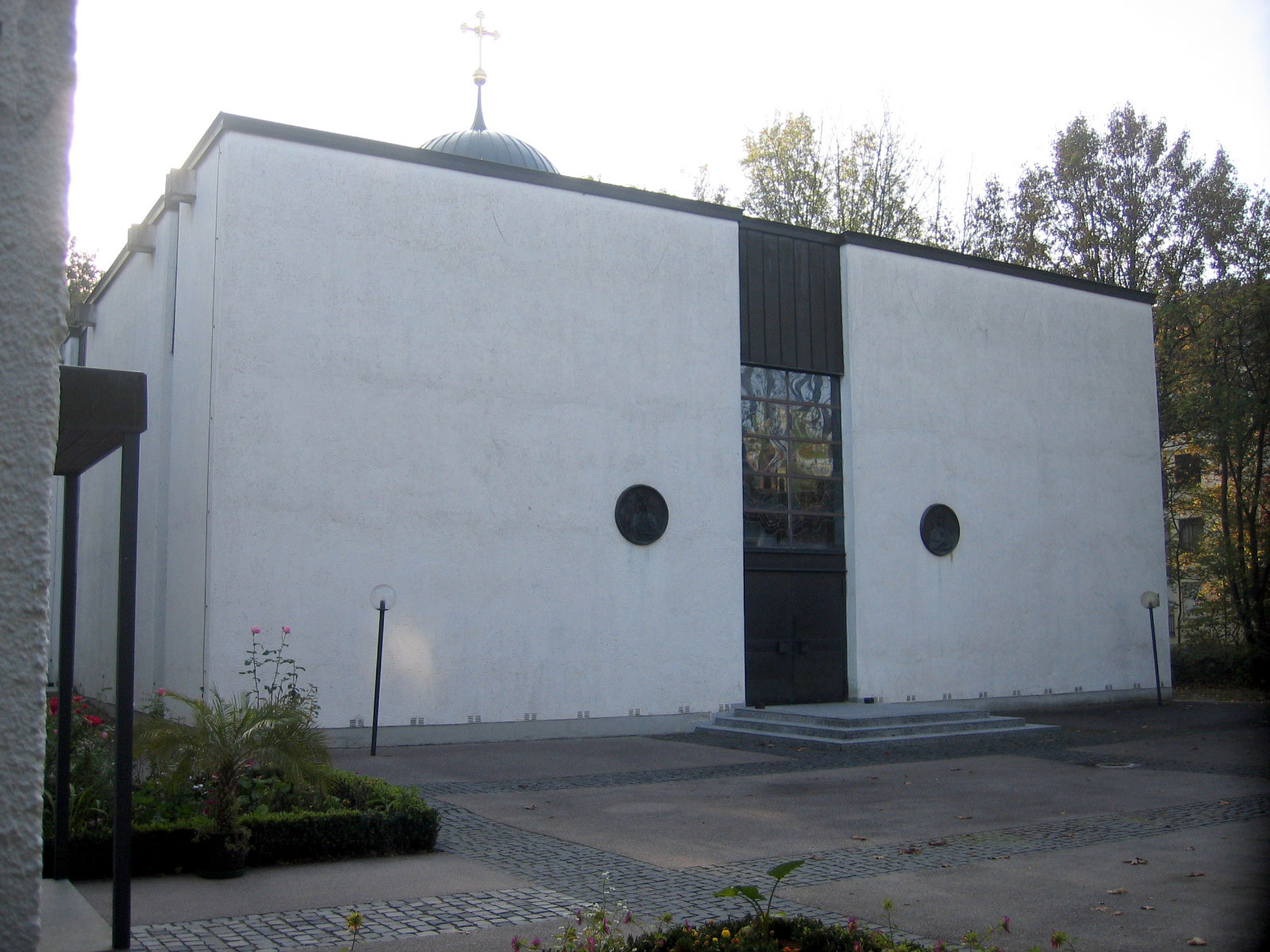
The cathedral

The Cathedral of the Intercession of the Mother of God and of St. Andrew the Firstcalled (Ukrainian: Собор Покрови Пресвятої Богородиці та Св. Андрія Первозванного, German: Kathedrale Maria Schutz und St. Andreas) is a Catholic cathedral of the Ukrainian rite located in Munich, Germany.

It is the Ukrainian Greek Catholic cathedral of the Apostolic Exarchate in Germany and Scandinavia for the Ukrainians (Exarchatus Apostolicus Germaniae and Scandiae) that was created in 1959 by decision of Pope John XXIII through the bull "Cum ob immane."
