= Kobylnica Wołoska =

- Village
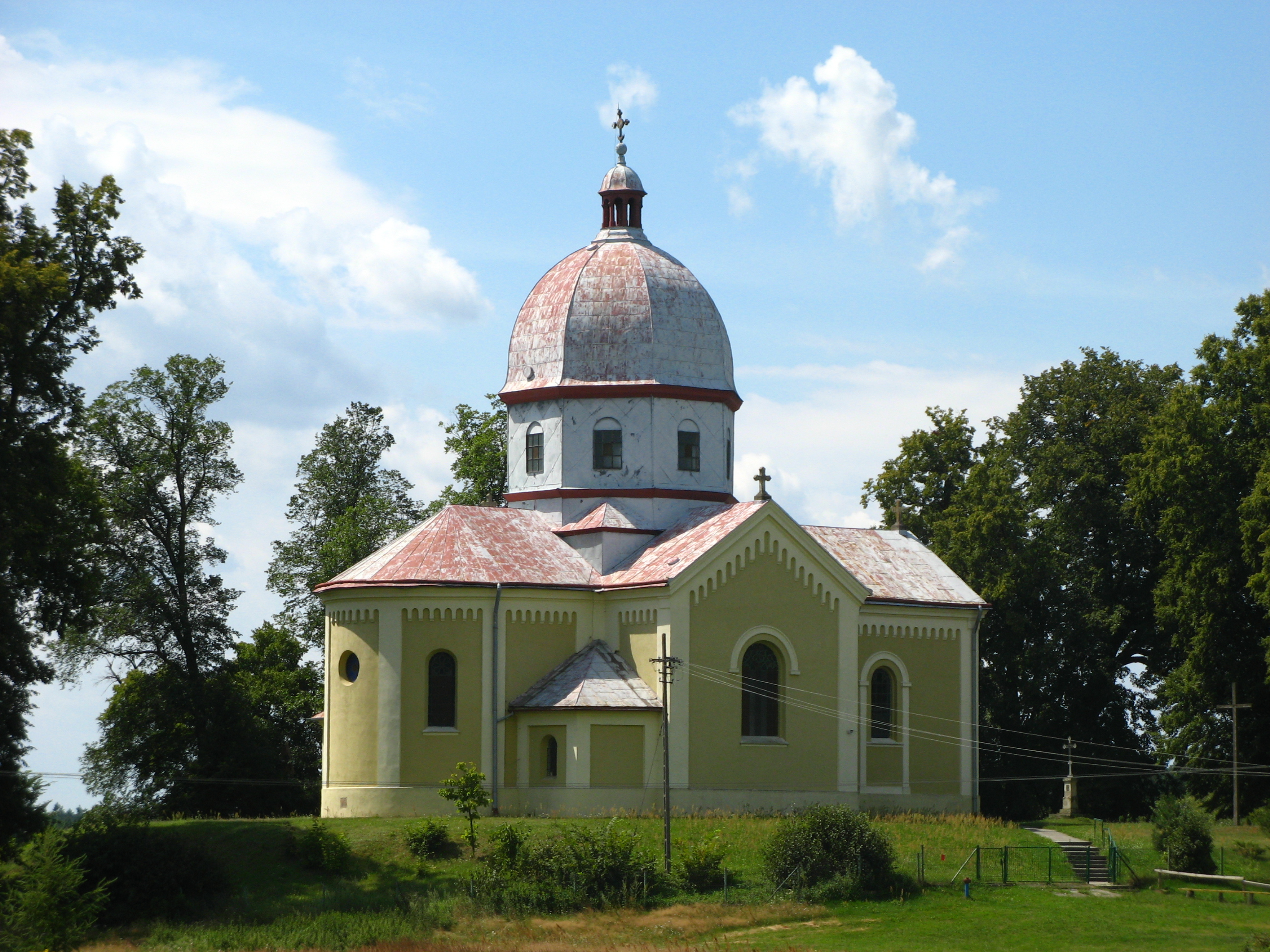
- Greek Catholic church of Saint Dmitry
- Interactive map of Kobylnica Wołoska
- Location within Poland
- Coordinates: 50°0′15″N 23°6′17″E
- Country: Poland
- Voivodeship: Subcarpathian
- County: Lubaczów
- Gmina: Wielkie Oczy
- Population: 380

Kobylnica Wołoska [kɔbɨlˈɲit͡sa vɔˈwɔska] is a village in the administrative district of Gmina Wielkie Oczy, within Lubaczów County, Subcarpathian Voivodeship, in south-eastern Poland, close to the border with Ukraine.

Here was born Bishop Petro Kryk, Apostolic Exarch of Germany and Scandinavia for the Ukrainians.
