= Zagrobla =

- Settlement
- Location within Poland
- Coordinates: 50°5′11″N 23°4′56″E
- Country: Poland
- Voivodeship: Subcarpathian
- County: Lubaczów
- Gmina: Wielkie Oczy

Zagrobla [zaˈɡrɔbla] is a settlement in the administrative district of Gmina Wielkie Oczy, within Lubaczów County, Subcarpathian Voivodeship, in south-eastern Poland, close to the border with Ukraine.
