= Volodymyr Malanczuk =

His Grace Volodymyr Malanczuk, C.Ss.R.
- Apostolic Exarch of France
- Church: Ukrainian Greek Catholic Church
- In office: 19 February 1961 – 27 November 1982
- Predecessor: New creation
- Successor: Michel Hrynchyshyn

Orders
- Ordination: 26 April 1931 (Priest) by Andrey Sheptytsky
- Consecration: 19 February 1961 (Bishop) by Maxim Hermaniuk

Personal details
- Born: Volodymyr Malanczuk; 20 August 1904 Bazar, Austro-Hungarian Empire
- Died: 29 September 1990 (aged 86) Winnipeg, Manitoba, Canada

Volodymyr Malanczuk, C.Ss.R. (Ukrainian: Володимир Маланчук; 20 August 1904 – 29 September 1990) was a Ukrainian Greek Catholic hierarch in France. He was the first Apostolic Exarch of the new created Apostolic Exarchat of France as titular bishop of Epiphania in Syria from 1960 to 1982.

== Biography ==
Born in Bazar, Austro-Hungarian Empire (present day – Ternopil Oblast, Ukraine) in the Ukrainian peasant family in 1904. He professed as Redemptorist on 21 September 1925 and was ordained a priest on 26 April 1931 by Metropolitan Andrey Sheptytsky. He worked as Vicar General for the Ukrainians in the United Kingdom from 1949 to 1951 and as Provincial Superior of the Ukrainian Redemptorists in Canada from 1951 to 1961.

He was appointed by the Holy See an Apostolic Exarch of the new created Apostolic Exarchat of France for the Ukrainians on 22 July 1960. He was consecrated to the Episcopate on 19 February 1961. The principal consecrator was Archbishop Maxim Hermaniuk, and the principal co-consecrators were Bishop Ambrose Senyshyn and Bishop Isidore Borecky in Winnipeg, Manitoba. Bishop Malanczuk retired on 27 November 1982.

He participated in the Second Vatican Council as a Council Father in 1960th. He died in Winnipeg on 29 September 1990.

Catholic Church titles
New title	Apostolic Exarch of France for the Ukrainians; 1960–1982	Succeeded by Michel Hrynchyshyn
