= Michel Hrynchyshyn =

Michel Hrynchyshyn C.Ss.R.
- Apostolic Exarch of France
- Church: Ukrainian Greek Catholic Church
- See: Apostolic Exarchate of France
- In office: 27 November 1982 – 21 July 2012
- Predecessor: Volodymyr Malanczuk
- Successor: Borys Gudziak
- Previous posts: Titular Eparch of Zygris (1982-2012); Apostolic Administrator of Apostolic Exarchate of Great Britain (1987-1989)

Orders
- Ordination: 25 May 1952 by Maxim Hermaniuk
- Consecration: 30 January 1983 by Josyf Slipyj

Personal details
- Born: 18 February 1929 Buchanan, Saskatchewan, Dominion of Canada, British Empire
- Died: 12 November 2012 (aged 83) Vincennes, Île-de-France, France

The Rt Revd Michel Hrynchyshyn C.Ss.R. (18 February 1929 – 12 November 2012) was the apostolic exarch of the Apostolic Exarchate in France, Benelux and Switzerland for the Ukrainians from when he was consecrated bishop on 30 January 1983 until his resignation in 2012. He was appointed by Pope John Paul II on 21 October 1982. He also was an advisor to the Congregation for the Oriental Churches and a member of Le conseil d'Eglises chrétiennes en France (CECEF). Hrynchyshyn was born in Buchanan, Saskatchewan.

Catholic Church titles
Preceded by Volodymyr Malanczuk, C.Ss.R.	Apostolic Exarchate in France, Benelux and Switzerland for the Ukrainians; 1982—2012	Succeeded by Borys Gudziak
Preceded by Augustine Hornyak	Apostolic Exarch for Ukrainians in Great Britain (Apostolic Administrator); 1987—1989	Succeeded by Michael Kuchmiak, C.S.S.R.
Preceded by Platon Kornyljak	Apostolic Exarch for Ukrainians in Germany and Scandinavia (Apostolic Administrator); 1996—2001	Succeeded by Petro Kryk
