= Gmina Wielkie Oczy =

Gmina Wielkie Oczy Wielkie Oczy Commune
- Gmina
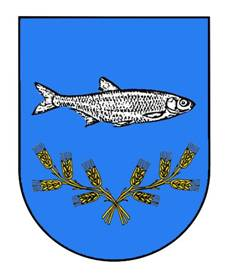
- Coat of arms
- Interactive map of Gmina Wielkie Oczy
- Coordinates (Wielkie Oczy): 50°1′22″N 23°9′44″E
- Country: Poland
- Voivodeship: Subcarpathian
- County: Lubaczów
- Seat: Wielkie Oczy

Area
  - Total: 146.49 km^{2} (56.56 sq mi)

Population (2013)
  - Total: 3,904
  - Density: 26.65/km^{2} (69.02/sq mi)
- Website: wielkieoczy.info.pl

Gmina Wielkie Oczy is a rural gmina (administrative district) in Lubaczów County, Subcarpathian Voivodeship, in south-eastern Poland, on the border with Ukraine. Its seat is the village of Wielkie Oczy, which lies approximately 17 kilometres (11 mi) south of Lubaczów and 83 km (52 mi) east of the regional capital Rzeszów.

The gmina covers an area of 146.49 square kilometres (56.6 sq mi), and as of 2006 its total population is 3,929 (3,904 in 2013).

== Villages ==
Gmina Wielkie Oczy contains the villages and settlements of Bihale, Czopy, Dumy, Gieregi, Kobylnica Ruska, Kobylnica Wołoska, Łukawiec, Majdan Lipowiecki, Mielnik, Niwa, Podłozy, Potok Jaworowski, Skolin, Sople, Szczeble, Tarnawskie, Wielkie Oczy, Wola, Wólka Żmijowska, Zagrobla and Żmijowiska.

== Neighbouring gminas ==
Gmina Wielkie Oczy is bordered by the gminas of Laszki and Radymno. It also borders Ukraine.
