= Ivan Kuziv =

Ukrainian priest (1857–1918)

- Іван Кузів
- Born: 1857; Horutsko, Austrian Empire
- Died: 29 September 1918 (aged 60–61); Dydiowa, Austria-Hungary

Ivan Kuziv (Ukrainian: Іван Кузів; 1857 in Horutsko (now Hirske), Austrian Empire – 29 September 1918 in Dydiowa, Austria-Hungary) was a Ukrainian Greek Catholic priest and ethnographer.

== Biography ==
Kuziv studied at Lviv Gymnasium No. 4. He graduated from the Greek Catholic Theological Seminary. In 1884, he was ordained a priest. Served in the parish of the village of Dydiowa, Bieszczady Powiat (1885–1888, administrator; 1888–1918, pastor). He was the dean of the Zatwarnica deanery (1918).

Father Kuziv's house was visited by Ivan Franko (who called the priest "an outstanding ethnographer and a good expert on the Boikos"), Demian Hladylovych, Volodymyr Hnatiuk, Fedir Vovk, and Osyp Makovei. He corresponded with Ivan Franko.

== Family ==
Fr. Ivan Kuziv's wife died a few weeks after the marriage. He lived with his mother-in-law and her three daughters.

== Works ==
Author of the article "Life, existence, customs and manners of the mountain people" (1889, Zoria).
