= Dydiowa =

- Village
- Location within Poland
- Coordinates: 49°10′59″N 22°44′46″E
- Country: Poland
- Voivodeship: Subcarpathian
- County: Bieszczady
- Gmina: Lutowiska
- Population: 0

Dydiowa [dɨˈdjɔva] is a former village in the administrative district of Gmina Lutowiska, within Bieszczady County, Subcarpathian Voivodeship, in south-eastern Poland, on the border with Ukraine.

The village of Dydiowa was founded in 1529 by the Cracow voivode Peter Kmita. In 1589 a church was built in the village.

== Notable residents ==
- Ivan Kuziv (1857–1918), Ukrainian Greek Catholic priest and ethnographer
