= Czopy =

- Village
- Location within Poland
- Coordinates: 50°4′37″N 23°7′12″E
- Country: Poland
- Voivodeship: Subcarpathian
- County: Lubaczów
- Gmina: Wielkie Oczy

Czopy [ˈt͡ʂɔpɨ] is a village in the administrative district of Gmina Wielkie Oczy, within Lubaczów County, Subcarpathian Voivodeship, in south-eastern Poland, close to the border with Ukraine.
