= Wólka Żmijowska =

- Village
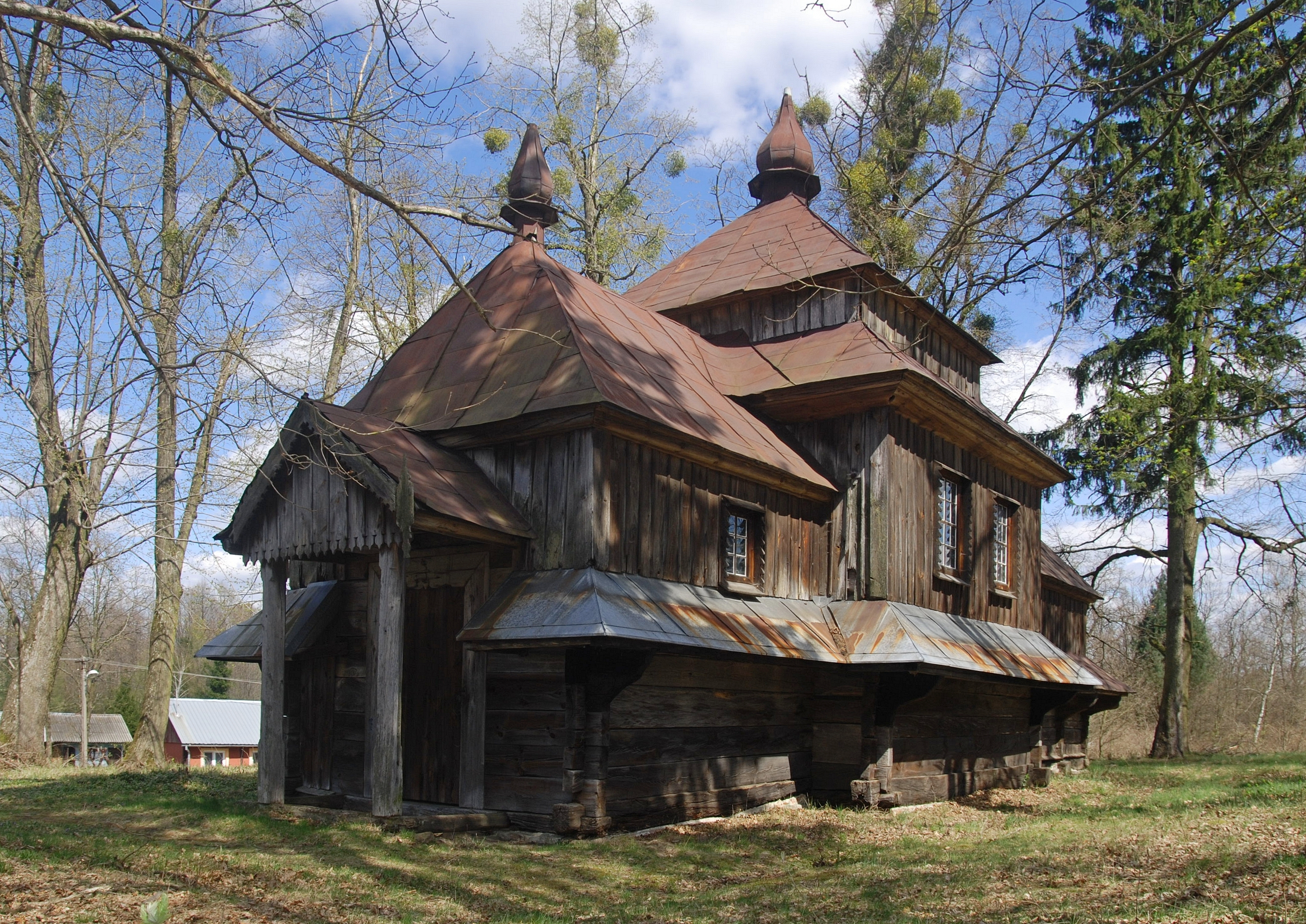
- Wólka Żmijowska

- Location within Poland
- Coordinates: 50°3′N 23°12′E
- Country: Poland
- Voivodeship: Subcarpathian
- County: Lubaczów
- Gmina: Wielkie Oczy

Wólka Żmijowska [ˈvulka ʐmʲiˈjɔfska] is a village in the administrative district of Gmina Wielkie Oczy, within Lubaczów County, Subcarpathian Voivodeship, in south-eastern Poland, close to the border with Ukraine.
