= St. Volodymyr the Great's Cathedral, Paris =

Cathedral church in Paris, France

Coordinates: 48°51′17″N 2°19′51″E

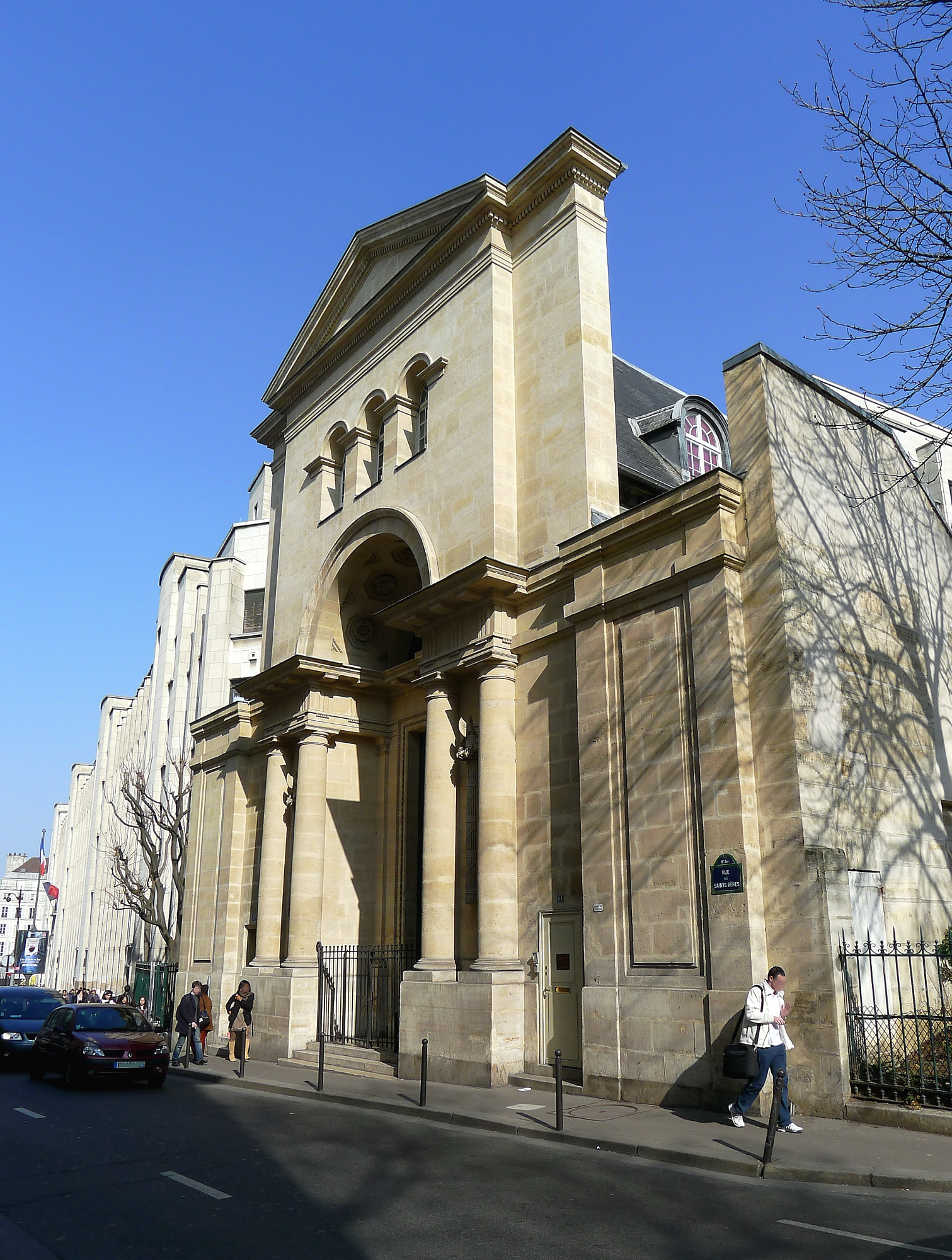
Cathedral of Saint Volodymyr the Great

The Cathedral of Saint Volodymyr the Great (French: Cathédrale Saint-Volodymyr-le-Grand, Ukrainian: Собор святого Володимира Великого), in the 6th arrondissement of Paris, is the cathedral church of the Ukrainian Catholic Eparchy of Saint Volodymyr the Great of Paris in France. Borys Gudziak served as the eparchial bishop of the eparchy from 2012 to 2019. The position has been vacant since Gudziak's appointment as Metropolitan-Archbishop of the Ukrainian Catholic Archeparchy of Philadelphia, with Bishop Hlib Lonchyna serving as the eparchy's apostolic administrator since 2019.

== See also ==
- Catholic Church
- Ukrainian Greek Catholic Church
