= Bohdan Dzyurakh =

Ukrainian Greek Catholic bishop

Bohdan Dzyurakh, C.Ss.R.
- Apostolic Exarch in Germany and Scandinavia for the Ukrainians
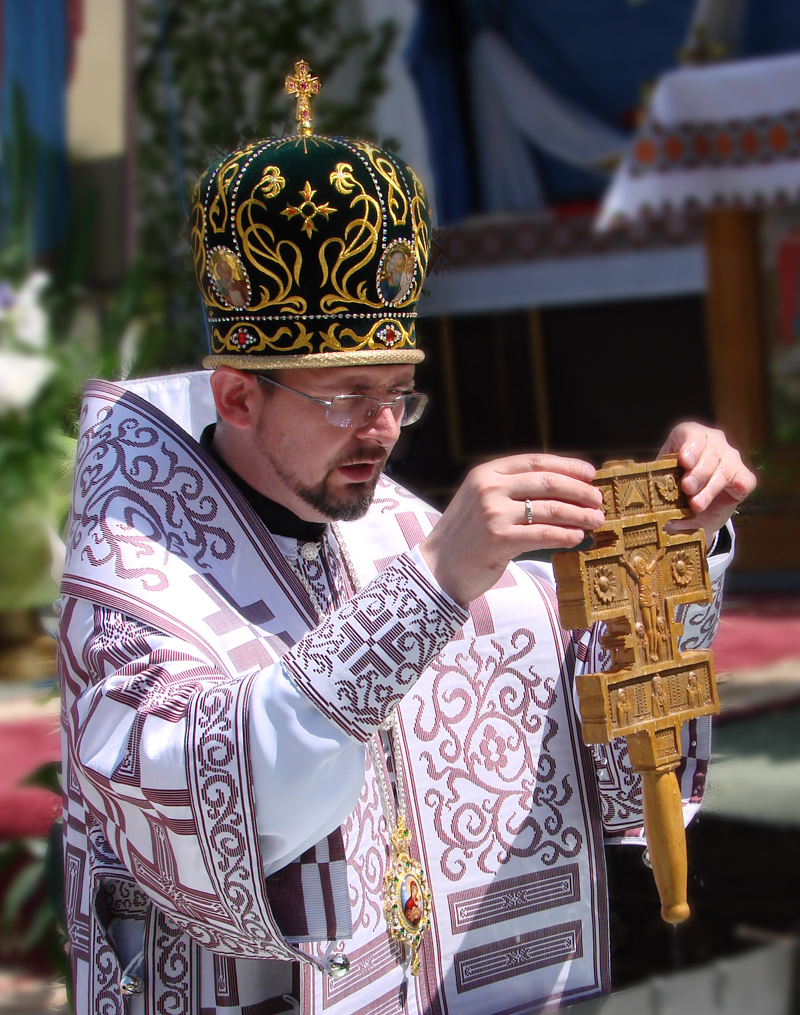
- Church: Ukrainian Greek Catholic Church
- Appointed: 18 February 2021
- Predecessor: Petro Kryk
- Other post: Titular Bishop of Vagada

Orders
- Ordination: 17 March 1991 (Priest)
- Consecration: 15 February 2006 (Bishop)

Personal details
- Born: 20 March 1967 (age 59) Hirske, Lviv Oblast, Ukraine
- Coat of arms

Bishop Bohdan Dzyurakh, C.Ss.R. (b. 1967, Hirske, Lviv Oblast, Ukrainian SSR) is a curial bishop of the Ukrainian Greek Catholic Church and titular bishop of Vagada. He is also head of the Supervisory Council of the Construction of the Patriarchal Center of the UGCC. He was ordained priest on 17 March 1991 and was consecrated bishop on 15 February 2006. On 18 February 2021 Dzyurakh was appointed as head of the Ukrainian Catholic Apostolic Exarchate of Germany and Scandinavia, succeeding the retiring Petro Kryk.
