= Vagada (Numidia) =

Vagada, also known as Vagadensis and Bagatensis, was a town in the Roman-Berber province of Numidia. It was a Roman Catholic diocese.

== Location ==
Vagada was located in the region of Numidia. It has been tentatively identified with the ruins at El-Aira in the modern Constantine Province, Algeria (36° 19' 3" North, 6° 49' 43" East), situated between what was Cirta and Thibilis. Vagada was known to be on the Magerada River. Epigraphic remains have given the name of the town as Bagatensis.

== Bishopric ==
Vagada was also the seat of an ancient Roman Catholic bishopric of the Roman province of Numidia. The only known bishop of this diocese from antiquity is Fulgentius, who took part in the Council of Carthage (484) by the Vandal king Huneric, after which Fulgentius was exiled.

The current titular bishop is Bohdan Dzyurakh, curial bishop of major archbishopric of Kyïv-Halyč who succeeded Robert Camilleri Azzopardi in 2004. Other notable bishops include Paul Bouque (28 May 1934 Appointed – 14 Sep 1955) and Denis James Hart (10 Nov 1997 Appointed – 22 Jun 2001).

Known bishops

- Fulgenzio (fl.484)
- Paul Bouque, (1934–1955)
- Joannes Maria Michael Holterman (1956–1958)
- José Lecuona Labandibar(1958–1997)
- Denis James Hart (1997–2001)
- Robert Camilleri Azzopardi (2001–2004)
- Bohdan Dzyurakh (2005–current)
