= Platon Kornyljak =

His Grace Platon Kornyljak
- Apostolic Exarch in Germany and Scandinavia for the Ukrainians
- Church: Ukrainian Greek Catholic Church
- In office: 7 July 1959 – 16 December 1996
- Predecessor: New creation
- Successor: Michel Hrynchyshyn as Ap. Administrator

Orders
- Ordination: 25 March 1945 (Priest) by Ivan Buchko
- Consecration: 7 July 1959 (Bishop) by Constantine Bohachevsky

Personal details
- Born: Platon Volodyslav Kornyljak; 6 September 1920 Stebni, Kingdom of Romania (present day Chernivtsi Oblast, Ukraine)
- Died: 1 November 2000 (aged 80) Munich, Germany

Platon Volodyslav Kornyljak or Kornylyak (Ukrainian: Платон Володислав Корниляк; 6 September 1920 – 1 November 2000) was a Ukrainian Greek Catholic hierarch in Germany. He was the first Apostolic Exarch of the new created Apostolic Exarchate in Germany and Scandinavia for the Ukrainians as titular bishop of Castra Martis from 1959 to 1996.

Born in Stebni, Kingdom of Romania (present day – Chernivtsi Oblast, Ukraine) in the Ukrainian peasant family in 1920. He was ordained a priest on 25 March 1945 by Bishop Ivan Buchko. He worked as personal assistant for Archbishop Constantine Bohachevsky in the United States from 1950 to 1952 and the Chancellor for the Apostolic Exarchat in the United States for the Ukrainians from 1952 to 1959.

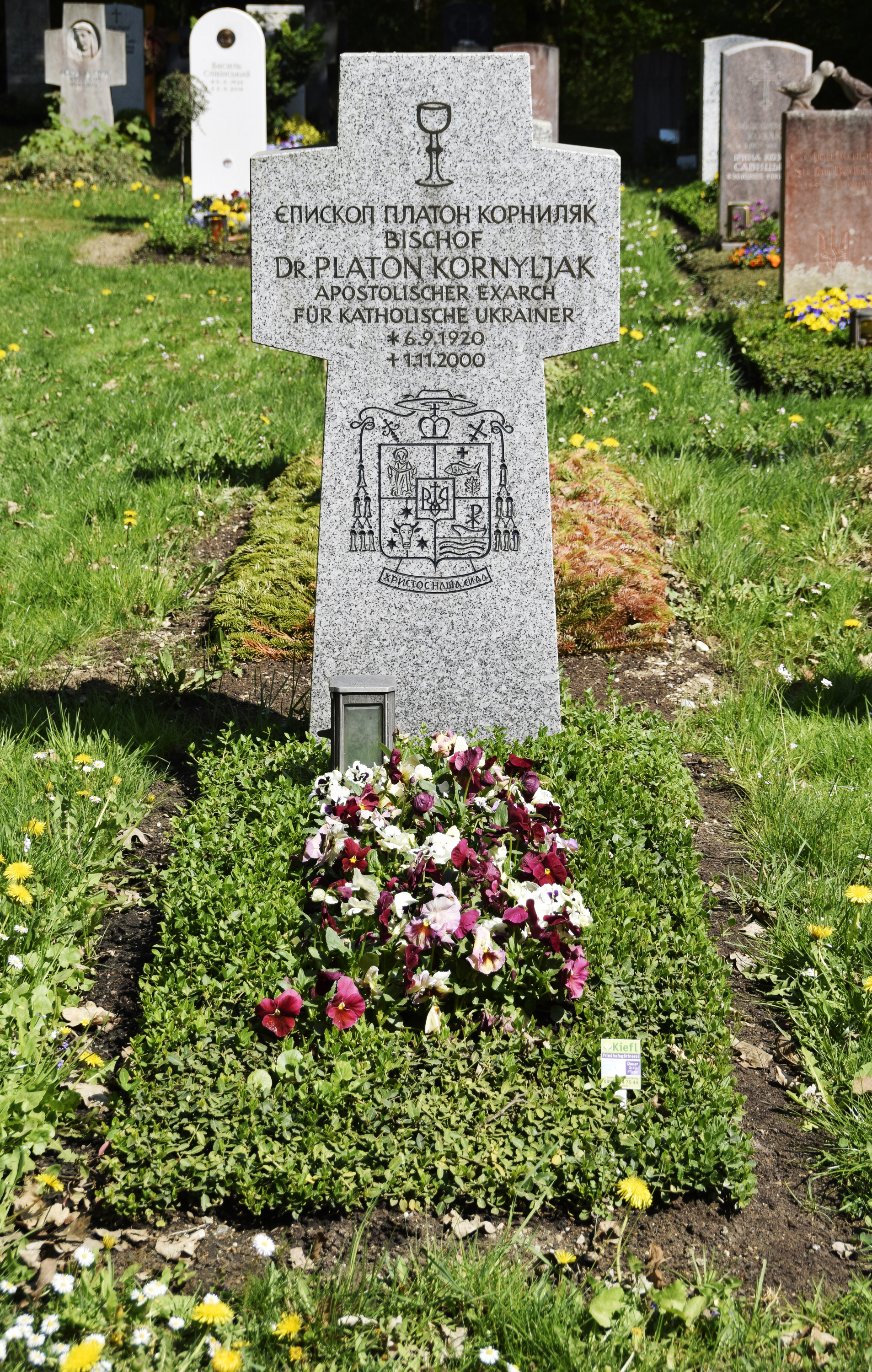
Grave of Platon Kornyljak

He was appointed by the Holy See an Apostolic Exarch of the new created Apostolic Exarchate in Germany and Scandinavia for the Ukrainians (until 1982 only with jurisdiction over Germany) on 17 April 1959. He was consecrated to the Episcopate on 7 July 1959. The principal consecrator was Archbishop Constantine Bohachevsky, and the principal co-consecrators were Bishop Ambrose Senyshyn and Bishop Joseph Michael Schmondiuk in Philadelphia. Bishop Kornyljak retired on 16 December 1996.

He participated in the Second Vatican Council as a Council Father in 1960th. He died in Munich on 1 November 2000, he is buried at Munich Waldfriedhof.

Catholic Church titles
New title	Titular Bishop of Castra Martis; 1959–2000	Succeeded by Petro Kryk
New title	Apostolic Exarch in Germany and Scandinavia for the Ukrainians; 1959–1996	Succeeded by Michel Hrynchyshyn (Apostolic Administrator)
