= Petro Kryk =

Ukrainian-German Greek Catholic bishop

- Emeritus Apostolic Exarch in Germany and Scandinavia for the Ukrainians
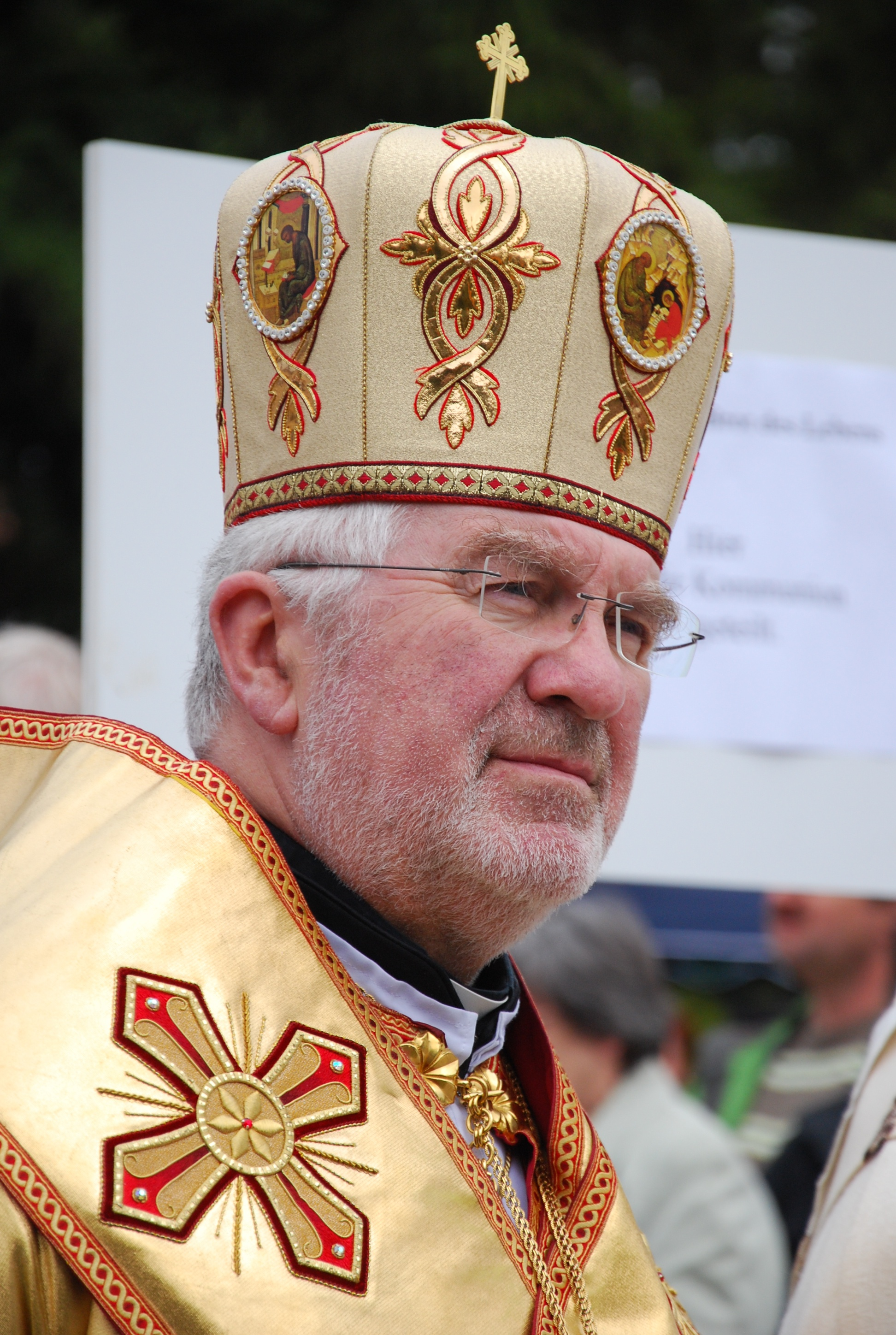
- Church: Ukrainian Greek Catholic Church
- Appointed: 20 November 2000
- Predecessor: Michel Hrynchyshyn (Ap. Administrator)
- Successor: Bohdan Dzyurakh
- Other post(s): Protosyncellus of the Eparchy of Wrocław-Gdańsk (1996–2000); Titular Bishop of Castra Martis (since 2000)

Orders
- Ordination: 6 August 1971 (Priest) by Władysław Miziołek
- Consecration: 3 February 2001 (Bishop) by Jan Martyniak

Personal details
- Born: Petro Kryk; 25 April 1945 (age 80); Kobylnica Wołoska, Rzeszów Voivodeship, Poland
- Coat of arms

Bishop Petro Kryk (Ukrainian: Петро Крик, born 25 April 1945 in Kobylnica Wołoska, Rzeszów Voivodeship (now Podkarpackie Voivodeship), Poland) is a German Ukrainian Greek Catholic hierarch as the emeritus Apostolic Exarch of the Apostolic Exarchate in Germany and Scandinavia for the Ukrainians and the Titular Bishop of Castra Martis from 20 November 2000 until 18 February 2021.

== Life ==
Bishop Kryk was born in the family of Greek-Catholics Hryhoriy and Anna Kryk in 1945, but during Operation Vistula in the 1947, his family was forcibly resettled with another Ukrainians in Poland, from ethnical Ukrainian territories to the Recovered Territories in the northern Poland. After school and lyceum education, he joined the Theological Seminary Hosianum in Olsztyn. He interrupted his theological studies because of compulsory service in the Polish Armed Forces in 1965–1967 and continued theological education in the Metropolitan Theological Seminary in Warsaw.

After this he was ordained as a deacon on 27 June 1971 and as a priest on 6 August 1971. After 24 years of pastoral work for the different Greek-Catholic parishes, in 1996 he was appointed as a protosyncellus of the newly created Ukrainian Catholic Eparchy of Wrocław-Gdańsk.

On 20 November 2000, Kryk was appointed and, on 3 February 2001, was consecrated to the episcopate as Titular Bishop of Castra Martis and the Apostolic Exarch in Germany and Scandinavia for the Ukrainians. The principal consecrator was Metropolitan Jan Martyniak.

Catholic Church titles
Preceded by Platon Kornyljak	Titular Bishop of Castra Martis; 2000–present	Succeeded by Incumbent
Preceded by Michel Hrynchyshyn (Ap. Administrator)	Apostolic Exarch in Germany and Scandinavia for the Ukrainians; 2000–2021	Succeeded by Bohdan Dzyurakh
