= Bazar, Ternopil Oblast =

Rural locality in Ternopil Oblast, Ukraine

Bazar Базар
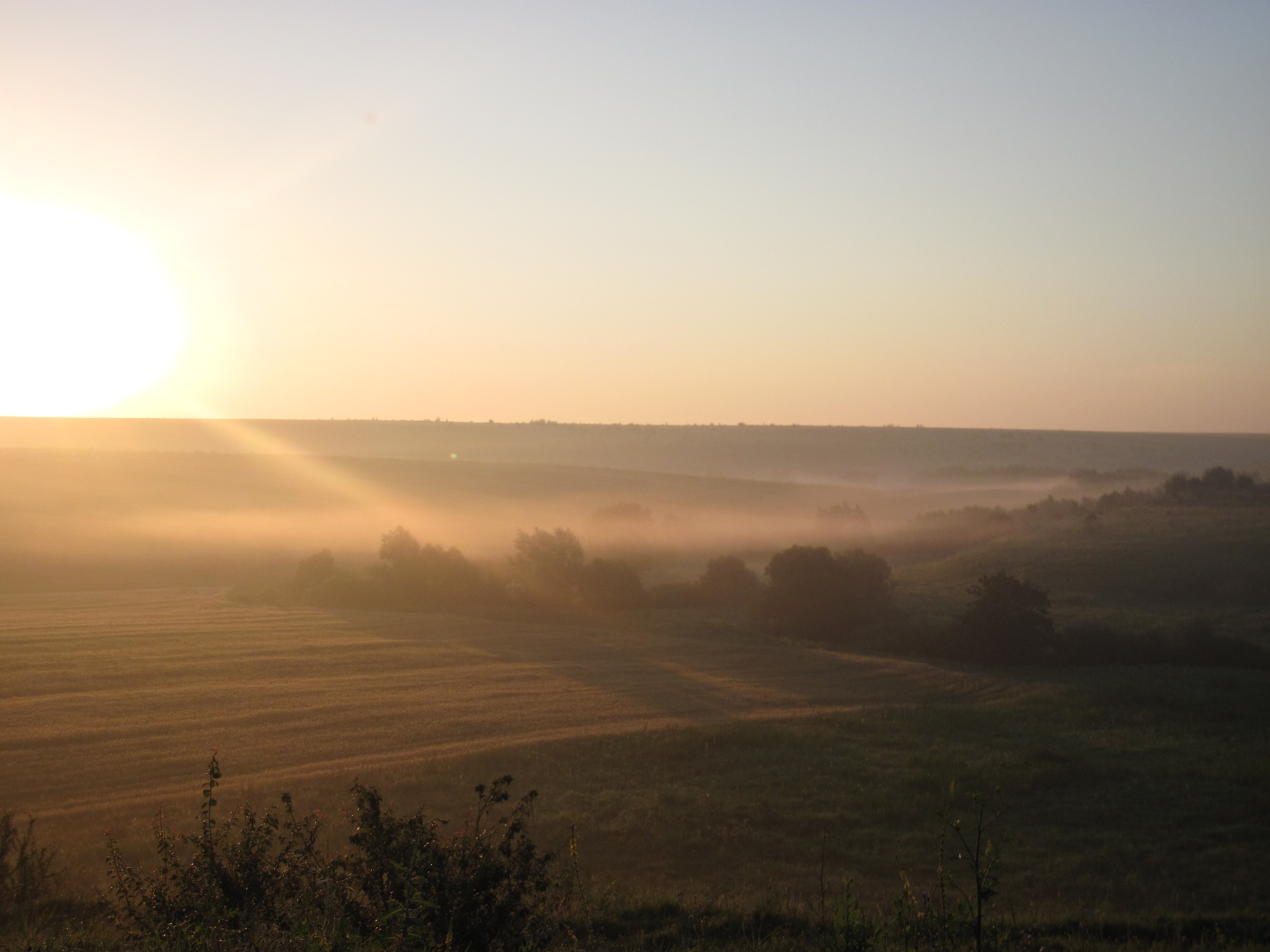

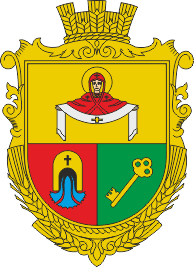
- Flag Coat of arms

- Location in Ternopil Oblast
- Coordinates: 48°56′50″N 25°34′27″E
- Country: Ukraine
- Oblast: Ternopil Oblast
- Raion: Chortkiv Raion
- Hromada: Bilobozhnytsia Hromada
- Time zone: UTC+2 (EET)
  - Summer (DST): UTC+3 (EEST)
- Postal code: 48533

Bazar (Ukrainian: Базар) is a village in Ukraine, Ternopil Oblast, Chortkiv Raion, Bilobozhnytsia rural hromada.

== History ==
The village has been known since the 16th century under the name Mytnytsia; the name Bazar dates back to 1632.

== Religion ==
- Church of the Intercession (UGCC, brick, 1990)

== People ==
- Volodymyr Malanczuk (1904–1990), Ukrainian Greek Catholic hierarch in France
