= Castra Martis =

Roman fortified garrison in Dacia

Coordinates: 43°53′20″N 22°31′20″E

Castra Martis (Bulgarian: Кастра Мартис) was a Roman fortified garrison (castra) in Dacia which became a town and bishopric and remains a Latin Catholic titular see.

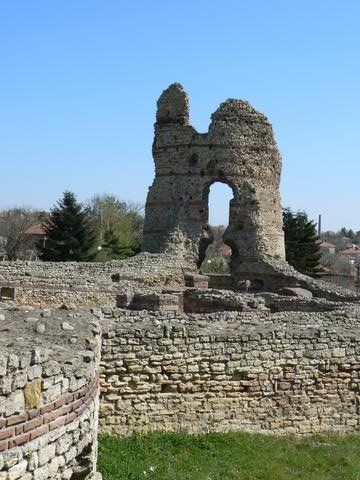
The fortress of Castra Martis

== History ==
Castra Martis, named after the Roman god of war Mars, on the modern site of Kula (Latin/Italian Cula), in Vidin Province in northwestern Bulgaria, served to protect the road through Vrashka Chuka pass in the western Balkan Mountains.

It was important enough in the Roman province of Dacia ripensis to become a suffragan of the provincial capital's Metropolitan Archdiocese of Ratiaria, in the sway of the Patriarchate of Constantinople. Its only recorded Suffragan Bishop was Calvus, participant at the Council of Serdica in 343 (called by the Pope, boycotted by most Eastern sees).

In 408, the Huns under Uldin took control of the site during an attack on the Eastern Roman Empire, apparently by treachery.

== Titular see ==
The diocese was nominally restored in 1933 as Latin Titular bishopric of Castra Martis (Latin) / Castra di Marte (Curiate Italian) / Castromartianus (Latin adjective).

It has had the following incumbents, so far of the fitting Episcopal (lowest) rank :

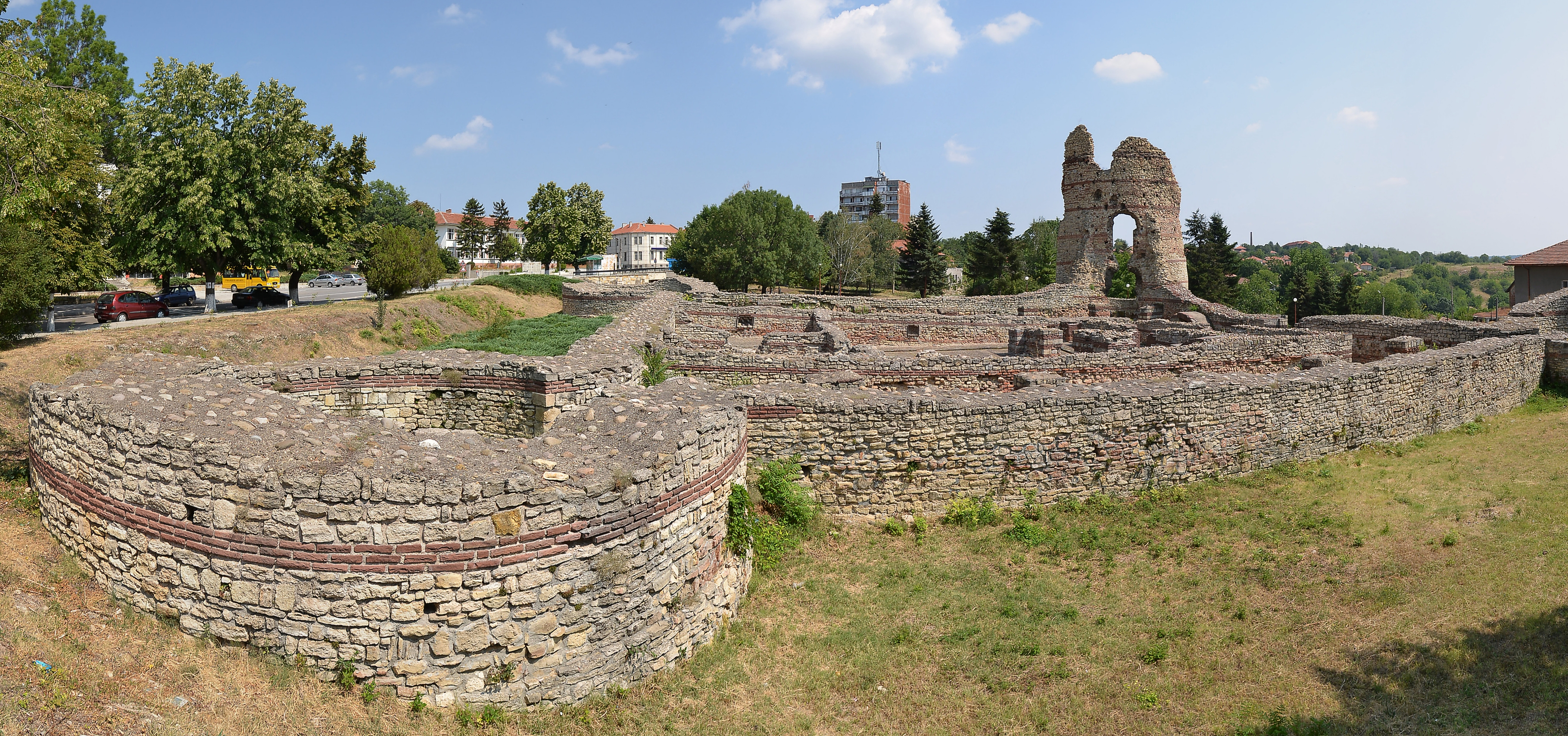
Castra Martis

- Platon Kornyljak (born Ukraine) (1959.04.17 – death 2000.11.01), first as Apostolic Exarch of Germany and Scandinavia of the Ukrainians (Germany etc.) (1959.04.17 – retired 1996.12.16), then on emeritate
- Petro Kryk (born Poland) (2000.11.20 – ...), Apostolic Exarch of Germany and Scandinavia of the Ukrainians (Germany), no previous prelature.

== Eponymy ==
- Castra Martis Hill on Livingston Island, in the South Shetland Islands, West Antarctica, is named after it.

== See also ==
- List of Catholic dioceses in Bulgaria

== Sources and external links ==
- GCatholic - (former and) Latin titular bishopric

Bibliography

- Pius Bonifacius Gams, Series episcoporum Ecclesiae Catholicae, Leipzig 1931, p. 428
- Daniele Farlati-Jacopo Coleti, Illyricum Sacrum, vol. VII, Venice 1817, p. 611
- Jacques Zeiller, Les origines chrétiennes dans les provinces danubiennes de l'empire romain, Paris 1918, p. 155.
