= Niwa, Lubaczów County =

Niwa
- Village
- Location within Poland
- Coordinates: 50°4′51″N 23°1′59″E
- Country: Poland
- Voivodeship: Subcarpathian
- County: Lubaczów
- Gmina: Wielkie Oczy

Niwa [ˈɲiva] is a village in the administrative district of Gmina Wielkie Oczy, within Lubaczów County, Subcarpathian Voivodeship, in south-eastern Poland, close to the border with Ukraine.
