= Potok Jaworowski =

- Village
- Location within Poland
- Coordinates: 50°1′N 23°3′E
- Country: Poland
- Voivodeship: Subcarpathian
- County: Lubaczów
- Gmina: Wielkie Oczy

Potok Jaworowski [ˈpɔtɔk javɔˈrɔfskʲi] is a village in the administrative district of Gmina Wielkie Oczy, within Lubaczów County, Subcarpathian Voivodeship, in south-eastern Poland, close to the border with Ukraine.
