= Mielnik, Podkarpackie Voivodeship =

Mielnik
- Village
- Location within Poland
- Coordinates: 50°1′57″N 23°9′19″E
- Country: Poland
- Voivodeship: Subcarpathian
- County: Lubaczów
- Gmina: Wielkie Oczy

Mielnik [ˈmʲɛlɲik] is a village in the administrative district of Gmina Wielkie Oczy, within Lubaczów County, Subcarpathian Voivodeship, in south-eastern Poland, close to the border with Ukraine.
