= Hirske, Lviv Oblast =

Rural locality in Lviv Oblast, Ukraine

Hirske Гірське
- Location in Lviv Oblast
- Coordinates: 49°28′18″N 23°48′0″E
- Country: Ukraine
- Oblast: Lviv Oblast
- Raion: Stryi Raion
- Hromada: Mykolaiv hromada
- Time zone: UTC+2 (EET)
  - Summer (DST): UTC+3 (EEST)
- Postal code: 81625

Hirske (Ukrainian: Гірське, formerly known as Horutsko) is a village in Mykolaiv urban hromada, Stryi Raion, Lviv Oblast, Ukraine.

== History ==
The first written mention is from 1477.

== Notable residents ==
- Bohdan Dzyurakh (born 1967), curial bishop of the Ukrainian Greek Catholic Church and titular bishop of Vagada
- Ivan Kuziv (1857–1918), Ukrainian Greek Catholic priest and ethnographer
