= Gieregi =

- Settlement
- Location within Poland
- Coordinates: 50°0′54″N 23°8′17″E
- Country: Poland
- Voivodeship: Subcarpathian
- County: Lubaczów
- Gmina: Wielkie Oczy

Gieregi [ɡʲɛˈrɛɡʲi] is a settlement in the administrative district of Gmina Wielkie Oczy, within Lubaczów County, Subcarpathian Voivodeship, in south-eastern Poland, close to the border with Ukraine.
