= Ukrainian Catholic Apostolic Exarchate of Germany and Scandinavia =

Eastern Catholic missionary jurisdiction

Apostolic Exarchate in Germany and Scandinavia for the Ukrainians Exarchatus Apostolicus Germaniae et Scandiae
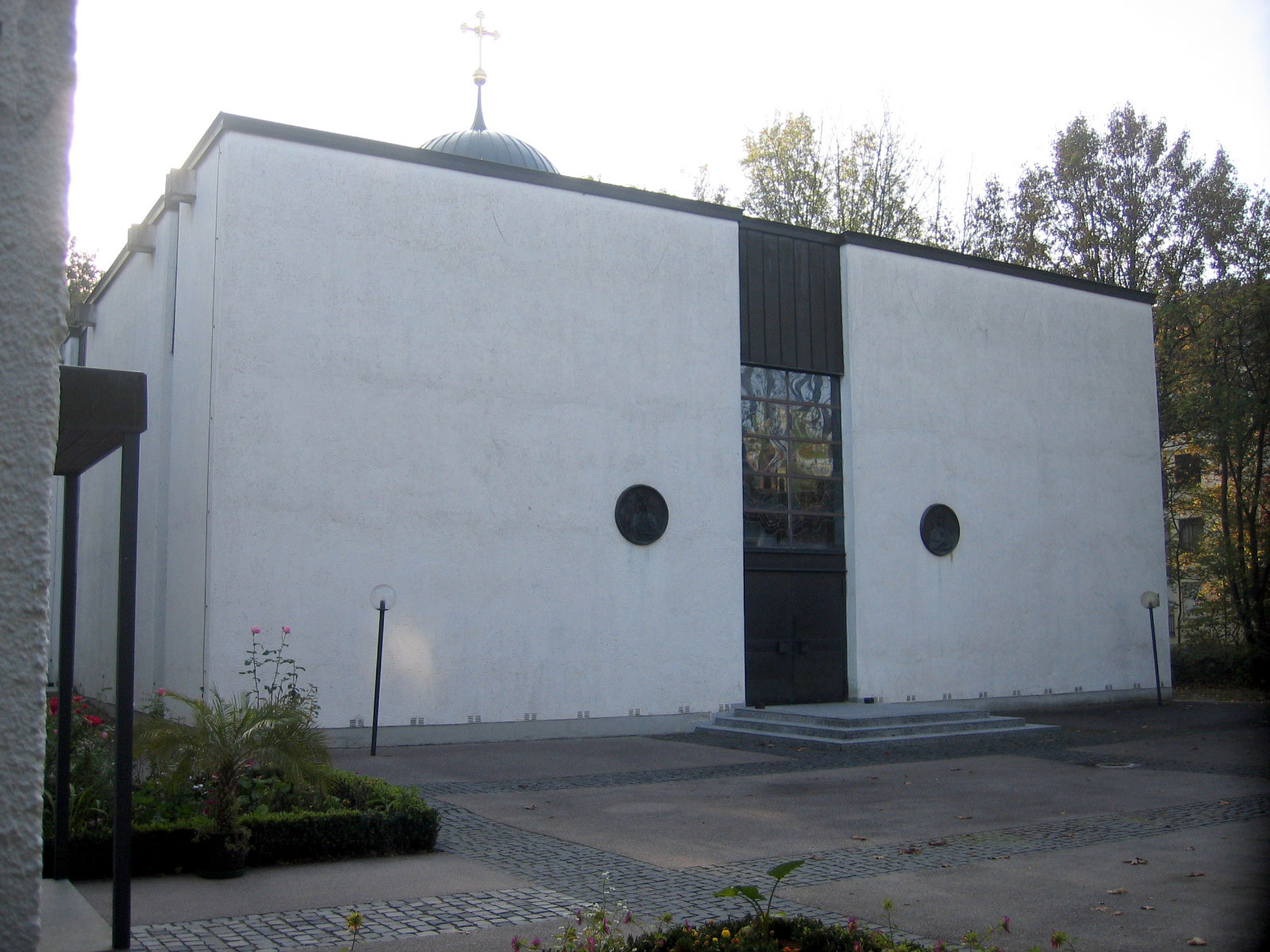
- Cathedral of the Intercession of the Mother of God and of St. Andrew the Firstcalled

Location
- Ecclesiastical province: Apostolic Exarchate of the Ukrainian Greek Catholic Church

Statistics
- Parishes: 19

Information
- Cathedral: Cathedral of the Intercession of the Mother of God and of St. Andrew the Firstcalled
- Secular priests: 34

Current leadership
- Pope: Leo XIV
- Bishop: Rt Revd Bohdan Dzyurakh

The Ukrainian (Greek) Catholic Apostolic Exarchate in Germany and Scandinavia (German: Apostolisches Exarchat für Deutschland und Skandinavien Latin: Exarchatus Apostolicus Germaniae et Scandiae) (Germany and Scandinavia for the Ukrainians) is an Apostolic Exarchate (pre-diocesan jurisdiction) of the Ukrainian Greek Catholic Church that covers the faithful in Germany and the Nordic countries Denmark, Finland, Norway and Sweden.

It is exempt (i.e. directly dependent on the Holy See and its missionary Roman Congregation for the Oriental Churches), so is not part of any ecclesiastical province.

Its cathedral episcopal see is the Kathedrale Maria Schutz und St. Andreas, dedicated to the Intercession of the Theotokos (Mary, Mother of God) and to Saint Andrew, in Munich, Bavaria, Germany. It is headquartered at Schönbergstrasse 9, D-81679 München (Munich), Germany.

The current Apostolic exarch is Bohdan Dzyurakh.

== History ==
It was established on 17 April 1959 as Apostolic Exarchate of Germany and Scandinavia, without a Byzantine rite Catholic precursor.

On 22 April 2023, according to the decree of Bishop Bohdan Dzyurakh, decided that from 1 September 2023, the Ukrainian Catholic Apostolic Exarchate of Germany and Scandinavia will completely switch to the Gregorian calendar, including Easter, unlike the UGCC in Ukraine and Poland.

== Episcopal ordinaries ==
(Byzantine rite, so far missionaries from Eastern Europe)

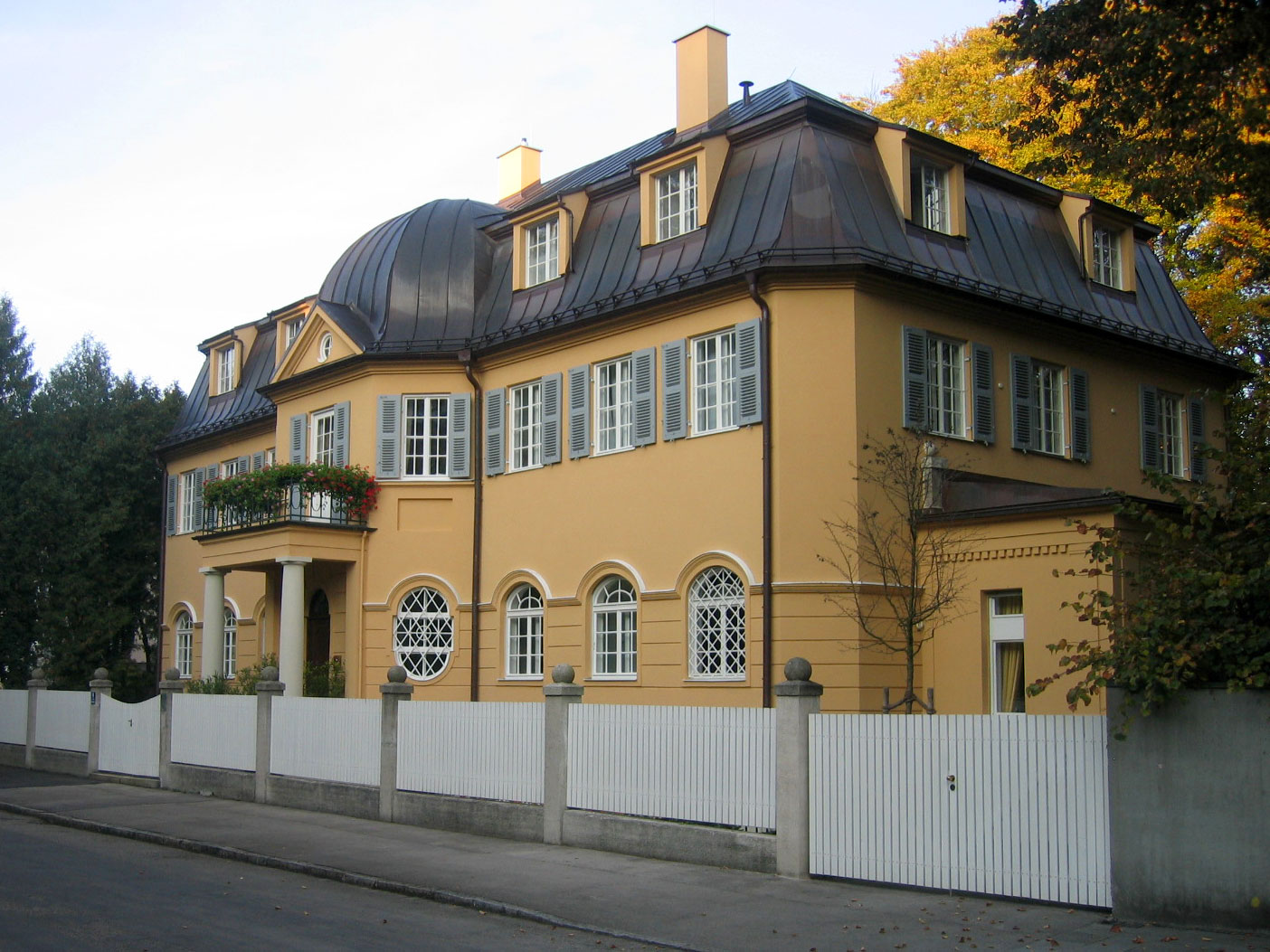
A building, situated in Munich, belonging to the Apostolic Exarchate

Apostolic Exarchs of Germany and Scandinavia

- Platon Kornyljak (7 July 1959 – 16 December 1996) (born Ukraine), Titular Bishop of Castra Martis (1959.04.17 – 2000.11.01); died 2000
- Apostolic Administrator Michel Hrynchyshyn, (16 December 1996 – 3 February 2001)
- Petro Kryk (born Poland) (3 February 2001 – 18 February 2021), Titular Bishop of Castra Martis (2000.11.20 – 2021, 18.2.).
- Bohdan Dzyurakh (18 February 2021 – ...)

== Statistics and extent ==
As per 2014, it pastorally served 40,700 Ukrainian Catholics in 16 parishes with 24 priests (diocesan), 1 deacon, 8 lay religious (brothers) and 1 seminarian.

=== Parishes ===
In many parishes, the Ukrainian Greek Catholics use the local Latin Catholic church as a location for Divine Liturgy.

Denmark

- Sankt Ansgars kirke Cathedral, Copenhagen: 1st Sunday of each month at noon

== See also ==
- List of Catholic dioceses (structured view)
- Ukrainian Greek Catholic Church
- Catholicism in Germany
- Catholicism in Denmark

== Sources and external links ==
- GCatholic.org with Google map and - satellite photo
- Apostolische Exarchie für katholische Ukrainer des byzantinischen Ritus in Deutschland und Skandinavie (in German and Ukrainian)
- Decree of the Ukrainian Catholic Apostolic Exarchate of Germany and Scandinavia on the transition to the Gregorian calendar dated April 22, 2023
