= Borys Gudziak =

American Catholic prelate of the Ukrainian Greek Catholic Church (b. 1960)

Most Reverend Metropolitan-Archbishop Borys Gudziak
- Metropolitan Archbishop of the Ukrainian Catholic Archeparchy of Philadelphia
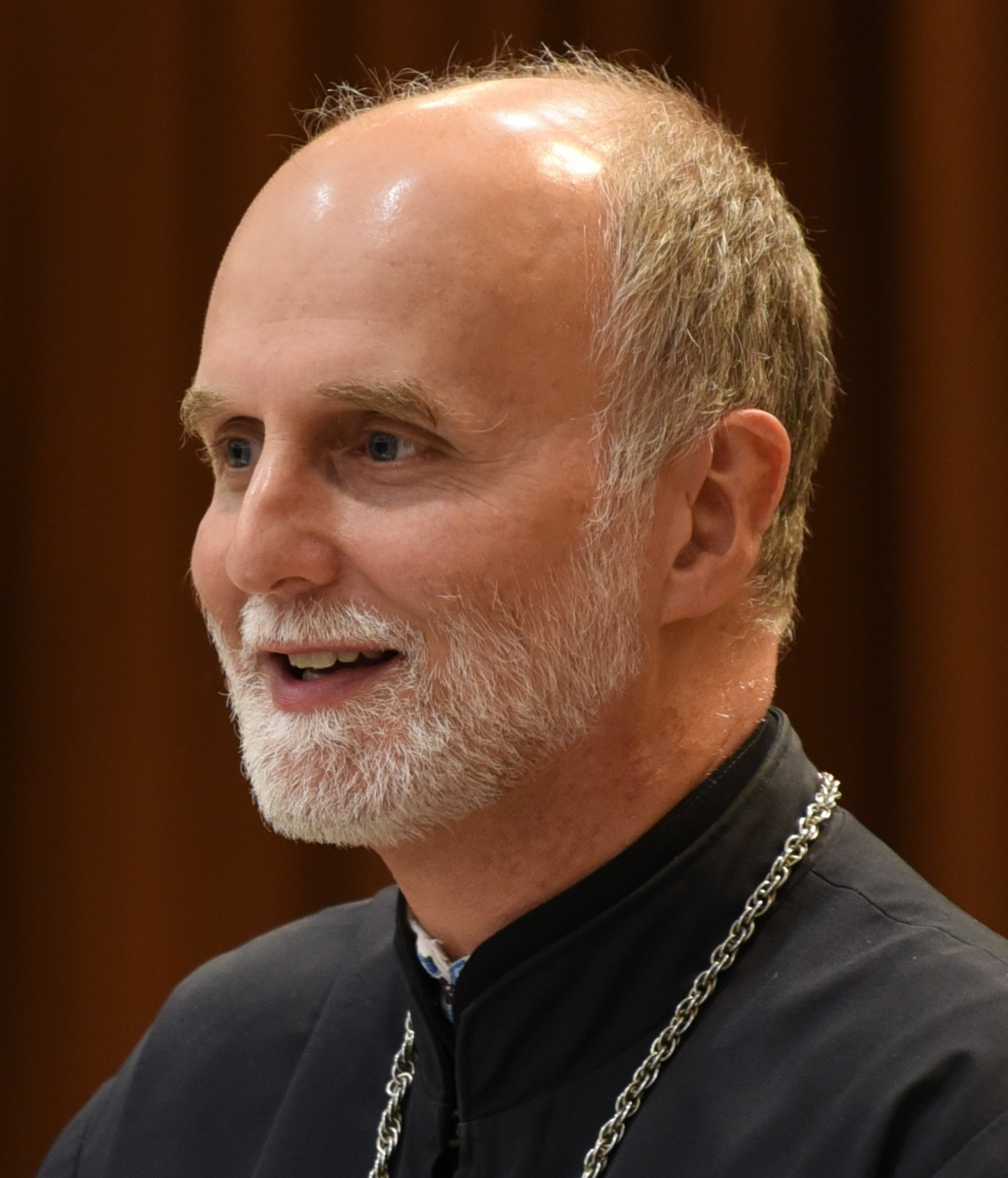
- Church: Catholic Church; Ukrainian Greek Catholic Church
- Archdiocese: Archeparchy of Philadelphia
- Appointed: February 18, 2019
- Installed: June 4, 2019
- Predecessor: Stefan Soroka
- Other posts: Member, Dicastery for Communication (2021‍–‍ ); Head, Department of External Church Relations, UGCC; President, Ukrainian Catholic University; Chairman, USCCB Committee on Domestic Justice and Human Development (2022‍–‍ )
- Previous posts: Bishop of Ukrainian Catholic Eparchy of Saint Vladimir the Great of Paris (2013‍–‍2019); Apostolic Exarch for Ukrainians in France (2012‍–‍2013); Titular Bishop of Carcabia

Orders
- Ordination: 26 November 1998 by Sofron Stefan Mudry
- Consecration: 26 August 2012 by Sviatoslav Shevchuk

Personal details
- Born: Borys Andrij Gudziak; 24 November 1960 (age 65) Syracuse, New York, U.S.
- Education: Syracuse University, philosophy / biology (1980); Pontifical Urban University, theology (1983); Harvard University, Slavic and Byzantine cultural history (1992)
- Motto: Ευχαριστώ (Greek for 'Thank You'; stands for both the Eucharistic sacrifice and gratitude for the grace and generosity of God
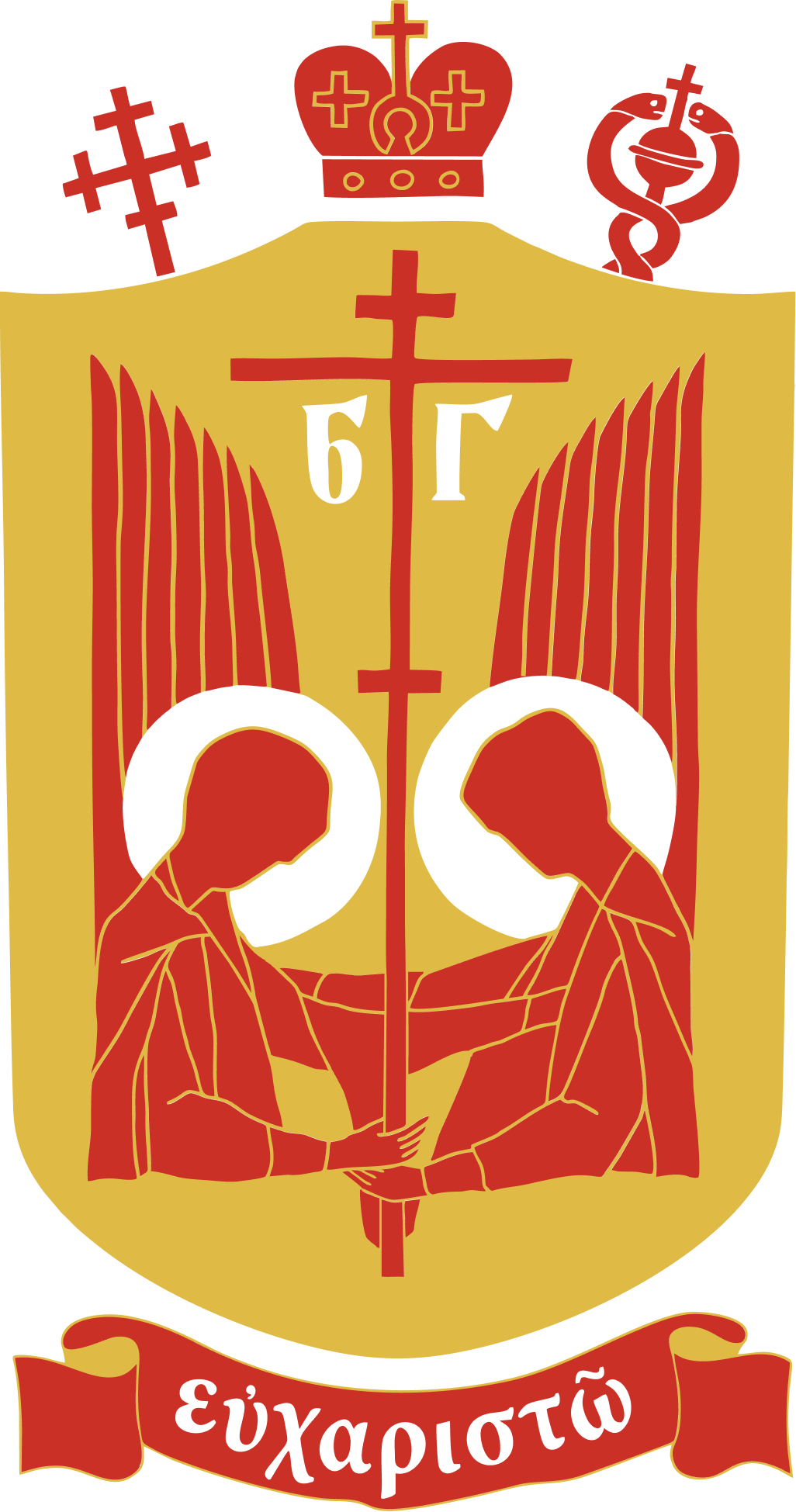
- Coat of arms: Borys Gudziak's coat of arms

Ordination history
History
Diaconal ordination
- Ordained by: Lubomyr Husar
Priestly ordination
- Ordained by: Sofron Mudry
Episcopal consecration
- Principal consecrator: Sviatoslav Shevchuk
- Co-consecrators: Ihor Vozniak, Hlib Lonchyna

Styles of Borys Gudziak
- Reference style: His Grace; The Most Reverend
- Spoken style: His Grace
- Religious style: Metropolitan

Borys Andrij Gudziak (Note: Ukrainian: Борис Ґудзяк, romanized: Borys Gudziak) (born 24 November 1960) is an American prelate of the Catholic Church serving, since 2019, as the Metropolitan-Archbishop of the Ukrainian Catholic Archeparchy of Philadelphia. He founded the Institute of Church History and served as the rector and president of the Ukrainian Catholic University. Gudziak has authored and edited several books on church history, theology, modern church life, and higher education reforms.

== Early life and education ==
Gudziak was born in Syracuse, New York, United States. His parents, both Ukrainian Greek Catholics, were World War II refugees. They came to New York from western Ukraine via Austria and Germany in 1949 and 1950. After completing his pre-university studies at Christian Brothers Academy, he graduated from Syracuse University, obtaining a dual degree in philosophy and biology in 1980. He entered the College of Saint Sophia in Rome where, as a student of the Lviv Archeparchy under Cardinal Josyf Slipyj, he attended the Pontifical Urban University. In 1983 he graduated in theology and began doctoral studies in an interdepartmental program of Slavic and Byzantine Cultural History at Harvard University, where he received his Ph.D. in 1992. His thesis, Crisis and Reform: The Kyivan Metropolitanate, the Patriarchate of Constantinople, and the Genesis of the Union of Brest, was published by the Harvard Ukrainian Research Institute in 1998.

From October 1994 until July 1995 he attended the Pontifical Oriental Institute, examining in particular the synthesis of neopatristic Orthodox theologian Georges Florovsky and receiving licentiate in Eastern Christian Studies.

== Priest ==
In 1992, he moved permanently to Lviv, Ukraine, where he founded the Institute of Church History (ISC), becoming its director until October 2002. In 1993 he was appointed chairman of the Commission for the Renewal of the Lviv Theological Academy by Archbishop Myroslav Ivan Lubachivsky. From 1995 until 2000 he served as vice rector of the Lviv Theological Academy, then as rector from 2000 to 2002. In that year, Gudziak became rector of the Ukrainian Catholic University (founded on the basis of the academy), and since 2013 has served as its president.

He was ordained on 26 November 1998 in the Cathedral of St. George in Lviv by Bishop Sofron (Mudry) and incardinated in the Major Archeparchy of Lviv of the Ukrainians. He is the author of over 50 studies on the history of the Church, theological training and on different topics of cultural relevance.

== Bishop ==
On 21 July 2012 it was announced that Pope Benedict XVI accepted the resignation of Michel Hrynchyshyn from the pastoral Apostolic Exarchate for Ukrainians of the Byzantine rite in France, and appointed Gudziak apostolic exarch for the Ukrainian faithful of the Byzantine rite in France, at the same time appointing him Titular Bishop of Carcabia. He was ordained a bishop on 26 August 2012 and installed in a Divine Liturgy on 2 December 2012.

On January 19, 2013, Benedict XVI elevated the Apostolic Exarchate of France, Benelux and Switzerland for the Ukrainians to the status of a full apostolic eparchy (the equivalent of a diocese), and named it after Saint Vladimir. Gudziak, though already an ordained bishop, is now an ordinary bishop (or head, of a fully established Eastern diocese), instead of an exarch. He ceased to be a titular bishop since he is now an ordinary bishop.

At the time Gudziak was the 49th member of the Synod of Bishops of the Ukrainian Greek Catholic Church. Besides France, the eparchy also serves Belgium, the Netherlands, Luxembourg, and Switzerland.

In May 2018, Gudziak received an honorary doctorate of humane letters degree during the 164th commencement of Syracuse University.

On February 18, 2019, Pope Francis appointed Gudziak Ukrainian Catholic Archbishop of Philadelphia and Metropolitan for the Ukrainian Catholic Church in USA and thus concurring with the recommendation of the appointment offered by the Synod of Ukrainian Catholic Bishops, which met in September 2018 in Lviv, Ukraine. He was installed on June 4, 2019. On June 4, 2019, Metropolitan Archbishop Gudziak was enthroned as the head of the Ukrainian Catholic Archeparchy of Philadelphia at the Ukrainian Catholic Cathedral of the Immaculate Conception in Philadelphia, PA.

Pope Francis named him a member of the Congregation for the Oriental Churches on August 6, 2019. In 2021 Pope Francis appointed Gudziak a member of the Dicastery for Communication.

In May 2022, he was the commencement speaker at the University of Notre Dame's 177th commencement ceremony. In 2021, Archbishop Gudziak was the commencement speaker during Saint Charles Borromeo Seminary's 2021 Concursus

== Scholarly, editorial, teaching and administrative activities ==
Author and editor of books and articles on church-historical, spiritual, and theological topics in different languages, as well as texts on modern church life, development and reform of higher education, spirituality of architecture, and other issues of public, social, cultural and political life. His most important publication is "The Kyivan Metropolitanate, the Patriarchate of Constantinople, and the Genesis of the Union of Brest"

Co-founder and co-editor of the church history journal "The Ark" (1993). Member of the editorial board of the journal «Logos: A Journal of Eastern Christian Studies» Ottawa, Canada (1994). Member of the Scientific Council of the journal «Oecumanica Civitas Rivista del Centro di documentazione del Movimento Ecumenico Italiano" in Livorno, Italia (2001). Scientific editor of the translation of John Paul II's book "Memory and Identity" (2005).

== Awards ==
- Order of Merit 3rd Class of Ukraine (November 7, 2005)
- Antonovych prize (2006)
- Chevalier (Knight) of the National Order of the Legion of Honour of France (2015)
- Order of Merit 2nd Class of Ukraine (November 7, 2016)
- Notre Dame Award presented by the University of Notre Dame (June 2019)
- Cross of Ivan Mazepa (September 4, 2023)
- Order of Merit 1st Class of Ukraine (August 23, 2025)

== See also ==
- Catholic Church hierarchy
- Catholic Church in the United States
- Historical list of the Catholic bishops of the United States
- List of Catholic bishops of the United States
- Lists of patriarchs, archbishops, and bishops

== Episcopal succession ==
Catholic Church titles
Preceded by Stefan Soroka	Archeparch of Philadelphia; 4 June 2019–present	Incumbent
Preceded by Michel Hrynchyshyn, C.S.S.R.	Eparch of Saint Vladimir the Great of Paris; 21 July 2012–4 June 2019	Succeeded by Ihor Rantsya
