= Dumy, Poland =

Dumy
- Village
- Location within Poland
- Coordinates: 50°00′30″N 23°06′18″E
- Country: Poland
- Voivodeship: Podkarpackie
- County: Lubaczów
- Gmina: Wielkie Oczy

Dumy [ˈdumɨ] is a village in the administrative district of Gmina Wielkie Oczy, within Lubaczów County, Podkarpackie Voivodeship, in south-eastern Poland, close to the border with Ukraine.
