= Wielkie Oczy =

- Village
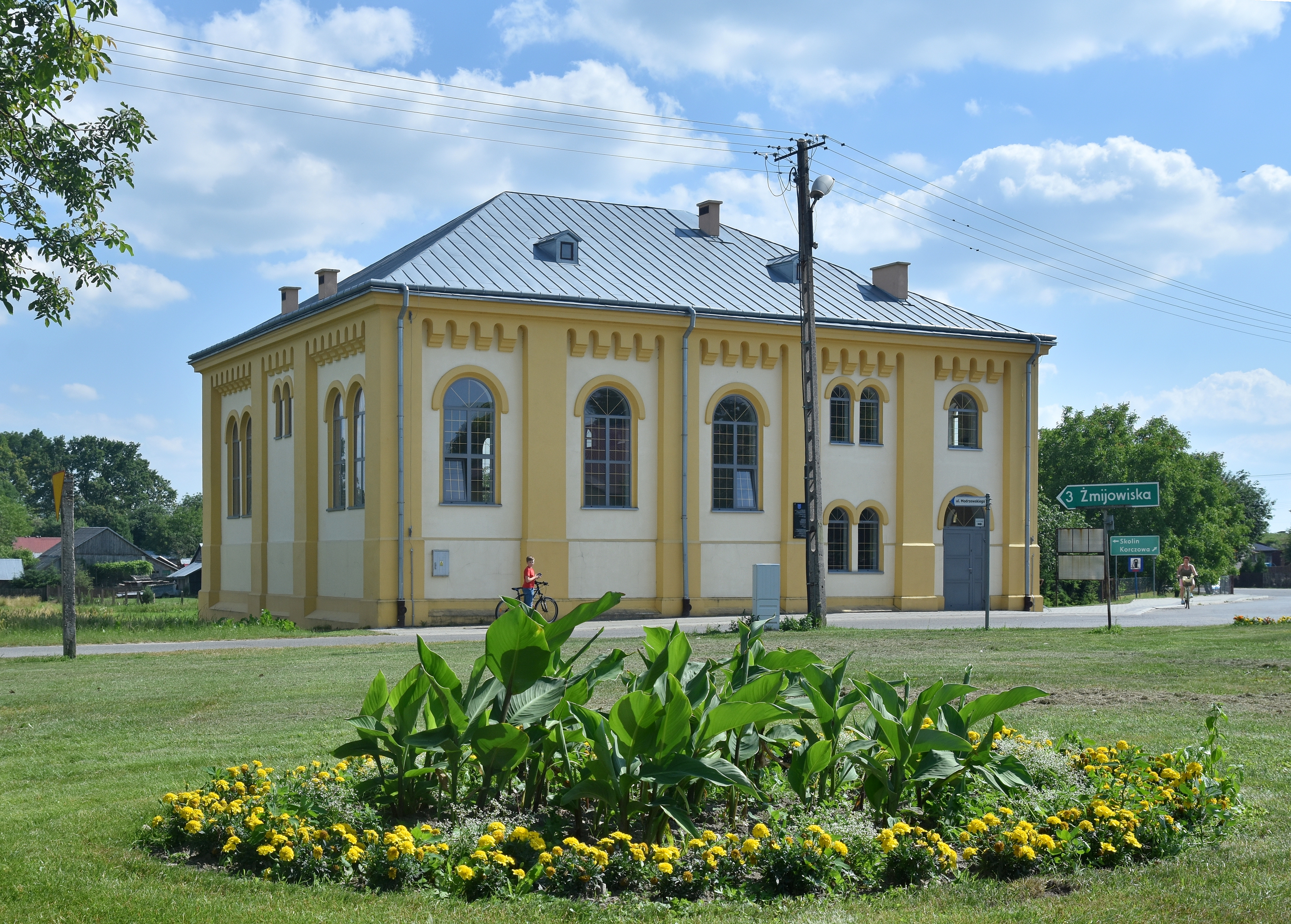
- Former Synagogue

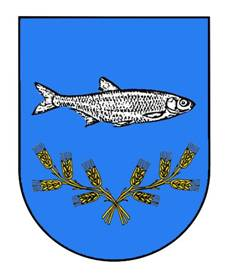
- Coat of arms

- Location within Poland
- Coordinates: 50°1′22″N 23°9′44″E
- Country: Poland
- Voivodeship: Subcarpathian
- County: Lubaczów
- Gmina: Wielkie Oczy

Population
  - Total: 880

Wielkie Oczy [ˈvʲɛlkʲɛ ˈɔt͡ʂɨ] is a village (town until 1935) in Lubaczów County, Subcarpathian Voivodeship, in south-eastern Poland, close to the border with Ukraine. It is the seat of the gmina (administrative district) called Gmina Wielkie Oczy.

== History ==
In 1656 the village was given by wife of hetman Stanisław Rewera Potocki to soldier Andrzej Modrzejowski (later colonel, starosta and podskarbi nadworny koronny) for saving hetman's life. So that Modrzejowski became almost neighbour and friend of Jan Sobieski (later king of Poland) who lived in Ukrainian Yavoriv at that time.

In 1880, there were 996 Jews in the town (50,4% of the whole population). In 1921, there were 487 Jews living in Wielkie Oczy. This decrease in the population was caused by World War I as well as by the cholera epidemic in 1915. On the June 10, 1941, 168 Jews from Wielkie Oczy were displaced to the Krakowiec ghetto and 274 to the Yavoriv ghetto. The old synagogue was dismantled and the Jewish cemetery was devastated. In December 1942, the Jews from the Krakowiec ghetto were taken to the Yavoriv ghetto and on April 16, 1943, they were killed by Nazis. At least 41 Jews were shot at the Jewish cemetery in Wielkie Oczy by the German and Ukrainian Police over the course of several executions that took place mainly in 1943 and 1944.
