= Ukrainian Catholic Eparchy of Saint Volodymyr the Great of Paris =

Ukrainian Greek Catholic eparchy in Western Europe

Coordinates: 48°51′17″N 2°19′51″E

Eparchy of Saint Volodymyr the Great Paris Eparchia Sancti Vladimiri Magni in urbe Parisiensi pro Ucrainis ritus Byzantini Diocèse de Saint-Volodymyr-le-Grand de Paris Єпархія Святого Володимира Великого у Парижі
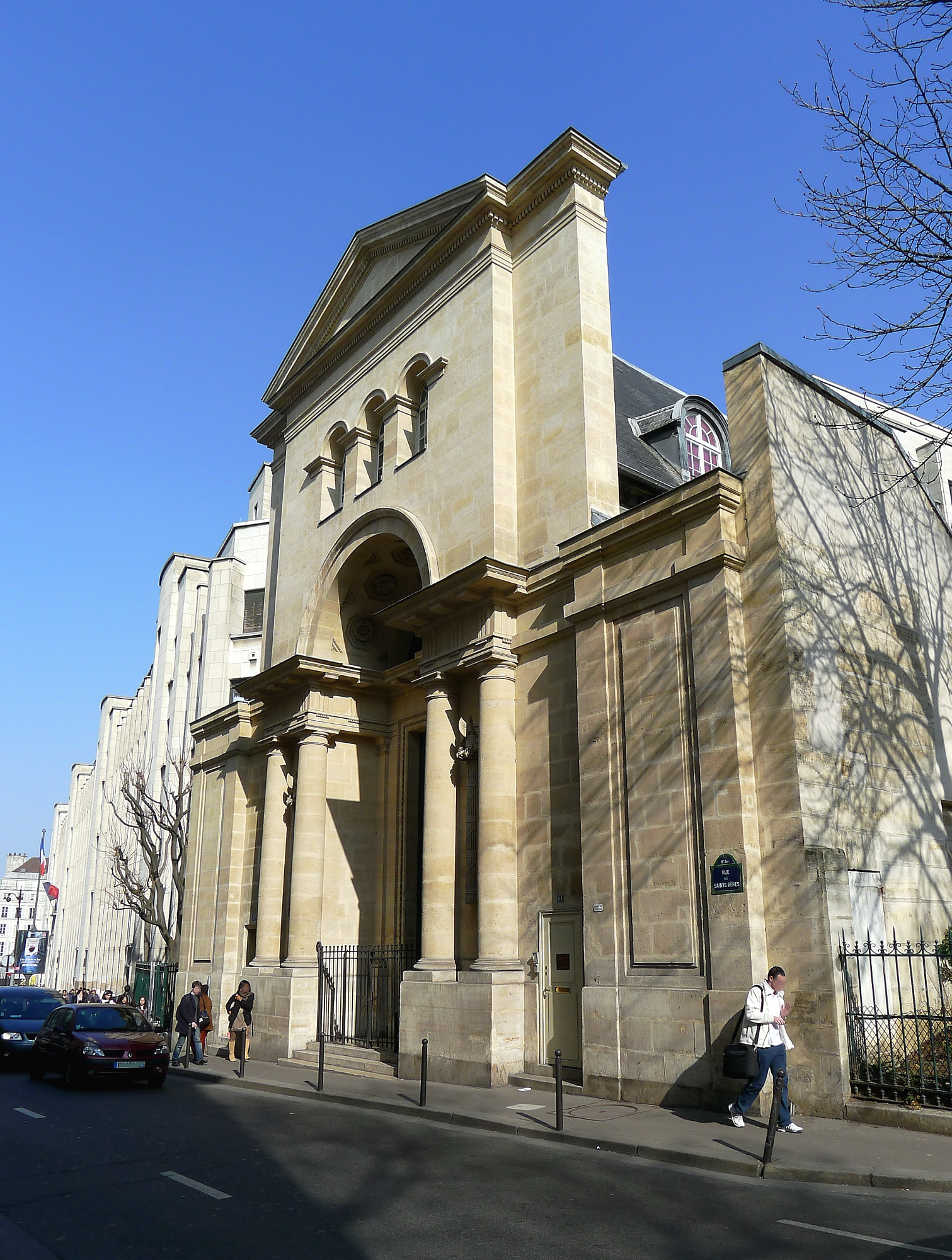
- Cathedral of St. Volodymyr

Location
- Country: France
- Territory: France, Belgium, Luxemburg, the Netherlands and Switzerland
- Ecclesiastical province: Not part of any ecclesiastical province
- Metropolitan: Major Archeparch of Kyiv–Galicia

Statistics
- Population: (as of 2022); 26,000
- Parishes: 16

Information
- Denomination: Catholic Church
- Sui iuris church: Ukrainian Greek Catholic Church
- Rite: Byzantine Rite
- Established: 22 July 1960
- Cathedral: Cathedral of St. Volodymyr in Paris
- Patron saint: Volodymyr the Great
- Secular priests: 25 (Diocesan); 2 (Religious Orders)

Current leadership
- Pope: Leo XIV
- Major Archbishop: Sviatoslav Shevchuk
- Bishop: Ihor Rantsya

The Eparchy of Saint Volodymyr the Great of Paris (French: Éparchie Saint Volodymyr-le-Grand de Paris des Ukrainiens; Ukrainian: Єпархія Святого Володимира Великого у Парижі) is an eparchy of the Ukrainian Greek Catholic Church, a sui iuris Eastern Catholic Church in full communion with the Catholic Church. Its territory encompasses France, Belgium, Luxemburg, the Netherlands and Switzerland.

Its cathedral is the Cathédrale Saint-Volodymyr-le-Grand in the episcopal see of Paris.

The former eparch Borys Gudziak was appointed as Archeparch of Ukrainian Catholic Archeparchy of Philadelphia on 4 February 2019, while Hlib Lonchyna, Eparch of Ukrainian Catholic Eparchy of the Holy Family of London was appointed as apostolic administrator.

== History ==
The eparchy was erected on 22 July 1960 as apostolic exarchate for the French, Benelux and Swiss faithful of the Ukrainian Greek Catholic Church.

On 19 January 2013 the exarchate was elevated in the rank of the eparchy by Pope Benedict XVI. It remains immediately subject to the Major Archbishop of Kyiv–Halyč, without belonging to his metropolitan province.

== List of former Hierarchs ==
Apostolic Exarchs for Ukrainians in France
From	Until	Incumbent	Notes
1960	1982	Volodymyr Malanczuk, C.Ss.R.	Titular Bishop of Epiphania in Syria (1960–1990)
1982	2012	Michael Hrynchyshyn, C.Ss.R.	Titular Bishop of Zygris (1982–2012) and Apostolic Administrator of the Apostolic Exarchate for Ukrainians in Great Britain (1987–1989)
2012	2013	Borys Gudziak	Titular Bishop of Carcabia (2012–2013). Became the first eparchial Bishop of the Eparchy of Saint Wladimir-Le-Grand de Paris.

Eparchial bishops of the Eparchy of Saint Wladimir-Le-Grand de Paris
From	Until	Incumbent	Notes
2013	2019	Borys Gudziak	Served previously as Apostolic Exarch for Ukrainians in France
2025		Ihor Rantsya	

== See also ==
- Catholic Church
- Ukrainian Greek Catholic Church
- Ukrainian Catholic Eparchy of Holy Family of London

== Sources and external links ==
- Official website of the Eparchy
- GCatholic.org information
