= Parishes of the Ukrainian Catholic Eparchy of the Holy Family of London =

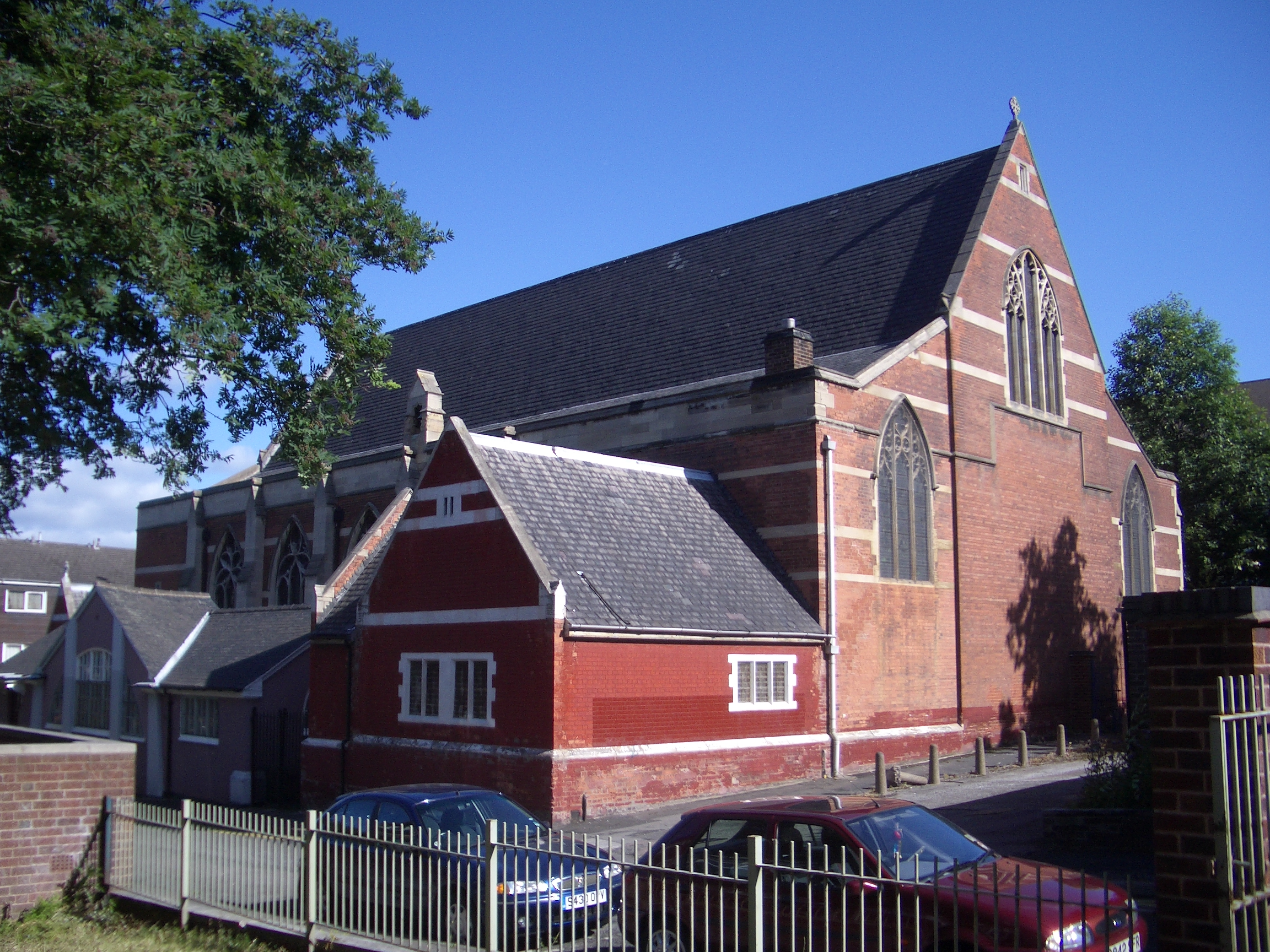
Our Lady of Perpetual Succour and Saint Alban Ukrainian Catholic Church, Bond Street, Sneinton, Notts.

This is a list of parish churches of the Ukrainian Catholic Eparchy of the Holy Family of London.

Note: many Ukrainian Catholic local communities share buildings with Latin Rite faithful.

§ indicates a permanently resident Ukrainian Catholic cleric.

== England ==
=== South ===
- London: Ukrainian Catholic Cathedral of the Holy Family in Exile, Mayfair §
- Bedford: St Josaphat Ukrainian Greek Catholic Church, 52 York Street (served from Peterborough)
- Bristol: St Mary on the Quay, Colston Avenue (served from Gloucester)
- Gloucester: Good Shepherd Ukrainian Catholic Church, Derby Road §

=== The Midlands ===
- Birmingham: St Catherine of Siena Church, Bristol Street (served from Wolverhampton)
- Coventry: St Vladimir the Great, Broad Street §
- Derby: St Michael's Ukrainian Catholic Church, Dairyhouse Road
- Leicester: Ascension of Our Lord Ukrainian Catholic Church
- Nottingham: Our Lady of Perpetual Succour and Saint Alban Ukrainian Catholic Church, Bond Street, Sneinton §
- Peterborough: St Olga Ukrainian Catholic Church, New Road, Woodston
- Wolverhampton: Saints Vladimir and Olga Ukrainian Catholic Church, Merridale Street West §

=== The North ===
- Ashton-under-Lyne: St Paul's Church, Ashton-under-Lyne, Stockton Road (served from Oldham, Greater Manchester)
- Rochdale: St Mary and St James Ukrainian Catholic Church, Wardleworth, 328 Yorkshire Street §
- Bolton: All Saints Ukrainian Catholic Church, All Saints Street §
- Blackburn: Saint Alban's Church, Lingard Terrace (served from Bolton)
- Bradford: The Holy Trinity And Our Lady Of Pochayev Ukrainian Catholic Church, Wilmer Road, Bradford § (served by the Basilian Fathers, with resident Sisters Servants of Mary Immaculate)
- Dewsbury: Our Lady and Saint Paulinus, Huddersfield Road (served from Bradford)
- Manchester: St Mary's Ukrainian Catholic Church, Cheetham Hill Road
- Manchester: Our Lady of the Assumption, Bury Old Road, Salford §
- Oldham: SS Peter and Paul and All Saints Ukrainian Catholic Church § (Very Revd Bohdan-Benjamin Lysykanych, D Litt, Ph D, Syncellus

== Wales ==
- Cardiff: Parish of St Theodore of Tarsus at St Cuthbert's, Pomeroy Street
- Swansea: Parish of St Theodore of Tarsus at St Peter's, Morriston

== Scotland ==
- Leith: St Andrew's Ukrainian Catholic Church, Dalmeny Street

== See also ==
- Ukrainian Greek Catholic Church
- National parish
