= Ukrainian Catholic Apostolic Exarchate of Italy =

Eastern Catholic missionary jurisdiction in Italy

Apostolic Exarchate of Italy Exarchatus Apostolicus Italiae
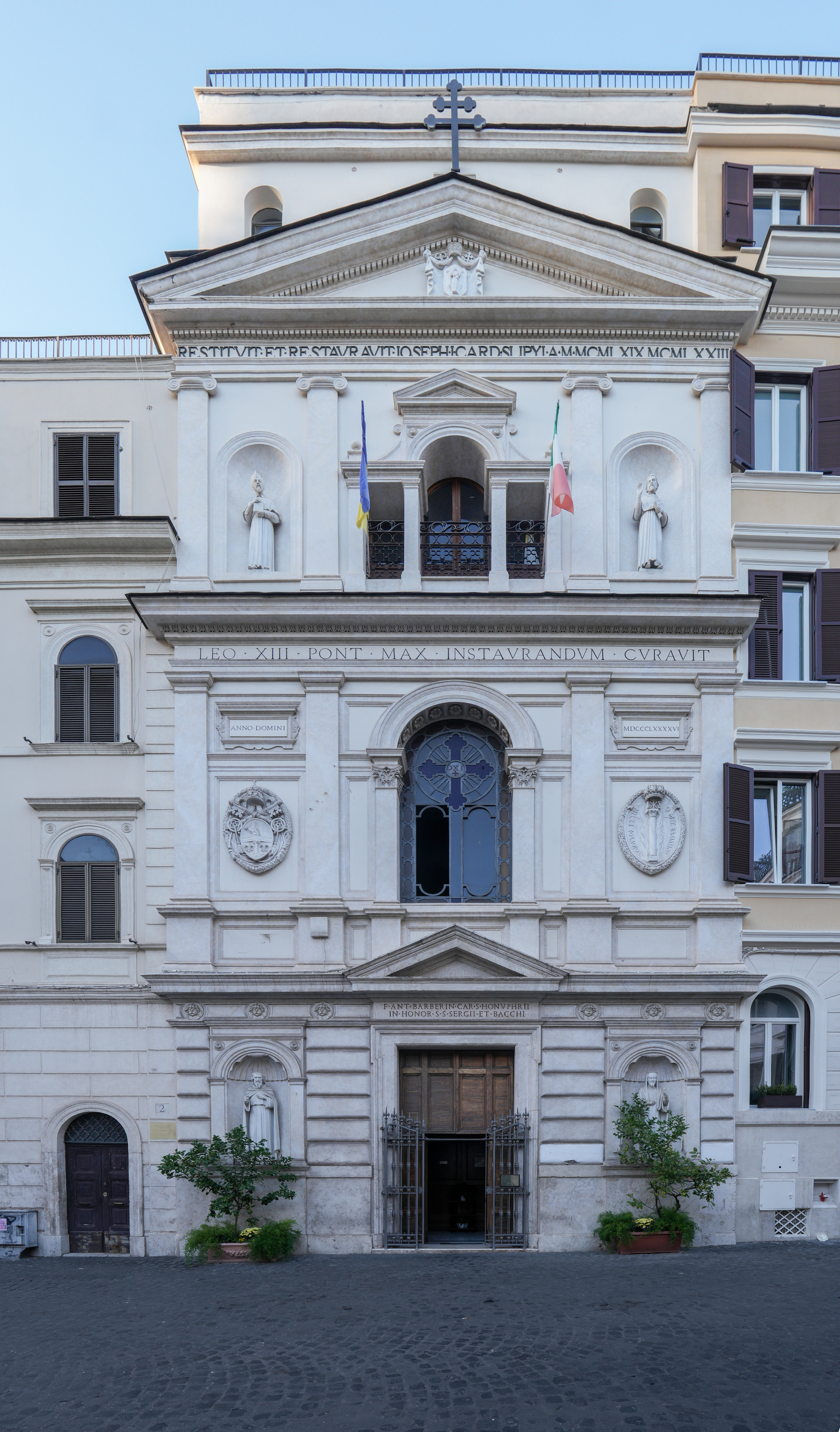
- Sts. Sergius and Bacchus Cathedral

- Coat of arms of the Apostolic Exarchate

Location
- Country: Italy, San Marino
- Headquarters: Rome, Italy

Statistics
- Area: 301,340 km^{2} (116,350 sq mi)
- Population: 70,000
- Parishes: 174

Information
- Sui iuris church: Ukrainian Greek Catholic
- Rite: Byzantine
- Established: 11 July 2019
- Cathedral: Sts. Sergius & Bacchus Cathedral, Rome
- Secular priests: 82
- Language: Ukrainian; Church Slavonic

Current leadership
- Pope: Leo XIV
- Major Archbishop: Sviatoslav Shevchuk
- Apostolic Exarch: Vacant
- Apostolic Administrator: Hryhoriy Komar
- Bishops emeritus: Dionisio Lachovicz, O.S.B.M.

Map
- The Apostolic Exarchate in dark green

Website
- Official Website

The Ukrainian Catholic Apostolic Exarchate of Italy (Latin: Exarchatus Apostolicus Italiae Ucrainorum) is an Apostolic Exarchate (pre-diocesan jurisdiction) of the Ukrainian Greek Catholic Church covers its faithful in Italy and San Marino.

== History ==
=== Early history ===
At the end of the 20th century, Greek Catholics had only three churches in Italy. They all were in Rome. However, with the onset of emigration from Ukraine to Italy, thousands of people arrived for which mission stations were established. On 16 October 2001, by agreement between Head of the Ukrainian Greek Catholic Church and the Episcopal Conference of Italy was appointed pastoral coordinator, Rev. Vasyl Potochnyak, with a task to coordinate these missionary stations. Also on 14 January 2003 was appointed Apostolic visitor, bishop Hlib Lonchyna, who was deputed to investigate circumstance of the Ukrainian faithful in country, and to submit a report to the Holy See and to the Synod of Bishops of the Ukrainian Greek Catholic Church. He was replaced by bishop Dionisio Lachovicz in 2009.

=== Establishment ===
It was established on 11 July 2019 by Pope Francis for the 145 Ukrainian Greek Catholic parishes. The circumscription encompasses the entire Italian territory. The Church of Santi Sergio e Bacco, that is located on Piazza Madonna dei Monti in the rione of Monti in Rome, become the cathedral.

On 31 May 2021, the Ukrainian Catholic Apostolic Exarchate of Italy decided to switch to the Gregorian calendar from 1 September 2021.

As for November 2022 the Apostolic Exarchate has 170 parishes, and as for May 2024 there are 174 parishes, 80 priests (38 of them are married) and 5 seminarians.

== Hierarches ==
=== Apostolic visitors ===
- Hlib Lonchyna, M.S.U. (14 January 2003 – 7 January 2009), Titular Bishop of Bareta
- Dionisio Lachovicz, O.S.B.M. (19 January 2009 – 11 July 2019), Titular Bishop of Egnatia

=== Apostolic exarches ===
- Cardinal Angelo De Donatis (11 July 2019 – 24 October 2020), Apostolic Administrator sede vacante
  - Dionisio Lachovicz, O.S.B.M. (5 September 2019 – 24 October 2020), Delegate with the rights of Apostolic Exarch
- Dionisio Lachovicz, O.S.B.M. (24 October 2020 – 7 March 2025)
- Hryhoriy Komar (since 7 March 2025), Apostolic Administrator sede vacante

== Churches ==
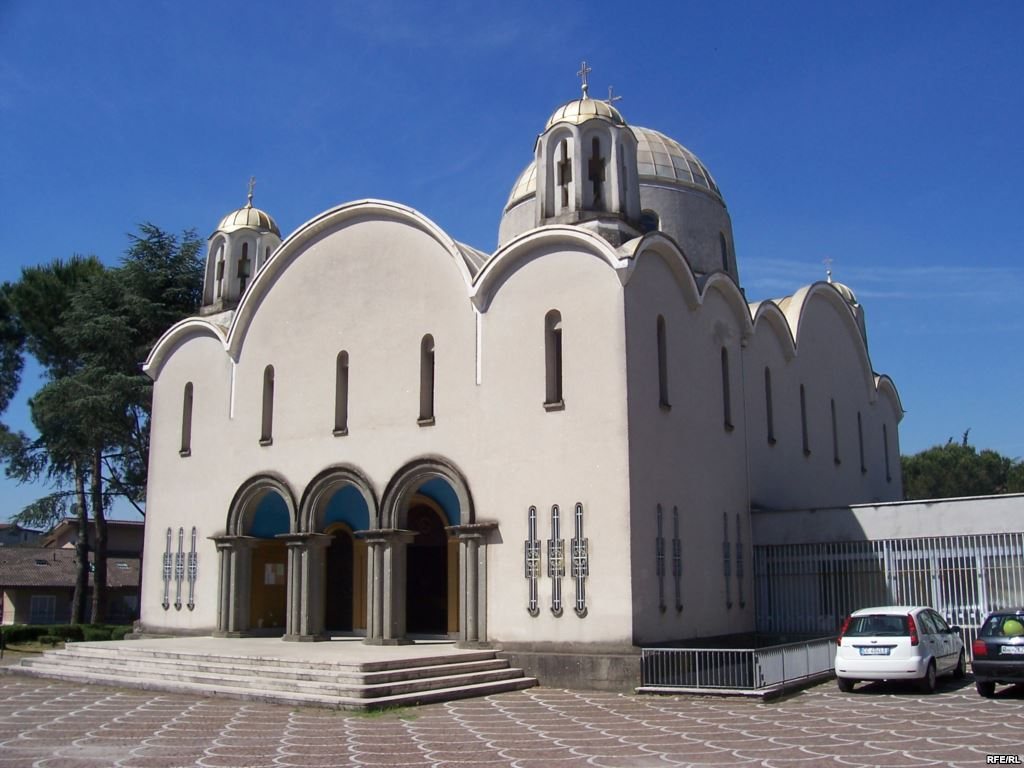
Santa Sofia a Via Boccea Basilica, Rome

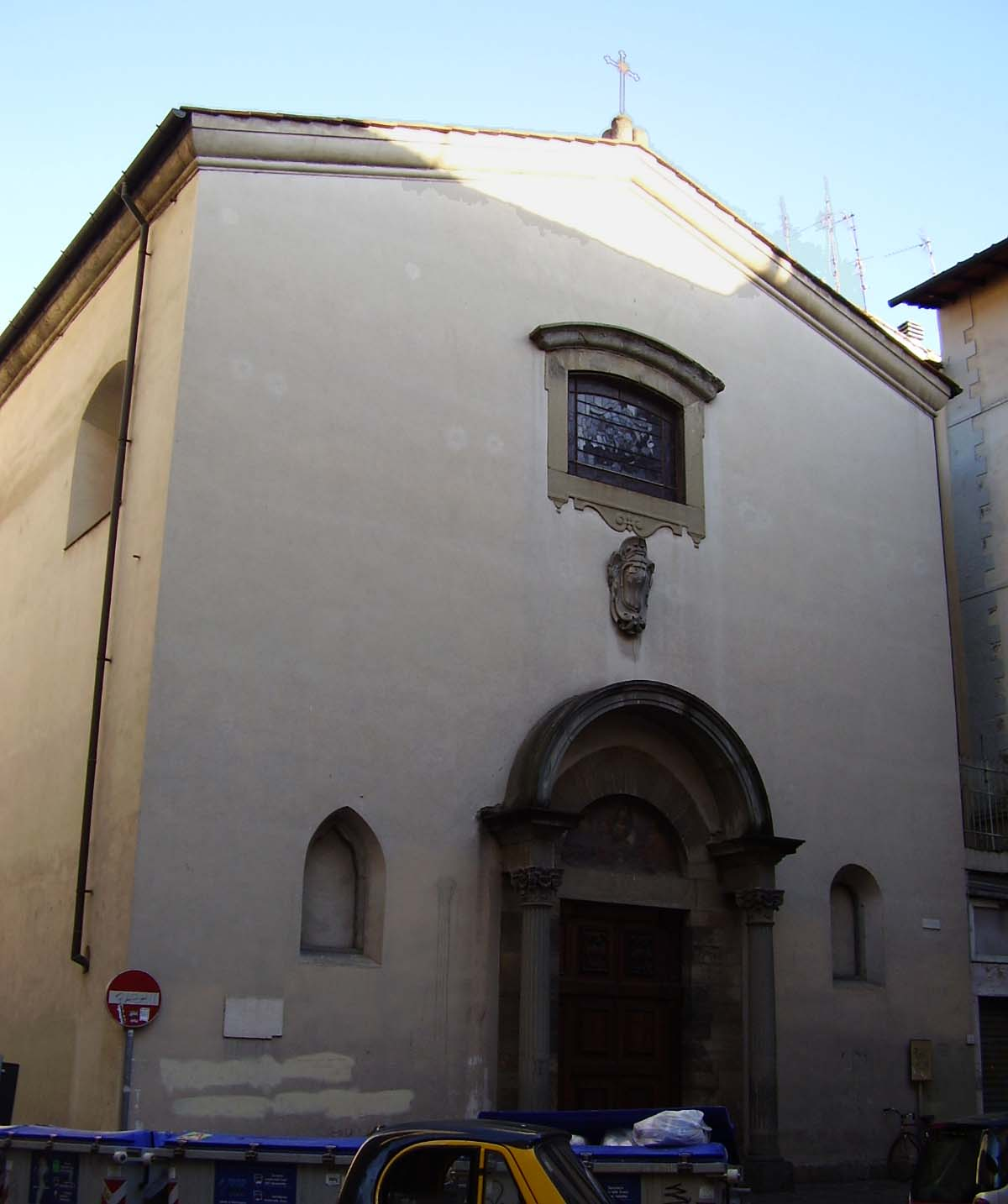
Santi Simone e Giuda Church, Florence
