= Dionisio Lachovicz =

Ukrainian Greek Catholic bishop

Dionisio Lachovicz, O.S.B.M.
- Titular Bishop of Egnatia
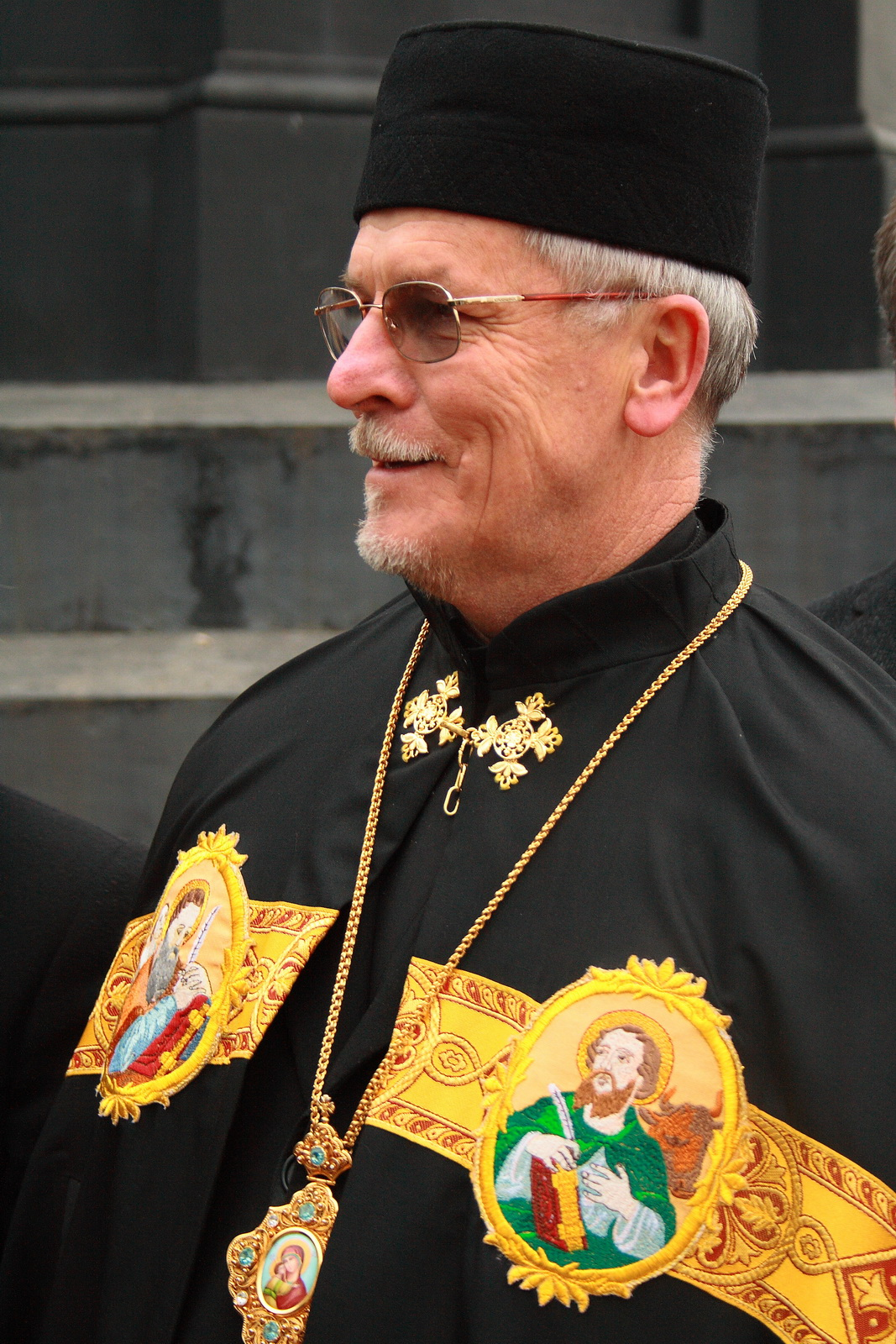
- Bishop Lachovicz in 2007
- Church: Ukrainian Greek Catholic Church
- Appointed: 19 January 2009
- Term ended: 11 July 2019
- Predecessor: Hlib Lonchyna
- Successor: post abolished
- Other posts: Curial Bishop of Kyiv-Halych (2005–2009); Titular Bishop of Egnatia (since 2005); Protoarchimandrite of O.S.B.M. (1996–2004)

Orders
- Ordination: 8 Dec 1972 (Priest) by Efraím Basílio Krevey
- Consecration: 26 Feb 2006 (Bishop) by Lubomyr Husar

Personal details
- Born: Paulo Lachovicz; 2 July 1946 (age 79) Pombas, Santa Catarina, Brazil
- Coat of arms

Bishop Dionisio Paulo Lachovicz, O.S.B.M. (Ukrainian: Діонісій Павло Ляхович; born 2 July 1946) is a Brazilian-born Ukrainian Greek Catholic hierarch. He was an Apostolic Visitor for the Ukrainian Greek Catholics in Italy (until 2019) and Spain (until 2016). Prior to this appointment, he served as a Curial Bishop of the Major Archeparchy of Kyiv-Halych from 21 December 2005, until 19 January 2009, under the title of Titular Bishop of Egnatia. From 5 September 2019, he was a Delegate with the rights of Apostolic Exarch for the Ukrainian Catholic Apostolic Exarchate of Italy, and later become a full Apostolic Exarch, until his retirement on 7 March 2025.

== Biography ==
Bishop Lachovicz was born in a family of ethnic Ukrainian Greek-Catholics in Pombas, Itaiópolis, Santa Catarina, Brazil. After attending the Basilian minor seminary, he joined the Order of Saint Basil the Great and made his first profession on January 30, 1964, followed by his solemn profession on March 30, 1970. He was ordained as a priest on December 8, 1972, after studies at St. Basil's Seminary-Studium in Curitiba. Then he continued his studies in Brazil and Italy, earning a licentiate in Theology.

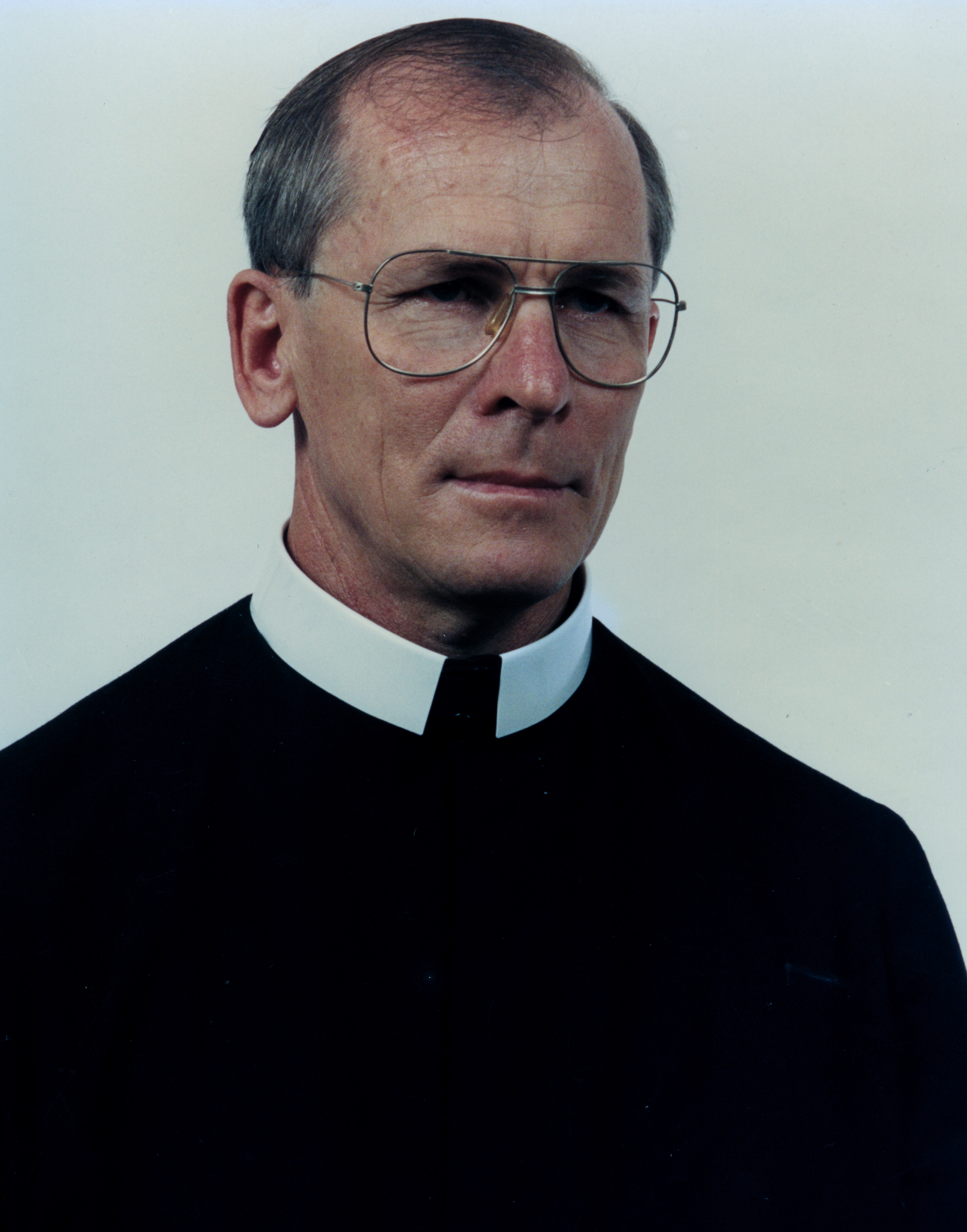
Dionisio Lachovicz as a new elected Protoarchimandrite of the O.S.B.M. in 1996

After returning from Italy, he had various pastoral assignments and served as a teacher and professor at the Basilian Institutes in Brazil. From 1991 to 1996 he worked in Ukraine as a professor at and then as rector of (beginning in 1994) the Basilian Theological studies in Zolochiv. From 1996 to 2004 he was the Protoarchimandrite (General Superior) of the Basilians in Rome.

On December 21, 2005, Fr. Lachovicz was confirmed by Pope Benedict XVI as a curial bishop, and he was consecrated to the episcopacy on February 26, 2006. The principal consecrator was Cardinal Lubomyr Husar, the Major Archbishop of the Ukrainian Greek Catholic Church at that time.

Catholic Church titles
Preceded by Isidore Patrylo	Protoarchimandrite of the Order of Saint Basil the Great; 1996–2004	Succeeded by Basilio Koubetch
Preceded by Norbert Trelle	Titular Bishop of Egnatia; 2005–present	Succeeded by Incumbent
Preceded by Hlib Lonchyna	Apostolic Visitor for the Ukrainian Greek Catholics in Italy; 2009–2019	Succeeded by Angelo Cardinal De Donatis (as Apostolic Administrator of the Ukrainian Catholic Apostolic Exarchate of Italy)
Preceded by Hlib Lonchyna	Apostolic Visitor for the Ukrainian Greek Catholics in Spain; 2009–2016	Succeeded by Carlos Cardinal Osoro Sierra (as Ordinary for the Faithful of Eastern Rite in Spain)
New title	Delegate with the rights of Apostolic Exarch of the Ukrainian Catholic Apostolic Exarchate of Italy; 2019–2020	Succeeded by himself as Apostolic Exarch
Preceded by Cardinal Angelo De Donatis (as Apostolic Administrator)	Apostolic Exarch of the Ukrainian Catholic Apostolic Exarchate of Italy; 2020–2025	Succeeded by Hryhoriy Komar (as Apostolic Administrator)
