= Hryhoriy Komar =

Ukrainian Greek Catholic bishop

- Titular Bishop of Acci
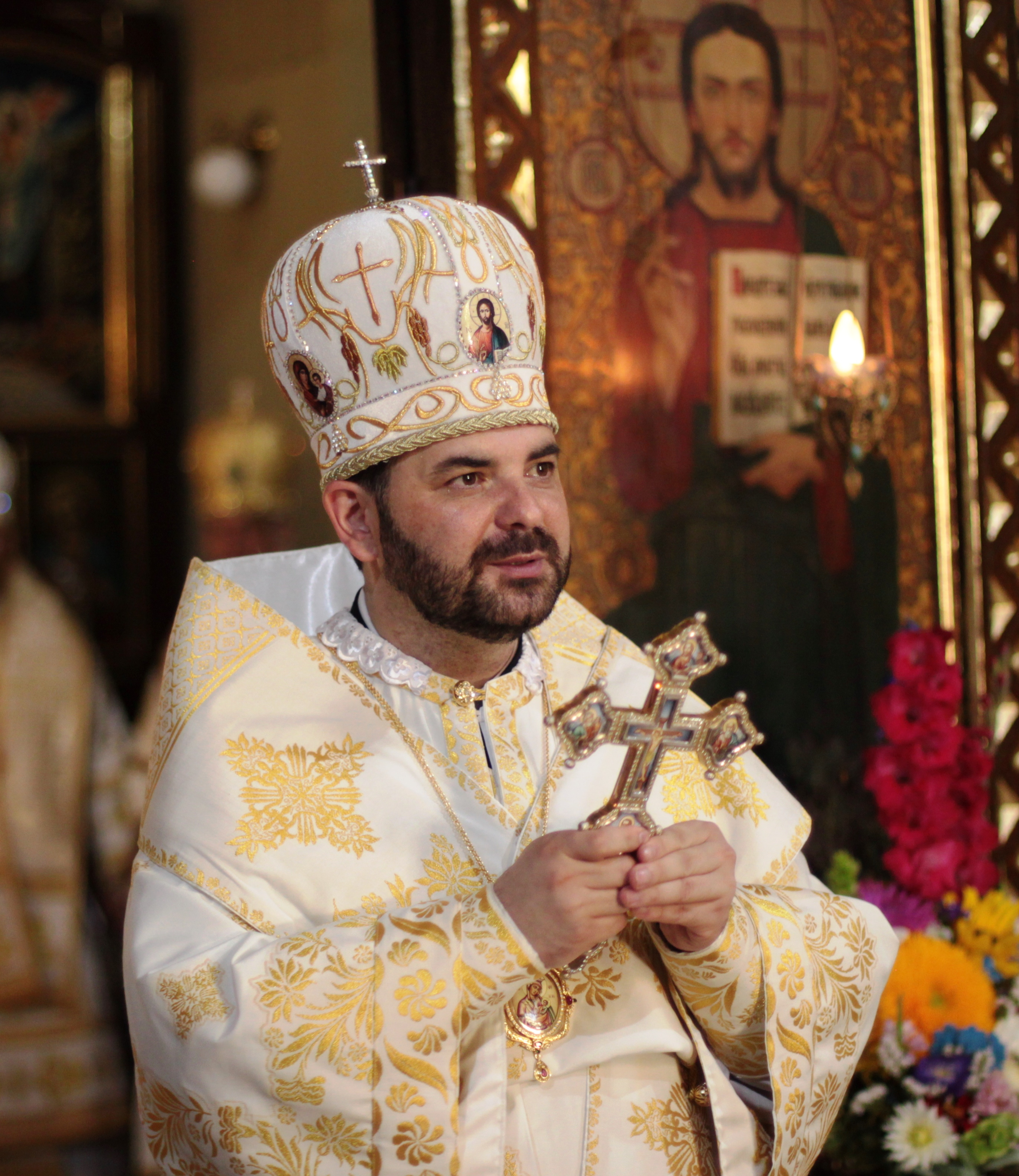
- Church: Ukrainian Greek Catholic Church
- Appointed: 25 June 2014
- Other post(s): Apostolic Administrator of the Ukrainian Catholic Apostolic Exarchate of Italy (since 2025)
- Previous post(s): Protosyncellus of the Eparchy of Sambir-Drohobych (2012–2025), Auxiliary Bishop of Ukrainian Catholic Eparchy of Sambir – Drohobych (2014–2025)

Orders
- Ordination: 22 April 2001 (Priest) by Yulian Voronovskyi
- Consecration: 22 August 2014 (Bishop) by Sviatoslav Shevchuk

Personal details
- Born: Hryhoriy Mykhaylovych Komar; 19 June 1976 (age 48); Letnya, Lviv Oblast, Ukrainian SSR

Bishop Hryhoriy Komar (Ukrainian: Григорій Комар, Anglicised as Gregory Komar; born 19 June 1976) is a Ukrainian Greek Catholic hierarch, who is currently serving as the Titular Bishop of Acci (since 25 June 2014) and Apostolic Administrator of the Ukrainian Catholic Apostolic Exarchate of Italy (since 7 March 2025). Previously he served as an Auxiliary bishop of Sambir – Drohobych (25 June 2014 – 7 March 2025).

== Life ==
Hryhoriy Komar was born in 1976 in Letnya, Drohobych Raion, Lviv Oblast, then Ukrainian SSR and after graduation of the school education, he joined the Theological Seminary in Lviv and then continued his studies in the Pontifical Oriental Institute in Rome, Italy.

After returning to Ukraine, he was ordained as deacon on 12 February 2001 and as priest on 22 April 2001. He served as teacher, prefect and subsequently (from July 2003 until June 2014) vice-rector in the Theological Seminary in Drohobych. At the same time, during 2004–2014 he served as a parish priest in the different parishes in Drohobych.

On 25 June 2014 he was confirmed by Pope Francis as an Auxiliary Bishop of Sambir – Drohobych, Ukraine and Titular Bishop of Acci. On 22 August 2014 he was consecrated as bishop by Major Archbishop Sviatoslav Shevchuk and other hierarchs of the Ukrainian Greek Catholic Church.

On 7 March 2025 he was appointed as an Apostolic Administrator of the Ukrainian Catholic Apostolic Exarchate of Italy.

Catholic Church titles
Preceded by Heinrich Fasching	Titular Bishop of Acci; 2014–	Incumbent
Preceded by Dionisio Lachovicz	Apostolic Administrator of the Ukrainian Catholic Apostolic Exarchate of Italy; 2025–	Incumbent
