= Ukrainian Catholic Cathedral of the Holy Family in Exile =

Coordinates: 51°30′48″N 0°09′02″W

The Ukrainian Catholic Cathedral of the Holy Family
- The Ukrainian Catholic Cathedral of the Holy Family
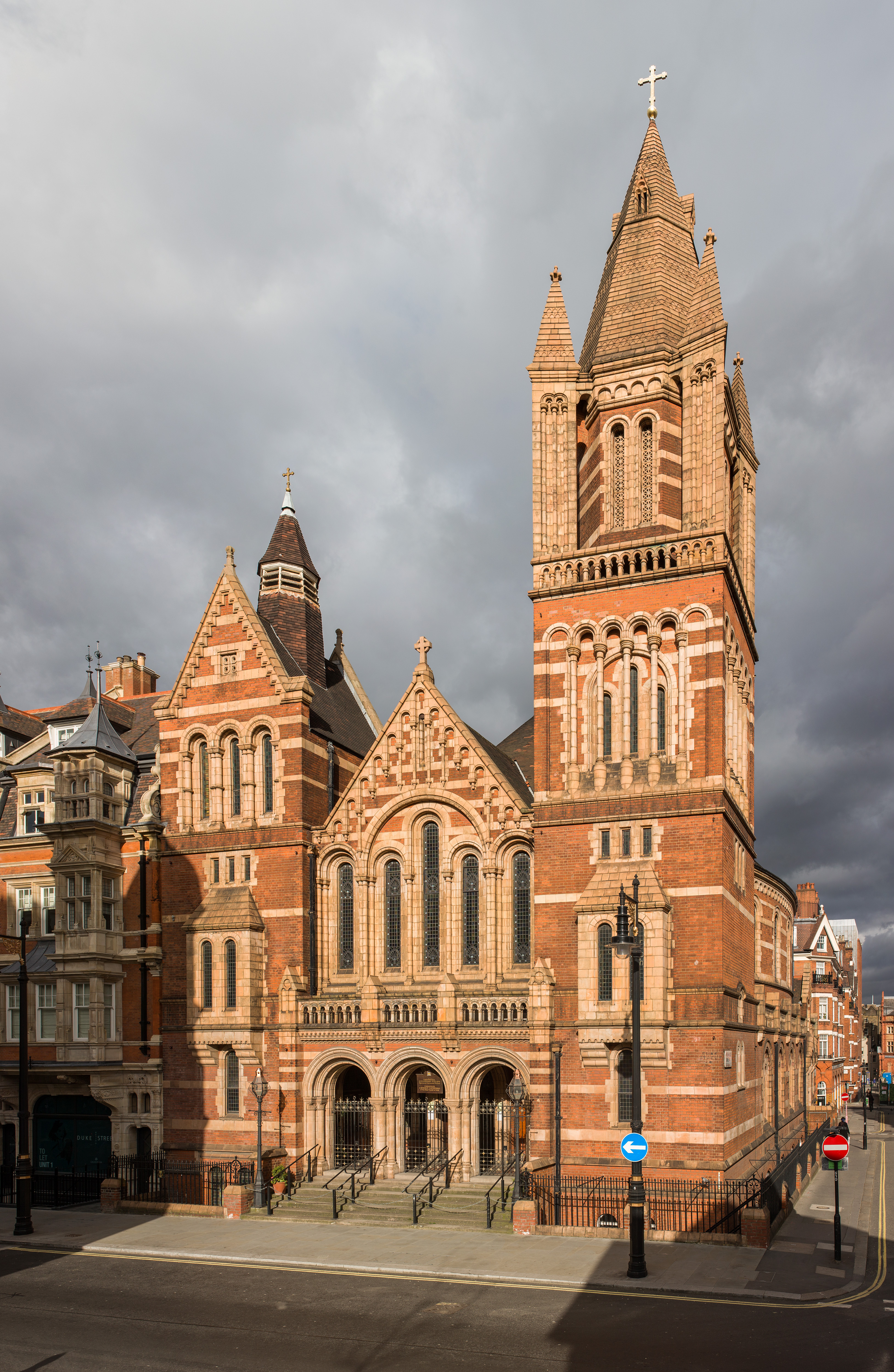

- Shown within Central London
- Location: London, W1K 5BQ; United Kingdom
- Denomination: Ukrainian Greek Catholic
- Website: www.ucc-gb.com/cathedral

History
- Consecrated: 1968

Architecture
- Architect: Alfred Waterhouse
- Style: Romanesque Revival
- Years built: 1889–1891

Specifications
- Capacity: 900

Administration
- Province: Eparchy of the Holy Family

Clergy
- Bishop: Kenneth Nowakowski

The Cathedral of the Holy Family, previously Ukrainian Catholic Cathedral of the Holy Family in Exile, (Ukrainian: Українська Католицька Катедра "Пресвятої Родини") is the cathedral of the Ukrainian Greek Catholic Eparchy of the Holy Family of London. It is the seat of the nation's Ukrainian Catholic eparchial bishop, and overlaps in jurisdiction with the Roman Catholic Archdiocese of Westminster, among others.

It was named after the Holy Family during their flight into Egypt. It is located at Duke Street (off Oxford Street), Mayfair, London, England. It is open for worship daily.

== History ==
The building it occupies was designed by Alfred Waterhouse in 1891 for the Congregational King's Weigh House congregation. The church is of red brick with buff terracotta dressings. It has an oval nave and a tower in the south-west corner, built in a Romanesque style.

The Congregational church sold it to the Ukrainian Catholics in 1967, to be the new headquarters of the local apostolic exarchate created in 1957 by Pope Pius XII. Internal adjustments were then made to adapt the building to Catholic liturgy. It includes an east window with glass by Robert Anning Bell and a confessional by J. F. Bentley from Westminster Cathedral. Waterhouse's building was Grade II* listed in 1970.

The cathedral was closed temporarily in 2007 when part of the ceiling collapsed, but has since been refurbished. The iconostasis created by a Ukrainian monk, Juvenalij Mokrytsky, was not affected by the ceiling's collapse.

On 18 January 2013 the exarchate was elevated to the rank of an eparchy (full bishopric) by Pope Benedict XVI.

The cathedral became a rallying point for the British Ukrainian community during the 2022 Russian invasion of Ukraine. The cathedral hosted addresses by political as well as religious figures, including the office of the Ukrainian Ambassador to the UK and the All Party Parliamentary Group for Ukraine, both invited by Bishop Kenneth Nowakowski.

== See also ==
- Parishes of the Eparchy of Holy Family of London for Ukrainians
- Paul Patrick Chomnycky
- Roman Catholicism in Great Britain
