= Egnatia =

Egnatia can refer to:

== In Greece ==
- Egnatia, Ioannina, municipality in the Ioannina regional unit
- Egnatia, Thessaloniki, in the Thessaloniki regional unit
- Via Egnatia, an ancient Roman road in Illyria, Macedonia and Thrace
- The A2 motorway, also known as Egnatia Odos, a modern highway in northern Greece

== Elsewhere ==
- Egnatia, Byzacena, former city and bishopric in Roman Africa, now in Tunisia and a Latin titular see
- Egnatia, an ancient town in Apulia (Puglia, southern Italy) and former bishopric as Egnazia Appula; now Gnatia (part of Fasano), and a Latin titular see

== Other ==
- Egnatia gens, an ancient Roman family
- KF Egnatia, a football team based in Rrogozhinë, Albania
