= Diocese of London (disambiguation) =

The Diocese of London is the Church of England (Anglican) diocese covering much of the north of Greater London, UK.

Diocese of London may also refer to different ecclesiastical jurisdictions, with distinct episcopal sees and/or different Christian denominations:

== England ==
- Roman Catholic Archdiocese of Westminster, the Latin Catholic diocese for northern Greater London, UK.
- Ukrainian Catholic Eparchy of the Holy Family of London, Byzantine Rite eparchy for all of the United Kingdom

== Canada ==
- Roman Catholic Diocese of London, Ontario

== See also ==
- Bishop of London, Anglican and former Roman Catholic bishops of the English diocese
