= Yaroslav Pryriz =

Ukrainian Eastern Catholic bishop (born 1963)

Yaroslav Pryriz CSsR
- Eparchy of Sambir – Drohobych
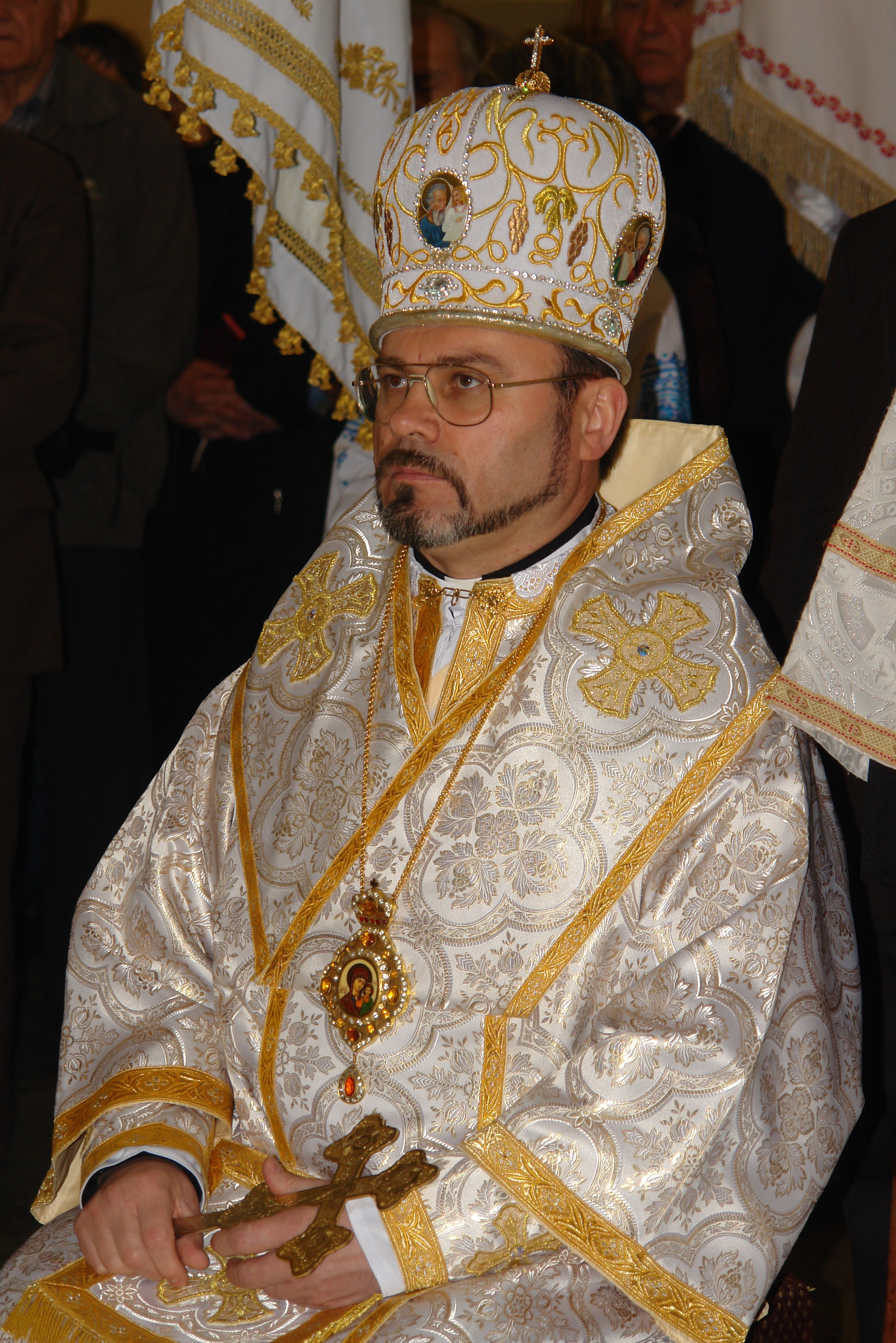
- Church: Ukrainian Greek Catholic Church
- In office: 27 October 2011–present
- Predecessor: Yulian Voronovskyi

Orders
- Ordination: 4 December 1988 (Priest) by Mykhaylo Sabryha
- Consecration: 29 April 2006 (Bishop) by Lubomyr Husar

Personal details
- Born: Yaroslav Mykolayovych Pryriz; 30 March 1963 (age 63) Lastivka, Ukrainian SSR

Bishop Yaroslav Pryriz CSsR (Ukrainian: Ярослав Приріз; born 30 March 1963 in Lastivka, Turka Raion, Lviv Oblast, Ukrainian SSR) is the Eparchial bishop of Ukrainian Catholic Eparchy of Sambir – Drohobych since 27 October 2011.

Coat of arms of Bishop Yaroslav Pryriz

== Life ==
Working at a state job as a technician, he simultaneously studied in the underground seminary in Lviv. On 4 December 1988 he received priestly ordination at the hands of Bishop Mykhaylo Sabryha. Then he joined the Redemptorists Congregation in 1992.

On 29 April 2006 he received episcopal consecration at the hands of Major Archbishop Lubomyr Husar. He was appointed Auxiliary bishop of the Ukrainian Catholic Eparchy of Sambir – Drohobych with title of Auzia. On 21 April 2010 he was elected as the Coadjutor bishop at the same Eparchy.

Since 27 October 2011 he is serving as the Eparch of this Eparchy.

Catholic Church titles
Preceded by Yulian Voronovskyi	Eparch of Sambir – Drohobych; 27 October 2011–present	Incumbent
