= St Andrew's Ukrainian Catholic Church =

Our Lady of Pochayiv and St Andrew's Ukrainian Catholic Church
- Українська католицька церква Св. Андрія
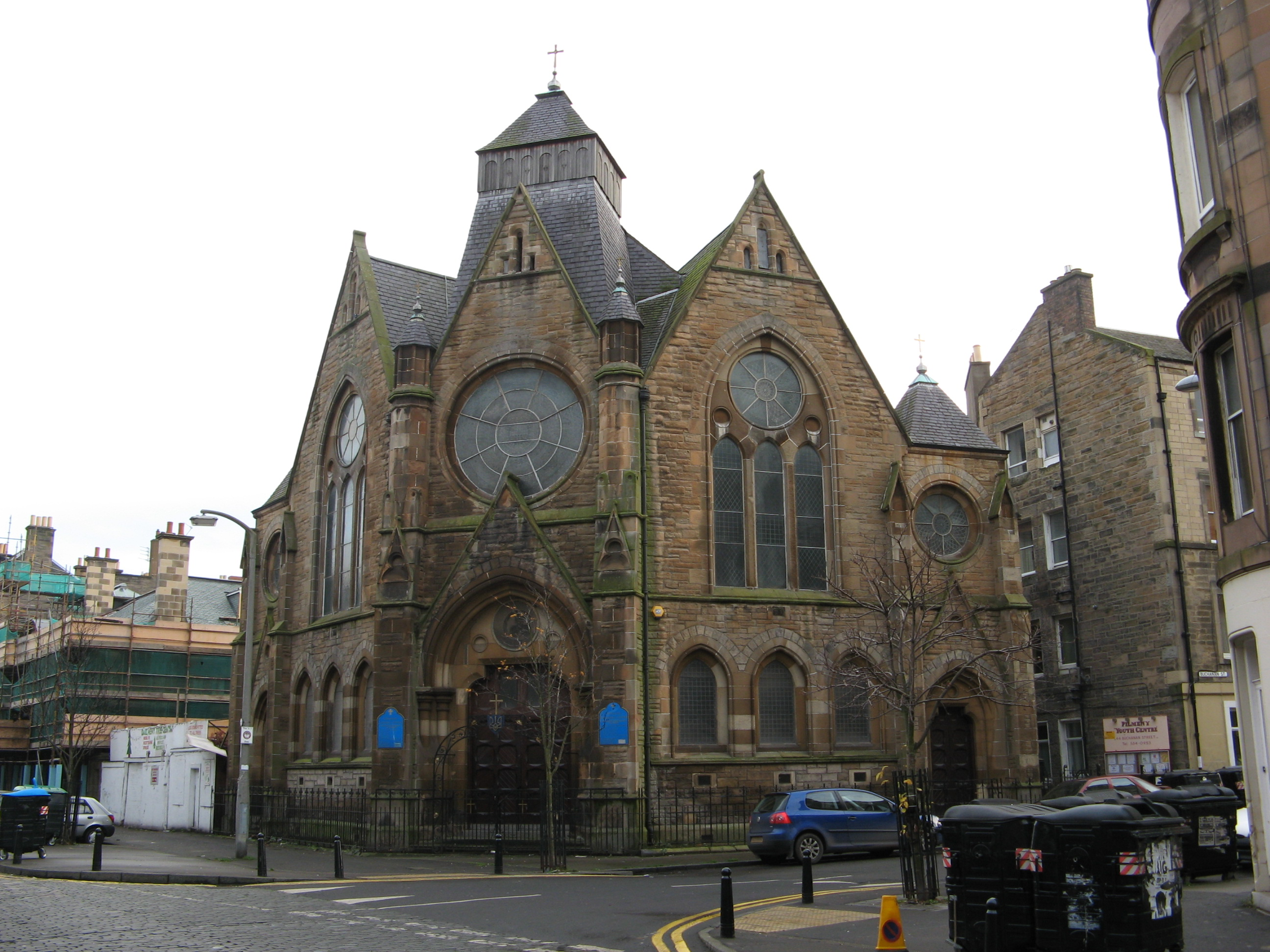
- The Church, seen from Dalmeny Street in Leith
- Our Lady of Pochayiv and St Andrew's Ukrainian Catholic Church
- 55°57′53″N 3°10′30″W
- Location: Leith, Edinburgh
- Country: Scotland
- Denomination: Catholic
- Previous denomination: Presbyterian
- Tradition: Ukrainian Greek Catholic Church
- Website: churchedinburgh.blogspot.com

History
- Former name(s): Colston Street U.P. Church, Dalmeny Street U.P. Church, Dalmeny Street U.F. Church
- Founded: 1965
- Dedication: Saint Andrew and Our Lady of Pochayiv

Clergy
- Priest: Rev. Fr. Vasyl Kren

Our Lady of Pochayiv and St Andrew's Ukrainian Catholic Church (Ukrainian: Українська католицька церква Св. Андрія) is situated on Dalmeny Street, Leith in Edinburgh. It is one of the few Ukrainian Greek Catholic parish churches in Scotland. It is a church in the only Eastern Catholic eparchy in Great Britain, the Ukrainian Catholic Eparchy of the Holy Family of London. It is a Category B listed building.

== Early history ==
The site was secured for use as a church by the United Presbyterian Church in March 1879, to serve the rapidly growing population in the new tenements around Leith Walk who were not well served by existing U.P. Churches. A temporary church hall was built in that year and a congregation established from existing U.P. members in the neighbourhood. It took until June 1881 to secure a minister, George B. Carr from the parish of Tranent. The sandstone Gothic Revival building was built for the congregation and was opened on 6 October 1882 to a design adapted by Archibald Thomson from an original version by Sloan & Balderston in 1822. At this time, Dalmeny Street was known as Colston Street, after James Colston, Esq., the treasurer of the Corporation of the City of Edinburgh.

With the merger of the United Presbyterian and the Free Church of Scotland in 1900, the Church passed to the United Free Church of Scotland. The majority of the United Free Church merged with the established Church of Scotland in 1929, and Dalmeny Street followed after this. The Church was vacated by 1950, with the congregation merging with nearby Pilrig to form Pilrig and Dalmeny, now Pilrig St. Paul's.

== As the Ukrainian Church ==
A Ukrainian diaspora community arrived in England, Scotland, and Wales after World War II. It included former veterans of the SS Division Galicia, but also many other anti-communist civilian refugees who arrived from displaced persons camps in West Germany as part of the European Voluntary Workers labour scheme. In 1950, The Scotsman newspaper reported there were approximately 1,500 Ukrainians living in Scotland, with 7–800 in Edinburgh alone.

The first Ukrainian Catholic mission was opened in 1965 by Mitred Priest Mycola Matyczak. The local Ukrainian community "in work and finance, supported the project, to transform the interior of the building into a beautiful Catholic church, with a large icon of Saint Andrew over the main altar."

In 1983, in advance of the 1988 celebration of 1,000 years of Catholicism in Ukraine, the Church was refurbished, including a new wooden belfry and steeple in an Eastern Catholic style and ornamental ironwork on the perimeter which includes the tryzub Coat of arms of Ukraine. The congregation at this time was reported to number 700.
