= St Mary's Ukrainian Catholic Church, Manchester =

Church in United Kingdom

Coordinates: 53.51455°N 2.24799°W

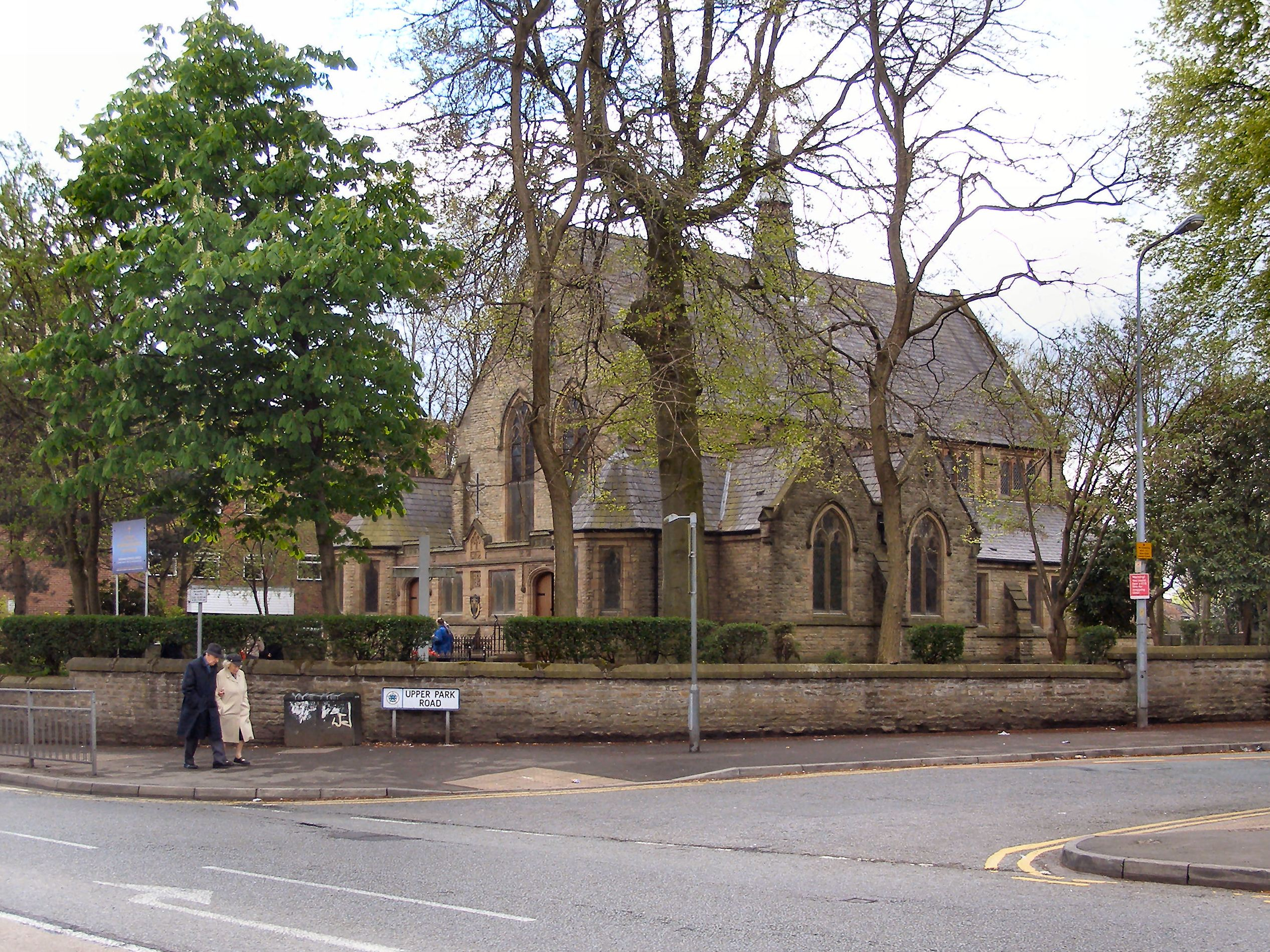
Dormition of our Lady Ukrainian Catholic Church

Dormition of our Lady Ukrainian Catholic Church, Manchester is situated on Bury Old Road, close to its junction with Middleton Road and Leicester Road in North Manchester, England.

It is under the jurisdiction of the Ukrainian Catholic Eparchy of the Holy Family of London of the Ukrainian Greek Catholic Church.
