= Ukrainian Catholic Eparchy of Sambir–Drohobych =

Ukrainian Catholic eparchy in western Ukraine

Coordinates: 49.4500°N 22.9500°E

Eparchy of Sambir – Drohobych Eparchia Samboriensis–Drohobychiensis Ucrainorum Українська Греко-Католицька Самбірсько-Дрогобицька Єпархія
- Coat of arms of Sambir–Drohobych

Location
- Territory: 6 Raions of Lviv Oblast
- Ecclesiastical province: Archeparchy of Lviv
- Headquarters: Drohobych, Lviv Oblast, Ukraine

Statistics
- Area: 6,900 km^{2} (2,700 sq mi)
- Population: Total; Catholics: (as of 2014); 598,180; 396,721 (66.3%)

Information
- Sui iuris church: Ukrainian Greek Catholic
- Rite: Byzantine
- Established: 20 April 1993 (re-established)
- Cathedral: Ukrainian Catholic Cathedral of Holy Trinity

Current leadership
- Pope: Francis
- Major Archbishop: Major Archbishop Sviatoslav Shevchuk
- Bishop: Yaroslav Pryriz Bishop of the Ukrainian Catholic Eparchy of Sambir-Drohobych.
- Metropolitan Archbishop: Ihor Vozniak Metropolitan of the Ukrainian Catholic Archeparchy of Lviv

Map

Website
- Ukrainian Catholic Eparchy of Sambir-Drohobych

The Eparchy of Sambir – Drohobych is an eparchy of the Ukrainian Greek Catholic Church, in the ecclesiastical province of Kyiv-Halych.

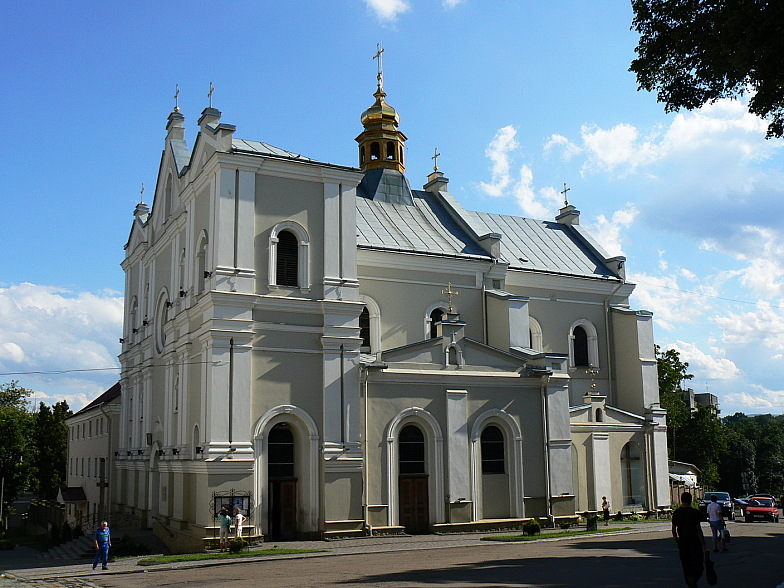
Seat of the Eparchy: The Cathedral of Holy Trinity

The first eparch was Yulian Voronovskyi, M.S.U., who was appointed to this position by Pope John Paul II on 30 March 1994, having previously been as Archiepiscopal Administrator of the eparchy from its inception in 1993.

Eparch Yaroslav Pryriz C.S.S.R., who had been Coadjutor Bishop of the Eparchy, became Eparch when Sviatoslav Shevchuk, Major Archbishop of Kyiv-Halych (Kyiv), Ukraine, with the consent of the Permanent Synod meeting in Curitiba, Brazil, on Saturday, 10 September 2011, and having informed the Apostolic See, accepted the resignation of Eparch Voronovskyi.

== History ==
- 20 April 1993: Re-established as Eparchy of Sambir – Drohobych from the Ukrainian Catholic Archeparchy of Lviv in the territories of the former Ukrainian Catholic Eparchy of Przemyśl, Sambir and Sanok.

== Eparchial and auxiliary bishops ==
The following is a list of the bishops of Sambir – Drohobych and their terms of service:

- (20 Apr 1993 – 30 Mar 1994) Yulian Voronovskyi, M.S.U., titular bishop of Deultum, Archiepiscopal Administrator
- (30 Mar 1994 – 10 Sep 2011) Yulian Voronovskyi, M.S.U.

(2 Mar 2006 – 21 Apr 2010) Yaroslav Pryriz C.S.S.R., titular bishop of Auzia, auxiliary
(21 Apr 2010 – 10 Sep 2011) Yaroslav Pryriz C.S.S.R., coadjutor bishop

- (since 10 Sep 2011 – ) Yaroslav Pryriz C.S.S.R.

(25 Jun 2014 – 7 March 2025) Hryhoriy Komar, titular bishop of Acci, auxiliary
