= Constance Coltman =

British Christian minister

Constance Coltman - fair use

Constance Mary Coltman (née Todd; 23 May 1889 – 26 March 1969) was one of the first women ordained to Christian ministry in Britain. She practised within the Congregational Church. A decade earlier Gertrude von Petzold became minister at Narborough Road Free Christian (Unitarian) church, Leicester, after studying at Manchester College, Oxford. A generation earlier, in 1880, the Glasgow Universalists ordained Caroline Soule. (The Methodists and Quakers had women preachers from much earlier.)

== Early life ==
Born in Putney in London, Constance Todd grew up in a Presbyterian family who attended the Putney Presbyterian Church. After attending Saint Felix School, Southwold as a boarder, she read history in Somerville College, Oxford from 1908 to 1911.

== Call to ministry ==
She became conscious of her call to ministry, but was told that it would be impossible in the Presbyterian Church of England. In 1909, the Congregational Council considered the question of ordaining women, after discussions on the possibility of women deacons and elders occurred in the Presbyterian and Congregational churches. The principal of the (then) Congregational college, Mansfield College, Oxford, William Boothby Selbie, was persuaded that her call was genuine and in 1913 she was accepted as a student there, where she obtained her London Bachelor of Divinity degree.

Her candidacy for the Ministry of Word and Sacraments was tested and accepted by the King's Weigh House congregation in Mayfair London. She and Claud Coltman were ordained there by the Congregational Union of England and Wales on 17 September 1917. The ordination was presided by William E. Orchard (a Presbyterian who later became a Roman Catholic priest) and assisted by Congregationalist ministers. The following day, Constance and Claud married; she was subsequently known as Constance Coltman.

The couple then ministered jointly at King's Weigh House. The two of them ministered in Kilburn 1922–23, Cowley Road, Oxford 1924–32, Wolverton 1932–40, and Haverhill 1940–46, then returning to King's Weigh House where they served until 1949. Her husband retired in 1957 and they moved to Bexhill-on-Sea where Constance died in 1969.

== Legacy ==
She was not a campaigner, but supported younger women who felt called to ministry, and helped found the Fellowship of Women Ministers and the Society for the Ministry of Women. She was a friend of Maude Royden, who supported the ordination of women in the Anglican Communion, and contributed a chapter to Royden's book The Church and Women (1924). Both Constance and Claud were convinced pacifists throughout their lives.

== Bibliography ==
- United Reformed Church (2004) A Gift Box. ISBN 0-85346-222-4.
- Oxford Dictionary of National Biography: Constance Coltman
