= William E. Orchard =

Preacher and theologian (1877–1955)

William Edwin Orchard (20 November 1877 – 12 June 1955) was first a Presbyterian, then Congregationalist minister, who subsequently converted to the Roman Catholic Church and was ordained a priest of this Church. He was a renowned liturgist, pacifist and ecumenicist.

== Youth ==
He was born on 20 November 1877 in Linslade, Buckinghamshire to John (a railway employee) and Fanny (née Braggins) Orchard. As a teenager William attended the Presbyterian Church of England in Willesden with his family. The minister of this congregation, Charles Anderson Scott, led him to consider becoming a minister himself. He then worked as a lay minister at St Paul's Presbyterian Church on the Isle of Dogs and after two years of training there was accepted at Westminster College, Cambridge. He was ordained in 1904 to the ministry of St Paul's Presbyterian Church, Enfield and married Annie Maria Hewitt on 3 August 1904.

== Protestant minister ==
He gained at Enfield a great reputation as a preacher, and as a member of the new theology movement. He was awarded the degrees of Doctor of Divinity from London University, and published in 1909 a thesis titled "Modern Theories of Sin". But by 1910, he discovered sacramental theology and began to develop new forms of worship, publishing in 1913 a prayerbook, "the Temple", published by J. M. Dent & Sons.

In 1914, Orchard became the minister at King's Weigh House Congregational church in Mayfair, London, a congregation experiencing a crisis at the time. Under his leadership, attendance grew, and there he continued his work of introducing Catholic elements into Protestant worship and advocating such practices through the ecumenical Society of Free Catholics. He was also a renowned pacifist. In 1917 he presided at the ordination of Constance Todd, one of the first woman ordained for Christian ministry in England in modern times. In 1919, his "Order of Divine Service for Public Worship", an ecumenical liturgy drawing on various Catholic, Eastern Orthodox and Anglican sources, was published by the Oxford University Press.

His wife Annie died in 1920, triggering a psychological crisis in her husband. Orchard continued as minister to King's Weigh House until early 1932, when his project of transforming this high-church Protestant congregation into an ecumenical "bridge church" was rejected after years of negotiations. Orchard then saw conversion to the Catholic Church as the only way forward.

== Catholic priest ==
William Orchard was received into the Roman Catholic Church in Rome on 2 June 1932, followed by many of his congregants. He subsequently wrote an account of his conversion, From Faith to Faith, in 1933. He was ordained as a Roman Catholic priest in 1935 and became an itinerant preacher, apologist for the Catholic faith, missioner and writer both in Britain and America. Tired by his many travels, he became in 1943 the chaplain to a community of Cistercian nuns in Brownshill, Gloucestershire. Father William Orchard died there of cancer on 12 June 1955. He is buried in the cemetery of the Dominican priory in Woodchester.

== Works ==
- Oracles of God: studies in the Minor Prophets online version
- The Finality of Christ and other sermons (1921) online version
- Foundations of Faith (1924)
- The Evolution of Old Testament Religion
