= Kenneth Nowakowski =

Ukrainian-Canadian Greek Catholic bishop

Kenneth Nowakowski OBE
- Eparch of Ukrainian Catholic Eparchy of Holy Family of London
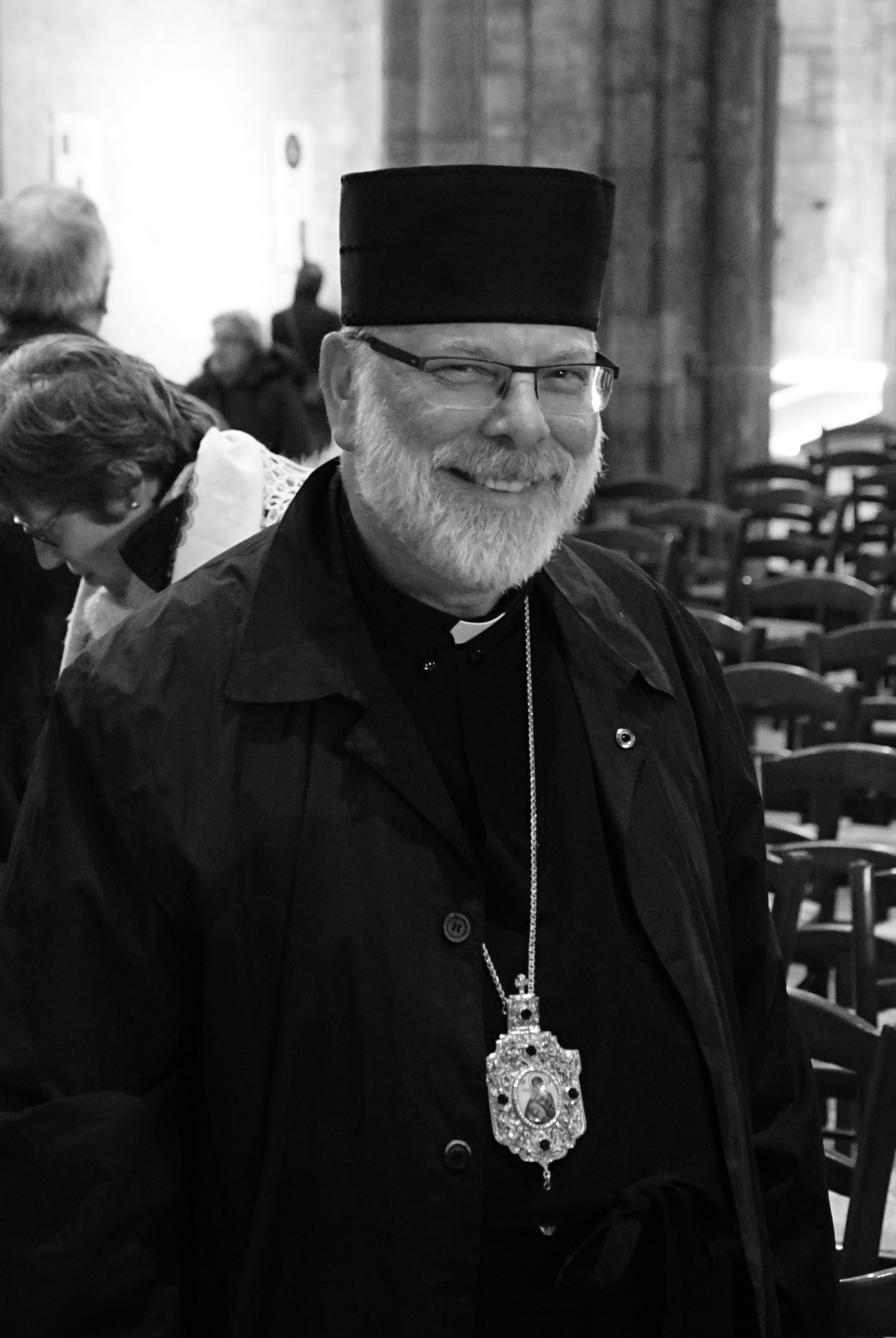
- Church: Ukrainian Greek Catholic Church
- Metropolis: Immediately subject to the Holy See
- Appointed: 15 January 2020
- Installed: 21 March 2020
- Predecessor: Hlib Lonchyna
- Previous post: Eparch of New Westminster (2007-2020)

Orders
- Ordination: 19 August 1989 by Basil Filevich
- Consecration: 24 July 2007 by Lawrence Daniel Huculak

Personal details
- Born: Kenneth Anthony Adam Nowakowski; 16 May 1958 (age 68) North Battleford, Saskatchewan, Canada
- Motto: Deus caritas est
- Coat of arms

Kenneth Anthony Adam Nowakowski OBE (Ukrainian: Кен Новаківський, born May 16, 1958, North Battleford, Saskatchewan) is the bishop of the Ukrainian Catholic Eparchy of Holy Family of London. He was ordained a priest on August 19, 1989 at St. George's Cathedral in Saskatoon, SK and a bishop on July 24, 2007 in Vancouver, BC. On January 15, 2020, he was appointed as bishop of Ukrainian Catholic Eparchy of Holy Family of London.

== Honours ==
On the 13th of June 2025 (2025 Birthday Honours), Bishop Kenneth Nowakowski was appointed an Officer of the Order of the British Empire for "services to Ukrainians".
