= Yulian Voronovskyi =

- Eparchy of Sambir – Drohobych
- Church: Ukrainian Greek Catholic Church
- In office: 30 March 1994 – 27 October 2011
- Predecessor: New creation
- Successor: Yaroslav Pryriz
- Other post: Hegumen of Univ Lavra of the Studite Rite (1982-1990)

Orders
- Ordination: 27 Oct 1968 (Priest) by Vasyl Velychkovsky
- Consecration: 30 Sep 1986 (Bishop) by Volodymyr Sterniuk

Personal details
- Born: Yuriy Ivanovych Voronovskyi; 5 May 1936 Humnyska, Second Polish Republic
- Died: 28 February 2013 (aged 76) Lviv, Ukraine

Bishop Yulian Voronovskyi (also exist Romanization as Julian Voronovsky, Ukrainian: Юліан Вороновський; 5 May 1936 in Humnyska, Second Polish Republic, now is Zolochiv Raion, Lviv Oblast, Ukraine – 28 February 2013 in Lviv) was the Eparchial bishop of Ukrainian Catholic Eparchy of Sambir-Drohobych from 30 March 1994 to 27 October 2011.

== Biography ==
In 1958 he entered the clandestine Studite Brethren monastery. Working at a state job, he simultaneously studied in the underground seminary in Lviv. On 27 October 1968 he received priestly ordination at the hands of Archbishop Vasyl Velychkovsky. Than he was Hegumen (superior) of the Studite monastery.

On 30 September 1986 he received episcopal consecration at the hands of Archbishop Volodymyr Sterniuk. He was appointed Auxiliary bishop of the Ukrainian Catholic Archeparchy of Lviv. In 1990 he was elected the archimandrite of the Univ Holy Dormition Lavra of the Studite Rite and the Rector of Holy Spirit Seminary in Lviv.

On 20 July 1993 he was appointed the Administrator of the newly created Ukrainian Catholic Eparchy of Sambir-Drohobych, and from 1994-2011 was its Eparch.

Voronovskyi died on 28 February 2013, after undergoing surgery without regaining consciousness in the intensive care department of the Lviv regional hospital. He was 76.

Catholic Church titles
Preceded by Yuriy Makar	Hegumen of the Univ Holy Dormition Lavra of the Studite Rite; 1982–1990	Succeeded by Petro Hladiy
Preceded by Yuriy Makar	Archimandrite of the Univ Holy Dormition Lavra of the Studite Rite; 1990	Succeeded by Vacant
New title	Titular Bishop of Deultum; 1991–1994	Succeeded by Ignatius Anthony Catanello
Preceded by Fylymon Kurchaba	Rector of the Major Theological Seminary in Lviv; 1991–1993	Succeeded by Stepan Meniok
New title	Archepiscopal Administrator of Ukrainian Catholic Eparchy of Sambir – Drohobych; 1993–1994	Succeeded by himself as Eparchial Bishop
Preceded by himself as Archepiscopal Administrator	Eparchial Bishop of Sambir – Drohobych; 1994–2011	Succeeded by Yaroslav Pryriz
