= Hlib Lonchyna =

Ukrainian-American Greek Catholic bishop

The Right Reverend Hlib Lonchyna MSU
- Bishop Emeritus of the Eparchy of the Holy Family of London
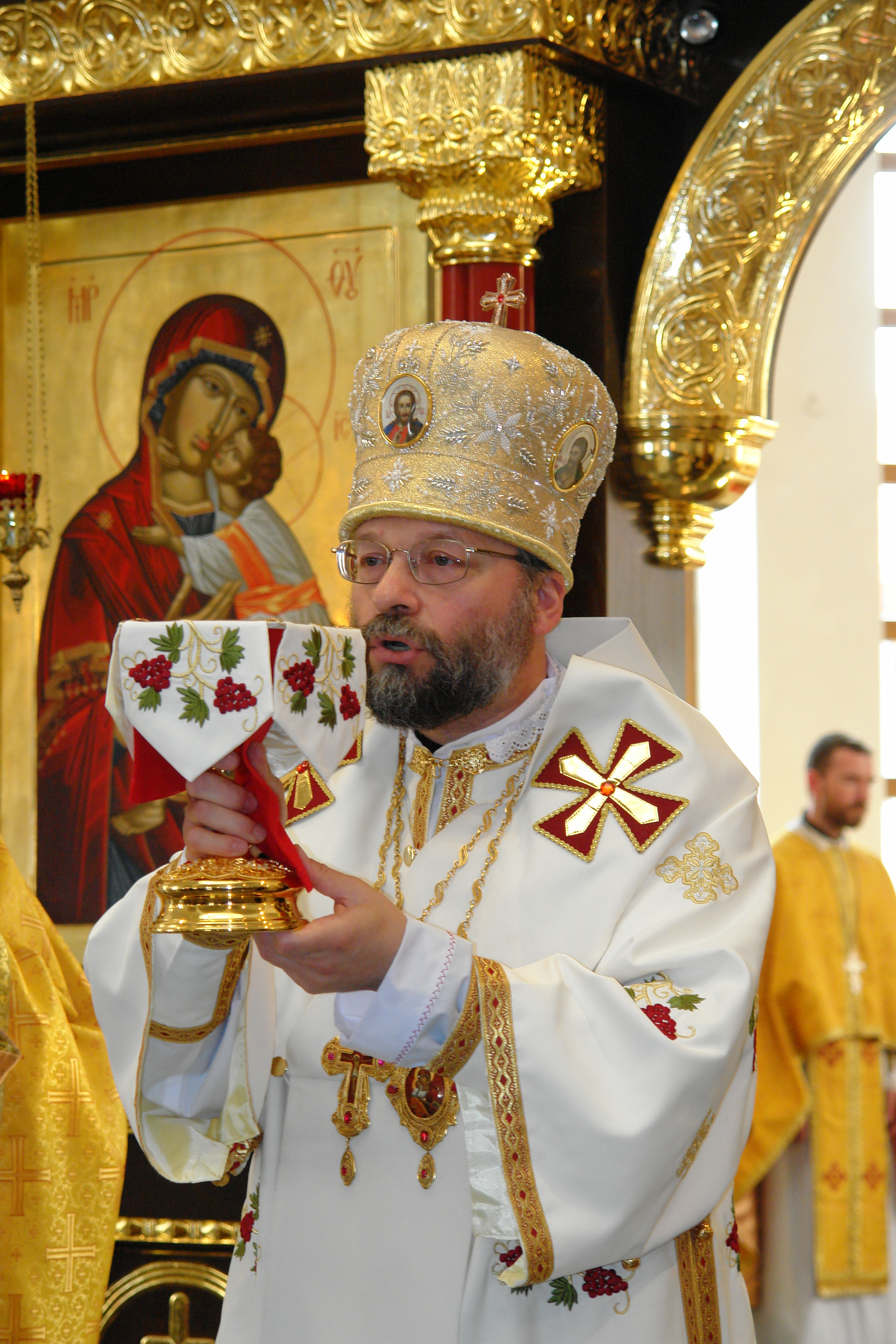
- Native name: Гліб Лончина
- Appointed: 14 June 2011
- Installed: 2 August 2011
- Term ended: 1 September 2019
- Predecessor: Paul Patrick Chomnycky
- Successor: Kenneth Nowakowski
- Previous posts: Titular Bishop of Bareta (2002 – 2013); Auxiliary Bishop of Kyiv-Halyč (2004 – 2009); Auxiliary Bishop of Lviv (2002 – 2004)

Orders
- Ordination: 3 July 1977 by Yosyf Slipyi
- Consecration: 27 February 2002 by Lubomyr Husar

Personal details
- Born: Borys Sviatoslav Lonchyna; 23 February 1954 (age 72) Steubenville, Ohio, United States
- Denomination: Ukrainian Greek Catholic
- Coat of arms

Bishop Hlib Lonchyna (Note: Ukrainian: Гліб Лончина, romanized: Hlib Lonchyna) (born Borys Sviatoslav Lonchyna, (Note: Ukrainian: Борис Святослав Лончина, romanized: Borys Sviatoslav Lonchyna) 23 February 1954) is eparchial Bishop Emeritus of the Ukrainian Catholic Eparchy of the Holy Family of London since 1 September 2019. He had served as bishop from 18 January 2013. Previously, he served as the Apostolic Exarch for Ukrainian Catholics in Great Britain since 14 June 2011.

Lonchyna, was born to Ukrainian parents in Steubenville, Ohio within the Eparchy of Saint Josaphat in Parma for Ukrainians. He attended the Pontifical Urbanian University in Rome where in 1979 he obtained a degree in biblical theology and the Pontifical Oriental Institute, graduating in Eastern liturgical theology in 2001.

In 1975 he entered the monastery of Grottaferrata of Ukrainian Studite Monks, where he made his final vows 19 December 1976. He was ordained a priest 3 July 1977. He worked in the parish of St. Nicholas in Passaic, New Jersey and then was prefect of the students of the College of St. Sophia in Rome.

After his arrival in Ukraine in 1994, he was the spiritual director of the Major Seminary in Lviv. At the same time he taught at the Lviv Theological Academy. He served as associate in the local Аpostolic Nunciature to Ukraine in Kyiv.

On 11 January 2002 Hlib Lonchyna was appointed titular bishop of Bareta and auxiliary bishop of Lviv. Cardinal Lubomyr Husar consecrated him on 27 February. On 14 January 2003 he was appointed apostolic visitor for the Greek–Ukrainian Catholics in Italy and as the major archbishop's procurator in Rome. On 4 March 2004 he also became apostolic visitor in Spain and Ireland.

On 25 March 2006 he returned to Ukraine, in charge of Consecrated Life, maintaining the commitment of apostolic visitor in Italy, Spain and Ireland. On 7 January 2009 he was replaced as apostolic visitor in Italy and Spain. On 2 June 2009 he was appointed apostolic administrator "sede vacante" of the Apostolic Exarchate for Ukrainian Catholics in Britain. He took part in the election of the new major archbishop in 2011 after Cardinal Husar's retirement.

He was formally named apostolic exarch by Pope Benedict XVI on 14 June 2011, and installed on August 2, 2011. When the Apostolic Exarchate of Great Britain became the Eparchy of the Holy Family of London, he was named its first bishop.

He resigned on 1 September 2019, and was succeeded by Kenneth Nowakowski.

== Notes ==
Preceded by Paul Chomnycky	Apostolic Exarch for Ukrainians in Great Britain; 2011 to 2013	Succeeded by Title elevated
Preceded by New title	Eparchial Bishop of the Eparchy of Holy Family of London; 2013 to 2019	Succeeded by Kenneth Nowakowski
