= Egnatia, Byzacena =

Africa Proconsularis (125 AD)

Egnatia, Byzacena is an ancient civitas of the Roman Province of Byzacena in North Africa. The exact location of the town is not known, but was in the Sahel region of Tunisia.

The town was in ancient times the seat of an ancient Roman Catholic bishopric. Today the bishopric survives as a titular Bishopric and the current bishop of the town is Dionisio Lachovicz.
