= Eparchy of the Holy Family of London =

Ukrainian Greek Catholic eparchy in Great Britain and Ireland

Eparchy of the Holy Family of London Eparchia Sanctae Familiae Londiniensis Name in other languages: Єпархія Пресвятої Родини у Лондоні (in Ukrainian); Yeparkhiya Presvyatoyi Rodyny u Londoni (in Ukrainian)
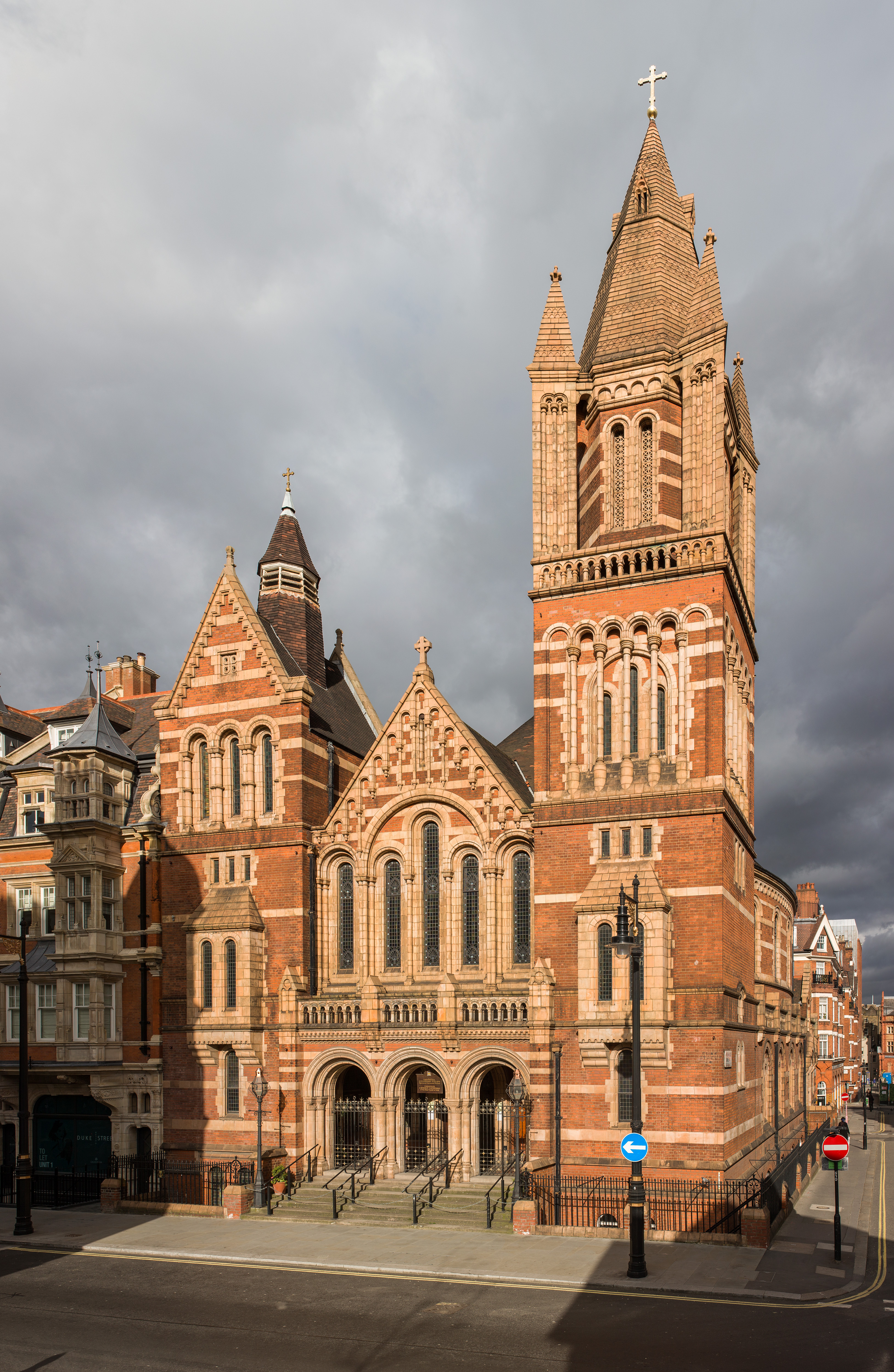
- Ukrainian Catholic Cathedral of the Holy Family in Exile, Duke Street, London.

- Coat of arms

Location
- Country: United Kingdom
- Territory: Entirety of Great Britain and Ireland
- Ecclesiastical province: Not part of any ecclesiastical province
- Metropolitan: Major Archeparch of Kyiv-Galicia

Statistics
- Area: 229,848 km^{2} (88,745 sq mi)
- Population: Total; Catholics: (as of 2014); 69,003,000; 30,000 (0.025%)
- Parishes: 18

Information
- Denomination: Catholic Church
- Sui iuris church: Ukrainian Greek Catholic
- Rite: Byzantine Rite
- Established: 10 June 1957
- Cathedral: Cathedral of the Holy Family in Exile
- Patron saint: Holy Family
- Secular priests: 17

Current leadership
- Pope: Leo XIV
- Major Archbishop: Sviatoslav Shevchuk
- Eparch: Kenneth Nowakowski
- Bishops emeritus: Hlib Lonchyna

The Eparchy of the Holy Family of London (Ukrainian: Єпархія Пресвятої Родини у Лондоні; Latin: Eparchia Sanctae Familiae Londiniensis) is an eparchy of the Ukrainian Greek Catholic Church which is an Eastern Catholic Church that is in full communion with the Holy See. Its territorial remit includes the entirety of the islands of Great Britain and Ireland. The episcopal seat is the Cathedral of the Holy Family in Exile which is situated in London. The incumbent eparch, Kenneth Nowakowski, was appointed on 15 January 2020.

Initially erected as an exarchate, it gained eparchial status (equivalent to a diocese in the Latin Church) on 18 January 2013. Due to the comparatively small number of faithful in the eparchy, fewer services, such as schools and care centres, are provided.

== History ==
=== Antecedents ===
Since the late 19th century many Ukrainians have migrated to England, most notably to London and the Red Bank area of Manchester. These migrants have been known as 'old immigrants', or stari emihranty.

After the Second World War more migrants came to the British Isles from Eastern Europe, among them numerous Ukrainian Catholics, as most of the Ukrainian immigrants were from Western Ukraine. Initially, many of the Eastern European Catholics worshipped in industrial hostels, as these were common locations where immigrants found cheaper accommodation. Some also worshipped in local Latin Church parish churches, but not in their Byzantine liturgy.

However, eventually, Ukrainian Greek Catholics were able to organize worship in their own Byzantine liturgy, often in the local Latin Church parish church. In Coventry, by 1948, the Church of Christ the King in Coundon started having Ukrainian Catholic services. These were soon transferred to St Elizabeth Church in Foleshill. In 1957, the Apostolic Exarchate was established for Ukrainian Catholics in England and Wales.

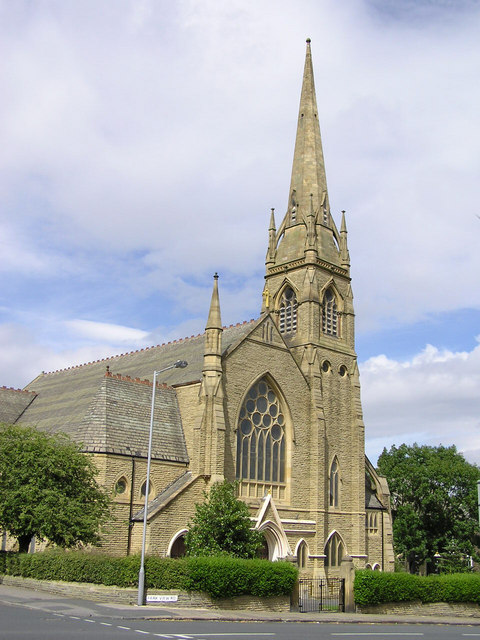
Church of the Most Holy Trinity and Our Lady of Pochaiv, Bradford, West Yorkshire

=== Apostolic Exarchate ===
The eparchy was erected on 10 June 1957 as an apostolic exarchate for the faithful of the Ukrainian Greek Catholic Church in England and Wales. On 12 May 1968 the exarchate's remit was extended to the whole of Great Britain, including Scotland (not Northern Ireland).

By 1959, over 700 Ukrainian Catholics had registered themselves in Coventry. In the Midlands, there was a Ukrainian Catholic priest celebrating Ukrainian-rite services for the Ukrainian faithful in Coventry, as well as in Rugby, Gloucester, Bristol, Birmingham and Cheltenham.

With the help of Cardinal John Heenan, Bishop Hornyak was able to secure the King's Weigh House, a former Congregational chapel, to serve as the Apostolic Exarchate's cathedral church - the Ukrainian Catholic Cathedral of the Holy Family in Exile in London.

After Ukrainian independence in 1991 emigrants have been attracted to prosperous western countries, principally those with qualifying skills, with a close inter-relation (such as intermarriage) and qualifying political asylum seekers entitled to refugee status, such as in the mid-2010s war, which have included Ukrainian Catholics.

=== Eparchy ===
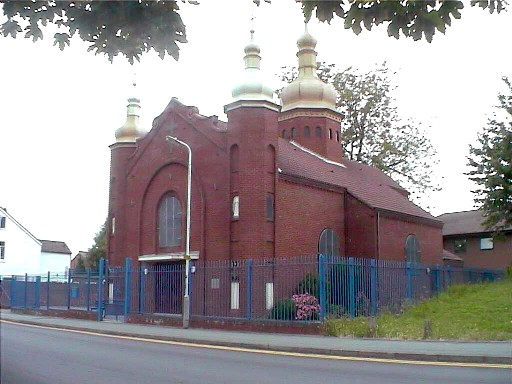
Church of Saints Volodymyr and Olha, Wolverhampton, West Midlands

On 18 January 2013 the Exarchate was elevated in the rank of the Eparchy (full bishopric) by Pope Benedict XVI.

The Ukrainian Catholic church in Wolverhampton was included as part of a video series by English Heritage on faith buildings in England.

On 9 June 2023, the Ukrainian Catholic Eparchy of the Holy Family in London, according to the decree of Bishop Kenneth, switches from 1 September 2023 to the Gregorian calendar, in particular with Easter.

== Statistics ==
The number of faithful in the Eparchy (diocese) numbers 10,000. There are 12 parishes regularly served, 14 diocesan priests, 3 religious priests, 3 male religious and 3 female religious.

== Charitable status ==
The Eparchy (formerly Apostolic Exarchate) for Ukrainian Catholics in Great Britain is a registered charity with the Charity Commission in England and Wales, under charity number 240088. It was first registered as a charity on 9 July 1965. Its stated aim is 'the advancement of religion at discretion of the bishop and his successors in title or the head of the Ukrainian Catholic Church in Great Britain'.

== Division over views on a Kyiv Patriarchate ==
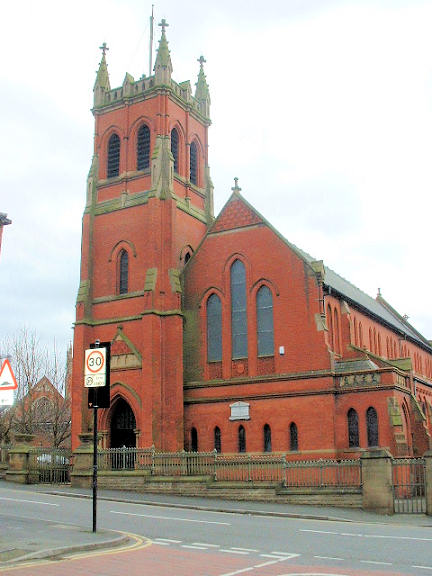
Church of SS Mary and James, Oldham, Greater Manchester

There has, for a long time, been different views among Ukrainian Catholics on the idea of a Kyiv Patriarchate, replacing the Major Archdiocese.

Hornyak was the first apostolic exarch, was known to have sided with those who did not believe that it would be appropriate for the Major Archbishop of the Ukrainian Catholic Church – who was then Cardinal Josyf Slipyj – to be commemorated as Patriarch until the Pope would agree to elevate the Major Archdiocese to a Patriarchate.

Since most of the faithful in the Apostolic Exarchate were patriotic and nationalist veterans of the Ukrainian Army, which was created in resistance to the German occupational forces, most supported the idea of a Patriarchate. They were therefore disappointed by the Bishop Hornyak's decision. Many showed their opposition through withholding their donations to the Church. A few Ukrainian Catholic priests came from Rome and began to celebrate Divine Liturgy privately in the faithful's homes commemorating the Major Archbishop as Patriarch – an act which angered Bishop Hornyak.

However, some people chose even more extreme methods of expressing their disagreement with Bishop Hornyak. For example, on 18 December 1977, when Bishop Hornyak went to Gloucester to open the new Ukrainian Catholic church, he was met by around 500 demonstrators who ignored the police cordon line and attacked him, bruising his face and crushing his glasses. This forced him to retreat back into his car.

Stephen Sulyk, Archbishop Metropolitan Emeritus for Ukrainian Catholics in Philadelphia, wrote in his autobiography, I Am With You Always, that Bishop Hornyak was eventually forced into retirement due to pressure from the Patriarchal Organization – which advocated a Kyiv Patriarchate – and the Major Archbishop of Lviv, Cardinal Myroslav Lubachivsky (Sulyk's predecessor) unfairly due to his backing of Vatican policies. However, many supporting the creation of a Kyiv Patriarchate viewed Bishop Hornyak's retirement as a good sign.

== Bishops ==
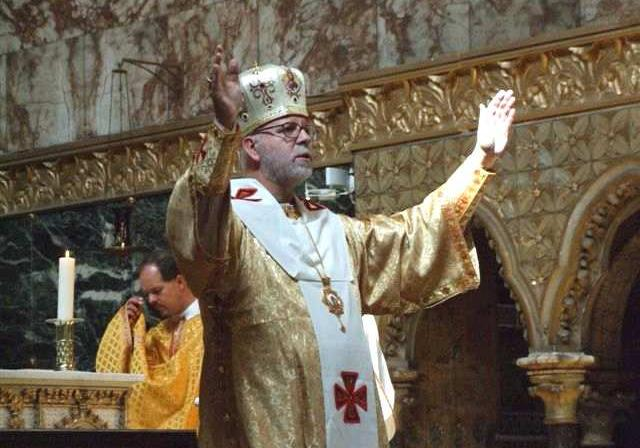
Former apostolic exarch Paul Patrick Chomnycky celebrating Divine Liturgy at Farm Street Catholic Church, London to the regular cathedral congregation, on 26 August 2007, after the roof of the Ukrainian Catholic Cathedral of the Holy Family in Exile collapsed.

When the Apostolic Exarchate for Ukrainians in England and Wales was first established in 1957, it was administered by the then Archbishop of Westminster, Cardinal William Godfrey. Bishop Augustine Hornyak was ordained as auxiliary bishop in 1961. Upon the death of Cardinal Godfrey in 1963, Augustine Hornyak was elevated to Apostolic Exarch for Ukrainians in England and Wales. In 1968, with the enlargement of the Apostolic Exarchate to include Scotland as well, Bishop Hornyak became the first Apostolic Exarch for Ukrainians in Great Britain. He has been succeeded by two other bishops.

On 2 June 2009, Pope Benedict XVI named Bishop Hlib Lonchyna, M.S.U., who had been an auxiliary to Cardinal Lubomyr Husar in Kyiv-Halych, as Apostolic Administrator of Great Britain and Apostolic Visitor in Ireland, which for all intents and purposes made him the new ordinary. In 2011, he was appointed Apostolic Exarch, and with the elevation of the Exarchate to the status of an Eparchy, Lonchyna became her first eparchial bishop.

The incumbent eparch is Kenneth Nowakowski, who was appointed on 15 January 2020. He was enthroned on 21 March 2020; owing to the COVID-19 pandemic, attendance was limited, and the local Latin Ordinary, Cardinal Vincent Nichols, presided in place of the Major Archbishop. In July 2022, Pope Francis appointed Nowakowski to serve concurrently as Apostolic Visitator for the Greek Catholic Ukrainians in Ireland.

Apostolic Exarchs for Ukrainians in Great Britain
From	Until	Incumbent	Notes
1957	1963	William Godfrey (Apostolic administrator)	Archbishop of Westminster (1956–1963)
1963	1987	Augustine Hornyak, O.S.B.M.	Formerly auxiliary bishop of the Exarchate (1961–1963)
1987	1989	Michael Hrynchyshyn, C.S.S.R. (Apostolic administrator)	Apostolic Exarch of France, Benelux and Switzerland (1982–2012)
1989	2002	Michael Kuchmiak, C.S.S.R.	Formerly auxiliary bishop of Philadelphia (1988–1989)
2002	2006	Paul Patrick Chomnycky, O.S.B.M.	Subsequently Eparch of Stamford (2006–present)
2011	2013	Hlib Lonchyna, M.S.U.	Formerly auxiliary bishop of Kyiv-Halyč (2004–09) and of Lviv (2002–04). Became the first eparchial Bishop of the Eparchy of Holy Family of London.

Eparchial bishops of the Eparchy of Holy Family of London
From	Until	Incumbent	Notes
2013	2019	Hlib Lonchyna, M.S.U.	Served previously as Apostolic Exarch for Ukrainians in Great Britain
2020	present	Kenneth Nowakowski	Was Bishop of New Westminster (Ukrainian), Canada, 2007-2020

== Cathedral church ==
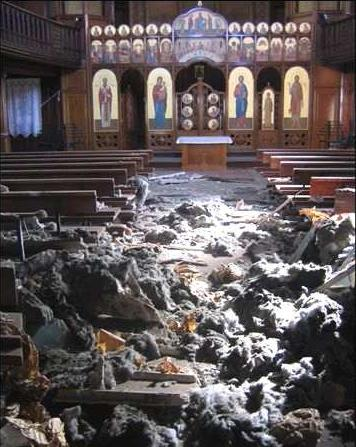
Collapsed roof of the Ukrainian Catholic Cathedral of the Holy Family in Exile, London

Named for the Holy Family, the cathedral was established in 1967 in an 1890 Alfred Waterhouse building. The edifice was the third home of an independent church founded in the 17th century, the King's Weigh House congregationalists, which dissolved after terminal decline in 1966. The cathedral is the seat of the Eparch (bishop) and is in Mayfair, London. It has a regular congregation of around 3000. Clerics are eparchial secular priests.

== See also ==
- Ukrainian migration to the United Kingdom
- Catholic Church in England and Wales
- Catholic Church

== Bibliography ==
- Hebblethwaite, Peter (1986). Inside the Vatican. London: Sidgwick & Jackson.
- Kaye, Elaine (1968). The King's Weigh House Church. London: George Allen and Unwin. LCCN 68120376. OCLC 464624.
- Stephens, WB, ed. (1969). "The City of Coventry: Roman Catholicism". A History of the County of Warwick. Victoria County History. Vol. 8, the City of Coventry and Borough of Warwick. London: Oxford University Press for the University of London Institute of Historical Research. pp. 368–371.
- Sulyk, Stephen (2004). I Am Always With You. Pleasant Word. ISBN 978-1414100623.
