= Belarusian Orthodox Eparchy of Turov and Pinsk =

Orthodox ecclesiastical administrative unit in Belarus

Eparchy of Turov and Pinsk
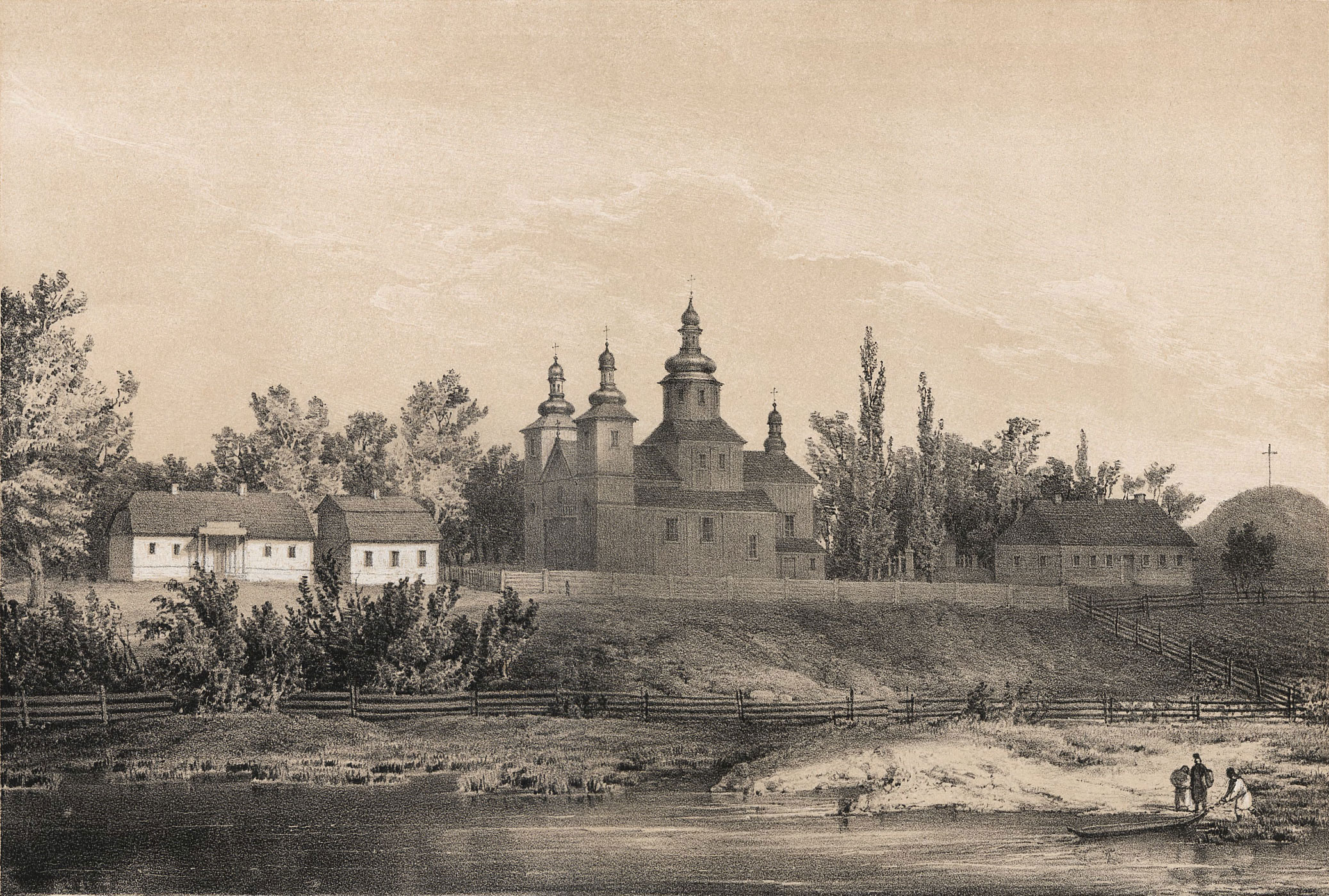
- Leszcze Monastery

Location
- Country: Belarus
- Headquarters: Turov, later Pinsk

Statistics
- Churches: Dormition of the Mother of God Church in Pinsk

Information
- Denomination: Eastern Orthodoxy
- Established: around 1088
- Dissolved: 1596 (conversion to the Uniate Church)

Leadership
- Parent church: Ecumenical Patriarchate of Constantinople
- Bishop: Jonah Gogol (last)

The Belarusian Orthodox Eparchy of Turov and Pinsk was an Orthodox ecclesiastical administrative unit based in Turov and later in Pinsk, under the jurisdiction of the Metropolis of Kyiv. It operated from the 11th century until 1596, when it transitioned to the Uniate Church by the decision of its ordinary, Bishop Jonah. Although the majority of the clergy and laity of the eparchy at that time favored remaining under the jurisdiction of the Ecumenical Patriarchate of Constantinople, the administrative unit never returned to the Orthodox Church. Formally, the Turov Eparchy was not abolished. In 1621, the Patriarch of Jerusalem, Theophanes III, illegally appointed Bishop Abraham of Stachona as the Bishop of Pinsk. However, in 1632, when the parallel existence of Orthodox and Uniate hierarchies was legalized in the Polish–Lithuanian Commonwealth, the Eparchy of Turov and Pinsk was not reactivated. Its former territory was not incorporated into the newly created Belarusian Eparchy (Mstsislaw, Mogilev, and Orsha). Instead, it was managed by the vicar of the Kyiv Metropolitan. New bishops of Turov and Pinsk were no longer appointed. The tradition of the Eparchy of Turov and Pinsk is continued by the post-Soviet administrative units of the Belarusian Orthodox Church: Eparchy of Turov and Mazyr and the Eparchy of Pinsk and Luninets.

Initially, the eparchy was closely associated with the Principality of Turov. In the 16th century, at the time of its actual dissolution, it encompassed the Pinsk District, the former Duchy of Dubrovytsia, the Bobryk and Vitsk estates, and the former Duchies of Turov and Horodok. The jurisdiction of the bishop of Turov and Pinsk was also recognized by some parishes located outside the described area but historically connected with the administrative unit. Sources confirm the existence of 188 parishes under the bishop of Turov and Pinsk during this period; the figure of 255 pastoral stations reported by some church historians is considered unlikely. The eparchy also had at least a dozen monasteries, the most significant being the Monastery of Saints Boris and Gleb in Turov in the early period, and later the Lauryshava Monastery and the Leszcze Monastery.

== History ==
=== Origins ===
According to many sources, auxiliary bishops of the Volodymyr eparchy resided in Turov from 1005. This is based on information contained in the tenth edition of the Kyiv Caves Patericon, compiled by Joseph, archimandrite of the Kyiv Monastery of the Caves, between 1647 and 1656. The Patericon mentions the appointment of the first Bishop of Turov, Thomas, in 6513 (i.e., 1005), and elsewhere it refers to his receipt of tithes from the entire Principality of Turov. Earlier editions of the Patericon, created between the 13th and 16th centuries, do not contain similar information.

Some Belarusian authors (Zagorulski, Łysienko) and the Orthodox Metropolitan and church historian, Macarius Bulgakov, claimed that auxiliary bishops of the Volodymyr eparchy, using the title of bishops of Turov, resided there as early as 992, or that an independent Turov eparchy was established in that year. If this date is accepted, it would mean that this bishopric was one of the oldest Christian administrative units in the Rus' lands, alongside the eparchies of Novgorod, Chernihiv, Rostov, Belgorod, Volodymyr, Polotsk, and Tmutarakan. The source for this view is a passage in the Primary Chronicle, which describes Sviatopolk I of Kiev assuming power in the Principality of Turov. Some Russian authors (Golubinsky, Yermalovich, Malyshevsky) also lean towards the belief that the first bishop arrived in Turov with Prince Sviatopolk, and the Turov eparchy was established in 991 or 992.

In Antoni Mironowicz's opinion, the view that the Turov eparchy was established as early as the 10th century, although widely spread in church tradition, is unreliable. He argues that attributing such a long history to the administrative unit is a late medieval legend. According to him, it is possible that a bishop resided in Turov to organize missionary activities around the town. Marceli Kosman also argues that the idea of the creation of the Turov eparchy lacks foundation, especially considering Turov's low status, which by the end of the 10th century was less significant than Pinsk.

According to Mironowicz, the independent Turov eparchy was established no earlier than 1088, when Sviatopolk II of Kiev became the duke of Turov, whose importance had significantly increased in the previous decade. The concept of dividing the Volodymyr eparchy and creating new administrative units was supported by the Kyiv Metropolitan John II. Political reasons were much more significant than purely ecclesiastical ones in the establishment of the administrative unit. This view is shared by Andrzej Poppe, Marceli Kosman, and Piotr Chomik.

=== Functioning in the Principality of Turov ===
The boundaries of the eparchy aligned with those of the Principality of Turov. In later centuries, it temporarily included some regions of Black Ruthenia and southern Podlachia. Poppe indicated that the eparchy's territory encompassed Polesia, including Brest and Pinsk. This area was defined by the rivers Pripyat, Pina, Yaselda, Sluch, Lan, Bobryk, Tsna, Stokhod, Styr, Lva, Stsviha, Uborca, and Horyn. The Turov eparchy was part of the Metropolis of Kyiv.

The eparchy's boundaries frequently changed due to conflicts between Rus' dukes and shifting borders between principalities. It is unclear when the final stable borders of the administrative unit were established, particularly concerning the Volodymyr eparchy. This may have occurred in 1135, after Duke Iziaslav Mstislavich moved from Turov to Volodymyr. By the mid-12th century, the Volodymyr eparchy included parts of Volhynia west of the Horyn and Sluch rivers, parts of Polesia (including Slonim, Grodno, Volkovysk, Kobryn), and areas along the middle Bug river (including Mielnik, Bielsk, and Drohiczyn). In 1237, the territory of the Brest Principality transferred from the Turov eparchy to the Volodymyr eparchy. In the 12th and 13th centuries, Turov bishops might have temporarily overseen Orthodox churches in southern Podlachia.

Few details have survived about the situation of the Principality of Turov and the Turov eparchy in the 13th century. It is known that despite the division of the principality (with the emergence of the Brest and Pinsk principalities), the Turov eparchy maintained its original boundaries. Little is known about the administrative situation during the Tatar invasions. The exact time of moving its capital to Pinsk is also unclear. According to Bishop Stefan of Turov, this occurred in 1241, while other authors place it in the first half of the 14th century, in 1440, or even at the beginning of the 16th century. The Leszcze Monastery became the new seat of the Turov eparchy. The reason for this relocation was the increased importance of Pinsk and the city's greater security against Tatar attacks.

Around 1303, the Turov eparchy transitioned from the jurisdiction of the Metropolis of Kyiv to the newly established Metropolis of Halych, along with the Chełm, Volodymyr, Przemyśl, and Lutsk eparchies. After the Metropolis of Halych was dissolved in 1347, it became part of the Metropolis of Kyiv again. Bishops of the defunct Metropolis of Lithuania, dissolved in 1330, also claimed jurisdiction over the Turov eparchy. In 1353, after the reactivation of the Metropolis of Lithuania, the Turov bishopric was included, along with the Polotsk eparchy. Eighteen years later, it transferred back to the Metropolis of Halych when Patriarch Philotheus of Constantinople reactivated its structure. Since the Principality of Turov was within the Grand Duchy of Lithuania, the actual superiors of the Turov bishops were the Lithuanian Metropolitans.

=== From 15th to 16th century ===
In the second half of the 15th century, the territory of the Turov eparchy consisted of the lands of the Principality of Turov, the Principality of Horodok, the Principality of Pinsk, and the former Principality of Dubrovytsia. After the division of the Metropolis of Kyiv into the Kyiv and Moscow metropolises, the Turov eparchy remained under the jurisdiction of the former.

The eparchy experienced significant development in the second half of the 15th century and the first half of the 16th century due to the donations and grants from Prince Ivan Vasilievich Yaroslavovich and later his son Fyodor, who inherited the Principality of Pinsk through his marriage to Helena Olshanska. Fyodor, while founding additional Orthodox churches, decided on their construction without consulting the bishop. He likely aimed to make the lower clergy dependent solely on him. Concerned by this situation, Bishop Vasian I of Turov brought the matter to King Alexander Jagiellon, who prohibited the construction of churches without the bishop's consent and ordered existing ones to be placed under his control.

Fyodor Ivanovich died childless in 1519. King Sigismund I the Old granted Pinsk to Queen Bona, who managed the town and the former Principality of Pinsk as a starostwo (an administrative unit). In 1522, Sigismund I confirmed Alexander Jagiellon's privilege regarding the founding of churches in the eparchy. In the 16th century, the borders of the Eparchy of Turov and Pinsk were established. It included the Pinsk district, the former Principality of Dubrovytsia, and the Bobryk and Vitsk estates. In the latter half of the century, the eparchy also incorporated the former Principalities of Turov and Horodok. Some parishes outside this area but historically connected to the administrative unit also recognized the authority of the bishop of Turov and Pinsk.

Queen Bona ensured the integrity of her domain in Pinsk and took care of the clergy of all denominations. She did not allow magnates to interfere in the activities of the Turov eparchy.

In the mid-16th century, Orthodoxy was the dominant religion in the Polesia region.

=== Transition of the Eparchy to the Uniate Church ===
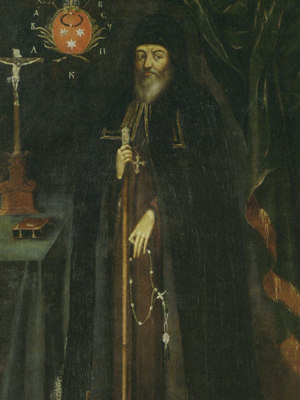
Archimandrite Yelysei Pletenetskyi was one of the leaders of the clergy's resistance against incorporating the eparchy into the Uniate Church, a move approved by Bishop Jonah Gogol

Bishop of Turov and Pinsk, Leontius (serving from 1588 to 1595), was a supporter of the union between the Orthodox Church in the Polish–Lithuanian Commonwealth and the Catholic Church. He attended the synods in Belz in spring and June 1590, and on 24 June 1594, together with bishops Cyril Terlecki, Hedeon Balaban, and Dionysius (Zbyruyskyy), he expressed his willingness to sign the union act. The faithful of the Turov eparchy were not informed about the activities of their ordinary. On 2 December 1594, Bishop Leontius participated in a meeting of Orthodox bishops with the Latin Bishop of Lutsk, Bernard Maciejowski, where they discussed the details of the upcoming union. In June 1595, the bishop once again confirmed his readiness to convert to Catholicism while retaining the Eastern rite. However, he never realized his plans as he died in an accident that same year.

Leontius' plans were realized by his successor, Bishop Jonah Gogol, who participated in the Union of Brest in 1596 and signed the union act. The council of dissenters excommunicated him for this reason. Most of the clergy of the eparchy strongly rejected the union. Participants in the anti-union council included the superior of the Leszcze Monastery near Pinsk, Yelysei Pletenetskyi, Pinsk protopopes Jan and Symeon, and the entire clergy of the Assumption of the Blessed Virgin Mary Cathedral in Pinsk. In subsequent years, almost all parishes and all monasteries rejected the union's provisions. The majority of the local nobility took a similar stance.

=== Attempts to reactivate the eparchy ===
In 1621, Patriarch Theophanes III of Jerusalem appointed Abraham of Stachona, a Greek, as Bishop of Pinsk. (Note: In 1620 and 1621, Theophanes ordained Orthodox bishops to all the cathedrals vacant after some of the rulers passed to the Uniate Church (Mironowicz (2008, pp. 18–19)).) This appointment was not confirmed by King Sigismund III Vasa, preventing Abraham from legally performing his duties. Despite this, with the help of the Orthodox nobility and townspeople of Polesia, Abraham managed to illegitimately oversee the eparchy until 1630, residing in the Leszcze Monastery. He regularly, though unsuccessfully, demanded the return of churches seized by the Uniates from the state authorities. It was only in 1630 that King Sigismund III Vasa summoned him before the royal court for performing the duties of a bishop without the necessary privilege and for overseeing numerous clergy.

In the Diploma issued in 1633, which restored the right of the Orthodox Church to operate alongside the Uniate Church in the Polish–Lithuanian Commonwealth, the Turov eparchy was not listed as one of its legal administrative units. Despite the fact that the Orthodox Turov eparchy had permanently become a Uniate administration, the Kyiv Metropolitans did not formally accept its closure. The area of the former Turov eparchy was not incorporated into the newly established Belarusian Eparchy of Mogilev and Mstsislaw in 1632 but was treated as a separate unit managed by the metropolitan's vicar. This role was usually held by the superior of the Holy Trinity Monastery in Slutsk or the protopope of Slutsk and Kopyl. Even in the mid-17th century, Orthodox parishes established on private estates in the mentioned area were three times more numerous than Uniate ones. New monasteries were also being founded. The position of Orthodoxy remained strong in the territory of the former Eparchy of Turov and Pinsk until the end of the Polish–Lithuanian Commonwealth.

=== Ordinaries of the eparchy ===
The first bishop of Turov was most likely the monk Thomas from the Kyiv Monastery of the Caves. Subsequent hierarchs – Simon, Joachim, and George – are mentioned in the hagiographic Word about Monk Martin. However, more detailed information has survived only about the activities of Joachim. He was of Rus origin and politically involved on the side of Duke Vyacheslav of Turov against Duke Iziaslav Mstislavich of Kyiv. He was removed from office simultaneously with Metropolitan Kliment Smoliatich, who was also of Rus origin. In 1157, he was replaced by Bishop George, a supporter of Greeks occupying the cathedrals. After him, from 1158 to 1182, the office was held by Kirill, a distinguished preacher, theologian, and religious poet, who was recognized as a saint by his successor, Laurentius. He served as Bishop of Turov for at least two years, though written sources do not specify the date of his death or departure from office.

The next reliable information about the bishops of Turov comes only from 1390. From the period of the Tatar invasions of Turov's land, only two different lists of bishops from the synodics of the Oldzewiecki church have survived. However, it is not certain whether these names belong to the local ordinaries. The first list mentions bishops Jonah, Basil, Daniel, Timothy, Dmitry, Simon, Peter, Cyprian, Theodosius, Arsenius, Dionysius, Ephraim, Jonah, Isaac, Theodosius, Alexius, Joachim, Ephraim, Vassian, Arsenius, Ephraim, Simon, Tikhon, Simon, Stephen, and Theodosius. The second list includes the names of bishops Basil, Daniel, Timothy, Peter, Dmitry, Dionysius, Ephraim, Cyprian, Cyprian, Nason, Isaac, Alexius, Ephraim, Tikhon, and Jonah. The differences between the two lists may be due to the inclusion in the first list of some names of the Kyiv metropolitans, which in turn could be a consequence of vacancies on the Turov see in some years. The next hierarch who undoubtedly served as Bishop of Turov was Theodosius, mentioned in 1390. He ceased to hold office before 1405, as in that year, during the visitation of Metropolitan Photius in Turov, the Turov bishop was already Antoni. Another known bishop of Turov was Euthymius, consecrated in 1412 in Lutsk by Metropolitan Photius. Euthymius ended his office in 1415.

In the 16th century, the office of Bishop of Turov-Pinsk was successively held by: Vassian I (1495–1509), Arsenius (1509–1514), Jonah (1514–1522), Macarius II (1522–1528), Tikhon (1528–1538), Vassian II (1538–1544), Barlaam (1544–1549), Vassian III, Macarius II (1552–1558), Jonah Protasevich-Ostrowski (1558–1568), Macarius Jewlashevsky (1568–1576), Cyril Terlecki (1576–1585), Leontius Pełczycki (1585–1595), and Jonah Gogol (until 1596).

Queen Bona significantly influenced the nominations to the episcopal see from 1519 onwards. She also had an impact on the appointments of parsons and monastery superiors.

== Assets of the eparchy ==
Detailed information about the endowment of the Eparchy of Turov begins during the reign of Grand Duke Vytautas of Lithuania. Due to his grants to the administration, he is often referred to as the founder of the bishopric in later documents. Vytautas issued privileges to the bishops of Turov, allowing them to collect tithes, fees from measures and weights, revenues from honey sales, and taxes from taverns and court cases. The Eparchy of Turov also owned one-third of the territory of Turov, including forests and lakes. Casimir IV Jagiellon confirmed the eparchy's rights to all this property.

Throughout the 15th century, some churches within the eparchy were endowed by the dukes of Horodec. Notably, Duke Ivan Vasilievich Yaroslavich, in the second half of the 15th century, granted the Bishop of Pinsk the right to collect customs duties from the town of Pinsk and provided a steady income for the "cathedral church". Ivan's generous donations to the eparchy led some sources to mistakenly describe him as the founder of the administration. During the same period, between 1488 and 1496, there was a conflict between the owner of the Pinsk estates, Maria Olelkovich, and the ordinary of the Eparchy of Turov and Pinsk over a tribute imposed by the duchess on episcopal estates.

In 1511, Konstanty Ostrogski donated an orchard, fields, and meadows to the Church of the Transfiguration in Turov, which was directly managed by the Bishop of Turov. These endowments were later the subject of long-standing disputes between the bishops of Turov and the Ostrogski family. In 1520, the eparchy received, through private donations, four villages with inhabitants – Olhomel, Radziwilowicze, Simonowicze, and Wilcze – a tavern, and townspeople in Zajatelu, one-tenth of the income from mills in Turov, orchards with apiaries, and a honey tribute from six additional villages. The donors of these endowments were Konstanty Ostrogski, his wife Tatiana, and their son Ilia. Between 1523 and 1524, Queen Bona confirmed all the grants and privileges given by previous owners of the Pinsk Principality to individual churches, although she reduced the endowment of the bishop of Turov and Pinsk.

Another document confirming the endowment of the administration comes from 1631 (from the period when the Turov bishopric had already passed to the Uniate Church) and lists the same assets accumulated over the centuries, except for the village of Wilcze. This village was unlawfully seized by Nicholas and Jan Radziwill before 1539. Despite King Sigismund I the Old's appeal for its return to its rightful owners, the eparchy never recovered it. The bishops of Turov were also in conflict with Duchess Alexandra Ostrogska, who repeatedly seized part of the administration's revenues or looted properties donated to the eparchy by her late husband, Konstanty.

Conflicts between the Turov bishops and the nobility, who were plundering the eparchy's assets (particularly with the Ostrogski and Dubrovitski dukes), persisted throughout the 16th century. The eparchy was also in conflict with the Pinsk starosta Stanisław Falczewski, who appropriated the market tax from the subjects of the Pinsk bishops, and in 1563 with the Ryczew lessee Bohdan Sołomerecki, who occupied lands of the episcopal estate in Ryczev. Disputes over church assets gradually intensified, and during the tenure of Bishop Cyril Terlecki of Pinsk, they were almost continuous. The bishop not only engaged in legal battles over individual lands but also conducted raids on the estates of his adversaries.

== Monastic life in the eparchy ==
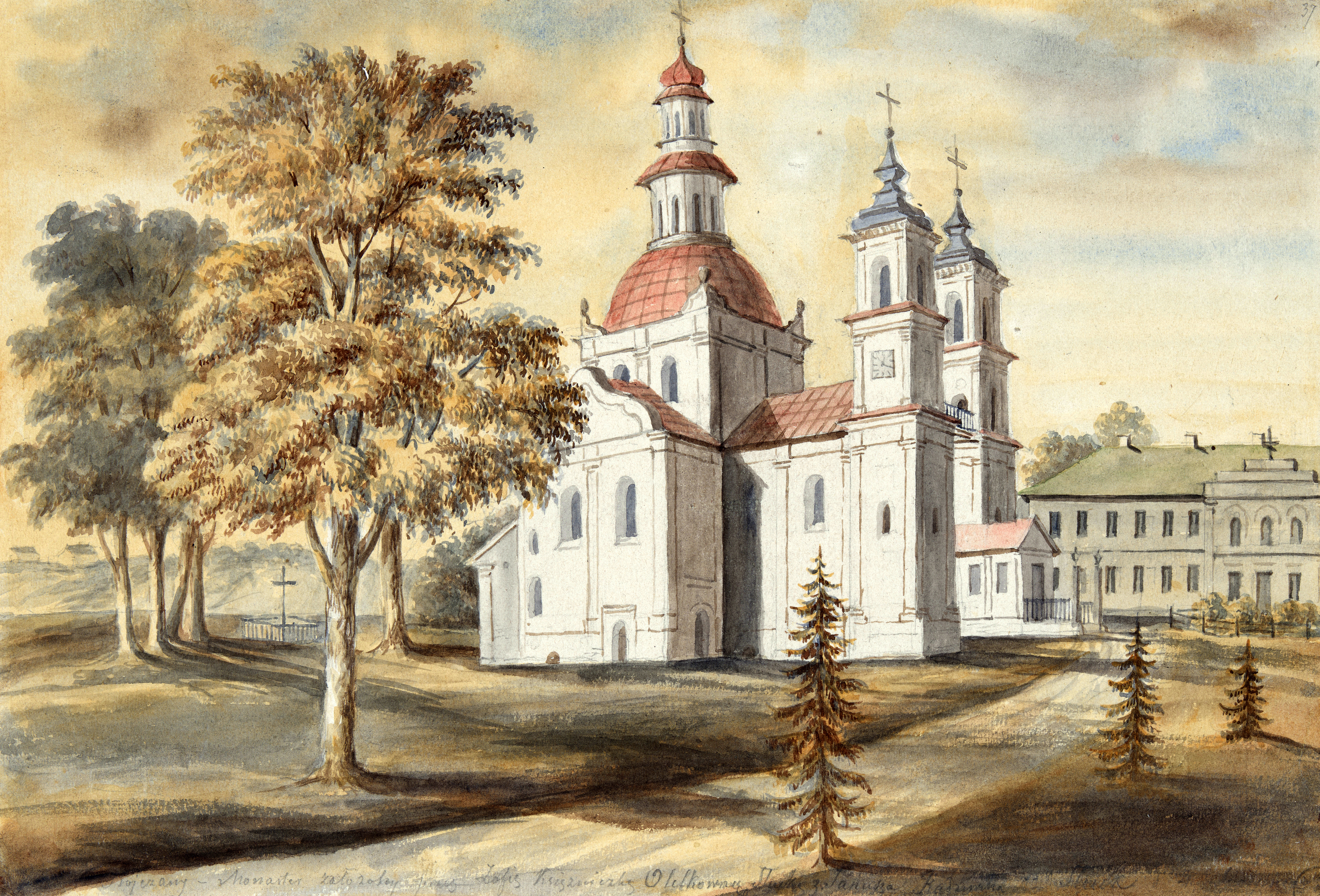
Monastery of the Holy Trinity in Sluck

The first monastery in the Eparchy of Turov was the Monastery of Saints Boris and Gleb, established around the mid-12th century. In the same century, thanks to the activity of the bishops of Turov, other monastic centers were established within their jurisdiction. Around the mid-12th century, a male Monastery of St. Nicholas also existed in Turov. Additionally, there was a short-lived female Monastery of St. Barbara in Turov, which was created and destroyed within the 12th century. Possible separate monasteries may have also been founded in Starazhovtsy (south of Turov) and Czernicze, within the city's limits, functioning only in the 12th and 13th centuries.

Before 1142, two monasteries were established in Mozyr – the male Monastery of Saints Peter and Paul and the female Monastery of St. Paraskieva. Some researchers suggest that the Monastery of the Entry of the Mother of God into the Temple in Kupiatycze was founded as early as 1182 at the site of the miraculous appearance of the Kupiatycze Icon of the Mother of God, according to church tradition. (Note: Some authors claim that the Kupiatycze monastery was not established until 1629, and that its founders, the Kopts, did not thus reactivate the older monastic center, but only created a new monastery in a place known for the cult of the miraculous icon.) The Monastery of the Holy Trinity in Sluck was founded no later than around 1205, possibly even in the 11th century. Its superiors were approved by the metropolitans of Kyiv, so it was not entirely under the jurisdiction of the bishops of Turov. (Note: Another source moves the time of the Slutsk monastery's establishment as late as the 15th century (Mironowicz (2011, pp. 260–261)).)

In the 13th century, the Lauryshava Monastery and the Leszcze Monastery (Note: Regarding this monastery, there are also sources dating its establishment to the 11th century, back in the lifetime of Vladimir the Great (Mironowicz (2011, pp. 261–262)).) (both male) were established. In the following century, the Monastery of Saints Boris and Gleb in Novogrudok was founded near the church of the same name. According to church tradition, the Monastery of the Assumption of the Mother of God in Nowy Dwór was also founded in the 13th century by the future Metropolitan of Kyiv, Peter. The monastery ceased operations in the 15th century and was reopened in 1618 through the endowment of Grzegorz Wołodkowicz.

Several new monasteries were established in the 15th century, including the Monastery of the Assumption of the Mother of God in Moroczy, the Monastery of St. Nicholas on Holszańska Hill, the Monastery of St. Simeon Stylites in Brest, the Monastery of the Transfiguration of the Lord in Kobryń (all male), and the female Monastery of St. Elias in Sluck. The founding date of the Monastery of St. George in Mozyr is unknown, but it existed before the 15th century. By 1505, the Monastery of St. Michael the Archangel in Stepan was established. Some authors associated with the Russian Orthodox Church claim that there were as many as 49 monasteries in the Eparchy of Turov and Pinsk in the 15th century, although this number is highly improbable. The most significant among them were the Monasteries of Saints Boris and Gleb and St. Barbara in Turov, the Lauryshava Monastery, the Monastery of St. George in Mozyr, and the Leszcze Monastery.

Scant information survives about the Hoholice Hermitage, a monastery near Pyetrykaw, funded by the Chodkiewicz family (or, according to another source, the Sluck Olelkovich family). It was a center of eremitic life, featuring caves. Similarly, limited data exists on the monastery in Zdzitów of unknown dedication.

In the 16th century, three monasteries operated in Pinsk: the male Leszcze Monastery, the female Monastery of St. Barbara, and the male Monastery of the Theophany, which was cared for by the local Orthodox brotherhood. The latter was founded at the end of the century and gained significance only after the Leszcze Monastery accepted the union. At the beginning of the century, Duke Fiodor Jarosławowicz founded a male monastery in the wilderness near Nobel. The third monastic community in Sluck, the Monastery of the Transfiguration of the Lord, was also established in the 16th century. In 1560, Duke Konstanty Ostrogski founded the Monastery of the Transfiguration of the Lord in Dziatłowicze. Before 1555, the male Monastery of St. Paraskieva in Kleck was established.

== Administrative division ==
Like all eparchies established in Kievan Rus, the Eparchy of Turov was initially divided into deaneries (also known as protopopies; equivalent to later deaneries) at the time of its creation. Each deanery was managed by a protopope, who was supported in daily duties by presbyters forming the kliros.

Initially, there was no bishop's kliros functioning alongside the eparchial bishop. The duties of the kliros were carried out by councils of the clergy, convened by the bishop. Over time, lay delegates also gained the right to participate in these councils. As the network of parishes expanded, the number of clergy increased to the point where the participation of all in the councils became impossible. Consequently, the councils were no longer convened, and instead, two bishop's kliros were established at the cathedrals in Turov and Pinsk. All clergy active in these cities had the right to participate in their work. Starting from the 13th century, the kliros performed not only administrative functions but also judicial ones. Members of the kliros were also candidates to administer the eparchy in the event of a vacancy on the bishop's throne.

At the beginning of the 15th century, the Eparchy of Turov was divided into seven protopopies: Pinsk, Turov, Horodec, Pyetrykaw, Mazyr, Dubrowyca, and Stapan. The Mazyr protopopy was later incorporated into the Metropolis of Kyiv. In the second half of the 16th century, the eparchy consisted of twelve deaneries: Pinsk, Drohiczyn, Biezdziec, Lohiszyn, Lubieszów, Nobel, Pohosko, Stolin, Horodec (David-Haradok), Turov, Pyetrykaw, and Dąbrowica.

== Parish network ==
=== Outline of the history of the development of the parish network ===
The 12th century was a significant period for the development of the parish network within the Eparchy of Turov and Pinsk. Despite territorial losses due to changing political circumstances, the activities of the bishops of Turov, even more so than private endowments, facilitated the development of the eparchial structures. However, at the turn of the 12th and 13th centuries, this development was halted. By the early 15th century, the Eparchy of Turov and Pinsk had around 200 parish churches under its jurisdiction.

A notable influence on the development of the parish network was the granting of the Duchy of Pinsk to Princess Maria Gasztołd, the widow of Prince Semen Olelkovich, in 1471 by privilege of Casimir IV Jagiellon. The Olelkovich family was closely associated with the Orthodox Church and supported it on numerous occasions. Their foundations within the Eparchy of Turov and Pinsk included, among others, the Church of St. Demetrius in Pinsk and the church in Stawek. Semen Olelkovich and his son donated plots in Pinsk to the administration. After Maria's death in 1501, her son-in-law Fedor Ivanovich Jaroslavich inherited the Duchy of Pinsk. Thanks to his endowments to various parishes and clergy, the parish network of the Eparchy of Turov and Pinsk experienced its fastest growth in history. However, Fedor's actions also led to a conflict with Bishop Wassian, as Fedor made decisions about the construction of new churches and the appointment of clergy without consulting the bishop. Bishop Wassian complained to King Alexander Jagiellon, who confirmed the bishop's exclusive right to independently decide on internal matters of the administration. In 1522, Sigismund I the Old reaffirmed Alexander's edict, stating that only the Bishop of Turov could establish new churches and monasteries within the eparchy.

Determining the exact time of establishment for many pastoral centers in the eparchy and confirming their assets is often not possible.

=== Deaneries and parishes of the eparchy in the 16th Century ===
==== Pinsk deanery ====
===== In Pinsk =====
In the mid-16th century, there were sixteen parish churches in Pinsk. They were dedicated to St. Demetrius, the Nativity of the Mother of God, St. Athanasius, St. Barbara, the Resurrection of the Lord, St. Elijah, St. Stephen, St. Nicholas, St. Michael, the Descent of the Holy Spirit, St. Theodore, St. George, St. Simon, the Transfiguration of the Lord, St. Onuphrius, and the Holy Trinity. The Church of St. Demetrius had the status of a cathedral. Before 1513, this status was also granted to the Church of the Nativity of the Mother of God, and it was in this church that the Bishop of Pinsk conducted services in the 16th century. The establishment dates of these parishes and the construction dates of most of the churches are not definitively known; only indirectly, based on endowment records, can probable dates of their founding be indicated.

- St. George Church – 12th century
- St. Michael Church – likely 1482 or later
- St. Demetrius Church – established after 1502, burned down in 1555, rebuilt three years later
- Nativity of the Theotokos Cathedral – before 1513
- Resurrection of Christ Church (wooden) – before 1561
- St. Nicholas Church (stone) – around 1511
- St. Simeon Church (wooden) – before 1501
- St. Onuphrius Church (wooden) – before 1561
- St. Stephen Church (wooden) – before 1561
- St. Theodore Church (wooden) – before 1515
- Churches of St. Athanasius, Transfiguration of the Lord, Holy Trinity, St. Elijah – establishment dates unknown

===== Outside Pinsk =====
In the second half of the 16th century, the Pinsk deanery also included the following parishes:

- St. Nicholas in Połkotycze (established 1580)
- St. Paraskeva in Dubnowicze (before 1539)
- St. Paraskeva in Parochońsk (before 1512)
- Nativity of the Theotokos in Soszna (before 1500)
- Protection of the Theotokos in Pohost Zahorodny (before 1566)
- St. Paraskeva in Bostyń
- Saints Boris and Gleb in Łunin
- Saints Joachim and Anna in Stawek (1503)
- Unknown dedication in Nowy Dwór

==== Drahichyn deanery ====
The seat of this deanery was Dowieczorowicze, later renamed Drahichyn. The following parishes were part of the deanery (all established by the 16th century):

- Meeting of the Lord in Drahichyn (before 1452)
- Ascension of the Lord in Lachowicze (before 1492)
- Nativity of the Theotokos and St. Nicholas in Glinna (before 1551)
- Nativity of the Theotokos in Torokanie
- Protection of the Theotokos in Pinkowicze
- Holy Myrrh-Bearing Women in Braszewicze
- Exaltation of the Holy Cross in Varacevichy
- Transfiguration of the Lord in Popina
- Exaltation of the Holy Cross in Brodnica
- St. Nicholas in Gniewczyce
- Saints Peter and Paul in Mochre
- St. Michael in Odryżyn
- St. John the Baptist in Osowce
- St. Nicholas in Potapowicze
- Nativity of the Theotokos in Laskowicze

==== Bezdzież deanery ====
The seat of the deanery was Bezdzież. The following parishes were part of the deanery:

- Holy Trinity in Bezdzież (around 1409)
- Transfiguration of the Lord in Drużyłowicze (before 1450)
- St. Nicholas in Drużyłowicze (before 1555)
- St. Elijah in Dostojev (before 1445)
- Transfiguration of the Lord in Motal (by mid-16th century)
- An unknown church dedication in Motal (by mid-16th century)
- Ascension of the Lord in Moladava (15th century)
- St. Nicholas in Czemeryn (1567)
- Protection of the Theotokos in Chomsk
- St. Paraskeva in Opal
- St. Michael in Huta (Hutów)
- Nativity of the Theotokos and St. Nicholas in Zdzitow (by the 16th century)
- Unknown dedication in Sporov, Piaski, and Tyszkowicze (by the 16th century)

==== Lahishyn deanery ====
The seat of the deanery was Lahishyn. The establishment dates of most parishes, which existed by the 16th century, are not known, except for St. Paraskeva in Viada (known in the 15th century) and the Nativity of the Theotokos Church in Porzecze (by 1552). Other parishes included:

- Exaltation of the Holy Cross in Obrow
- Protection of the Theotokos in Ozarycze
- St. Paraskeva in Bobrowicze
- St. George in Malkowicze
- St. Michael in Chotynicze
- St. Nicholas in Stoszczany
- Holy Trinity in Terechany
- Exaltation of the Holy Cross in Święta Woda
- Protection of the Theotokos in Wygonoszcza
- Exaltation of the Holy Cross in Weleśnica
- An unknown dedication in Krahlewicze

==== Liubeshiv deanery ====
The seat of the deanery was Liubeshiv. The parishes included (the time of establishment of all the described churches is undetermined; it happened in the 16th century at the latest):

- Transfiguration of the Lord in Lubieszów
- Epiphany in Czerwiszcze
- Exaltation of the Holy Cross in Bychow
- St. Nicholas in Lubiaż
- St. Paraskeva in Lubiaż
- Protection of the Theotokos in Dolsk
- Ascension of the Lord in Uhrynicze
- Transfiguration of the Lord in Pniew
- Protection of the Theotokos in Drewko
- Unknown dedications in Horki and Buczyn (established by the 16th century)

==== Nobel deanery ====
The seat of the deanery was Nobel. The parishes included:

- St. Nicholas in Nobel (before 1557)
- Resurrection of Christ in Nobel
- Saints Peter and Paul in Nobel
- Transfiguration of the Lord in Nobel
- Saints Peter and Paul in Moroczna (early 16th century)
- Nativity of the Theotokos in Moroczna
- Exaltation of the Holy Cross in Łoknica (early 16th century)
- Nativity of the Theotokos in Chrapina
- St. Paraskeva in Kuchcze
- St. Nicholas in Sieńczyce
- St. Michael in Żydcze
- Transfiguration of the Lord in Newel
- Protection of the Theotokos in Żeleznica
- Holy Trinity in Wojnówka
- St. Michael in Pożog

==== Pohost deanery ====
The seat of the deanery was Pohost Zareczny. The parishes included:

- Dormition of the Theotokos in Pohost Zareczny (15th century)
- St. Stephen and Protection of the Theotokos in Pohost Zareczny
- Nativity of the Theotokos in Ostrów (before 1512)
- Transfiguration of the Lord in Żołkin (before 1548)
- St. George in Wołwicz
- St. Michael in Wiczówka
- St. Nicholas in Stary Konie
- Protection of the Theotokos in Niańkowicze
- Nativity of the Theotokos in Radczyck
- Holy Trinity in Horodne
- St. George in Swarycewicze
- St. Michael in Biały
- Protection of the Theotokos in Rzeczyce
- Nativity of the Theotokos in Morowina
- St. Demetrius in Serniki
- Unknown dedication in Worotycze (by the 15th century)
- Unknown dedication in Iwańczyce

==== Stolin deanery ====
The seat of the deanery was Stolin. The parishes included:

- Holy Trinity in Stolin (by the 16th century)
- Protection of the Theotokos in Stachów (before 1555)
- Protection of the Theotokos in Płotnica
- St. Michael in Markowicze
- St. Michael in Rubel (16th century)
- St. Nicholas in Stary Sioło
- Holy Trinity in Białohusza
- St. George in Ladce
- St. Michael in Widzibór
- St. Paraskeva in Berezne (16th century)
- Unknown dedication in Otwierzyce (16th century)

==== Davyd-Haradok deanery ====
The seat of the deanery was in Davyd-Haradok, and its administrative structure included the following parishes:

- St. Nicholas in Pierechodowicze (before the second half of the 15th century)
- St. Elijah in Horodets (1465)
- Sts. Peter and Paul in Kobryn (1465)
- St. Demetrius of Thessalonica in David-Gorodok (before the 16th century)
- St. George in David-Gorodok
- St. Michael the Archangel in Remel (15th century)
- St. Elijah in Wielemicze (before the 16th century)
- Resurrection of the Lord in Olszany (by 1555)
- St. Nicholas in Kożangródek
- Nativity of the Mother of God in Dubieniec
- Nativity of the Mother of God in Duboy
- St. George in Sienkiewicze
- Nativity of the Mother of God in Wilcze
- Holy Trinity in Sitnica
- St. George in Mokrow
- Nativity of the Mother of God in Łachwa
- Holy Trinity in Wiczyna
- Protection of the Mother of God in Ozarycze

==== Turov deanery ====
The seat of the deanery was in Turov. In the 16th century, it included the following parishes:

- Sts. Boris and Gleb in Turov (12th century)
- Transfiguration of the Lord in Turov (before 1508)
- Dormition of the Mother of God in Turov
- St. Elijah in Turov
- All Saints in Turov
- Transfiguration of the Lord and Protection of the Mother of God in Storożewice (before 1497)
- St. Stephen in Pohost
- Holy Trinity in Ozdamicze
- Protection of the Mother of God in Chrapina (no later than 1451)
- St. John the Theologian in Maleszew (before 1453)
- Transfiguration of the Lord in Daniłowice
- St. Michael in Ryczew
- St. Paraskeva in Simonowicze
- Holy Trinity in Lelczyce
- Nativity of the Mother of God in Glinna
- Resurrection of the Lord in Olhoml
- Resurrection of the Lord in Radziwiłowicze
- St. Nicholas in Tonież
- St. Nicholas in Borowa
- Nativity of the Mother of God in Miłoszewicze
- Nativity of the Mother of God in Bujnowicze
- Holy Trinity in Głuszkiewicze
- Exaltation of the Holy Cross in Wereśnica

==== Pyetrykaw deanery ====
The seat of the deanery was in Pyetrykaw. Before the Union of Brest, it included the following parishes:

- St. Nicholas in Pyetrykaw
- Protection of the Mother of God in Pyetrykaw
- Resurrection of the Lord in Pyetrykaw (existence uncertain, possibly ceased to exist before the 16th century or was not an independent parish by then)
- Ascension of the Lord in Laskowicze
- St. Nicholas in Laskowicze (both before 1541)
- Nativity of the Mother of God in Śniadyna (after 1395)
- St. Nicholas in Pererów
- Protection of the Mother of God in Ostrożanka
- Nativity of the Mother of God in Bałażewicze
- Holy Trinity in Żydkowicze
- St. Nicholas in Skryhałów

==== Dubrovytsia deanery ====
The deanery with its seat in Dubrovytsia included the following parishes:

- Nativity of the Mother of God in Dubrovytsia
- St. Nicholas in Dubrowica (both before the 14th century)
- Protection of the Mother of God in Strzelsko
- Nativity of the Mother of God in Biereżki
- Dormition of the Mother of God in Wysocko
- St. Michael in Ozier
- Parish in Wielkie Cepcewicze of unknown dedication

All parishes, except for Dubrovytsia, were foundations of the Holszański family and were established in the 14th or 15th century.

=== Turov and Pinsk as significant centers of Orthodox worship ===
The most important center of worship in the Eparchy of Turov ad Pinsk was Turov. Due to private foundations in the 12th century, it housed between a dozen and even forty churches, though not all had the status of parish churches (some were private household churches). The Dormition Cathedral in Turov, built in the mid-12th century and destroyed in 1230, was one of the largest churches in the entire Metropolis of Kyiv. Turov also hosted workshops for icon painting and the production of liturgical utensils.

In the 16th century, Pinsk had become the most important center of Orthodox worship in the eparchy. In Turov, only one of the two choirs and a governor (dean) resided. The Dormition Cathedral in Turov retained the honorary title of cathedral.

== Bibliography ==
- Mironowicz, Antoni (2011). Biskupstwo turowsko-pińskie w XI-XVI wieku (in Polish). Trans Humana. ISBN 978-83-61209-55-3.
- Mironowicz, Antoni (2008). Diecezja białoruska w XVII i XVIII wieku (in Polish). Wydawnictwo Uniwersytetu w Białymstoku. ISBN 978-83-7431-150-2.
- Tiepłowa, W. (2006). "Eparchia pińsko-turowska przed unią brzeską (XV-XVI)". Rocznik Instytutu Europy Środkowo-Wschodniej (in Polish). 4. Lublin.
