= List of rivers of Belarus =

This is a list of rivers in Belarus. All rivers measured in Kilometres. Inside of Belarus and the length in total.

== Longest rivers ==
Name	Total, km	In Belarus, km
Dnieper River	2145	690
Western Dvina	1020	328
Neman River	937	459
Bug River	831	169
Pripyat River	761	495
Sozh River	648	493
Berezina River	613	613
Vilija	510	276
Ptsich	421	421
Shchara	325	325
Svislach	297	297

== List of Rivers in Belarus ==
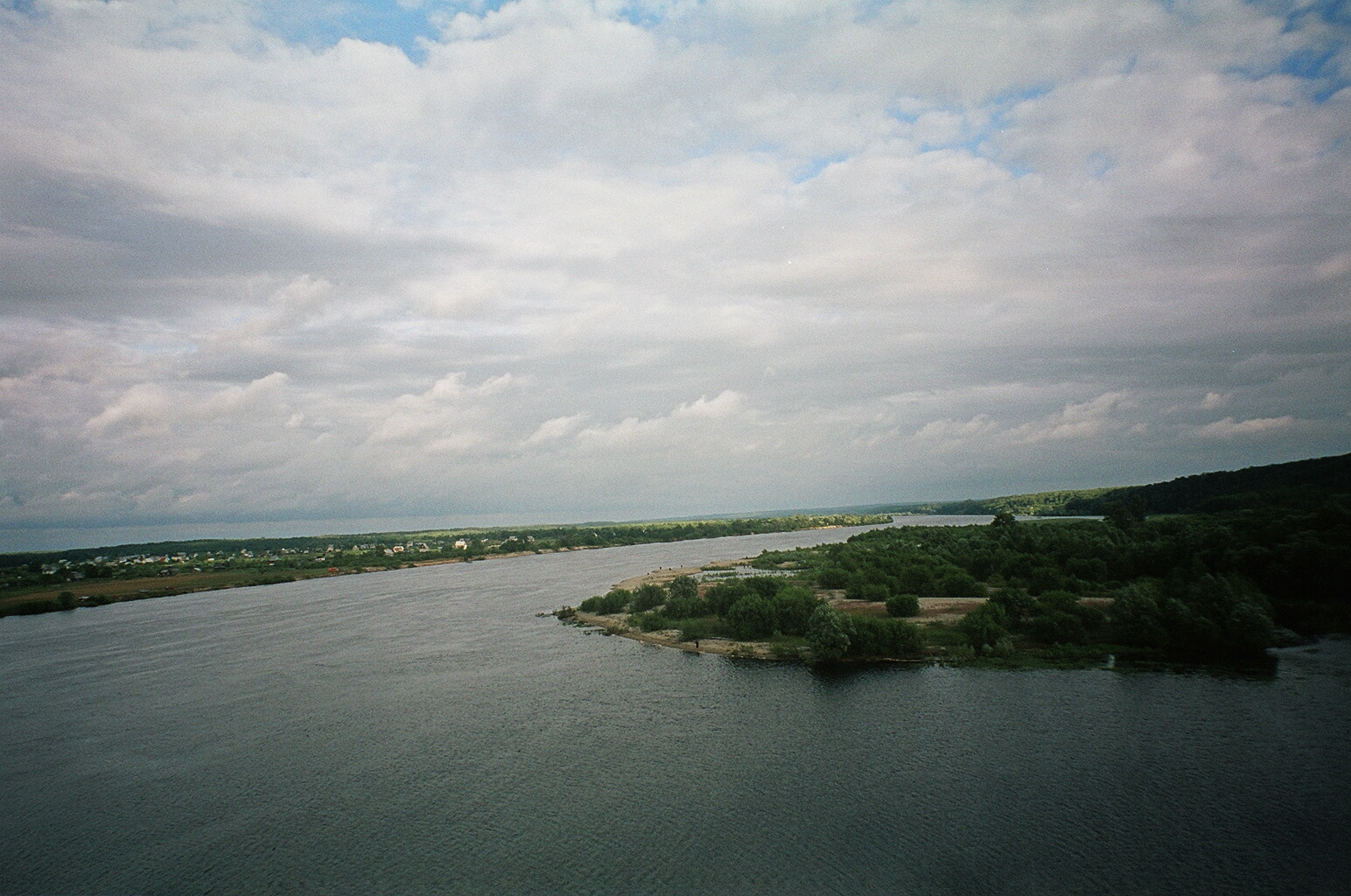
Pripyat River

- Dnieper River
  - Drut River (R)
  - Sozh River (L)
    - Iput River
    - Pronya
    - Besed
  - Berezina River (R)
    - Svislach
      - Niamiha River
    - Babrujka River
  - Pripyat River (R)
    - Braginka
    - Horyn River
    - Styr River
    - Ubarts
    - Ptsich
    - Sluch
    - Yaselda River
    - Stviha
- Neman River
  - Western Berezina
    - Disna
    - Drisa
    - Usa River
  - Shchara
  - Kotra River
  - Vilija
    - Vilnia River
    - Narač River
  - Merkys River
    - Ūla River
- Western Dvina
  - Pałata
  - Kasplya River
  - Dysna
- Bug River
  - Mukhavets River
    - Dachlovka
    - Zhabinka
    - Trascianica
    - Asipaǔka
    - Ryta
  - Lesnaya
  - Pulva

=== Minor ===
- Drahabuž River
- Lovat River
- Narew
