= Zdzitava =

Zdzitava Здзітава (Belarusian)
- Village
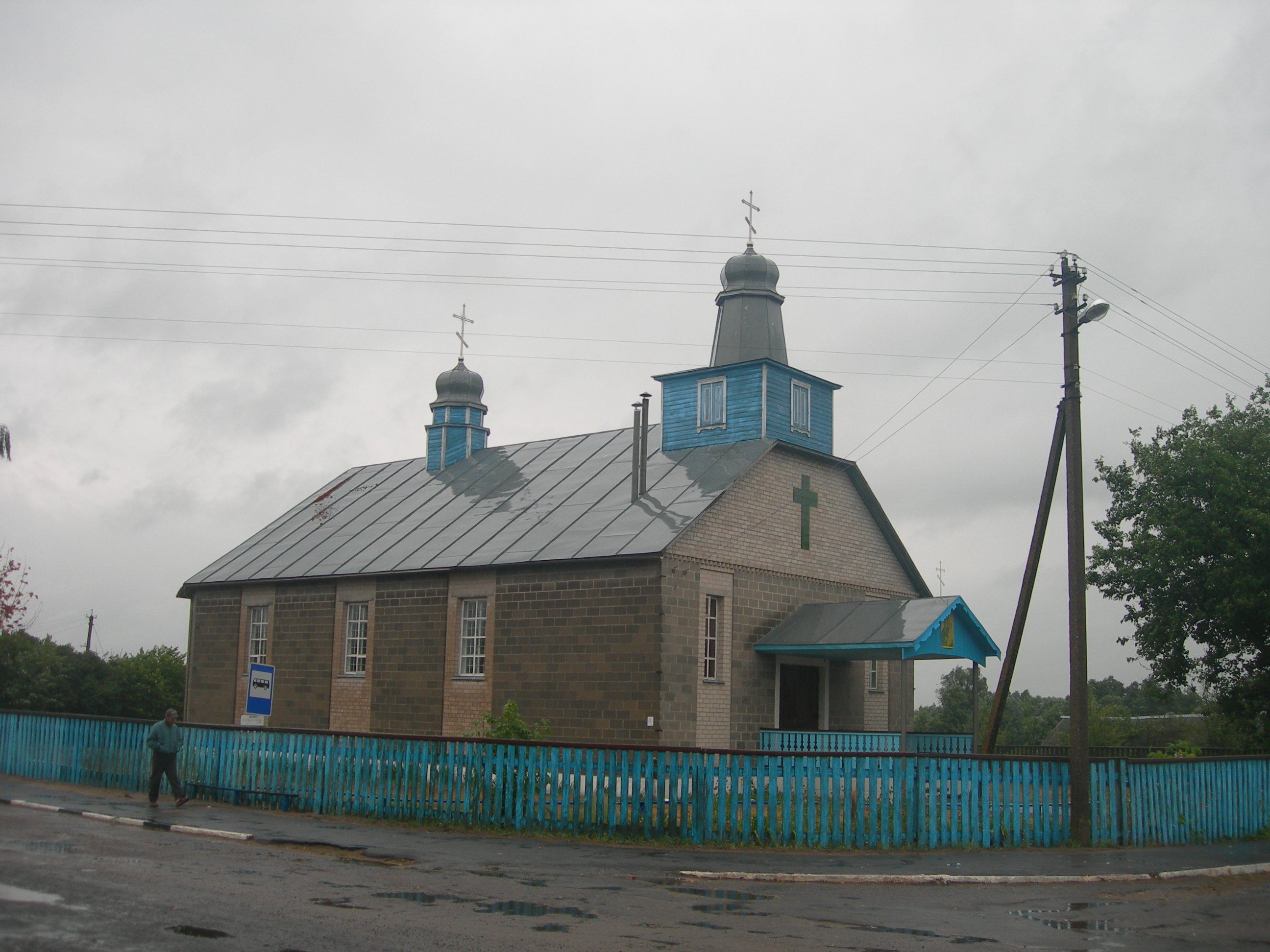

- Location within Belarus
- Coordinates: 52°25′N 25°15′E
- Country: Belarus
- Region: Brest Region
- District: Byaroza District
- Time zone: UTC+3 (MSK)

Zdzitava (Belarusian: Здзітава; Russian: Здитово, romanized: Zditovo) is a village in Byaroza District, Brest Region, Belarus. It is part of Sporava selsoviet. It is located between the Chornaye and Sporawskaye lakes on the Zhygulyanka River. It has a population of less than 1,000 people.

== History ==
First people appeared on this territory in the Neolithic age. Remains of ancient settlements were found to the north and east from the village. First written mention of the city of Zdzitaŭ (Zdzitow, Zditov) refers to the year 1005 and is related to establishment of the first Western rite diocese.

Until recent times the first known document mentioning Zdzitaŭ was the Hypatian Codex of 1252. The chronicle described a war between Volhynian dukes Danila and Vasilka against the Lithuanian duke Mindoŭh. The way from Volhynia to Lithuania laid through the fortresses Vietla on the Pripyat and Zdzitaw on Jasielda and further to Slonim and Navahrudak. The original city was located 7 km to the north of modern village, on the bank of the Jasielda river.

Zdzitaŭ was one of the 35 cities that existed on the territory of Belarus before 1300. Zdzitaŭ was a volost centre in the Duchy of Slonim. In the fourteenth century the town became part of the Grand Duchy of Lithuania. Approximately at this time it was destroyed, probably as a result of a military campaign of Kiev dukes against Yotvingians, and was rebuilt at the current place.

Before 1430 Zdzitaŭ was granted Magdeburg rights and was a local centre in the Slonim paviet and under direct ducal rule. In the time of the Polish–Lithuanian Commonwealth Zdzitaŭ lost its urban rights, became property of individual nobles and later transformed to a village.

During the World War II the region of Polesia became a centre of active partisan movement. At the beginning of 1944 Soviet partisans managed to liberate a certain territory far from the front line and defend it against surrounding German armies for 6 days.

== Places of interest ==
- Monument "The Defence of Zdzitava"
- A local church

== Sources ==
- Гарады і вёскі Беларусі: Энцыклапедыя, vol. 3, book 1 (ed. Аlyaksandr І. Lakota). Belen: 2006 ISBN 985110373X
- Энцыклапедыя гісторыі Беларусі (in 6 vols), vol. 3: Гімназіі — Кадэнцыя (ed. G. P. Pashkoy, E. E. Zhakevich). Belen: 1996 ISBN 9851100412
- Zdzitów (4) in Słownik geograficzny Królestwa Polskiego i innych krajów słowiańskich. Tom VII: Netrebka — Perepiat. Warszawa: 1886
