= Jonah Gogol =

Jonah Gogol (Polish: Jonasz Hohoł, Ukrainian: Iona Hohol, died in 1602) was an Orthodox and later an Uniate bishop of Pinsk-Turowski.

== Biography ==
Prior to 1594 Jonah Gogol was superior of the monastery of the Transfiguration in Kobryn with the dignity of archimandrite and nominated to be bishop of Pinsk-Turowski with law of succession to the Office of Bishop Leontius Pełczycki which occurred following year, when Bishop Leontius died in an accident. On 23 September 1595 Gogol was named and in October ordained Orthodox bishop. A strong supporter of the Union of the church since his appointment as bishop, on 19 October 1596 Gogol joined the Union of Brest, becoming a Greek-Catholic Bishop. Although it was before being excommunicated by opponents of the union council meeting in Brest, in parallel with the synod of the Union, the then de facto administered eparchy until his death. This Act of Union of Brest was signed in spite of strong opposition to it from the subordinate clergy. As a result of obedience to the bishop, Jonah had access not only most of the white clergy eparchy, but also the largest monasteries of the Orthodox Monastery of Leszno near Pinsk.
