= Zhygulyanka =

- Native name: Жыгулянка (Belarusian)

Location
- Country: Belarus

Physical characteristics
- Mouth: Yaselda
  - coordinates: 52.3956°N 25.2860°E

Basin features
- Progression: Yaselda→ Pripyat→ Dnieper→ Dnieper–Bug estuary→ Black Sea

The Zhygulyanka (Belarusian: Жыгулянка, also: Дарагабуж - Darahabuzh) is a river in Brest Region in south-west Belarus. It is a left tributary of the Yaselda. It flows through Chornaye Lake and the village of Zdzitava.
