= Union of Brest =

1596 transfer of religious jurisdiction

Religious situation in the Polish–Lithuanian Commonwealth in 1573

The Union of Brest (Note: (Belarusian: Берасцейская унія, romanized: Bieraściejskaja unija; Lithuanian: Bresto unija; Polish: Unia brzeska; Ukrainian: Берестейська унія, romanized: Berestejśka unija)) took place in 1595 and 1596 and represented an agreement by Eastern Orthodox churches in the Ruthenian portions of the Polish–Lithuanian Commonwealth to accept the Pope's authority while maintaining Eastern Orthodox liturgical practices, leading to the formation of the Ruthenian Uniate Church, which currently exists as the Ukrainian Greek Catholic Church and the Belarusian Greek Catholic Church.

== The union ==
=== Background ===
Rome-oriented Christians and their Byzantium-oriented counterparts formally severed connections from 1054. Subsequent attempts to unify Eastern Orthodox believers and the Catholic Churches were made on several occasions, including an instance in 1452 in which the deposed Metropolitan of Kiev, Isidore (in office from 1437 to 1441), endorsed the 1439 Union of Florence and formally promised the unity of the Ruthenian Orthodox Church with Rome.

In 1588–1589, the Patriarch of Constantinople, Jeremias II, traveled across Eastern Europe, particularly the Polish–Lithuanian Commonwealth and the Tsardom of Russia, where he finally recognized the Russian Orthodox Church in Moscow (estranged from Constantinople since the 1440s) and consecrated Patriarch Job of Moscow as the Eastern Orthodox All-Russian Patriarch (a dignity previously held by Isidore from 1437 to 1441). Patriarch Jeremias II deposed the Metropolitan of Kiev, Onesiphorus Divochka, and with the approval of the King of Poland, Sigismund III, consecrated Michael Rohoza as the new Metropolitan of Kiev, Halych, and all Rus'.

=== Negotiations ===
After Patriarch Jeremias II left Muscovy in 1589, four out of nine bishops of the Eastern Orthodox Church in the Ruthenian lands of the Polish–Lithuanian Commonwealth gathered in synod in the city of Brest. They signed a declaration of their readiness to reunite with Rome. The 33 articles of Union were accepted by Pope Sixtus V. At first widely successful, the Union lost some of its initial support within the following several decades, mainly due to its enforcement on the Orthodox parishes, which provoked several massive uprisings.

List of bishops who did not initially accept the union

- Metropolitan of Kiev and all Rus'
- Archeparch of Polotsk–Vitebsk
- Bishop of Smolensk
- Bishop of Volodymyr–Brest
- Bishop of Przemyśl-Sambir-Sanok (adopted the union in 1692)

List of bishops who in 1590 signed the declaration of intent

- Bishop of Luck and Ostrog — Kyrylo Terletskyi (exarch of Ecumenical Patriarch of Constantinople)
- Bishop of Pinsk and Turow — Leontiy Pelchytskyi
- Bishop of Chelm — Dionisiy Zbyruiskyi
- Bishop of Lviv — Hedeon Balaban

List of bishops who later joined the agreement

- Bishop of Przemysl — Mykhailo Kopystenskyi
- Archbishop of Polock — Herman Zahorskyj (acting)
- Bishop of Volodymyr-Brest — Hypatius Pociej
- Metropolitan of Kiev and all Rus' — Michael Rohoza

At the request of Prince Konstanty Wasyl Ostrogski, Hypatius Pociej left his post of Greater Castellan of Brześć Litewski and accepted the King's appointment to the eparchy of Volodymyr-Brest. Prince Konstanty Wasyl Ostrogski considered that the Metropolitan of Kyiv should reach an agreement with the eastern patriarchs, the Patriarch of Moscow, and Metropolis of Moldavia and Bukovina for joint participation in agreement with the Latin Church.

In 1595, both Hedeon Balaban and Mykhailo Kopystenskyi withdrew their signatures from the agreement. That same year the Archbishop of Polotsk, Nathaniel Sielitskyi, died, and was replaced with Herman Zahorksyi.

=== Proclamation ===
The union was solemnly and publicly proclaimed in the Hall of Constantine in the Vatican. Canon Eustachy Wołłowicz, of Vilnius, read in Ruthenian and in Latin the letter of the Ruthenian episcopate to the Pope, dated 12 June 1595. Cardinal Silvio Antoniani thanked the Ruthenian episcopate in the name of the Pope, and expressed his joy at the happy event. Then Hipacy Pociej, Bishop of Volodymyr, in his own name and that of the Ruthenian episcopate, read in Latin the formula of abjuration of the 1054 Greek Schism, Bishop Cyril Terlecki of Lutsk read it in Ruthenian, and they affixed their signatures. Pope Clement VIII then addressed to them an allocution, expressing his joy and promising the Ruthenians his support. A medal was struck to commemorate the event, with the inscription: Ruthenis receptis. On the same day the bull Magnus Dominus et laudabilis nimis was published, announcing to the Roman Catholic world for the first time that Ruthenians were in the unity of the Roman Church. The bull recites the events which led to the union, the arrival of Pociej and Terlecki at Rome, their abjuration, and the concession to the Ruthenians that they should retain their own rite, save for such customs as were opposed to the purity of Catholic doctrine and incompatible with the communion of the Roman Church. On 7 February 1596, Pope Clement VIII addressed to the Ruthenian episcopate the brief Benedictus sit Pastor ille bonus, enjoining the convocation of a synod in which the Ruthenian bishops were to recite the profession of the Catholic Faith. Various letters were also sent to the Polish king, princes, and magnates, exhorting them to receive the Ruthenians under their protection. Another bull, Decet Romanum pontificem, dated 23 February 1596, defined the rights of the Ruthenian episcopate and their relations in subjection to the Holy See.

=== Terms ===
It was agreed that the formulation filioque should not be inserted in Ruthenians' Nicene Creed. The bishops asked to be dispensed from the obligation of introducing the Gregorian Calendar, so as to avoid popular discontent and dissensions, and insisted that the king of Poland should grant them, as of right, the dignity of senators.

=== Outcomes ===
Religious situation in the Polish–Lithuanian Commonwealth in 1750

The union was strongly supported by the King of Poland and Grand Duke of Lithuania, Sigismund III Vasa, but opposed by some bishops and prominent nobles of Rus', and (perhaps most importantly) by the nascent Cossack movement for Ukrainian self-rule. The result was "Rus' fighting against Rus'", and the splitting of the Church of Rus' into Greek Catholic and Greek Orthodox jurisdictions. The greatest noble to oppose it was Konstanty Wasyl Ostrogski. In 1620, the Metropolis of Kiev, Galicia and all Ruthenia was erected under the care of the Patriarchate of Constantinople for dissenting Eastern Orthodox faithful. This resulted in parallel successions of metropolitans to the same ecclesiastical title in the territory of the Commonwealth.

== See also ==
- Union of Uzhhorod
- Synod of Polotsk
- Articles for the Reassurance of the Ruthenian people
- History of Christianity in Ukraine
- Jeremi Wiśniowiecki
- Eastern Catholic liturgy
- Theological differences between the Catholic Church and the Eastern Orthodox Church
- Ecclesiastical differences between the Catholic Church and the Eastern Orthodox Church
