= Slovechna =

River in Belarus and Ukraine

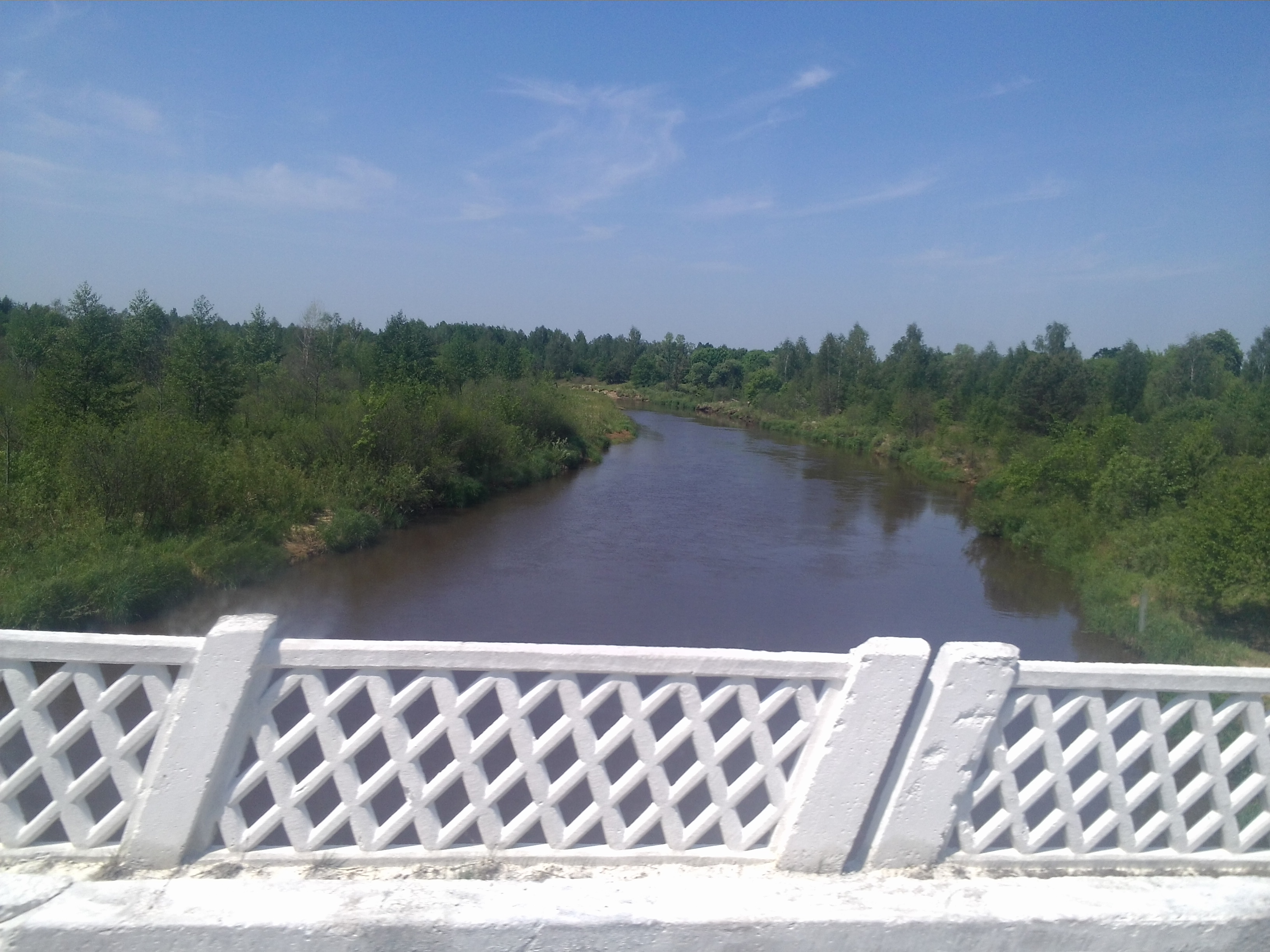

Location
- Countries: Belarus, Ukraine

Physical characteristics
- Mouth: Pripyat River
  - coordinates: 51.6698°N 29.6895°E
- Length: 158 km (98 mi)
- Basin size: 3,600 km^{2} (1,400 sq mi)

Basin features
- Progression: Pripyat→ Dnieper→ Dnieper–Bug estuary→ Black Sea

The Slovechna is a river in Zhytomyr Oblast, Ukraine and Gomel Region, Belarus. It is a right tributary of the Pripyat River. It is 158 kilometres (98 mi) long, and has a drainage basin of 3,600 square kilometres (1,400 sq mi).
