= Cyril Terlecki =

Eparch and supporter of the Union of Brest

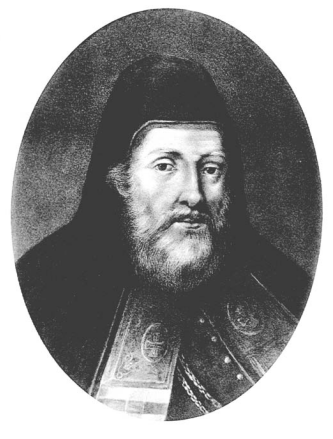

Signature

Bishop Cyril S. Terlecki (Ukrainian: Кирило Терлецький; Belarusian: Кірыла Цярлецкі; Polish: Cyryl Terlecki; died May 1607) was a religious and political figure and one of the initiators of the conclusion of the Union of Brest in 1596. He served as a bishop of the Eparchy of Lutsk–Ostroh as both an Eastern Orthodox and Ruthenian Uniate Church.

== Life ==
Cyril came from a noble family whose roots were out of Przemysl Land. The members of this family held high ecclesiastical positions in the first half of the 15th century. In the 1560s, he was the archpriest of the church of St. Dmitry in Pinsk. In 1572, the then-Bishop of Turov-Pinsk, Brest, Andrew Rusin, died. In 1575, Terlecki, who at that time was a widower and could accept monastic tonsure, began campaigning to become bishop of the Turov-Pinsk Diocese and, during the interregnum, received a diploma in the Turov-Pinsk diocese. Terlecki supported Prince Konstanty Wasyl Ostrogski, who had land holdings in Pinsk county. After becoming bishop, Terlecki demanded the rights and privileges of the clergy, collected documents from the historical past of his predecessor, and compiled the diocesan archives. Furthermore, he paid special attention to strengthening the economic situation of the church. Around this time, he sponsored the building of the Church of the Holy Spirit in Pinsk and cared for the poor. In 1585, the bishop of Lutsko Ostrozhsky, John-Borzobahatyy Krasenskyy, died, and in May of that year, King Stefan Batory appointed Terlecki his successor. In August 1589, Ecumenical Patriarch Jeremias II appointed Terlecki as Exarch – the first for a Ukrainian bishop.

Church career

- 1575 – 1585 – Turov-Pinsk Orthodox bishop
- 1585 – 1595 – Lutsk-Ostrog Orthodox bishop
- 1596 – 1607 – Lutsk-Ostrog Uniate Bishop

Union

The decline of the Eastern Orthodox Church in the lands of the Commonwealth led Terlecki and other bishops to seek a rapprochement with the Catholic Church. In June 1590, the congress of bishops in Belha, Terlecki, together with other bishops, first raised the issue of the necessity of the Orthodox and Catholic churches. In 1594, at the Congress in the Zocalo, Terlecki instructed to negotiate the conclusion of a future union. In June 1595, members of the Council of Brest agreed on texts of the appeals to the Polish King Sigismund III Vasa and the Pope Clement VIII and decided to send a delegation consisting of Terlecki and Ipatii Potii to Rome. In 1596, Terlecki participated in the Council of Brest, which solemnly proclaimed the ecclesiastical union of the Metropolis of Kyiv and the Roman Catholic Church. In 1598, King Sigismund III Vasa bestowed the title of archimandrite upon him. Following his death, he was buried at the Cathedral of Lutsk.

Eastern Orthodox Church titles
Preceded by	Bishop of Pinsk and Turow; 1575–1585	Succeeded by Leontiy Pelchytskyi
Preceded by Jonas Borzobahatyi	Bishop of Lutsk–Ostroh; 1586–1596	Succeeded by Isaak Boryskovych (after revival)
Preceded by	Exarch of the Ruthenians; 1586–1596	Succeeded by Hedeon Balaban
Catholic Church titles
Preceded by converted	Bishop of Lutsk–Ostroh; 1596–1607	Succeeded by Eustakhiy Malinski
