= Hypatius Pociej =

Metropolitan of Kiev, Galicia and all Ruthenia (1599–1613)

- Metropolitan of Kiev
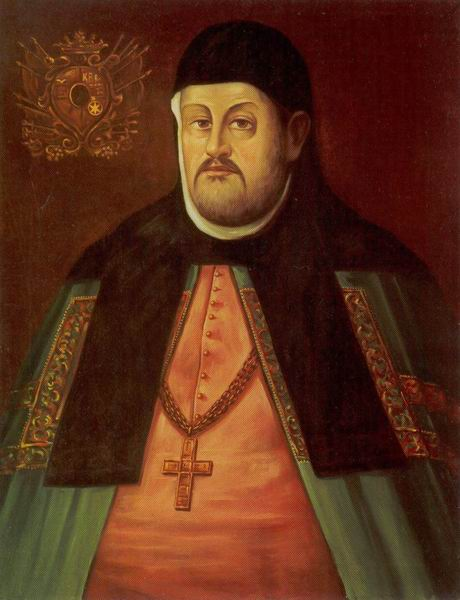
- Church: Ruthenian Uniate Church
- Appointed: 15 November 1600
- Term ended: 8 July 1613
- Predecessor: Michael Rahoza
- Successor: Joseph Rutski

Orders
- Consecration: 6 June 1593 (Bishop) by Michael Rahoza

Personal details
- Born: Adam Tyczkowicz; 12 April 1541 Różanka, Brest Litovsk Voivodeship
- Died: 18 July 1613 (aged 72) Volodymyr, Volhynian Voivodeship

Hypatius Pociej (Belarusian: Іпацій Пацей, Polish: Hipacy Pociej, Ukrainian: Іпатій Потій) (12 April 1541 – 18 July 1613) was the "Metropolitan of Kiev, Galicia and all Ruthenia" (Note: The title is also known as the Metropolis of Kiev, Halych and all Rus' or Metropolis of Kyiv, Halychyna, and All-Rus'. The name "Galicia" is a Latinized form of Halych, one of several regional principalities of the medieval state of Kievan Rus'.) in the Ruthenian Uniate Church — a sui juris Eastern Catholic Church in full communion with the Holy See. He reigned from 1599 to his death in 1613. He played an active role in the 1595 Union of Brest of which he was a firm supporter. He was also a writer, polemist and theologian.

== Early life ==
Adam Tyczkowicz was born on 12 April 1541 from a noble family. His father, Lev Tyczkowicz, was scribe of the Queen of Poland (Anna Jagiellon). His mother, Anna Łosa, after the death of her husband, on about 1550, married the governor of areas of Smolensk. Prince Mikolaj "the Black" Radziwill took care of his education and sent him to a Calvinist school and later in the Jagiellonian University in Kraków. In 1572 Adam was secretary of king Sigismund II Augustus and in 1580 he was judge in Brest. In 1588 he was Castellan of Brest and a senator of the Polish–Lithuanian Commonwealth.

In his youth, under the influence of Prince Radziwill, Adam converted to Calvinism, but about 1574, scared about the extremes of that denomination he returned to the Orthodox Church. In the same year he married Anna, of the dukes of Hołowniów-Ostrożeckich, with whom he had six children.

== Bishop ==
After the death of his wife in 1592, he chose to become a monk, taking the religious name of Ipati (Hypatius). In 1593, thanks to the support of Konstanty Wasyl Ostrogski (a Prince of the Polish–Lithuanian Commonwealth) who was his close friend, he was appointed as the Bishop of Volodymyr-Brest. He was consecrated bishop on 6 June 1593 by the hands of Mykhajlo Rohoza.

Hypatius played a crucial role in establishing of the Union of Brest by which the Ruthenian Church moved from the jurisdiction of the Patriarchate of Constantinople to the jurisdiction of the Pope, thus forming the Ruthenian Uniate Church. He traveled to Rome, along with the Bishop of Lutzk Cyril Terlecki, to carry the petition to Pope Clement VIII which had been signed by the bishops in Brest on 12 June 1595. They arrived in Rome on 25 November 1595 and obtained the approval of the Pope on the conditions that Byzantine rite, liturgical practices and the not-use of the filioque would be preserved. They were back in Lutzk in March 1596.

== Metropolitan ==
Hypatius Pociej was appointed new Metropolitan of Kiev in August 1599 by the will of king Sigismund III Vasa and he was confirmed by Pope Clement VIII on 15 November 1600. In 1601 he founded a seminary and on 3 March 1605 he was formally recognized as the only Byzantine Rite Metropolitan in the Polish–Lithuanian Commonwealth.

On 11 July 1609 some Orthodox, who opposed the Union of Brest, attempted to his life, but without success. In 1611 he succeeded to appoint also a bishop favorable to the Union of Brest in the Eparchy of Przemyśl. He also worked on the restructuring of the Order of Saint Basil the Great. Potii died on 8 July 1613 in Volodymyr and was buried in the cathedral of that town.

== Works ==
Hypatius Pociej was also a writer, polemist and theologian. Among his works we have: "The Union, or an Exposition of the Articles" (1595), "Antirysis" (Anti-Discourse, 1599), "A Defense of the Council of Florence" (1603), and "Harmony, or the Agreement of Faiths" (1608). He wrote numerous letters, also to Lew Sapieha and Konstanty Wasyl Ostrogski.

== Consecrated bishops ==
- 1603 Paisius Onyskevych-Sakhovsky (Bishop of Pinsk and Turov)
- 1610 Athanasius Krupetsky (Bishop of Przemysl)
- 1613 Joseph Velamin-Rutski

== Notes ==
Eastern Orthodox Church titles
Preceded by Meletiy Khreptovich	Bishop of Volodymyr and Brest; 1593 – 1596	Succeeded by converted Josyf Kurtsevich-Koriat (never enthroned)
Ruthenian Uniate Church titles
Preceded by converted	Bishop of Volodymyr and Brest; 1596 – 1599	Succeeded by Joakym Morokhovskyj
Preceded by Michael Rohoza	Metropolitan of Kiev, Galicia and all Ruthenia; 1599 – 1613	Succeeded by Jazep Rutski
