= Articles for the Reassurance of the Ruthenian people =

1632 Ukrainian law recognising Eastern Orthodox Church

The Articles for the Reassurance of the Ruthenian People (Ukrainian: Статті для заспокоєння руського народу) was a state-political act issued by King Władysław IV Vasa and approved by the Sejm in January 1632, which legalized the existence of the Eastern Orthodox Church in the Polish–Lithuanian Commonwealth. The goal of the document was to resolve the conflict between two Catholic confessions (Roman and Greek) versus Eastern Orthodox. The failure to follow the document was one of the factors that led to the Khmelnytskyi Uprising.

== History ==
After the death of the Polish king Sigismund III Vasa (April 1632), the Cossack Officers sent their representatives to the convocation Sejm with the demand to be allowed to participate in the elections of the new king and to ease national and religious oppression. At the provincial sejmiks in Ukraine, the issue of the need to return to Eastern Orthodox believers their rights, which they were deprived of after the conclusion of the Union of Brest in 1596, was discussed. For example, at the Sejmik in Pryluky, the Zaporizhzhian Cossacks drew up instructions for their delegates, in which they demanded a positive decision at the Sejm on the restoration of the rights of the Eastern Orthodox church. Similar demands were put forward by the brotherhoods (confraternities), in particular, the Lviv and Vilnius brotherhoods. The latter even produced a special brochure for the convocation of the Sejm called "Synopsis" - "Brief description of rights, freedoms and liberties...".

The demands of the Ukrainian population were also supported by the Eastern Orthodox church hierarchy, led by the archimandrite of the Kyiv-Pechersk Lavra, Peter Mohyla. Since the Protestants also demanded the return of the rights taken from them, Petro Mohyla found support from the Lithuanian hetman Prince Krzysztof "Piorun" Radziwiłł.

On June 22, 1632, at the Convocation Sejm in Warsaw, the Eastern Orthodox and Protestants jointly submitted their demands, formulated in 14 points. During the work of the commission (Petro Mohyla from the Eastern Orthodox, Joseph Velamin-Rutski from the Uniates), headed by Prince Vladyslav, a draft agreement was concluded between representatives of the Eastern Orthodox and Catholic clergy (it contained 9 points).

In September–November 1632, at the Electoral Sejm, under the pressure of Eastern Orthodox delegates (among them Adam Kisiel), who demanded immediate recognition of freedom of religion and the rights of the Eastern Orthodox Church, a new commission was created, and the "Articles" were prepared. According to this document, the Eastern Orthodox Church in Ukraine officially received the right to have its own hierarchy headed by the metropolitan and 4 bishops (Lviv, Lutsk, Przemyśl, Mstislav), to conduct services freely, to have churches, monasteries, printing houses, schools, brotherhoods. Churches and monasteries in Kyiv were returned to the Eastern Orthodox Church (except for the Vydubychi Monastery). Petro Mohyla was elected Eastern Orthodox Metropolitan of Kyiv.

The "Articles" were of a compromising nature and could not finally settle the religious issue in Ukraine and Belarus. In addition, after being elected king, Władysław IV, under the pressure of the Polish nobility, annulled some clauses of this act. Persecution of the Eastern Orthodox Church became one of the reasons for the national liberation uprisings of the 1630s and the national liberation war of the Ukrainian people led by Bohdan Khmelnytskyi.

== See also ==
- Smolensk War
- Metropolis of Kiev, Galicia and all Rus' (1441–1596)
- Metropolis of Kiev, Galicia and all Rus' (1620–1686)
