= Zhelon =

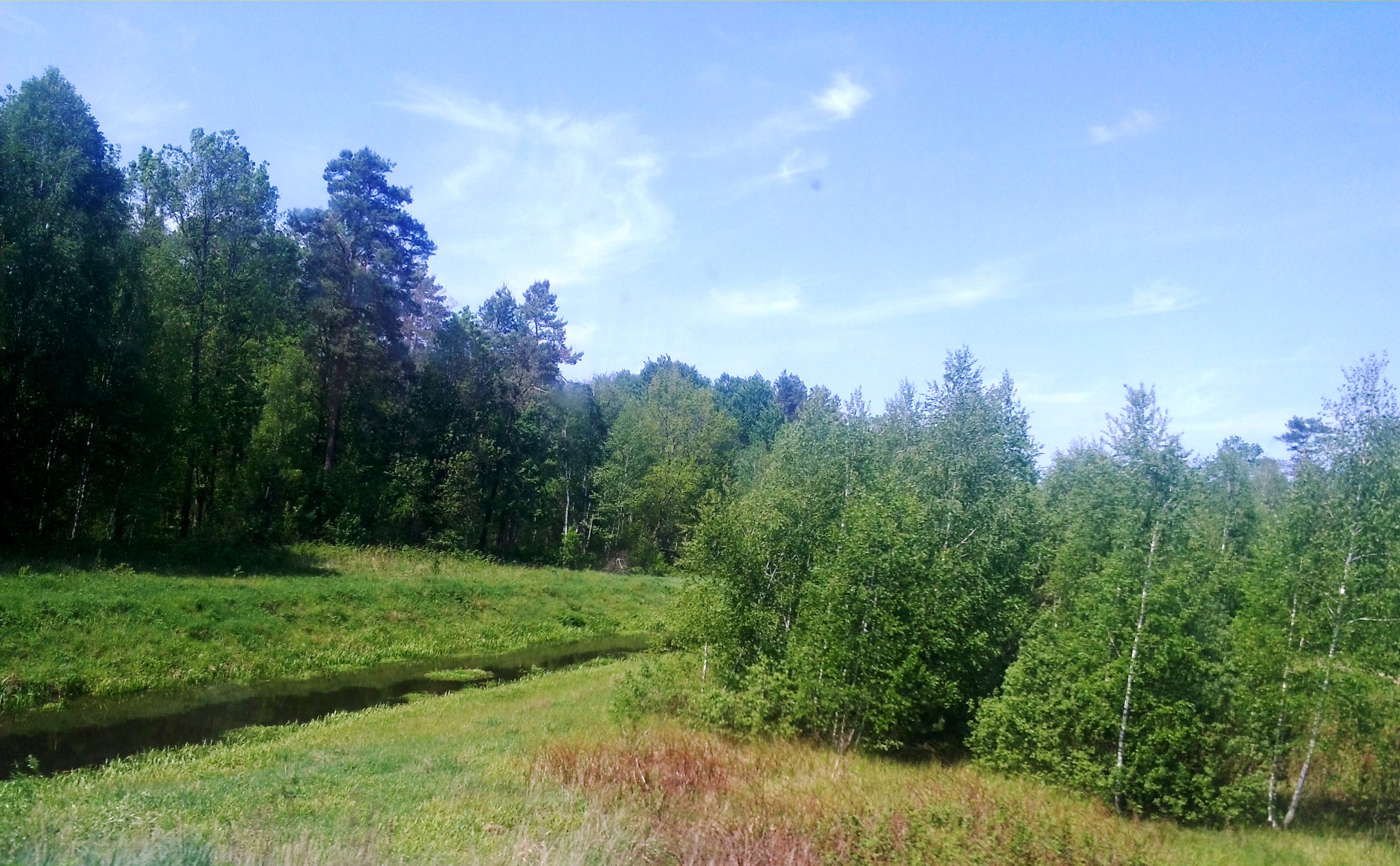

Location
- Countries: Belarus, Ukraine

Physical characteristics
- Mouth: Pripyat River
  - coordinates: 51.5682°N 29.8025°E
- Length: 113 km (70 mi)
- Basin size: 1,460 km^{2} (560 sq mi)

Basin features
- Progression: Pripyat→ Dnieper→ Dnieper–Bug estuary→ Black Sea

The Zhelon (Russian: Желонь; Belarusian: Жалонь; Ukrainian: Жолонь) is a river in Zhytomyr Oblast, Ukraine and Gomel Region, Belarus. It is a right tributary of the Pripyat River and approximately 113 km (70 mi) long.
