= Joakym Morokhovskyj =

Joakym Morokhovskyj, O.S.B.M.
- Bishop of Volodymyr–Brest
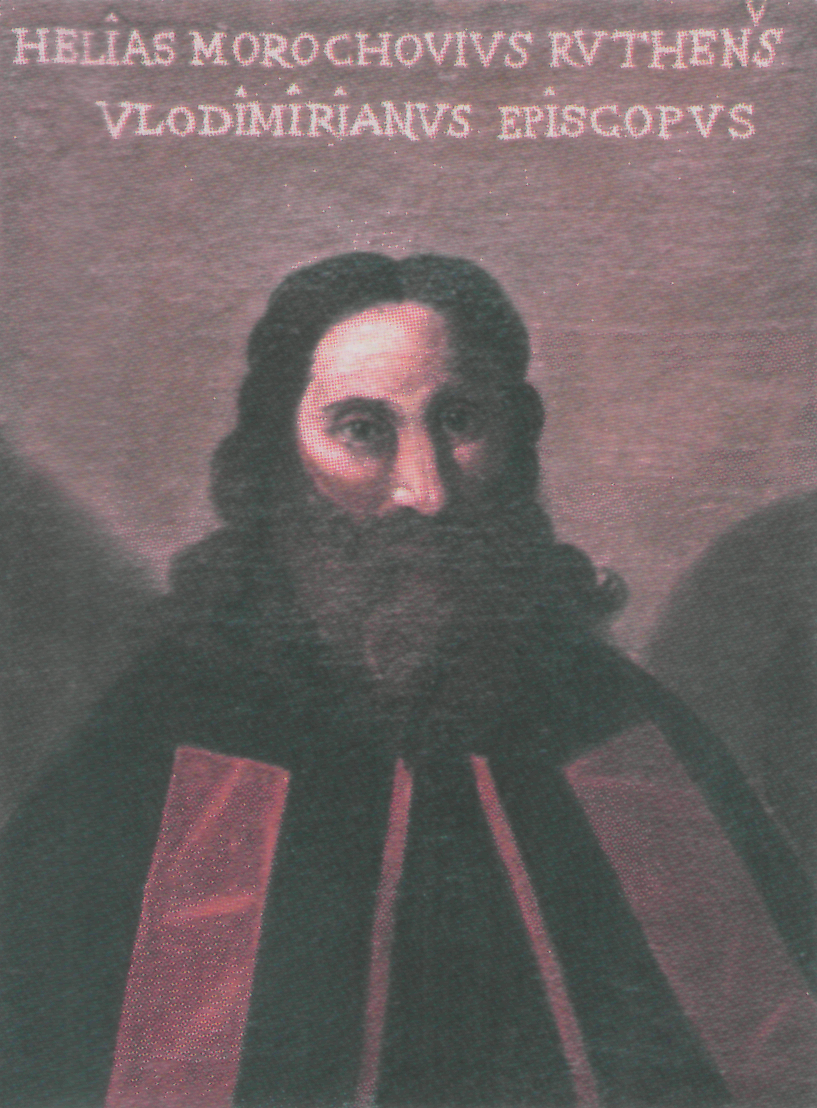
- Church: Ukrainian Greek Catholic Church
- Appointed: 9 August 1613
- Term ended: 19 March 1631
- Predecessor: Ipatij Potij
- Successor: Josyf Bakoveckyj-Mokosij

Orders
- Ordination: 1611 (Priest)
- Consecration: 3 July 1614 (Bishop)

Personal details
- Born: Illja Morokhovskyj; 1576 Lviv, in Ukraine
- Died: 19 March 1631 (aged 54–55) Volodymyr, in Ukraine

Joakym Illja Morokhovskyj (Belarusian: Яўхім Ілья Марахоўскі, Ukrainian: Йоаким Ілля Мороховський, Polish: Joachim Eliasz Morochowski) - (1576 in Lviv – 19 March 1631 in Volodymyr) was a Greek-Catholic Bishop of Volodymyr–Brest from 1613 to 1631.

== Life ==
He studied at the Pontifical Greek College of Saint Athanasius in Rome and then served as secretary to the Polish king Sigismund III Vasa. In 1612 he joined the Basilian monastic order, and in 1614 he was consecrated bishop of Volodymyr. He worked with Metropolitans Ipatij Potij and Josyf Rutskyj to extend the Uniate church.

Morokhovskyj wrote a number of works of polemical literature directed against Orthodoxy, including Paryhoria (1612, a response to Meletius Smotrytsky) and Dyskurs o początku rozerwania cerkwi greckiej od kościoła rzymskiego (A Discussion on the Origins of the Separation of the Greek Church from the Roman Church, 1622). He also wrote biographies of Josaphat Kuntsevych and Potij.

== Notes ==
Catholic Church titles
Preceded by Ipatij Potij	Bishop of Volodymyr–Brest; 1613 – 1631	Succeeded by Josyf Bakoveckyj-Mokosij
