= Waterway E40 =

Proposed international waterway to connect the Baltic Sea to the Black Sea

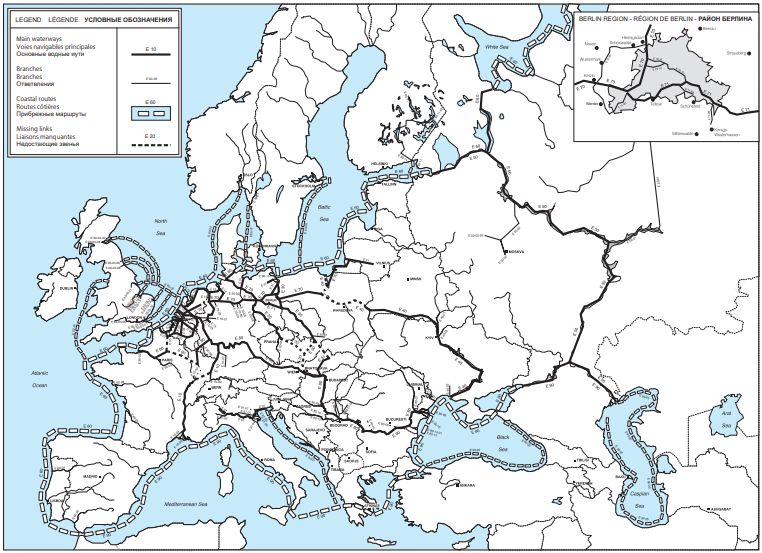
- The project of the scheme of the inland waterways of Europe

Waterway E40 is a planned navigable transport route that aims to connect the Baltic Sea and the Black Sea.

The length is approximately 2000 km. According to the project, the route runs from the city of Gdansk in Poland through the territory of the Republic of Belarus and to the city of Kherson in Ukraine.

The Ukrainian part of the E40 waterway will follow the riverbed of the Pripyat River through the Chernobyl exclusion zone and the river Dnieper to the city of Kherson and exit to the Black Sea. The total area of the regions through which the E40 is to pass is about 392,949 square kilometres (151,718 sq mi), with a population of 28,690,834.

Officially, the planning of the E40 waterway is still at an early stage, but in Ukraine, strategic documents are already being prepared and individual project parts are being implemented. In particular, in 2020, the Pripyat River was dredged within the exclusion zone.

The implementation of the E40 project has attracted considerable criticism from international and local public organizations in all three countries, as well as experts in the biological and environmental fields. The international campaign "STOP E40" against the implementation of the waterway project has been created".

According to experts of scientific institutions of the Republic of Belarus, the construction of the waterway will have a significant negative impact on the natural and cultural heritage of Polesia, on the well-being of the population of Polesia (1), as well as on the global carbon balance, hydrological and radiation situations, economy, transport development. There are alternative scenarios for the construction of the E40 for the development of Polesia and transport links between Ukraine, Poland and Belarus. First of all, it is about the reorientation of the Polesia region to the ecotourism industry. This was confirmed by a study conducted by Aivar Ruukel, a member of the board of the Global Ecotourism Network and a tour operator in the Soomaa National Park, Estonia.

The press has repeatedly stated that the E40 waterway is a restoration of an ancient transport route "from Varangians to the Greeks".

== The story of the project ==
In 1996 in Geneva European Agreement on Main Inland Waterways of International Importance (AGN). Geneva, 19 January 1996 was signed. This list also includes E40 ("Е" is a category of inland waterway of international significance. The numbers 10, 20, 30, 40, and 50, which grow from west to east, are assigned to the main roads, mostly north-south, that connect one sea basin to another).

The map of the E40 path first appeared in a document (white paper) United Nations Economic Commission for Europe (UNECE) "White Paper on the progress, accomplishment and future of sustainable inland water transport" and was published separately on the resources of the UNECE.

In the early 2010s, a Polish-Belarusian-Ukrainian business consortium was created, which from Ukraine included not the central state bodies responsible for transport or the environment, but the Volyn Regional Water Resources Management and the NGO "Volyn Association of Scientists and Innovators". Although the project route will not pass through the territory Volyn region, it depends on the water resources of this area and will affect the local hydrological situation. Also, the invitation of participants from this area is explained by the intention to receive financial support under the Program of Cross-border Cooperation Poland-Belarus-Ukraine, funded by the European Union. On December 1, 2013, the project "Restoration of the main waterway E-40 on the Dnieper-Vistula section from strategy to planning"(2007-2015) was launched with a budget of more than 0.9 million euros. The EU funds amounted to € 821,281, the participants ' own funds - €91376. This money was spent mainly on the preliminary assessment (feasibility study) of the project and lobbying for the project. In 2015, a preliminary feasibility study of the project was published. According to this preliminary assessment, the route will pass through river systems of rivers Vistula, Zakhodni Bugа, Pina, Pripyat and Dnieper. As a result of the project, the riverbeds of these rivers will be changed: straightened / supported by dam/ deepened / widened or drained.

Although some sections of the ship's course already exist, the scale of the proposed new development is so global that, according to experts, an environmental disaster in the region is highly possible.

Today, international and European financial institutions have not agreed financing the E40, because they have quite strict requirements for the environmental friendliness of the projects they support.

=== Project implementation in Ukraine ===
On October 4, 2019, as part of the participation in the Second Forum of the Regions of Ukraine and Belarus, the President of Ukraine Volodymyr Zelenskyy and the President of the Republic of Belarus Alexander Lukashenko concluded an agreement, according to which in 2020 the Ukrainian side was to conduct dredging on the Pripyat and Dnieper rivers, necessary to restore full-fledged ship traffic.

On February 6, 2020, the Minister of Infrastructure of Ukraine Vladyslav Krykliy stated that «the project to restore the E-40 river route has reached the stage of practical implementation».

In the summer and autumn of 2020, dredging was carried out on the Pripyat River at eight points. Environmental impact assessment of these works was not carried out.

On September 30, 2020, Cabinet of Ministers of Ukraine adopted a resolution "On Amendments to the List of inland waterways classified as navigable". This regulation also includes E40.

On November 25, 2020, the Cabinet of Ministers of Ukraine approved the draft Agreement between the Cabinet of Ministers of Ukraine and the Government of the People’s Republic of China a on strengthening cooperation in the field of infrastructure construction and authorized the Minister of Infrastructure Vladyslav Krykliy to sign this Agreement. This opens the way for the project's lobbyists to obtain Chinese loans for the construction of the E40.

On December 11, 2020, the website State Agency of Ukraine for Exclusion Zone Management published the Announcement of the publication of the Strategy for the development of the exclusion zone in 2021-2030. The draft strategy contains section 5.9. Development of transport infrastructure, which is entirely devoted to lobbying for the construction of the E40 through the exclusion zone. After critical statements of public organizations, State Agency of Ukraine for Exclusion Zone Management promised to exclude this section from the strategy.

== International public campaign «Save Polesia» ==
"Save Polesia" is part of the international coalition Save Polesia, which unites public organizations from Belarus, Ukraine, Poland and Germany. The goal of the campaign is to promote Polesia as a unique nature reserve with high environmental and cultural significance, including for obtaining the status of a World Heritage Site and the cancellation of the construction of the E40 waterway. By 2020, the public campaign against the construction of the E40 waterway, which can pass through the rivers of Poland, Belarus and Ukraine, was called "Stop E40". The coalition believes that the E40 project is poorly thought out and economically impractical, and the construction of the E40 itself will be a disaster both for the unique region of the Belarusian Polesia, and for a number of valuable natural territories of Poland and Ukraine. The campaign still uses the hashtag #stop_E40 in social networks.

The public campaign "Save Polesia" wants to draw the attention of the governments of Belarus, Poland, Ukraine and the European Parliament to the threat to the valuable natural territories of Polesia and to demonstrate that any decisions on the construction of the E40 waterway project should be made with the active participation of the public and independent experts. According to the coalition members, the E40 waterway project has dubious economic value and clearly poses a serious threat to nature. At the same time, the virgin territory of Polesia has great potential for promoting ecotourism, strengthening local business and sustainable development of the entire region. In September 2020, leading European environmental organizations sent an open letter to the President of Ukraine, Volodymyr Zelenskyy. In their address, they expressed serious concern about the start of construction of the Baltic-Black Sea megacanal.

Office of the President instructed the secretariat of the Cabinet of Ministers of Ukraine to respond to the letter, which in turn instructed this Ministry of Environmental Protection and Natural Resources of Ukraine. In the letter-response of the department dated 29.12.2020 No. 25/8-12/12524-20 is specified: «In connection with the intentions of dredging on the Ukrainian section of the Pripyat River, the Ministry has repeatedly in its appeals to the Ministry of Infrastructure emphasized the high probability of deterioration of water quality during dredging due to the presence of radioactive sediments there. Especially on the section of the Pripyat River within the territory of the exclusion zone, the zone of unconditional (mandatory) resettlement and in the upper reaches of the Kyiv reservoir. The issue of dredging in Pripyat requires a thorough scientific study of the current state of bottom sediments, analysis of the impact of dredging on natural ecosystems that are of particular environmental importance, in particular those located within the objects of the nature reserve Fund of Ukraine or in some areas in the immediate vicinity of these territories.».At the same time Minister Krykliy in his letter on the same topic did not comment on the lack of conclusions Strategic Environmental Assessment and Environmental Impact Assessment of the work in Pripyat and the start of construction of the E40.

== Economic indicators of the project according to the calculations of the developers ==
The cost of the construction of the canal is $ 12 billion. According to the project's lobbyists, the creation of the E-40 will allow to transport up to 4 million tons of cargo annually. This will revive trade between Poland, Belarus and Ukraine, whose total markets are almost 100 million people. According to the feasibility study, river transport makes it possible to transport large volumes of cargo. Thus, a 900-ton platform barge replaces 18 wagons or 45 twenty-ton trucks. The E40 channel is planned to transport millions of tons of cargo that will sail from the project countries (coal, ore, metal, potash fertilizers, table salt, sugar, crushed stone, peat, timber, sapropels, etc.) to the EU and further around the world. There is a hope to see ships with the flags of the Scandinavian countries on the route. In addition, the E-40 will provide significant time savings for carriers operating in the Central and Eastern European regions. Currently, the Rhine-Main-Danube connection (3,100 km) is used for cargo delivery in this direction. However, the E-40 is shorter than this connection by almost 1,000 kilometers (2,205 km). This means shortening the journey by 2-4 days at an average speed of 10-20 km/h for river cargo vessels. The asset also includes potential cross-border river cruises.

== Economic indicators of the project according to the calculations of other economists ==
The feasibility study of the E40 project was analyzed by Belarusian specialists of three professional associations: "Business Union of Entrepreneurs and Employers named after prof. M. S. Kunyavsky", "Republican Union of Industrialists and Entrepreneurs", "Belarusian Scientific and Industrial Association". This analysis revealed numerous miscalculations and outright mistakes of the authors of the feasibility study. In particular, the deputy director of the Union of Entrepreneurs and Employers named after Professor M. S. Kunyavsky Ales Gerasimenko noted that this waterway will be uncompetitive with road and rail transport if it is not subsidized.

The experts found that the economic analysis in the feasibility study was not detailed enough to draw unambiguous conclusions.It contains various methodological and factual errors and does not comply with international standards, in particular, the standards of the United Nations Industrial Development Organization (UNIDO). The feasibility study does not provide a clear value of the total amount of investment costs and a breakdown by category of expenses. In the description of some components of the project, figures are given, the total amount of which is just over 12 billion euros. But some items of expenditure are not included in this amount, and other items of expenditure are significantly underestimated. For example, the document does not contain an estimate of the cost of creating additional port infrastructure or reconstructing bridges. Although the experts of the Business Union of Entrepreneurs and Employers im. Kunyavsky believes that the investment costs for the development of the Ukrainian segment of the Dnieper river-even without the reconstruction of bridges-are underestimated by almost 100 million euros. They also claim that the investment costs on the Belarusian site are probably underestimated by at least 900 million euros. This suggests that the real cost of the project will exceed 13 billion euros. The cost of dredging the Dnieper River alone can reach one billion UAH annually.

Other critics of the E40 project warn that it is unpromising in terms of cargo turnover and will not pay off. It is pointed out that the potential cargo turnover on that route could instead be served by existing railroad infrastructure, which is currently underutilized and can potentially transport up to 20 times more cargo than it does today (as of 2017). A concern of harm and potential destruction of important nature conservation areas in Belarus and Poland is also pointed out.

According to experts, the main disadvantages of the project are the following:

1. The impact of an investment project on the environment is not quantified, measured, or reasoned.
2. The statement that the implementation of the project can lead to the creation of new attractive jobs is not reasoned.
3. The main part of the E40 economic analysis is based on the erroneous assumption that if funds are provided from public sources (for example, from the state budget or from EU funds), then when evaluating the effectiveness of investments from the public point of view, these costs do not need to be taken into account when calculating total expenditures.
4. Even if the construction costs are ignored, the analysis shows that the infrastructure created within the project is difficult to maintain only with the income generated during its current operation.
5. At a time when the benefits of reducing transport costs of carriers are mainly created for individuals, most of the investment costs (as well as possible additional costs associated, for example, with the degradation of river ecosystems) will be assigned to the society as a whole of the three countries (Belarus, Poland, Ukraine). This approach does not correspond to the "user pays" principle specified in the project materials.
6. The documents do not contain enough details regarding the cargo flow forecast used. Although a number of other assumptions are mentioned in the model description, it is not clear, for example, how many months of the year are taken as the navigation period for different waterway variants, since this assumption is consistent with the model adjusted for the conditions of the Netherlands.
7. The sensitivity analysis of the model to the underlying assumptions is not presented in this document. This is a particularly significant disadvantage, given the great uncertainty associated with such forecasts. This uncertainty was not only not evaluated in terms of the sensitivity of the assumptions made, but also in terms of the assumptions themselves (for example, by determining the standard errors in the forecast indicators).
8. A common error common to the entire report is the lack of a proper understanding by the developers of the concept of socio-economic well-being, which uses a benefit-cost analysis (i.e., comparing total expenditures - both public and private-with total benefits, again private and additional).
9. It is necessary to fully account for the investment costs in the analysis. Otherwise, the estimates of the internal rate of return (IRR) and the economic value of the network (NPV) presented in the report do not make economic sense.
10. The average cost of maintenance and repair of the hydrological infrastructure, expressed as a percentage of the project's investment cost (0.01%) at the first stage of activity, looks underestimated. Experience has shown that these costs would be expected to account for 3-5% of investment costs annually, especially in later periods.
11. The feasibility study does not contain the economic characteristics of the entire investment project as a whole, since it is noted that the economic analysis does not include the launch of other sections of the E40, that is, only sections of the E-40 waterway are covered: the channel connecting the Vistula and Mukhavets, as well as the Lower Vistula. This means that the analysis does not include investment and operating costs associated with the creation and maintenance of hydrological infrastructure, including in Belarus and Ukraine.
12. It is also planned to include the reduction of carbon dioxide emissions in the list of additional benefits that arise from the implementation of the project. At the same time, the document does not provide quantitative calculations of carbon dioxide emission reductions. On the other hand, the CO_{2} emissions associated with inland waterway transport are generally comparable to those from rail transport.
13. The work also does not take into account the existence of numerous protected natural areas especially valuable for the conservation of biodiversity in Belarus and Ukraine. These areas may also be damaged as a result of hydrological work. At the same time, the work does not take into account the corresponding additional costs as part of the project costs (including in the context of possible compensation payments or activities).
14. A more detailed economic assessment of the Document is useless, since it will not change the incorrect basic approach of evaluating the idea of the E40 project for its feasibility.

== Environmental risks of the project ==
=== Hydrological problems/drought ===
Today, the functioning of the Dnieper-Bug Canal, which is to become part of the E40, provokes significant hydrological problems. The weak link of the Dnieper-Bug water system is the uneven distribution of water resources throughout the year on the watershed (Dnieper-Bug): a large amount in the spring and a shortage in the low-water period. Most of the water during the year comes from the top of the Pripyat and the cascade of lakes: Svyatoe, Volyanskoe and Beloe, located along the upper reaches of the Pripyat in Ukraine. The transboundary problem of filling the Dnieper-Bug water system can cause degradation of the Pripyat riverbed, Svyatoe, Volyanskoe and Beloe lakes due to the operation of the water supply system.

=== Impact on biodiversity ===
The construction and operation of the waterway provides for a change in the hydro-morphological conditions of the entire Polesia region, which will lead to the degradation of valuable wetlands under national and international protection as a habitat for valuable species, and a number of vulnerable natural territories of Ukraine. The transboundary problem of filling the Dnieper-Bug water system can cause degradation of the Pripyat riverbed, Svyatoe, Volyanskoe and Beloe lakes due to the operation of the water supply system.Many parts of Polesia are of international importance as exceptional natural monuments, which have received the status of biosphere reserves UNESCO, objects under the protection of the Ramsar Convention. Due to the fact that the E40 waterway is a transboundary project, it is subject to international conventions ratified by Ukraine (in particular Espoo Convention, The Aarhus Convention),according to which Environmental Impact Assessment should be carried out in a single package in all three countries.

=== Radiation and chemical danger ===
The section of the new shipping route will pass through the territory affected by the Chernobyl catastrophe in 1986. The mouth of the Pripyat River was significantly polluted, some of the radioactive substances sank both at the bottom of the river and at the bottom of the Kyiv reservoir. During dredging operations in the riverbed in the territories adjacent to the Chernobyl exclusion zone and in the upper region of the Kyiv Reservoir water quality may deteriorate, and millions of Ukrainian citizens may face a radioactive threat due to contamination with radioactive sediments. In addition only one chemical transport accident on the E40 route can destroy the water supply system of Kyiv and have a negative impact on the water supply of other cities downstream of the Dnieper River.
