= Leontius Pełczycki =

Leontius Pełczycki (secular name: Lewko Zenowicz or Zienkowicz, died in 1595) was a bishop in the Orthodox and Uniate Catholic churches in Lithuania.

== Biography ==
Pełczycki was the son of the Bishop of Chelm, Zacharias. In 1577, his father gave up the office, and gave his son all rights to manage the Eparchy of Chelm. Three years later Bishop Leontius took the Chirotonia, thus being consecrated as bishop. In 1585, a decree of Stephen Báthory granted him privilege of the Pinsk-Turowski Cathedral. The royal document stated that Leontius gave the king considerable benefices. It is that, like some powerful intercession, that led to his appointment as Bishop of Pinsk-Turowski.

In the second document, the king confirmed the privileges of his predecessors Eparchy and slowed payment of municipal taxes and fees to the county. In disputes about Orthodox benefices, the Bishop fought with Radziwills and the descendants of King Ivan Horodecki advocated on his side. In 1588 the Báthory's successor, King Sigismund III Vasa, at the request of Bishop Leontius, named Athanasius Terlecki superior of the Leszczynski monastery and gave him the right of succession following Leontius' death. Later that year, however, Terlecki received the privilege of appointing him the Archbishop of Polotsk. The Leszczynski Monastery became directly subordinate to the bishop of Pinsk-Turowski.

== Conflicts with townspeople ==
Leontius did not enjoy the respect of the faithful, as he led a lavish lifestyle and neglected his eparchy, caring mostly about family interests. Repeatedly he fell into conflict with the townspeople. His work also assessed the patriarch of Constantinople Jeremias II, who in 1589, during his stay in the Grand Duchy of Lithuania, learned about the Bishop's tolerance of low morals among the clergy, including illegal re-canonical ordination of priests. Jeremiah forbade the clergy exercise of worship and the bishop threatened to deprive Pełczycki of his office absent reform.

== Orthodox Bishops Councils ==
In 1590 in Belz Leontius took part in the two councils of Orthodox bishops of the Republic to discuss the issue of a possible unification of the Orthodox and Catholic Churches. In June of this year, together with the bishops of Chelm, Dionysius (Zbyruyskyy), of Lutsk, Cyril Terlecki and Lviv, Hedeon Balaban he intended to convert to Catholicism while maintaining the Byzantine Rite. Information about this decision was not communicated to the faithful for fear of their reaction, and another council in Brest in 1591 was silent on issues of church union. On 2 December 1594 Leontius Pełczycki took part in a meeting with the Bishop of Lutsk Bernard Maciejowski, during which they discussed the proposed union, signing a collegiate letter of rejection of the union and the recognition of papal authority. On 12 June 1595 he signed the agreement on accession to the Union with the Roman church.

Leontius was killed in an accident in August 1595, when he fell out of his carriage. On 8 October 1595, a decree was promulgated concerning the Russian union with the Roman Church at the Cathedral of Brest. He was buried in the Monastery of Leszno in Pinsk.
