= Lauryshava Monastery =

Coordinates: 53°42′07″N 26°11′22″E

Lauryshava Monastery (Belarusian: Лаўрышаўскі манастыр) is an Eastern Orthodox monastery located in the Navahrudak rajon of the Hrodna voblast of Belarus. It is one of the oldest monasteries in the country.

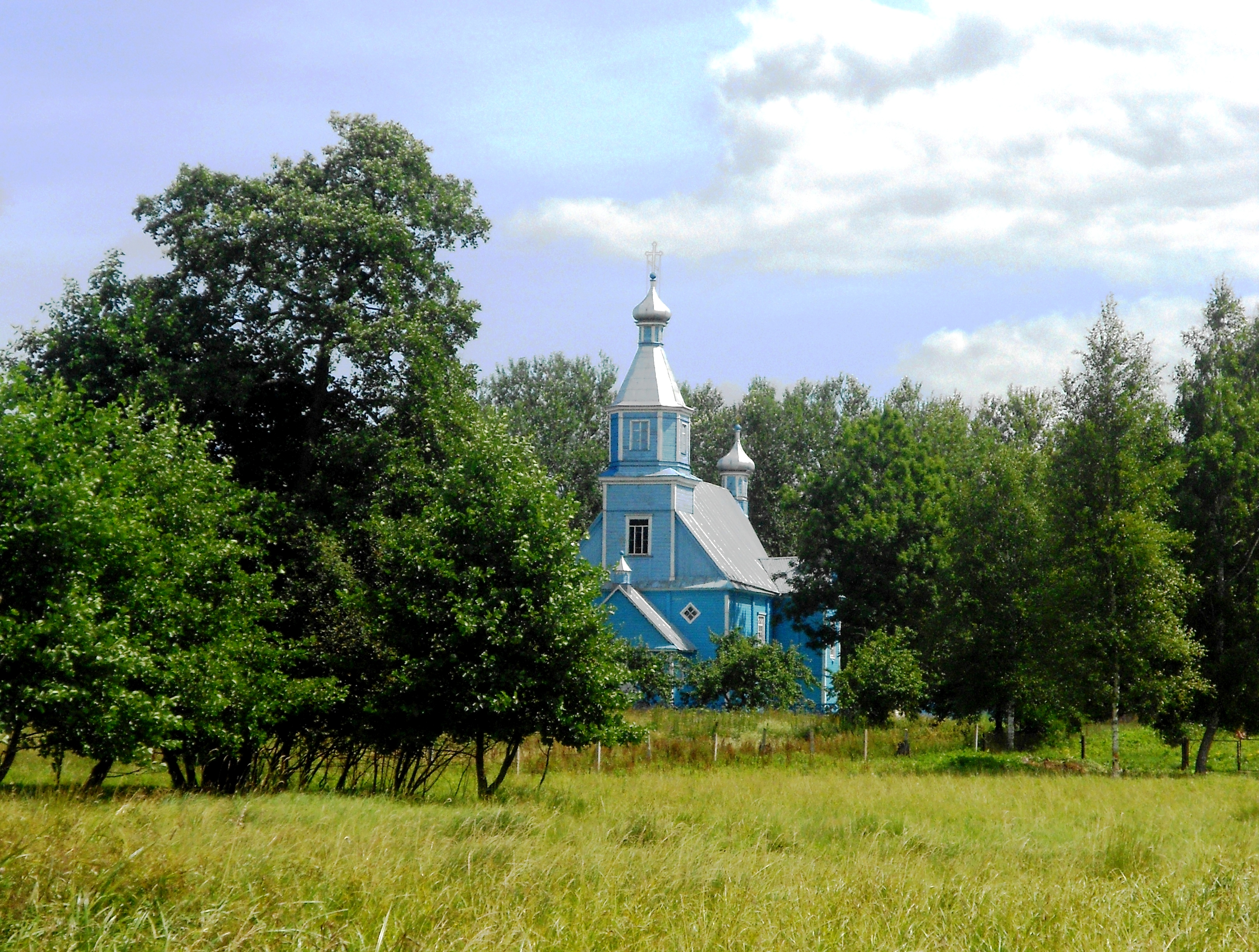
Shown in July 2013

According to Hypatian Chronicle, the monastery was founded around 1260 by the Lithuanian duke Voyshalk "on the river Nioman between Lithuania and Navahrudak". After adopting Orthodox Christianity, Voyshalk took the name Lawrence (Belarusian: Лаўрыш, Laurysh). The area was later named after the monastery's founder.

Around 1329, the Lauryshava gospel has been written for the monastery. According to the gospel, the monastery's name was Lauryshava Monastery of the Blessed Virgin (Belarusian: Найсвяцейшай Багародзіцы Лаўрыўшаўскі манастыр). The monastery had two churches, it operated a school and a library.

In 1530 the Tatars destroyed the monastery and killed all monks. The monastery has consequently been rebuilt and destroyed several times.

By 1824 the monastery had 5 residents, the library consisted of 500 volumes. In 1836 the monastery was closed down.

The monastery was then renewed in early 20th century but was then burnt down during the First World War in 1915.

In 1993, the Orthodox Archbishop of Białystok and Gdańsk Sawa (Hrycuniak) and the Bishop of Navahrudak and Lida Kanstantsin (Haranau) consecrated the site of the monastery church. The church was completed in 1998 and consecrated in honor of the Reverend Elisha of Lauryshava, the monastery's first abbot who had been canonized in 1514.

By the decision of the Holy Synod of the Belarusian Orthodox Church, on August 15, 2007 the parish was converted into the Monastery of St. Elisha of Lauryshava. In place of the original location of the monastery are conducted archaeological excavations.
