= Brahinka =

Brahinka / Braginka
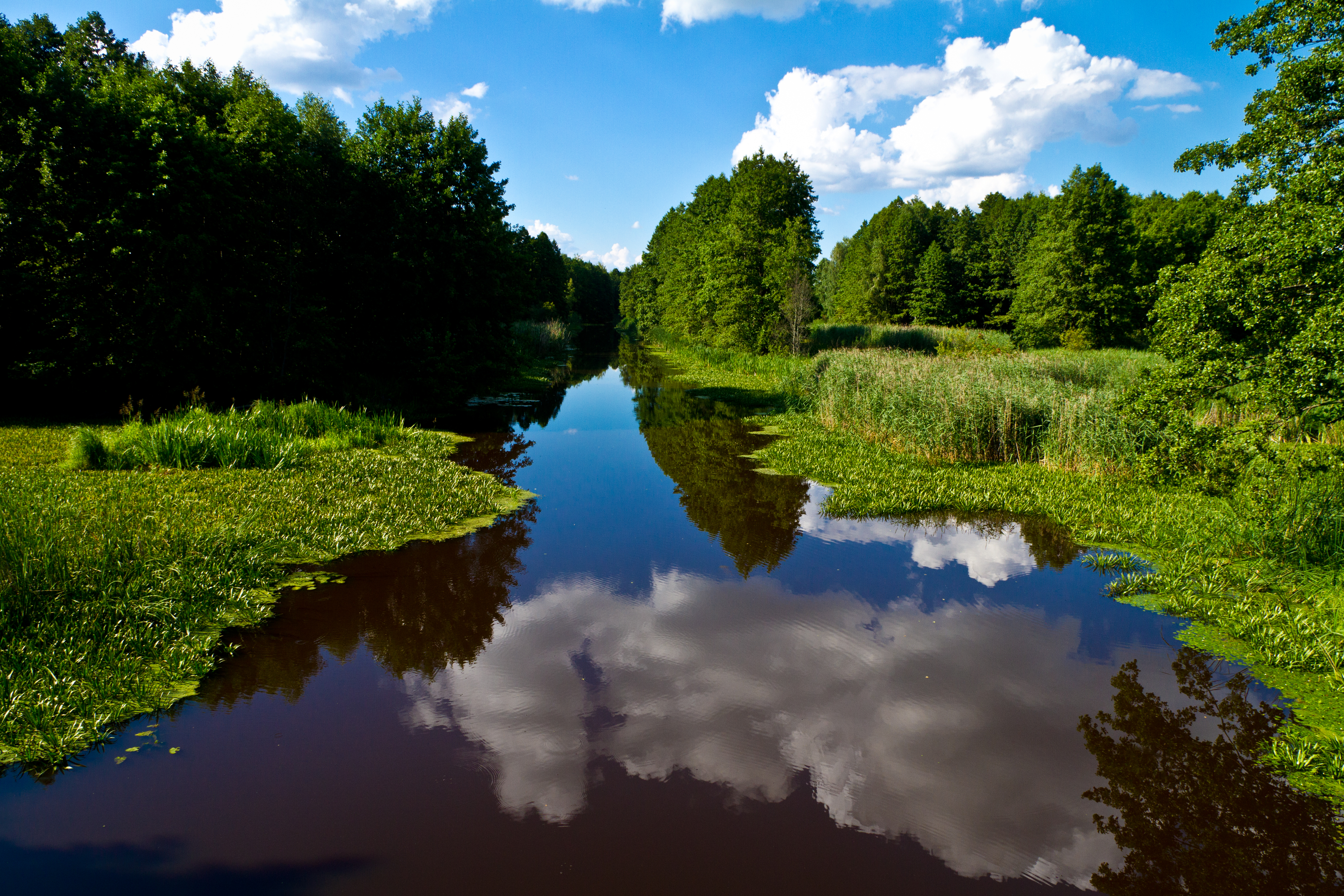
- Native name: Брагінка (Belarusian)

Location
- Country: Belarus

Physical characteristics
- Mouth
  - location: Pripyat
  - coordinates: 51.2138°N 30.4087°E
- Length: 179 km (111 mi)

Basin features
- Progression: Pripyat→ Dnieper→ Dnieper–Bug estuary→ Black Sea

The Brahinka or Braginka (Belarusian: Брагінка Belarusian pronunciation: [braˈɣʲinka]; Russian: Брагинка) is a short winding river in the Brahin District of Belarus. Its length is 179 km. It falls into Pripyat just above its falling into Dnieper. Part of the river flows through the radioactive zone of alienation, and the river itself is under regular control for nuclear pollution. The small settlement of Brahin stands on the banks of the river.

Konstantin Paustovsky's short story Корчма на Брагинке (The Inn on the Braginka) from 1946 is set here.
