= Ptsich =

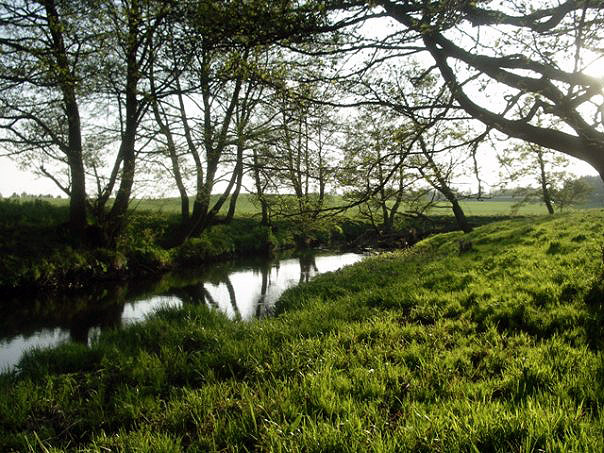

Location
- Country: Belarus

Physical characteristics
- Source
  - location: Pyetrykaw District
- Mouth: Pripyat River
  - coordinates: 52.1460°N 28.8645°E
- Length: 421 km (262 mi)
- Basin size: 9,470 km^{2} (3,660 sq mi)

Basin features
- Progression: Pripyat→ Dnieper→ Dnieper–Bug estuary→ Black Sea

The Ptsich, or Pcič (Belarusian: Пціч, [ptsʲitʂ]) is a river in Eastern Europe. It flows south through Belarus, taking its source near Minsk, and draining into the Pripyat, being its left tributary. It is 421 kilometres (262 mi) long, and has a drainage basin of 9,470 square kilometres (3,660 sq mi).

Its biggest tributary is the Aresa.
