= Sluch (Belarus) =

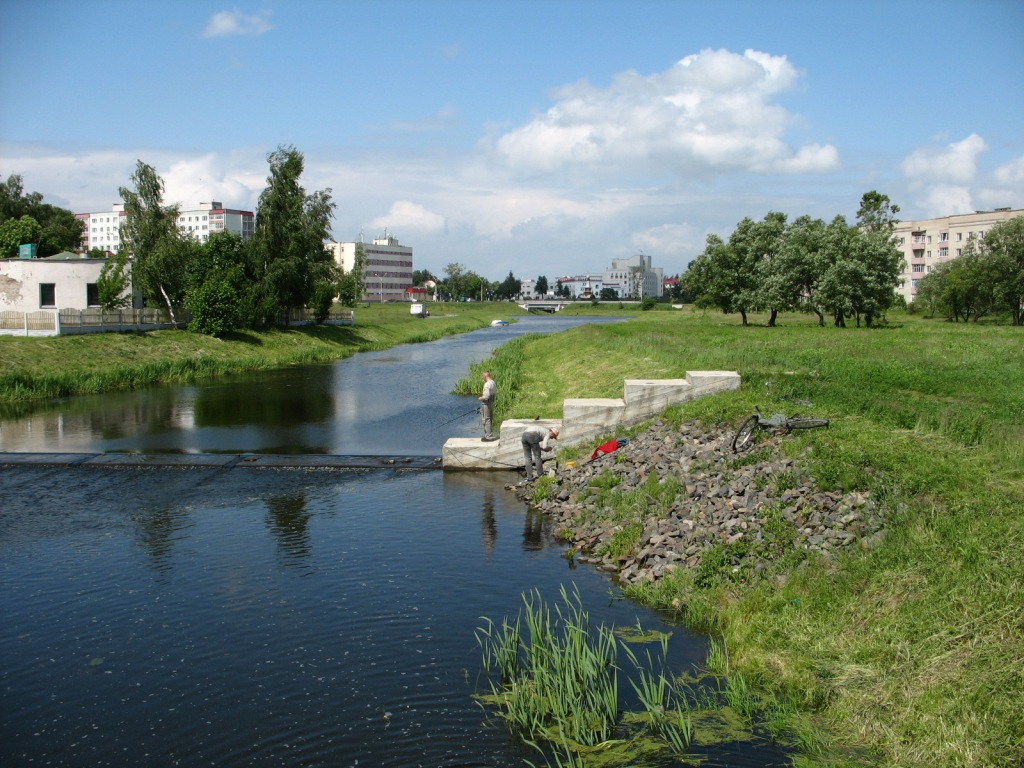
- Native name: Случ/ Паўночная Случ (Belarusian)

Location
- Country: Belarus

Physical characteristics
- Source
  - location: Minsk Oblast
- Mouth: Pripyat
  - coordinates: 52.1375°N 27.525°E
- Length: 228 km (142 mi)
- Basin size: 5,260 km^{2} (2,030 sq mi)
- Discharge
  - average: 20.3 m^{3}/s (720 cu ft/s)

Basin features
- Progression: Pripyat→ Dnieper→ Dnieper–Bug estuary→ Black Sea

The Sluch or Northern Sluch (Belarusian: Случ, Паўночная Случ; Russian: Случь, Северная Случь; Lithuanian: Slučė, Šiaurinė Slučė; Slovak: Sluč, Severní Sluč) is a river in Belarus. Rising in Minsk Oblast, it flows past the cities of Salihorsk and Slutsk, finally emptying into the Pripyat. It is 228 kilometres (142 mi) long, and has a drainage basin of 5,260 square kilometres (2,030 sq mi).

The Moroch River (also spelled Morocz or Morach), a right tributary of the Sluch, originates in the Kopyl' Ridge. Under Article 2 of the Treaty of Riga (1921), it defined part of the border between Poland and the Soviet Union.

== See also ==
- Sluch (Ukraine), or Southern Sluch
