= Hedeon Balaban =

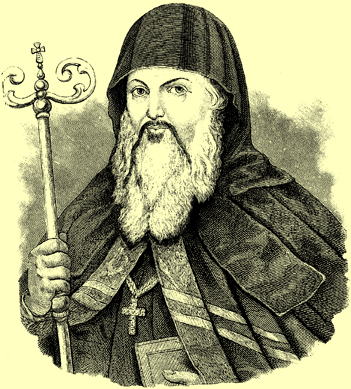

Hedeon (Hryhorii) Balaban (1530 – 10 February 1607), or Gedeon Bałaban, was the bishop of Lviv from 1569 to 1607.

Balaban was born in 1530. He took the side of the Eastern Orthodox church against the Polish Roman Catholics, in particular the Roman Catholic archbishop of Lviv. He resisted introduction of the Gregorian calendar in 1582 and struggled against the Lviv Dormition Brotherhood on behalf of episcopal authority. Starting in 1590, he took part in negotiations over union with the Roman Catholic Church, but joined with Prince Kostiantyn Ostrozky at the Council of Berestia in 1596 in opposition to the Union of Brest. He maintained this position until his death.

In 1599 he established a Greco-Slavic printing press with his nephew Fedir Balaban in Striatyn and then later in Krylos where he published various church books. Throughout his life, Balaban supported Orthodox brotherhood schools. He died on 10 February 1607 in Lviv.

Eastern Orthodox Church titles
Preceded by Arseniy Balaban	Bishop of Lwow and Kamieniec-Podolski; 1569 – 1607	Succeeded by Yeremia Tyssarovskyi
Preceded by Kyrylo Terletskyi	Exarch of the Ruthenians; 1596 – 1607	Succeeded by Yeremia Tyssarovskyi
