= Stsviha =

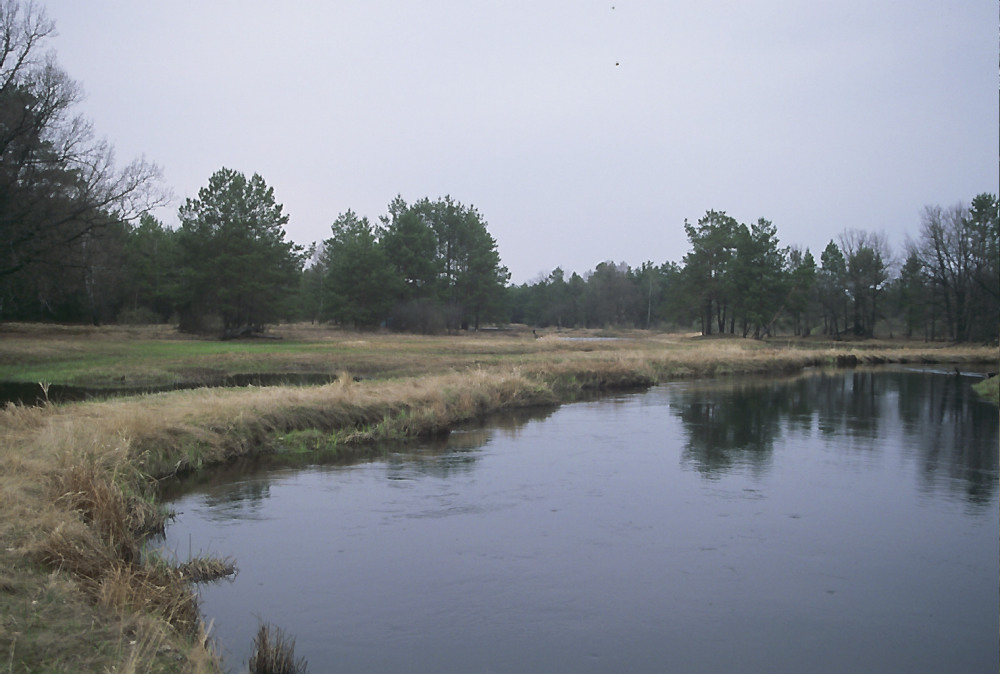

Location
- Country: Ukraine, Belarus

Physical characteristics
- Mouth: Pripyat River
  - coordinates: 52.0602°N 27.9037°E

Basin features
- Progression: Pripyat→ Dnieper→ Dnieper–Bug estuary→ Black Sea

The Stsviha (Belarusian: Сцвіга) or Stvyha (Ukrainian: Ствига) is a river of Ukraine and Belarus. It is a tributary of the Pripyat River in the Dnieper basin. A notable marsh wetland known as the Polesia, home to about 265 different species of bird, lies between the Pripyat, Stsviha and Ubort Rivers.
