= Dionysius (Zbyruyskyy) =

Dionysius Zbyruyskyy (worldwide Dmitry Hrytskovych; Ukrainian: Діонісій Збируйський) (died 18 November 1603) was the Bishop (Eparch) of the Eparchy of Chełm–Belz in the Ruthenian Uniate Church. From 1585, he had been the Orthodox Bishop of Kholm.

== Biography ==
Dionysius Zbyruyskyy (Dmitry Hrytskovych) was a customs clerk in Krasnystaw. He was married to Anna Ilyashevych, daughter of Chełm Bishop Zacharias Ilyashevych. He had a son, Michael.

The first written mention of the nomination of Dionysius in Chełm is dated on 25 October 1585 and again in 24 November 1585. As bishop of Kholmsk, Dionysius took part in preparatory synods about the union with the Roman Church. On 22 June 1595, Dionysius put his signature to the joint document Ruthenian hierarchs, which they turned to Pope Clement VIII, expressing a desire to conclude a union. From 1595 up to his death in 1603, he was the first Ukrainian Catholic bishop of the Kholm Eparchy.
