= Pripyat (river) =

River in Eastern Europe

Pripyat Prypiat, Prypiać, Prypeć
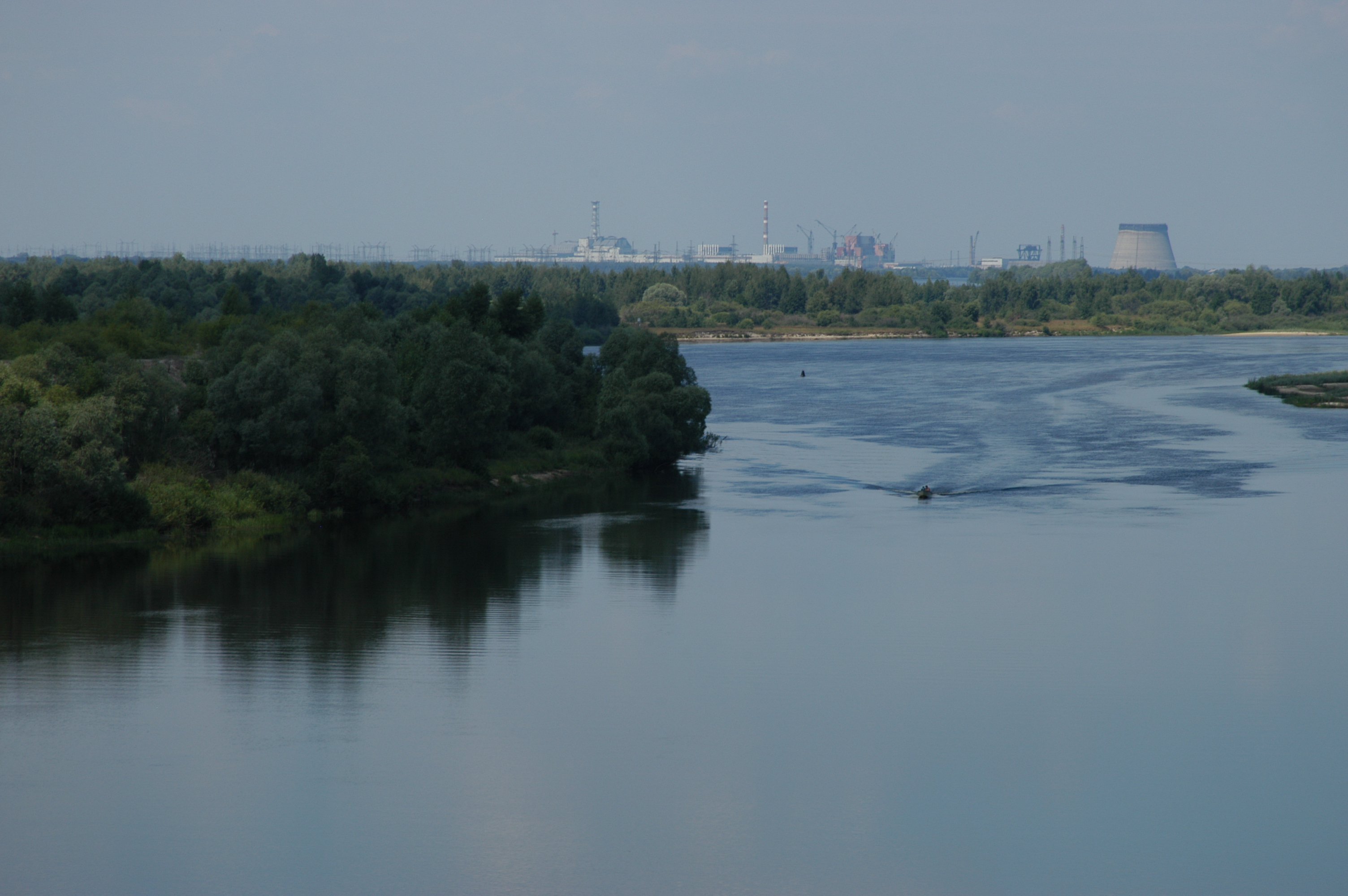
- The Pripyat River, with the Chernobyl Nuclear Power Plant behind it

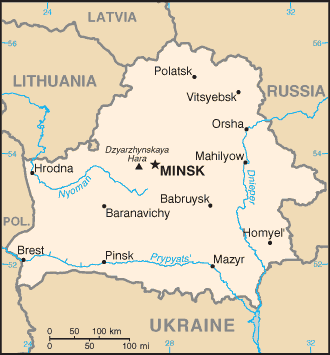
- Course of the Pripyat River

Location
- Country: Ukraine, Belarus

Physical characteristics
- Source
  - location: Volyn Oblast, Ukraine
  - coordinates: 51.3333°N 23.7905°E
- Mouth: Dnieper
  - location: Kyiv Reservoir
  - coordinates: 51°09′31″N 30°29′27″E
- Length: 761 km (473 mi)
- Basin size: 121,000 km^{2} (47,000 mi^{2})
- Discharge
  - average: 377 m^{3}/s (13,300 cu ft/s)

Basin features
- Progression: Dnieper→ Dnieper–Bug estuary→ Black Sea
- Tributaries
  - left: Pina, Yaselda, Tsna, Lan, Sluch, Ptsich, Brahinka
  - right: Turiya, Stokhid, Styr, Horyn, Stsviha, Ubort, Zhelon, Slovechna, Uzh

The Pripyat or Prypiat (Note: /ˈpriːpjət, ˈprɪpjət/ PREE-pyət, PRIP-yət; Ukrainian: Прип'ять, IPA: [ˈprɪpjɐtʲ]; Belarusian: Прыпяць, romanized: Prypiać, IPA: [ˈprɨpʲat͡sʲ]; Polish: Prypeć, IPA: [ˈprɨpɛtɕ]; Russian: Припять, IPA: [ˈprʲipʲɪtʲ].) is a river in Eastern Europe. The river, which is approximately 761 km (473 mi) long, flows east through Ukraine, Belarus, and into Ukraine again, before draining into the Dnieper at Kyiv Reservoir.

== Name etymology ==
Max Vasmer notes in his etymological dictionary that the historical name of the river mentioned in the earliest East Slavic document, the Primary Chronicle, is Pripet' (Припеть), and cites the opinion of other linguists that the name meant "tributary", comparing with Greek and Latin roots. He also rejects some opinions which were improperly based on the stem -пять -pjat', rather than original -петь.

The name may also derive from the local word pripech used for a river with sandy banks.

== Geography ==
The Pripyat begins in the Volhynian Upland, between the villages of Budnyky and Rohovi Smoliary in Volyn Oblast, Ukraine. 204 km downstream, it crosses the border of Belarus, where it travels 500 km through Polesia, Europe's largest wilderness, within which lie the vast sandy wetlands known as the Pripet Marshes, a dense network of swamps, bogs, rivers and rivulets within a forested basin. For the last 50 kilometers the Pripyat flows again in Ukraine and flows several kilometers south of Chernobyl into the Kyiv Reservoir.

The length of the river is 775 km, and the area of the watershed is 114,300 km^{2}. The width of the floodplain varies from 4 to 15 km over the course of the river, with occasional flooding reaching 30 km. 495 km (308 mi) of the whole river length lies within Belarus, with the rest in Ukraine.

The Pripyat is navigable up to Pinsk, where the Dnieper-Bug Canal leads to the Bug River.

The Pripyat passes through the exclusion zone established around the site of the Chernobyl nuclear disaster. The nearby city of Pripyat, Ukraine (population 45,000), which was named after the river, was completely evacuated after the Chernobyl disaster.

The Pripyat is known for its numerous oxbow lakes and channels.

== Dredging for E40 waterway ==
Dredging of the river started in 2020 to enable the E40 waterway to pass through the area. The dredging raised concerns about radioactive contamination around the Chernobyl nuclear power plant, as the river comes within 2.5 km (1.6 mi) of the nuclear reactor.

== See also ==
- Dnieper–Bug Canal

== Notes ==
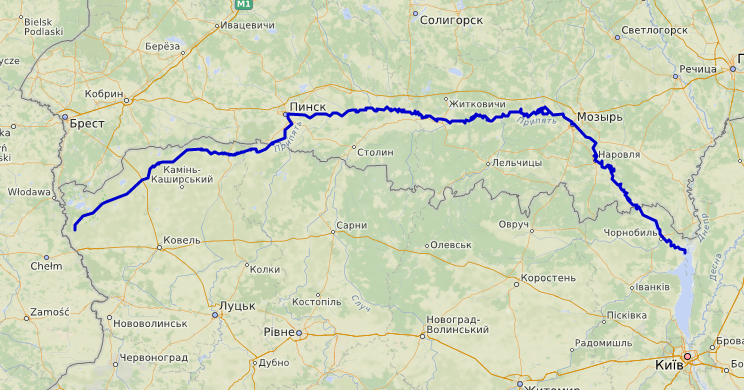
A map of the Pripyat

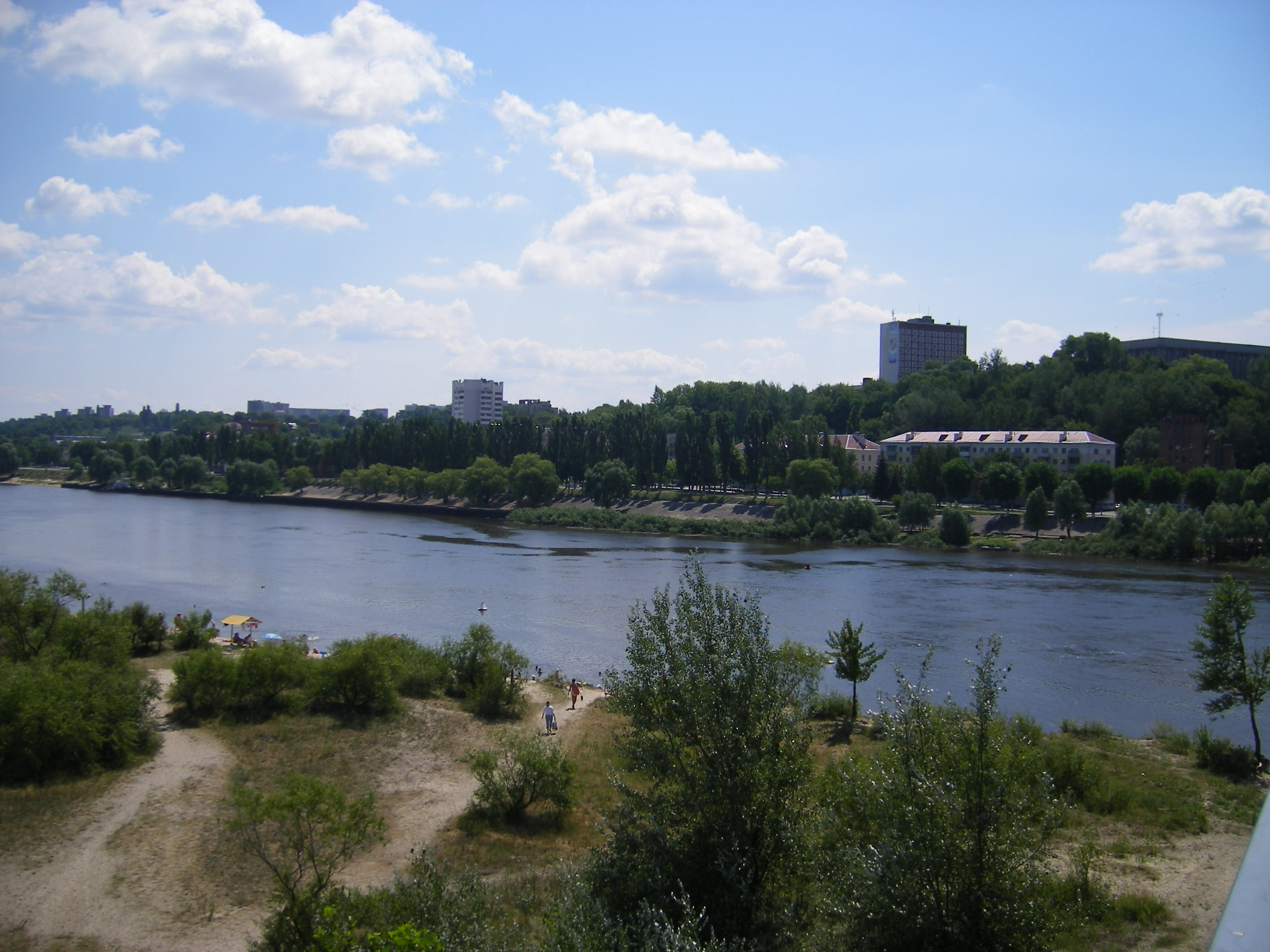
The Pripyat at Mazyr, Belarus

== Bibliography ==
- (in Russian, English and Polish) Ye.N.Meshechko, A.A.Gorbatsky (2005) Belarusian Polesye: Tourist Transeuropean Water Mains, Minsk, Four Quarters,
- (in Belarusian, Russian and English) T.A.Khvagina (2005) POLESYE from the Bug to the Ubort, Minsk Vysheysha shkola, ISBN 985-06-1153-7.
