= New Cave Transfiguration Monastery =

Former Orthodox monastery in Belarus

- Новапячэрскі Дзяцелавіцкі Праабражэнскі манастыр
- The monastery in a drawing of 1769–1770
- Interactive map of New Cave Transfiguration Monastery

Monastery information
- Order: Eastern Orthodox
- Established: 1622–1625
- Disestablished: 1855

People
- Founder: Konstanty Dołmat

Site
- Location: Dziatlavičy, Luninyets district, Brest region, Belarus

The New Cave Transfiguration Monastery (Belarusian: Новапячэрскі Дзяцелавіцкі Праабражэнскі манастыр; Russian: Новопечерский Дятловичский Преображенский мужской монастырь), also known as the Dziatlavičy Monastery, was an Eastern Orthodox men's monastery that existed from 1622 to 1855 in the village of Dziatlavičy (historically Dziatsielavičy) on the Tsna river, in present-day Luninyets district, Belarus. Founded through a donation by the nobleman Konstanty Dołmat as a dependency of the Kyiv Pechersk Lavra, it belonged to the Lavra until 1786 and then to the eparchy of Minsk. It owned the villages of Dziatlavičy, Luninyets and Mialiasnica, and at the end of the 18th century was regarded as the richest monastery of its eparchy. After its closure in 1855 its Church of the Transfiguration became a parish church.

== History ==
=== Foundation ===
The childless nobleman Konstanty Dołmat, an adherent of Orthodoxy who had acquired Dziatlavičy in 1618, donated his estates — Dziatlavičy, Luninyets and Mialiasnica — to the village's Church of the Transfiguration on condition that monks of the Kyiv Pechersk Lavra found a men's monastery there. According to the preface to the Lavra's 1624 edition of the homilies of John Chrysostom on the Acts of the Apostles, Dołmat in his will charged the archimandrite of the Lavra, Yelisey Pletenetsky, with founding a cenobitic monastery at Dziatlavičy, peopling it with Orthodox monks and appointing a hegumen, and placed the monastery in perpetuity under the Lavra, which was a stauropegion of the Patriarch of Constantinople. According to the historian Antoni Mironowicz, the monastery had already been founded in 1560 by Prince Konstanty Ostrogski, was closed for several years after the Union of Brest, and was revived in 1622 thanks to Dołmat. According to A. I. Milovidov, Ostrogski founded the monastery with a hospital in 1570. The monastery was built between 1622 and 1625; the name "New Cave" (Novapiačerski) reflected its foundation by monks of the Kyiv Cave (Pechersk) Lavra. The Słownik geograficzny Królestwa Polskiego dates the foundation to 1622.

=== 17th century ===
In 1627, after the death of the archimandrite of the Kyiv Pechersk Lavra, Zacharias Kopystensky, one of the candidates to succeed him was his relative, Vasily Kopystensky, hegumen of Dziatlavičy; Peter Mohyla was eventually elected.

In 1645 the monastery became involved in a boundary dispute with Count Tarnowski, the owner of Kazhan-Haradok. A meeting between the hegumen and the count was postponed because Tarnowski had been elected envoy to the Sejm in Warsaw; the court bailiff of Pinsk district announced this by sticking a notice, before witnesses, into the main entrance gate of the monastery. The outcome of the dispute is unknown.

In 1647 a complaint was entered in the Pinsk court books against the Vilnius burgher Fakenda, the tenant of Kazhan-Haradok, who had sent a party of about 100 mounted boyars and servitors armed with weapons, scythes, bardiches and pitchforks onto the monastery's fields. In the tracts of Mantsau Dubok and Tabarova Niva the monks had sown 13 barrels of buckwheat "to feed the poor of the monastery hospital"; the crop was trampled by horses, mown and beaten down. In the absence of the superior the complaint was filed by a monastery official, Hladki, "steward of Dziatlavičy and Lulinets".

Feodosy Vasilevich, archimandrite of the Slutsk monastery and at the same time hegumen of Dziatlavičy, took the village of Lunin in pledge for 50,000 złoty from Mikołaj Drucki-Lubecki and his wife Krystyna Stetkiewicz; a dispute over the terms of the pledge that began in 1668 was still going on in 1678, when neither party was alive any longer. After Vasilevich's death, King John III Sobieski on 22 June 1678 placed the Dziatlavičy monastery, together with the estates of Dziatlavičy, Lulinets and others, under the administration of Józef Szumlański, Bishop of Lviv; the Kyiv Pechersk Lavra later regained control of the monastery. During the wars of the mid-17th century the monastery's documents were taken to the Kyiv Pechersk Lavra, where they burned in 1667; in 1669 King Michał Korybut Wiśniowiecki confirmed the Lavra's rights to Dziatlavičy and Luninyets. In practice, however, the monastery came under the control of the Slutsk monastery, headed by Vasilevich; this probably explains the armed raid on Dziatlavičy and Luninyets in 1670 by the archimandrite of the Kyiv Pechersk Lavra, Innocent Gizel, which caused damage worth 4,000 złoty. The court nevertheless sided with Vasilevich: on 22 August 1670 the Lithuanian Tribunal, acting on a complaint by Vasilevich, who styled himself archimandrite of Slutsk and hegumen of Dziatlavičy, sentenced Gizel and the Pechersk monks, among them the vicar Antoniy Radyvylovsky, in absentia to banishment and to payment of 4,000 złoty for the violent raid on the monastery and the Lulinets manor. In 1678 Vasilevich, who had died in Lublin, was buried at the monastery by the Greek metropolitan Makarios Ligaridis.

Around 1680 the hegumen of the monastery was Serapion Polkhovsky, later archimandrite of Slutsk.

=== 18th century (to 1786) ===
Monasteries at that time served as rallying points for the Orthodox population, and serfs fleeing their landlords often sought refuge in them. In 1702 two runaway families, the Sosnowskis and the Dawidowiczes, from the village of Navasady (which a certain Schmidt had received from the Navahrudak voivode Niesiołowski) were found at the monastery; the voivode's agent Michał Winkiewicz gave the hegumen a receipt stating that Schmidt had taken the families back, together with all their movable property, without hindrance.

In 1723 hegumen Meletius sent two hieromonks with novices to the protopopy of Davyd-Haradok to inspect the conduct of the rural clergy and to collect dues.

In the archives of the Kyiv Pechersk Lavra the monastery is described as a "foreign dependency"; in 1717 its hegumen Innokenty Zhdanovich was instructed by the metropolitan to inspect the foreign churches of the Kyiv eparchy. In 1732 hegumen Vasily reported to the Pechersk archimandrite Roman Kopa that the monastery had been robbed by confederates. In 1735–1736 hegumen Gedeon Oniskevich was sent to translate and compile law books: hieromonks of the Lavra, including Oniskevich, took part in the commission for the codification of Ukrainian law. In 1741 the vicar, hieromonk Silvestr, gave explanations about the management of the estate during the hegumen's absence and an attack by Polish confederates; in 1742 the monks and the subjects of Luninyets and Dziatlavičy complained of Oniskevich's abuses, and in 1746–1747 he was in Warsaw assisting the Slutsk archimandrite Iosif Oransky, who was working on a commission on the grievances of the Orthodox.

Hegumen Ioannikios, who took charge in May 1747, immediately went to court against neighbouring landowners. A year later he complained to the Most Holy Synod that the monastery's land case against the landowner Dołmat — a Catholic and a distant descendant of the founder through one branch of the family — who had seized monastery lands, had been dragging on for 17 years. The hegumen even travelled to Warsaw, but the Minsk tribunal postponed the case indefinitely and forbade appeals to other courts on pain of the monastery losing all its possessions. In 1748 the Kazhan-Haradok nobleman Szczyt seized a large part of the monastery's fields, hayfields and fisheries, and that autumn his serfs, on his orders, ambushed the hegumen's convoy on a forest road as it travelled to Kyiv on monastery business, robbed it and beat his companions; nobody was punished. Already in 1742 the Lithuanian Tribunal had issued a decree on the monastery's land dispute with Stanisław Dołmat. In 1756 the Pinsk brotherhood complained to Metropolitan Timothy Shcherbatsky that the hegumen of the Pinsk Epiphany Monastery, Kirill Stefanovich, had been forced by the pressure of the Brest hegumen Spiridon Grinevetsky to withdraw to the Dziatlavičy monastery; in 1757 Grinevetsky himself complained to the metropolitan that the Dziatlavičy hegumen Dionisy Voronovsky, contrary to a decree, was receiving monks who had fled from the Brest monastery and admitting them to serve. The archives of the Holy Synod hold a complaint of 1762 by the princes Drucki-Lubecki about a raid by the Dziatlavičy monks on their lands. Land disputes with neighbours continued throughout the century: the inventory of the Lavra archive lists correspondence between the archimandrites and the hegumens about disputes with the local nobility (1729–1773), files on disputes with Szczytowa and Prince Lubecki (1776–1782), and a decree of 5 December 1778 delimiting the monastery's lands from those of neighbouring landowners. In 1763 the monastery's subjects were forbidden to baptise the children of Uniate relatives; in 1764 Hegumen Dorofey travelled to Warsaw to obtain confirmation of the monastery's land rights from the new king, and in 1769 the Lavra sent a complete set of the Menologion (Chetyi-Minei) to be read in the refectory.

In December 1767 the spiritual council of the Kyiv Pechersk Lavra appointed the hieromonk Feoktist Yavorsky hegumen in place of Ruf; he reached the monastery on 13 January 1768. In just over two years he had a new bell tower built, enclosed the monastery with a square wooden wall with four corner towers and a gateway, had a moat dug round it from the Tsna and laid a bridge 220 ells long on oak piles across the marsh; an inn and a small brickworks were set up in the village, and on the site of the old Transfiguration church in the village cemetery, which had burned down, the villagers built a wooden chapel on his orders. After complaints from peasants, whom the hegumen burdened with dues and beat, and following a synodal decree of 1768 that only "native Little Russians" were to be appointed hegumens of monasteries abroad, Feoktist was replaced by the hieromonk Savvaty on 21 May 1770.

According to a register of 1768 the monastery belonged to the Kyiv eparchy, and until 1786 it was in the possession of the Kyiv Pechersk Lavra as one of its nine dependent monasteries; after the secularisation of 1786 it was transferred to the eparchy of Minsk.

=== In the eparchy of Minsk (1786–1812) ===
At the end of 1786 a decree of the Synod placed the monastery under Bishop Viktor Sadkovsky of Pereiaslav, coadjutor of the Kyiv metropolis and head of the Orthodox Church in the Polish–Lithuanian Commonwealth; the bishop received the decree on 4 January 1787. When the eparchy of Minsk was created in 1793, Viktor became its bishop.

Hegumen Meletius Buvaila-Lesnitsky (Bugajło-Leśnicki) was one of the ten authors of the project for the organisation of the Orthodox Church in the Polish–Lithuanian Commonwealth prepared by the General Congregation of the Orthodox clergy in Pinsk (1791); the Sejm approved it by a law of 21 May 1792.

The monastery was regarded as one of the foremost in the Minsk eparchy, and its superiorship was prestigious and lucrative. On 11 November 1792 hegumen Kiprian Ostrovsky was appointed to "the richest monastery of the eparchy" after the death of the previous superior, Meletius; in 1794 the Synod assigned archimandrite Varlaam, assistant to the bishop of Minsk, to Dziatlavičy, calling it "the only rich one among many impoverished" monasteries. Bishop Victor (Sadkovsky) reported to the Synod that the monastery earned up to 2,000 roubles a year from the sale of spirits, fish from its lakes, livestock and timber. In 1793 the hegumen of Dziatlavičy was Protasy, who was at the same time hegumen of the Pinsk Epiphany Monastery and cathedral vicar. In 1798, after the Pinsk Epiphany Monastery had burned to the ground, its monks were transferred to Dziatlavičy.

This did not spare it a financial scandal, however: after taking over the Minsk eparchy, Archbishop Iov (Potemkin) transferred the richest of its monasteries to his personal use. He removed the monastery's two hegumens from management (though they formally kept their posts) and ran it through the steward, hierodeacon Mina, and a former "equerry", the Hungarian Ivan Martynovich, who concluded leases on their own authority; the inn went to a tenant who long refused to return it and then absconded without paying his debt. Iov allowed the monastery forest to be felled and sold, tar and turpentine to be produced and fish to be caught in the monastery lakes, and lent monastery money to landowners at interest, much of which was never recovered. After numerous complaints he was removed from the eparchy and ordered to return 5,000 roubles to the monastery treasury. After his departure the monastery recovered part of its loans and had free capital of 9,000 roubles.

=== Decline and closure (1812–1855) ===
During the war of 1812 the monastery sheltered plundered residents and treated wounded Russian soldiers. On 7 July 1812 the French entered Slutsk and ransacked the rich library of the Slutsk theological seminary; the surviving books, which had been in the hands of teachers and students, were collected by the student F. Smolich and secretly taken to the Dziatlavičy monastery, to his brother, the priest I. Smolich.

Even before the war the monastery, which was attached to the Slutsk Holy Trinity Monastery, had for several years supplied the Slutsk seminary with food and sometimes money. In March 1812, considering the seminary's request for more support, the eparchy cited the will of the founder, Konstanty Dołmat, under which the monastery's income was to maintain "12 monks, 12 widows and 12 orphans"; since the monastery then had only two hieromonks and one secular priest and no monks, its surplus income was assigned to the seminary. The monastery provided rye, groats, meat, fish, butter, lard, flour, millet, peas, eggs, cheese and 14 buckets of spirits a year. After the war the seminary hoped to borrow money from the monastery, but in March 1813 the rector reported to the Synod that "no free sum was found in the Dziatlavičy monastery". In November 1814 the Minsk ecclesiastical consistory proposed to the Synod that the seminary be moved to Minsk, that the monastery's rental income (1,100 silver roubles a year) be transferred to it, and that the monastery henceforth be called a "school" monastery with the seminary rector as its superior; the plan was not carried out. An inventory of 1814 recorded 59 head of cattle, 20 sheep, 9 goats, 38 pigs, 40 fowl and 6 horses; because of an epidemic and livestock losses, the vicar, hegumen Ioasaf, reported that the monastery could not supply beef, mutton, butter or eggs. Although the monastery was obliged to supply the seminary until 1815, reduced deliveries continued until 1817, and in 1818 the Minsk theological seminary was granted the right to receive "raw produce for teachers and pupils" from the monastery.

The monastery became steadily poorer: its buildings and church needed major repairs, and it had no monks at all. In 1826 it was removed from archimandrite administration and became self-governing. From 1826 to 1836 its superior was Archimandrite Markian (Platonovich), formerly a hieromonk of this monastery and a teacher at the Slutsk seminary; under him a tavern, a mill and an ice house with a granary were built and an orchard laid out, and he treated sick monastery peasants with his own medicines. In 1832 the consistory forbade him to read the Epistle and the Gospel in the services in Church Slavonic and Russian side by side. After his death the monastery was governed by Archimandrites Palladius (1836), Feofan (1837) and Iov (1838–1842). In 1842, when its estates had 1,121 peasant souls of both sexes, it was attached to the Pinsk Epiphany Monastery. In 1850 the 10,000 silver roubles bequeathed by Countess Anna Orlova-Chesmenskaya to the former Dziatlavičy Transfiguration and Slutsk St Elijah monasteries were assigned to the Pinsk St Barbara Convent. Part of the library went to the Slutsk Holy Trinity Monastery and the seminary, part of the archive to the Pinsk Epiphany Monastery and to the archive of the Minsk ecclesiastical consistory, and part of the church plate was left to the Dziatlavičy parish church. In 1848 Luninyets became state property, and Dziatlavičy did so at about the same time.

Dziatlavičy and the men's monastery on Vietinghoff's topographic map of Minsk Governorate (1846)

By a decree of the Synod of 31 December 1854 (with imperial approval), the supernumerary Dziatlavičy monastery was abolished: its church and plate became a parish church, whose parish was to include the village of Dziatlavičy (previously in the Lulinets parish) and the villages of Kupovshchina (now Kupoŭcy) and Boroviki (now Baraŭcy), and the dilapidated monastery buildings were given over to house the clergy. The monastery, which had existed for 233 years, was closed in 1855.

== Estates and economy ==
According to the History of the Minsk Eparchy, based on old documents, the monastery owned the village of Dziatlavičy, with 304 male and 299 female souls (603 in all), and the village of Mialiasnica, with 24 male and 16 female souls (40 in all). On 12 March 1676 King John III Sobieski confirmed that the villages donated by Konstanty Dołmat still belonged to the monastery, which held 808 valoka of land.

In 1756–1759 and 1769 the subjects of Luninyets and Dziatlavičy complained to the Lavra about the burden of corvée and the high price of spirits in the taverns.

After the region was annexed by the Russian Empire, Dziatlavičy and Luninyets remained in the monastery's possession. To replenish its treasury the monastery leased out individual buildings and entire villages. According to a report of 1798, the inn and mill at Dziatlavičy were leased for 200 roubles a year and the villages of Luninyets and Mialiasnica for 800 roubles; in the early 19th century the rent for the two villages rose to 900 and then to 1,100 roubles. Until 1812 the monastery received 600 silver roubles a year for the inn alone. It also had a sawmill, a smithy and an apiary; its capital amounted to 500 roubles in 1798, more than 1,000 by 1805 and more than 4,500 by 1811. The inhabitants of Dziatlavičy paid the monastery no money dues but took turns cultivating its arable land and hayfields. In 1795 Dziatlavičy had 64 households and a sawmill.

== Superiors ==
The list is incomplete; it is compiled from mentions in documents, and the years are those of appointment or mention.

Years	Superior	Notes	Source
1627	Vasily Kopystensky	relative of Archimandrite Zacharias Kopystensky; candidate to succeed him	
mentioned 1670	Feodosy Vasilevich	also archimandrite of Slutsk; died 1678	
c. 1680	Serapion Polkhovsky	later archimandrite of Slutsk	
from 1705	Modest Ilinitsky		
1711	Gedeon Ozharkovsky	letter of appointment	
from 1717	Innokenty Zhdanovich		
from 1723	Meletius		
1725	Manassiya		
before 1732	Gavriil		
from 1732	Vasily		
1735–1747	Gedeon Oniskevich		
1738	Varnava Starzhitsky	letter of appointment from Archimandrite Ilarion Negrebetsky of the Lavra, 10 July 1738	
from 1743	Polikarp		
from 1747	Iustin Zviraka	appointed to succeed Gedeon; mentioned in 1750; later a senior elder (sobornyi starets) of the Kyiv Pechersk Lavra	
from May 1747	Ioanniky	according to Pamiac	
1748	Ioasaf Siemetsky	travelled to Warsaw to assist Archimandrite Iosif Oransky of Slutsk; later archimandrite of the Moscow Epiphany Monastery	
from 1753	Dionisy Voronovsky	compiler of the 1753 synodikon; in 1755–1757 received monks who had fled from the Brest monastery; died 1758	
from 1758	Iona		
1760s	Dorofey		
before 1767	Ruf Dunaevsky	the church was adorned with icons under him in 1766	
1768–1770	Feoktist Yavorsky	appointed 19 December 1767, replaced 21 May 1770; 1768–1769 in the TsDIAK inventory	
from 1770	Savvaty	mentioned in 1772	
1775–1792	Meletius Buvaila-Lesnitsky	mentioned in 1777 in the TsDIAK inventory; died 1792	
from 1792	Kiprian Ostrovsky	appointed 11 November 1792	
1793	Protasy	also hegumen of the Pinsk Epiphany Monastery and cathedral vicar	
from 1794	Archimandrite Varlaam	assistant to the bishop of Minsk	
1800	Ioasaf	mentioned in the synodikon	
1814	Ioasaf	vicar	
1823	Archimandrite Markian (Platonovich)	mentioned in the synodikon; superior until 1836	
1836	Archimandrite Palladius		
1837	Archimandrite Feofan		
1838–1842	Archimandrite Iov	former vicar of the Pinsk Epiphany Monastery	

== Buildings and parish church ==
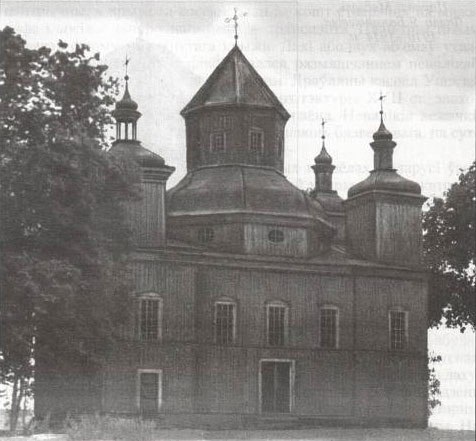
The wooden Church of the Transfiguration, 1944–1949

In 1752–1763 new churches were built in the monastery and in the village, and in 1769–1785 a refectory church dedicated to Saints Anthony and Theodosius of the Caves; in 1775 the Church of the Nativity of the Theotokos in Dziatlavičy was being restored after a fire. According to an inventory of 13 July 1770, the centre of the monastery was occupied by a new three-domed wooden church roofed with shingles and with two altars; there was also a refectory church dedicated to Saints Anthony and Theodosius of the Caves. In 1823 a wooden Church of the Transfiguration was built at the monastery's expense.

After the monastery was closed, its church became the parish church of Dziatlavičy. According to data published in 1864, the wooden Church of the Transfiguration, built in 1823 at the expense of the former monastery, was then registered as a chapel-of-ease of the Church of the Exaltation of the Cross of a neighbouring parish and had more than 33 desyatinas of farmstead, arable and hay land. In 1879 it was described as a five-domed cruciform building with two altars, dedicated to the Transfiguration and to Saint Nicholas, and a six-tier iconostasis of 50 icons; under the church were vaults with coffins, and a bell tower stood separately. The church was repaired in 1870–1871. An inscription on its altar cross recorded that the earlier church had been built "through the efforts of the former hegumens and at the expense of this holy cloister" and adorned with icons under Hegumen Ruf Dunaevsky on 13 July 1766. The church plate included a silver chalice with paten and asterisk which, according to its inscription, had been donated in 1763 to the cathedral church of the Kyiv Pechersk Lavra by Iezekiil Bogodukhovsky, a hieromonk of the Lavra; the vestry also held a manuscript Gospel in a velvet binding of unknown date and authorship. From 1930 the rector of the church was Vasily Kharitonchik; on 8 July 1944, despite the priest's resistance, German soldiers broke the lock off the church and plundered its property. In the 1960s (the 1970s according to another source) its central dome was struck by lightning and collapsed into the building; the church was not restored, and a new church of sand-lime brick was built on the site in 2003.

== Culture ==
The monastery was a cultural and educational centre of Polesia. It had a large library of old manuscripts and printed books, a bookbinding workshop, workshops for repairing and renewing church plate, an icon-painting workshop and a hospital in which the monks treated not only their brethren but also people from the surrounding villages with folk remedies. According to the property inventory of 1765, the monastery library held 82 books; the inventory of 1837 lists 199 books. At that time the monastery also kept an archive of 1,067 documents in 17 bundles. Among the monks were well-educated men: the hieromonks Roman (from 1796) and Markian (from 1809) were invited to teach at the Minsk theological seminary.

A synodikon of the monastery dated December 1753 and compiled "by the own hand" of hieromonk Dionisy Voronovsky, then its superior, has survived. Its 41 leaves list names for commemoration: patriarchs, tsars and tsaritsas, the founder's Dołmat family, metropolitans, archimandrites and bishops, as well as the hegumens and vicars of the monastery — Vasily Pyalkevich, Pavel Usovich, Gedeon Ozharkovsky, Modest Ilnitsky, Silvestr Volkovich, Alipy Osmanetsky, Leonty Bunkevich, Ioanniky Yurkevich, Iustin Zveraki, Innokenty Butkevich, Ruf Dunaevsky, Iustin Vasilevich, Manassiya Pogrebensky, Siluan Ozersky and Dorofey Isaevich. Entries continued to be added until the mid-19th century, naming hegumen M. Buvaila (1775), confessor Meletius (1766), hegumen Feoktist Yavorsky (1768), Kiprian Ostrovsky (1792), Ioasaf (1800), archimandrite Markian (1823) and the churchwardens Dashkevich and Yatsynich; the last entry commemorates Countess Anna Orlova-Chesmenskaya for donating 5,000 roubles to the Pinsk Epiphany Monastery.
