= Dobraya Volya, Luninyets District =

Village in Luninyets district, Brest region, Belarus

Dobraya Volya Добрая Воля
- Village
- Location within Belarus
- Coordinates: 52°21′05″N 26°54′50″E
- Country: Belarus
- Region: Brest region
- District: Luninyets district
- Selsoviet: Vulka

Population (2019)
  - Total: 13
- Time zone: UTC+3 (FET)
- Postal code: 225666

Dobraya Volya (Belarusian: Добрая Воля; Russian: Добрая Воля; Polish: Dobra Wola) is a village in Luninyets district, Brest region, Belarus. It belongs to the Vulka selsoviet. It originated in the 1920s as a colony of farmsteads on the land of the parcelled-out Wólka Brodnicka estate. The village was heavily contaminated after the Chernobyl disaster; in 1990 most of its inhabitants were resettled to Dubauka, and only a few families remained.

== Geography ==
Dobraya Volya lies 25 kilometres (16 mi) north-east of Luninyets. A local road from Dzyatlavichy to Mizhlessie passes through the village, which has a single street, Partyzanskaya Street.

== History ==
=== Polish period ===
Site of the future colony on the Russian one-verst map (late 19th – early 20th century): forest

Dobraya Volya on the Polish tactical map of 1934

The settlement grew out of farmsteads (colonies) on plots sold off by the Wólka Brodnicka estate in the gmina of Łuniniec, Łuniniec County, Polesie Voivodeship, Poland. The estate was parcelled out in 1925–1928. According to the Polish Supreme Audit Office, the estate had belonged to a Soviet citizen, Jerzy Dawydow, and was sold in 1925 through an intermediary to Władysław Daab; the Office noted that the sale had been approved without documents proving the seller's title. In December 1929 Daab sold the estate to Jerzy Koszarski, but the transfer was not entered in the land register because debt enforcement had already begun.

According to the newspaper Dzień Dobry (no. 103, 1935), whose report was reprinted by the Warsaw socialist daily Robotnik, this was a "wild" parcellation: a group of timber merchants had fictitiously bought this forest estate, more than 6,000 ha, which was encumbered with debts to the State Treasury. A Catholic prelate, Dionizy Bączkowski, received a power of attorney from them and, contrary to its terms, concluded contracts for the sale of plots on his own account. 172 Polish settler families paid about 152,000 złoty in advances, which were lost. After settling on the plots they began clearing them, but the administrative and forestry authorities declared this logging and clearing illegal. An investigation exposed the affair: the settlers, without livestock, equipment or money, were left in a desperate situation, and the organiser was prosecuted. In a reply published in May 1935, Bączkowski stated that he had acted with the owner's authorisation and the knowledge of the authorities, had set up a chapel for the Catholic colonists, and that the settlers themselves had named their colony Dobra Wola ("Good Will").

According to a 1931 court notice of the public auction of the Wólka Brodnicka estate, 186 forest plots totalling 4,151 ha and 118 meadow plots (935 ha) had by then been handed over to buyers, and 88 buyers had put up buildings on them. Further auctions were scheduled in 1934 and 1935, and in June 1939 the estate was still registered to Koszarski, for whom debt-arrangement proceedings were then opened. In a lawsuit over the buyers' title to their plots, appeals by the creditor bank were dismissed by the Court of Appeal in Wilno (1937) and the Supreme Court of Poland (1938).

Order of the Łuniniec county starost establishing the gromada "Chutory Dobra Wola" (Poleski Dziennik Wojewódzki, 1929)

By an order of the Łuniniec county starost of 17 January 1929, issued at the colonists' request, the colonies on the former estate land were separated from the gromada of the village of Wólka and formed a separate rural gromada, "Chutory Dobra Wola" ("Dobra Wola farmsteads"). In 1931 the colony had a one-class public elementary school (szkoła powszechna). On 22 April 1931 the Voivode of Polesie registered the association "Kółko Rolnicze w Dobrej Woli" (Agricultural Circle in Dobra Wola). In 1933 a unit of the paramilitary Riflemen's Association existed in Dobra Wola. On the 1934 Polish tactical map, Dobra Wola appears as a dispersed settlement of farmsteads with 115 houses. When the rural gminas of Polesie Voivodeship were divided into gromadas in 1935, the gromada of Dobra Wola in the gmina of Łuniniec comprised the Dobra Wola farmsteads and the Wólka Brodnicka manor farm. In 1936 the Polska Macierz Szkolna (Polish School Society) opened a private elementary school in the village, attended by 56 children in the 1936/37 school year. In 1939 the village had 796 inhabitants.

=== 1939–1941 ===
From late 1939 the village was part of the Byelorussian SSR; from 15 January 1940 it belonged to the Vulka selsoviet of Luninyets district, Pinsk Region. On 10 February 1940 some of the colony's Polish families were deported by the Soviet authorities to special settlements in Arkhangelsk Oblast. The Polish Indeks Represjonowanych database lists 329 people born in Dobra Wola, of whom at least 29 died in exile in 1940–1941; most of those released under the 1941 amnesty were sent to the Kazakh SSR, and some left the USSR with Anders' Army in 1942. Lists of civilians evacuated from the USSR to Iran, published in 1942 by the Polish émigré newspaper Polska Walcząca, include several people born in Dobra Wola in 1931–1935.

=== Second World War ===
Certificate of M. Kravchuk, commandant of Dobraya Volya, issued by the Kirov partisan detachment on 3 February 1943

According to a partisan leaflet, during the German occupation the Germans plundered the peasants of Dzyatlavichy, Bastyn, Dobraya Volya and other villages and took their livestock; partisans attacked a convoy near Luninyets and returned 155 head of cattle to the peasants.

In early 1943 the village lay in a zone liberated by the partisans: according to a report by the command of the Kirov partisan detachment dated 3 February 1943, a partisan commandant's office was set up in Dobraya Volya, as in Bastyn and Dzyatlavichy with their surrounding khutors, with Mikhail Kravchuk appointed commandant.

On 16 March 1943 the village was burned and 59 of its inhabitants were killed. According to the act of the Luninyets district commission of the Extraordinary State Commission of 10 April 1945, in spring 1943, 73 people were shot in the village and 98 were burned alive. An obelisk commemorates the victims, and some of the graves are marked with wooden crosses. According to documents of the National Archives of the Republic of Belarus, the burning of Dobraya Volya was the work of a pseudo-partisan group led by Uladzimir Koval (nicknamed "Tsygan"), which operated in Luninyets district and had received its weapons from the gendarmerie in Luninyets.

Before the war, Mikhail Kravchuk, a partisan of the Kalinin detachment of the Kirov brigade of the Pinsk partisan formation, lived and worked in the village; he was killed on 23 September 1943 and buried in Bastyn. In December 1943 a liaison of the Kirov brigade was caught in an ambush between the villages of Kupautsy and Dobraya Volya and shot in Luninyets. In summer 1944, during Operation Bagration, the plan of the commander of the Pinsk partisan formation, Vasily Korzh, was to move the Kirov brigade to Dobraya Volya during the Red Army's advance on Luninyets.

Twenty-three inhabitants of the village were killed at the front. The village was rebuilt after the war.

=== Post-war period ===
From 8 January 1954 the village was part of Brest region. In Soviet times Dobraya Volya had only an elementary school; from 1970 to 1990 children from the village lived in the boarding school attached to the school in Vulka 2. In 2002 the village belonged to the Rassvet collective farm.

=== Chernobyl disaster ===
In the chronicle of events in the book Pamiać, Dobraya Volya is listed under 25 December 1986 among the villages where contaminated milk was found. The density of soil contamination with caesium-137 in the village reached 6 Ci/km². According to forecasts of radiation doses to the population, the dose in the village was estimated at 0.54 rem for 1988 (0.32 rem of it internal exposure) and at 42.51 rem for 1986–2060 (38.95 rem internal). Dobraya Volya was singled out as the village where the lifetime dose limit was expected to be exceeded, so protective measures were needed there first.

In May 1990 the inhabitants were told to move to Dubauka, a settlement built specially for resettled people; more than 300 inhabitants were entitled to resettlement. A few families stayed in the village. Since 2010 the village has been classified as an area of periodic radiation monitoring. In 2011 the district newspaper described Dobraya Volya as the most contaminated village in the district.

== Population ==
Year	Population	Note
1939	796	
1942 (1 January)	860	
1986	c. 230	topographic map
2002	29	16 households
2005	32	17 households
2009	21	census
2011	18	
2019 (1 January)	9	8 households
2019	13	census
