= Tsna =

Tsna or TSNA may refer to:

- Tsna (Moksha), a river in Tambov Oblast and Ryazan Oblast, tributary of the Moksha (Oka basin)
- Tsna (Tver Oblast), a river in Tver Oblast, Msta basin
- Tsna (Pripyat) a tributary of the Pripyat in Belarus
- Tsna (Oka), a river in Moscow Oblast, tributary of the Oka
- Tobacco-specific nitrosamines
