= Dzyatlavichy, Luninyets District =

Agrotown in Brest Region, Belarus

Dziatlavičy Дзятлавічы (Belarusian) Дятловичи (Russian)
- Agrotown
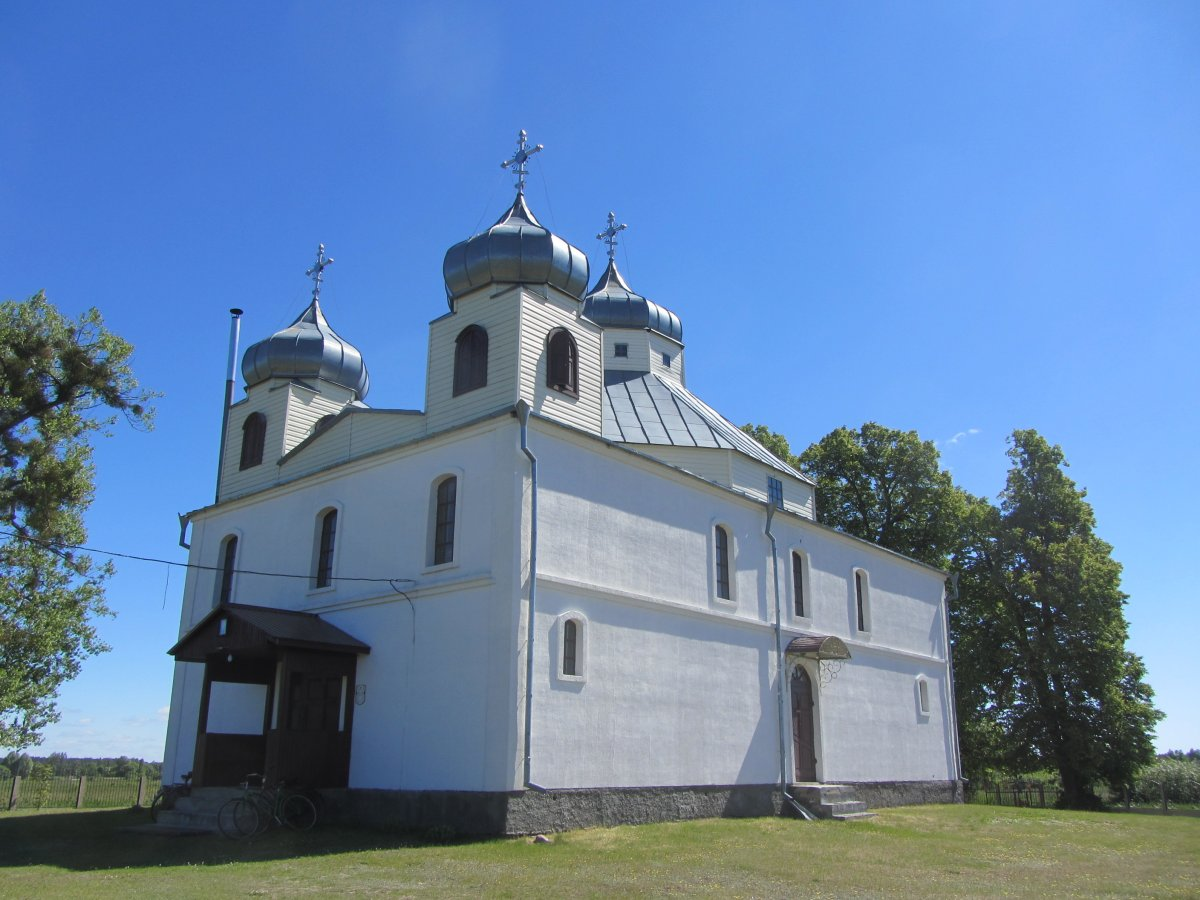
- Transfiguration Church in Dziatlavičy

- Location within Belarus
- Coordinates: 52°20′31″N 26°49′15″E
- Country: Belarus
- Region: Brest Region
- District: Luninyets District
- Selsoviet: Dziatlavičy Selsoviet
- First mentioned: 1566

Population (2019)
  - Total: 2,030
- Time zone: UTC+3 (MSK)
- Postal code: 225653
- Area code: +375 1647

Dziatlavičy (Belarusian: Дзятлавічы; Russian: Дятловичи, Dyatlovichi) is an agrotown in Luninyets District, Brest Region, Belarus. It is the administrative centre of the Dziatlavičy selsoviet and the largest rural settlement in Luninyets District, with a population of 2,030 at the 2019 census.

== Etymology ==
In early printed sources the settlement's name appears as Dyatelovichy. It is thought to derive from the local word for wild white clover, which still grows abundantly around the village; the name later evolved into Dziatlavičy. According to a local legend recorded in 1935, the village was earlier called Dzięciołowicze, after the many woodpeckers (Polish: dzięcioł) said to have lived in the surrounding forests.

== Geography ==
Dziatlavičy (224 households) on the right bank of the Tsna and the Dziatlavičy khutors (42 households) on the left bank, on a Russian one-verst military topographic map

Dziatlavičy lies 13 km north of the town of Luninyets on the Tsna River, a left tributary of the Pripyat. A hydrological gauging station on the Tsna operates in the village, about 46 km from the river's mouth.

Historically the village lay on the right bank of the Tsna. On the left bank stood the Dziatlavičy farmsteads (khutors): 42 households on a Russian topographic map of the late 19th – early 20th century and 64 houses on a Polish topographic map of the 1930s. They later became part of the village, which now extends along both banks of the river.

The Tsna is one of the most swampy rivers of the Pripyat Polesia. In the 1870s–1890s drainage works were carried out in its basin by the Western Land Reclamation Expedition: in 1879–1890 the Luninyets Canal was joined to an old, cleared canal 15 versts long running across the peasant fields of the Dziatlavičy state estate, and drainage there produced good results, draining forests and peasant land. A river gauge station was opened in the village in 1879, and in 1897 a station of the Western Land Reclamation Expedition was set up there. The opening of the railway station (1884) and the land reclamation works fostered the rapid growth of the village.

Clay beds of considerable thickness have been found at a depth of about 20 m near Dziatlavičy; extracting them at that depth is considered unprofitable.

== Coat of arms ==
Coat of arms of Dziatlavičy

The coat of arms of Dziatlavičy was approved by Decree No. 659 of the President of the Republic of Belarus on 2 December 2008. It depicts a Varangian-style shield in blue, with a silver lily-shaped flower at the top and, below it, a silver cross adjoined by two joined triangles representing a river. These two triangles form the ancestral coat of arms of the Dolmat family, known as "Rozmiar" (Belarusian: «Размер»), included in honour of the monastery's founder, Konstanty Dolmat. The coat of arms was designed by T. V. Konopatskaya and drawn by V. A. Lyakhor; it was registered in the State Heraldic Register of the Republic of Belarus on 23 January 2009 under No. B-148. The blue field and a Dortmann's lobelia flower, the symbol of Luninyets, indicate the village's administrative subordination to the district; together with the neighbouring village of Lunin, Dziatlavičy is one of only two localities in the district (besides the district centre) to have its own coat of arms, underscoring the historical ties between these settlements and Luninyets.

== History ==
Human bones found near the village are listed among the region's Iron Age sites. A description of the parish from 1879 mentions a hill near the village "on which human bones are uncovered in great numbers", and a raised spot in the village itself where an icon and three crosses stood under a canopy; old residents regarded both places as former cemeteries.

=== Grand Duchy of Lithuania and Polish–Lithuanian Commonwealth ===
Dziatlavičy is first recorded in 1566, when Stanisław Andreyevich Davoyna, a cousin of the Voivode of Polotsk Stanisław Davoyna, who had been taken prisoner by Muscovy, sold the village of Dyatelovichy on his relative's behalf to the nobleman Pavel Podorewski. In 1567 the owner was obliged to furnish mounted soldiers to the army of the Grand Duchy of Lithuania, which the authors of the regional memorial book Pamiać estimate corresponded to about 40 peasant households. It was the first noble estate in the Luninyets area that was not an appendage of a large magnate domain. In 1578, 1580 and 1581 Dyatelovichy was the manorial centre of an estate in Navahrudak County, owned by Mikalai Podorewski, with 60 tribute-paying peasant households; in 1588 it was a village of Navahrudak County owned by the same Mikalai Podorewski, and in 1599 a small town (miastečka). In 1604 the estate was divided between Anna Podorewska and her husband Krzysztof Kos on the one hand and her uncle Adam Podorewski on the other.

The Podorewski family subsequently sold Dyatelovichy to Jakub Kuncewicz, a relative of Barbara Naruszewicz, from whom he had acquired the neighbouring estate of Luninyets. In 1617 (according to other sources, in 1618) Jakub Kuncewicz and his son Mikalai sold both Luninyets and Dyatelovichy to Konstanty Dolmat. By 1620 the estate comprised 68 land units (valoka); of these, 6.5 stood vacant, while the remainder belonged to 5 noble and 58 peasant households. A distinctive feature of the estate was the unusually large size of individual peasant holdings, a full valoka rather than the more typical half.

The Dziatlavičy monastery in a drawing of 1769–1770

Konstanty Dolmat and his wife Anna, née Yurkovskaya, had no children; they bequeathed the villages of Dyatelovichy, Luninyets and Melyasnichu to the local Transfiguration church on condition that monks from the Kyiv Pechersk Lavra establish a men's monastery at Dyatelovichy, subordinate to the Patriarch of Constantinople and the Metropolitan of Kyiv. According to local tradition, Dolmat also stipulated that twelve monks should permanently care for no fewer than twelve orphans and provide assistance to twelve widows. Between 1622 and 1625 a wooden church dedicated to the Transfiguration was built on the monastery grounds, together with cells for the abbot and monks, a bakery, a granary, a storehouse and stables. Some authors date the founding of the monastery to the 1560s or 1570s and associate it with Prince Konstanty Ostrogski: according to A. I. Milovidov it was founded in 1570, according to Antoni Mironowicz in 1560; the surviving documents point to its founding in 1622 (see New Cave Transfiguration Monastery).

The New Cave Transfiguration Monastery became a centre of culture and education: it maintained a large library of early manuscripts and printed books, bookbinding and icon-painting workshops, and a "hospital" where the monks treated both their brethren and residents of neighbouring villages. Through the 17th and early 19th centuries the monastery supported itself by leasing out various buildings — an inn, a sawmill, a smithy, an apiary and, at times, entire villages.

In 1769, on the site of the old Transfiguration church in the cemetery opposite the village, which had burned down and where funerals had been held, the villagers built a wooden chapel on the orders of the hegumen Feoktist Yavorsky; an inn and a small brickworks were set up in the village at the same time. The monastery's inventory of 1770 lists 36 peasant households in the village.

=== Russian Empire ===
Dziatlavičy and the men's monastery on Vietinghoff's topographic map of Minsk Governorate (1846)

During the war of 1812 the monastery sheltered local residents who had been robbed and treated wounded Russian soldiers. After the war its economic activity gradually declined, though it continued to support neighbouring institutions, including the Sluck theological seminary, for some time. After 233 years, the monastery was closed in 1855.

From the late 1840s Dziatlavičy was a state-owned (crown) village.

According to the 1879 description, the Dziatlavičy parish also included the villages of Kupovtsy and Borovtsy and had 580 male and 520 female parishioners, mostly peasant farmers. The church had five bells (the largest weighing 25 poods 28 pounds), and its parish registers had been kept since 1812. There was no school in the parish at the time, and literacy was "barely noticeable".

According to statistical surveys, in the 1880s Dziatlavičy — then a former state-owned village of Kozhan-Haradok volost, Pinsk uyezd, Minsk Governorate, on the Tsna River — had 114 households and 736 residents, with an Orthodox church in operation. By 1909 the number of households had grown to 232, and the population to 1,705 — more than double.

Following the opening of the Baranavichy–Luninyets section of the Polesian Railway in December 1884, a station named Dziatlavičy was built about 1 km from the village, handling mainly timber and agricultural produce; a postal train and a mixed goods-and-passenger train each stopped there briefly. In the early 20th century the stationmaster was P. D. Chudinovich.

In the summer of 1913 an ethnographic expedition led by Isaak Serbov, which surveyed the northern part of Pinsk uyezd, stopped at Dziatlavičy; photographs taken in the village in 1913 are held by the Kunstkamera (Museum of Anthropology and Ethnography, collections I 1799 and I 1800, collector Jeŭdakim Ramanaŭ). Serbov later prepared an ethnographic essay, "Dyatlovtsy-poleshuki", on life along the upper Tsna; the manuscript, sent to the academician Aleksey Shakhmatov in 1917, has not been traced.

=== Civil war and Polish–Soviet War ===
During the Civil War and the Polish–Soviet War, Dziatlavičy station was part of the defences of the Luninyets railway junction: on 31 December 1918 the 2nd Battalion of the 152nd Regiment of the Red Army's 17th Rifle Division detrained there, and in March 1919 companies of the 145th and the 21st Roslavl regiments were stationed in Dziatlavičy. On 9 July 1919 units of the 1st Brigade of the 8th Rifle Division of the Red Army fought heavy battles with Polish forces near Dziatlavičy but were forced to withdraw. In mid-July 1920, according to Polish intelligence, units of the Red Army's Mozyr Group reached the line of the Tsna river and the railway near Dziatlavičy. On 20 July 1920 the Polish General Staff reported that a Red Army attack had been repulsed on the Tsna line near Dziatlavičy railway station; the Polish army's list of losses records a rifleman killed near Dziatlavičy on 19 July. According to Pamiać, on the same day the 508th Rifle Regiment of the 170th Brigade of the Red Army's 57th Rifle Division entered Dziatlavičy, and units of the 510th and 511th regiments then moved into the area of Dziatlavičy, Bastyn and Lyusina. Until July 1920 and again from October 1920 the village was occupied by Polish troops.

=== Interwar Poland ===
Dziatłowicze (300 houses) on the Polish 1:100,000 tactical map (1939 print)

Under the Treaty of Riga, Dziatlavičy was part of Poland from 1921 to 1939.

From 18 March 1921 the village belonged to the gmina of Kożangródek in Łuniniec County, and after that gmina was abolished in 1928, to the gmina of Łuniniec. The Polish census of 30 September 1921 recorded 300 houses and 1,814 inhabitants in the village together with the railway station (1,751 Orthodox, 33 Roman Catholics and 26 Jews by religion; 1,737 declared themselves Belarusians, 47 Poles and 22 Jews), and a brickworks with 3 houses and 35 inhabitants. A police station was set up in the village. In 1930 Dziatlavičy had 1,303 inhabitants, three timber-processing enterprises (with 36 workers in 1933), Szaraszewski's steam mill and Mojsza Łucki's mill. A cell of the Communist Party of Western Belarus was active from 1932. The State Police post in Dziatlavičy was abolished on 15 March 1932. A steam mill had operated in the village since 1923 (in 1924 it was owned by a partnership of B. Gimon, S. Polakiewicz and A. Słucki); in 1927 the limited liability company "Tartak w Dziatłowiczach" (sawmill and mill, share capital 20,000 złoty) was registered.

In 1932 the Łuniniec County Land Office began a land consolidation (komasacja) in Dziatlavičy, merging scattered strips of land into compact holdings (the decision of 26 October took effect on 29 November 1932). According to the wójt of the Łuniniec gmina, by 1937 the gmina had built a people's house in the village and a three-grade school building with a flat for the head teacher.

On 18 September 1939 units of the Red Army's 52nd Rifle Division entered the village; from the end of 1939 Dziatlavičy was part of the Byelorussian SSR, with 1,407 inhabitants. The Dziatlavičy village council (selsoviet) was established on 12 October 1940 as part of Luninyets District of Pinsk Region. On the eve of the German invasion in 1941 the village had 570 households and 2,250 inhabitants. In October 1939 the peasant Denis Afanasyevich Vasilyev was elected to the People's Assembly of Western Belarus for the Dziatlavičy constituency. A correspondents' office of the district newspaper was opened in the village. In 1939–1941 the forester K. I. Kulpa, the timber grader of the sawmill at Dziatlavičy station M. V. Korzun and the former village elder N. V. Kharitonovich were arrested and sentenced to eight years in labour camps; all were rehabilitated in 1989.

=== Second World War ===
According to an investigation report on Nazi crimes in Luninyets District quoted in the regional memorial book Pamiać, 33 people, including 12 women and 10 children, were shot in Dziatlavičy in July 1941.

According to the Yad Vashem names database, Jewish residents of the village were also killed in Dziatlavičy in 1941. In early March 1942 a ghetto was set up in Luninyets, into which the remaining Jews of the surrounding villages, including Dziatlavičy, were driven.

In June 1942, after a German railway guard was killed between Bastyn and Dziatlavičy, the occupiers announced that they would shoot 100 hostages, 50 from each village. On 29 June, 51 residents of Bastyn were shot at the level crossing near that village; in Dziatlavičy 19 hostages were shot. They were buried near the level crossing, where a memorial stele was erected in 1967.

The village had an underground Komsomol group led by Aleksandr Gopta; the village elder Aleksandr Bushyla helped the partisans and was shot in Pinsk in December 1942. Partisans repeatedly blew up German trains on the Luninyets–Dziatlavičy section of the railway. Before 1943 the occupiers set up a garrison in the village and blew up the station building. In May 1943 partisans hung a red flag on the village council building in occupied Dziatlavičy and mined the approaches to it. In summer 1943 an agitation and combat group of Komsomol partisans led by Svittsov, a member of the underground district Komsomol committee, operated around Dziatlavičy, Bastyn and Lobcha.

On 17 October 1943 a punitive detachment destroyed the village's farmsteads (khutors). According to Pamiać, the pretext was a partisan attack on a house in the Lesnye farmstead where German soldiers had gathered; a few days later the farmsteads were surrounded, residents were killed in their homes and the houses were set on fire. According to the investigation report, 148 people (including 51 women and 57 children) were burned and 68 (including 20 women and 14 children) were shot. The list of destroyed villages compiled from the database of the National Archives of the Republic of Belarus gives October 1943, 28 houses destroyed and 178 people killed for Dziatlavičy. Among those killed was Denis Vasilyev, a deputy of the People's Assembly of Western Belarus, together with his wife and seven children. The victims were buried 600 metres west of the village, beyond the Luninyets–Dziatlavičy railway line, where an obelisk was erected in 1967.

Vasily Kharitonchik, rector of the Transfiguration Church from 1930, conducted funerals for those killed and recorded the cause of death in the parish register as "shot by the Germans"; on 8 July 1944, despite the priest's resistance, German soldiers broke the lock off the church and plundered its property.

Dziatlavičy was liberated on 9 July 1944 by the 55th Rifle Division of the 61st Army. According to the memoirs of Fyodor Vinokurov, commander of the 117th Rifle Regiment of the 23rd Rifle Division, units of the regiment took Dziatlavičy on the same day and cut the Luninyets–Baranavichy railway. In all, 115 residents died fighting with the partisans, in the underground or at the front. More than 80 residents were deported to Germany for forced labour.

One street is named after Kirey Yarameyevich Vialesiuk (born 1913 in the village), from December 1942 a liaison of the partisan detachment "Za Rodinu" ("For the Motherland"), who was nominated for the Order of the Red Star.

=== Post-war period ===
After the Second World War, Dziatlavičy remained part of the Soviet Union; since 1991 it has been part of independent Belarus. In 1946 I. V. Korzun, a teacher at the Dziatlavičy school, was sentenced to ten years in labour camps (he was rehabilitated in 1971). Collectivisation in the village began in spring 1949: on 30 March a general meeting of residents decided to establish an agricultural artel, organised by the chairman of the village council, V. G. Kanonovich (for the collective farms see Polesie Experimental Station). In the 1960s the collective farm's households were connected to gas and electricity; in March 1969 the district newspaper reported that the gasification of the village had been completed. In 1970 an obelisk to villagers killed in the war was erected in the centre of the village. In the 1980s a new house of culture and a rural music school opened, and in 1984 a museum of folk art (more than 400 exhibits) was established at the secondary school. A kindergarten and an outpatient clinic opened in 1993.

==== Soviet–Afghan War ====
Viktar H. Kanapatski, a native of Dziatlavičy, was killed in the Soviet–Afghan War in April 1984 (the regional memorial book gives 19 April, the official burial record 20 April); a street in the village is named in his honour.

=== Chernobyl disaster ===
The village was exposed to fallout from the 1986 Chernobyl disaster. A dose forecast published in the regional memorial book estimated the residents' dose in 1988 at 0.15 rem per year and the cumulative dose for 1986–2060 at 6.29 rem (1.2 external and 5.09 internal). Residents of the neighbouring village of Dobraya Volya, where the lifetime dose limit was expected to be exceeded, were resettled to the newly built settlement of Dubauka. Since the late 1980s the village has been in a radiation-control zone.

== Demographics ==
According to the 2019 census, the population was 2,030. A 2018 figure of 2,258 is also reported.

Year	Households	Inhabitants	Note
1770	36	—	peasant households of the monastery's subjects
1795	64	—	
1845	76	—	per inventory: 76 corvée households, 4 cottagers, 1 landless peasant
1850	80	675	335 male and 340 female peasant souls
1884	114	734	the survey Volosti i vazhneishie seleniya (1880s) gives 736 inhabitants
1908	232	1,705	
1921	300	1,814	census of 30 September 1921, including the railway station (the encyclopedia Harady i vioski Bielarusi gives 1923)
1930	—	1,303	
late 1939	—	1,407	
1941	570	2,250	on the eve of the war
1971	607	2,882	
1994	803	2,549	
2002	805	2,534	
2005	799	2,566	
2009	—	2,332	census
2019	—	2,030	census

== Economy and infrastructure ==
The village is home to the Polesie Experimental Station of Land Reclamation and Grassland Farming (the successor of the former Kalinin collective farm), a timber-processing shop belonging to the Luninyets forestry enterprise, the Dziatlavičy forestry district, a road-maintenance depot, several shops belonging to the Luninyets district consumer cooperative, the "Svitanak" snack bar, Dziatlavičy Secondary School, a nursery-kindergarten, a branch of a children's music school, the Dziatlavičy central rural House of Culture, part of the district's Centralised Club System, a library established in 1951, a general practitioner's outpatient clinic, a post office branch, a branch of Belarusbank, a bathhouse, a communal-services branch, and a water-utility branch. Individual entrepreneurs and craftsmen also operate in the village.

=== Polesie Experimental Station ===
The Polesie Experimental Station of Land Reclamation and Grassland Farming was established in the early post-war years as part of a Soviet programme to reclaim and develop the drained peatlands of Belarusian Polesia; its central estate, the neighbouring settlement, was renamed Polessky in 1969.

In 2019 the station absorbed the neighbouring, financially struggling farm enterprise "Dzyatlavitski"; at the time of the merger the Dziatlavičy dairy farm had about 400 head of cattle, a number that grew to around 1,000 over the following two years as the farm was reconstructed and a new milking parlour was built.

=== Forestry ===
The Dziatlavičy forestry district is one of the most productive under the Luninyets state forestry enterprise, employing 24 people. In 2015, 22 hectares of forest were planted, and 20.2 hectares in 2016; logging for industrial use amounted to 11,800 m³ in 2015, with a further 5,000 m³ for principal use.

The local timber-processing shop is a modern facility that in 2015 processed 26,876 m³ of raw timber and produced 18,736 m³ of finished output. Its products (sawn timber, firewood, debarked poles) are regularly exported to Germany, France, Poland and Lithuania; the shop employs 47 people.

=== Transport ===
The wooden station building at Dziatlavičy (demolished)

The republican road R13 (Luninyets–Sinyauka–Klieck) passes through the village. A double-track section of the Luninyets–Baranavichy railway also crosses Dziatlavičy, which has two halts: Sad and Dziatlavičy.

=== Trade and services ===
Retail trade in the village is provided by shops of the Luninyets district consumer cooperative, including a grocery shop.

== Public services ==
=== Health care ===
Medical care is provided through a rural general practitioner's outpatient clinic, including ambulance services. In February 2026 the clinic was recognised as the best physician's outpatient clinic in Brest Region for 2025 in the region's annual quality-of-service competition.

=== Education ===
Education in the village dates back to the monastery, where, according to the school, twelve orphan boys were taught. A folk school operated from the mid-1860s (although the 1879 description of the parish states that there was no school in the parish), and in 1884 a mixed parish school opened, with 23 pupils taught by the priest D. Novitski with the help of a hired teacher, V. Shysh. The school did not operate in 1916–1921. In the interwar period a Polish seven-grade school with Polish as the language of instruction operated in the village; its building was erected in 1934. According to the official list of schools as of 1 December 1925, Dziatlavičy had one public elementary school with one classroom and one teacher; 72 children were enrolled, 27 of whom lived more than 2 km from the school. As of 1 December 1934 there were two Polish schools in Dziatlavičy: a three-grade school in the village itself, sponsored by the private gymnasium of the Tarbut society in Pinsk, and a one-grade school "across the river", on the left bank of the Tsna, supported by the State School of the Forest Industry in Łomża. The three-grade school building with a flat for the head teacher was built by the Łuniniec gmina. The school on the left bank occupied a rented house with a single classroom (grades I–IV); in 1935 it was visited by pupils of Łomża schools, who brought gifts. In 1938 evening courses for conscripts and pre-conscripts were held in the village. A Soviet school with Belarusian-language instruction opened in 1940, and in 1942, under German occupation, a Belarusian-language school operated. From the 1944/45 school year there was a seven-year school, which became an eight-year school in 1961 and a secondary school in 1965 (before that, older pupils went to Bastyn, 8 km away). In the 1950s, owing to a lack of space, some classes were held in the former priest's house. A new three-storey building opened in 1971; in 2007–2008 the school was renovated under the state programme for rural revival and development.

Today the village has a secondary school and a nursery-kindergarten. According to the school, it has 43 teachers and 296 pupils. In 2018 the nursery-kindergarten employed 12 staff and cared for 89 children.

=== Community improvement projects ===
In 2025 the artist Dzina Hrusheuskaya painted a mural in the village centre marking the 400th anniversary of the founding of the New Cave Transfiguration Monastery. Nearby, a sculptural composition of a monk embracing an orphan boy and a forged bench were installed; Ruslan Khomich set up beside the sculptures a mock schoolroom with an abacus stand and a desk made of bog oak recovered from the river opposite the church; the area was landscaped. The work was carried out with the participation of the Dzyatlavichy village executive committee and with the support of the Luninyets forestry enterprise, the road maintenance unit DEU-26 and the farm enterprise Paleskaya Stantsiya.

== Culture ==
Two women in traditional dress, Dziatlavičy, 1913 (Kunstkamera, collection of Jeŭdakim Ramanaŭ)

A peasant woman at a loom, Dziatlavičy, 1913 (Kunstkamera, collection of Jeŭdakim Ramanaŭ)

The village has a central House of Culture, a library and a branch of a children's music school. The amateur ensembles "Svitanak" and "Vytoki", based at the House of Culture, are considered among the best folklore groups in the district. The Svitanak folklore-ethnographic ensemble was founded in 1991 at the village House of Culture, preserving the local tradition of drone-based diaphonic singing. According to the district memorial book, the Svitanak club has existed at the House of Culture since 1980 and received the title of "folk" ensemble in 1993. A choir has been active at the House of Culture since 1968 and has held the title of "folk" choir since 1982. The authentic folk ensemble "Vytoki" began rehearsing in 2000 under its leader Mikalai Yaskevich. "Vytoki" took part in the "Speuny Skhod" folklore project, and both ensembles have performed across Belarus and abroad.

A museum is housed at Dziatlavičy Secondary School.

The 1879 parish description records a local custom of lighting a fire in the yard gate in the evening after a death, "so that the deceased could warm his feet".

== Dialect ==
In 1903 the philologist, Slavist and ethnographer Yefim Karsky visited Dziatlavičy on a field expedition and recorded observations later published in his report on the journey (St Petersburg, 1905), on a route that ran through Mazyr, Pietrykau, Lakhva and Luninyets, noting features of the local Belarusian dialect — including the characteristic dzekanne and tsekanne consonant shifts — and distinctive local vocabulary (for example, a rooster was called kaban, cattle tavar, and a coffin damavina).

According to Ya. R. Samuilik, who recorded the local speech from a village resident in August 1987, it has seven vowel phonemes, and the feature he names first is the "захаванне гістарычнага *о ў ненаціскным становішчы пасля цвёрдых зычных" (retention of historical unstressed *o after hard consonants, i.e. okanne: молоко, трава). Other features he notes include the vowel [ё] in place of stressed *o in new closed syllables (нёс, кён); [а] in the first pretonic syllable in place of *e, *ě (з’амл’а, н’ама); hard labial consonants before *e; and the shift of *d’, *t’ to [дз’], [ц’] (дз’ен’, ходз’іц’, дз’ед). Locally the village is called Дз’атлет’ічы.

== Notable people ==
- Denis Afanasyevich Vasilyev (1894–1943), deputy of the People's Assembly of Western Belarus (1939) for the Dziatlavičy constituency; killed with his family by a punitive detachment on 17 October 1943
- Lidiya Grigoryevna Kanonovich, calf-tender at the Kalinin collective farm, deputy of the Supreme Soviet of the Byelorussian SSR, laureate of the State Prize of the BSSR (1988)
- Yevgeniy Velko (born 1997), Belarusian footballer
- Tasha (Natallia) Katsuba (born 1995), Belarusian artist and clothing designer

== Notable sights ==
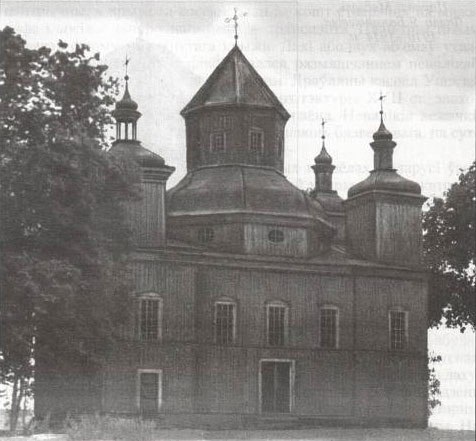
The wooden Church of the Transfiguration (photograph, 1944–1949)

- The New Cave Transfiguration Monastery, a men's Orthodox monastery founded between 1622 and 1625 and closed in 1855. Its wooden Transfiguration church, built in 1823, burned down after a lightning strike in the 1960s (the 1970s according to another source) and was not restored; a new church of sand-lime brick was built on the site in 2003. The monastery territory is listed as a historical and cultural value of the Republic of Belarus.
