= Kazhan-Haradok =

Kazhan-Haradok Кажан-Гарадок (Belarusian)
- Agrotown
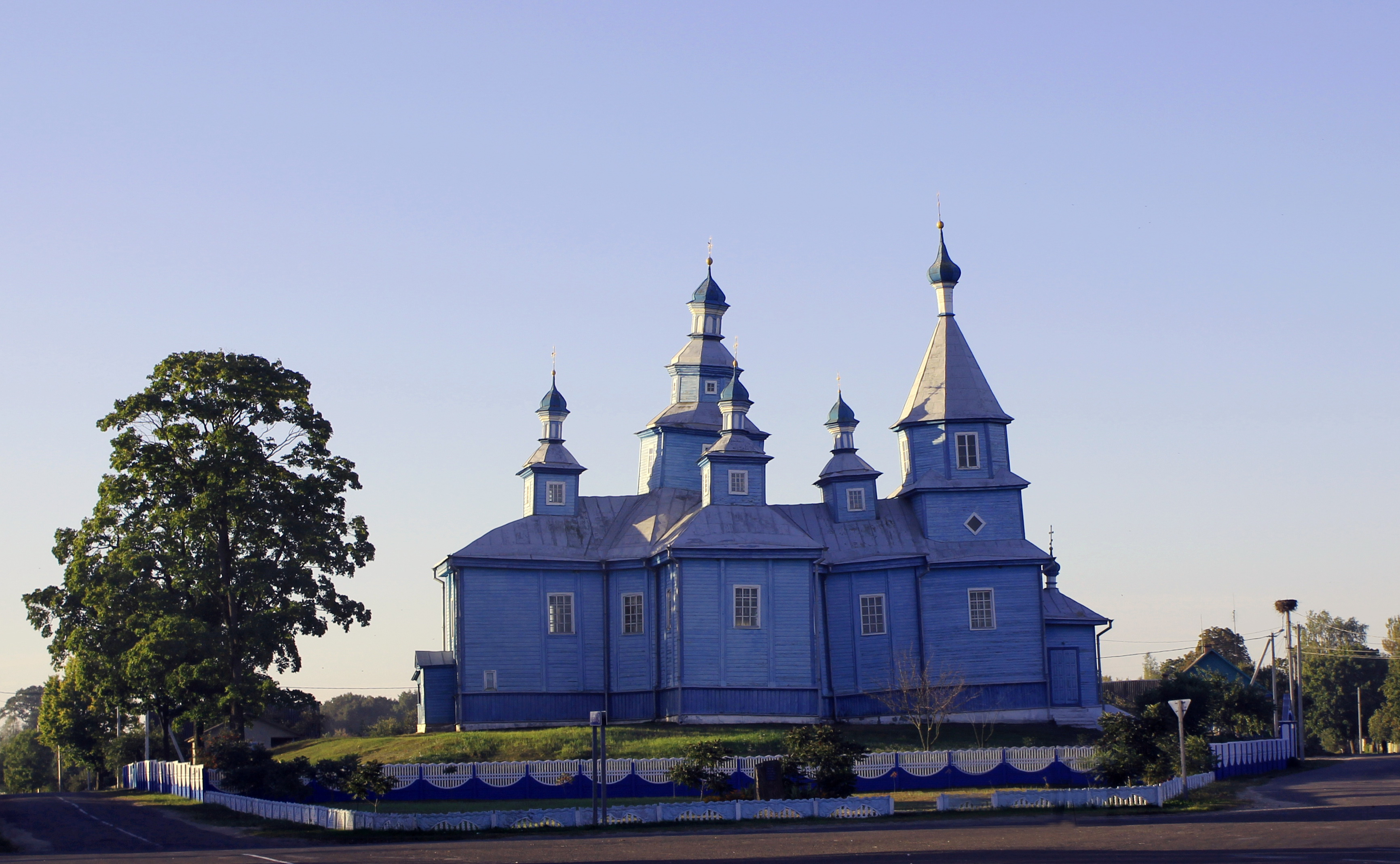
- St. Nicholas Church (or "Leaning" church), with domes pointing in different directions

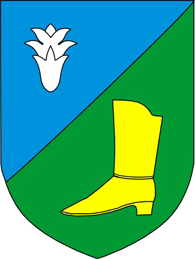
- Coat of arms

- Location within Belarus
- Coordinates: 52°12′20″N 27°00′30″E
- Country: Belarus
- Region: Brest Region
- District: Luninyets District
- First mentioned: 1493
- Elevation: 118 m (387 ft)

Population (2016)
  - Total: 1,700
- Time zone: UTC+3 (MSK)
- Postal code: 225660
- Area code: +375 1647
- License plate: 1

Kazhan-Haradok (Note: The name may be transliterated in various other ways, including Kozhan Gorodok (from Russian), Kozhanhorodok (from Yiddish), Kazhan-Haradok, Kozhan-Grudek, Kazhaneradok, Kozhangrudek, and Kurzanhradek.) (Note: Belarusian: Кажан-Гарадок, romanized: Kažan-Haradok; Russian: Кожан-Городок, romanized: Kozhan-Gorodok; Polish: Kożangródek; Hebrew: קוז'נהורודוק; Yiddish: קאָזשאַנהאָראָדאָק.) is an agrotown in Luninyets District, Brest Region, Belarus. The settlement is located on the banks of the Tsna River, four kilometres (2.5 mi) from its confluence with the Pripyat River. It serves as the administrative center of Haradok rural council {selsoviet).

It is located about 17 kilometres (11 mi) east-south-east of Luninyets, and 257 kilometres (160 mi) east of Brest.

== History ==
Excavations reveal human activity in the area around the 5th to 7th centuries AD. However, Kazhan-Haradok is first mentioned in 1493, at the time called Гарадзец (roughly "Gorodets"). It was granted city rights in the 16th century. During the 17th century there was Calvinist activity in the town. A Jewish population is also noted around the mid-17th century. The town had been part of the Polish–Lithuanian Commonwealth, but in the Third Partition of Poland around 1795, it came under the Russian Empire territory. The Church of Saint Nicholas was built in 1818.

Kazhan-Haradok was proclaimed part of the Belarusian People's Republic in 1918, and the next year became part of the Byelorussian Soviet Socialist Republic. After the Treaty of Riga (1921), the town was included in the territory of the Second Polish Republic.

In 1939, the Soviet Union retook the town and annexed Western Byelorussia, and Kazhan-Haradok again became part of the Byelorussian SSR. Following the 1991 collapse of the Soviet Union, it is part of independent Belarus.

== Jewish population ==
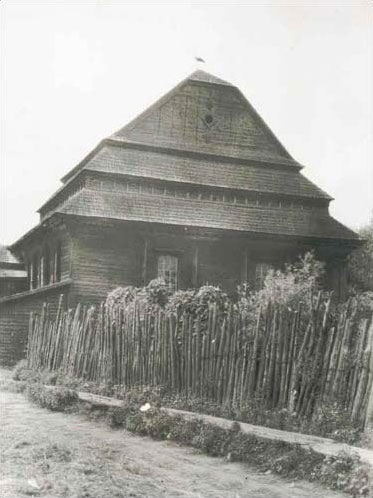
Synagogue built around 1880, as it appeared in 1916

Jews are mentioned in the town from the mid-17th century. At the beginning of the 20th century, about half of the Jews left the town, and there were three synagogues, one of them belonging to Stolin Hasidism.

Between the World Wars, many Jews emigrated to Argentina and elsewhere, leaving about 800 Jews in the town, about a third of its inhabitants.

On 5 July 1941, during Operation Barbarossa, the town was taken over by Nazi Germany, who rounded up Jews in a ghetto where they were subjected to various decrees. During a massacre on 2–3 September 1942, some 700 Jews who remained in the ghetto were murdered. The synagogue built around 1880 was burned. The perpetrators included personnel of the German Order Police from Police Battalions 69 and 306.

The Soviet Extraordinary State Commission investigated the massacre and uncovered a grave containing 937 Jews, including 325 women and 301 children. There was only one survivor. A monument now stands at this location.

== See also ==
- History of the Jews in Belarus
- The Holocaust in Belarus
