= Anton Sokał-Kutyłoŭski =

Belarusian independence activist (1892–1983)

- Антон Сокал-Кутылоўскі
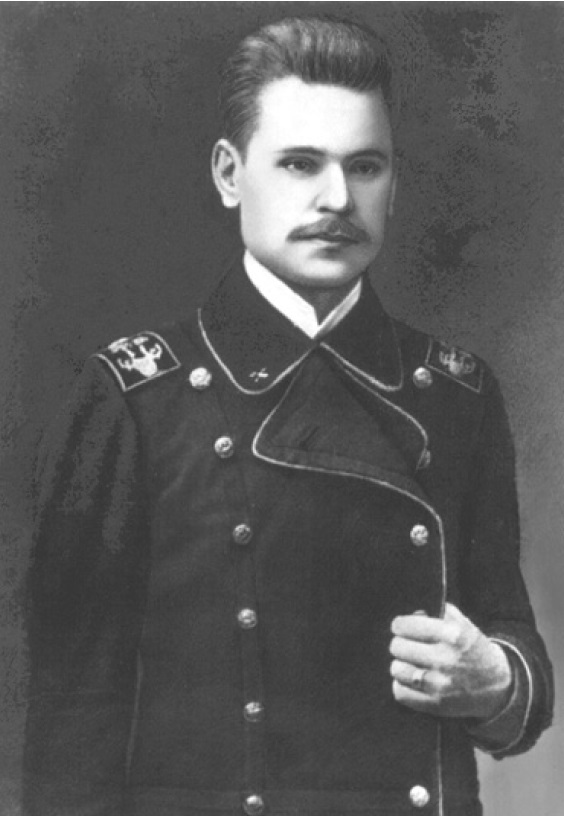
- Sokał-Kutyłoŭski in his youth
- Born: 7 February 1892; Pieravaloki-Darahišča, Pinsky Uyezd, Minsk Governorate, Russian Empire (now - Belarus)
- Died: 7 March 1983 (aged 91); Szczecin, Polish People’s Republic
- Known for: a military leader of anti-Soviet resistance in the early 20th century and a Gulag prisoner

Anton Sokał-Kutyłoŭski (Belarusian: Анто́н Со́кал-Кутыло́ўскі; 7 February 1892 – 7 March 1983) was an active participant in the Belarusian independence movement, a military leader of anti-Soviet resistance in the early 20th century and a Gulag prisoner.

== Early life ==
Sokał-Kutyłoŭski was born into the family of a petty nobleman in the hamlet of Pieravaloki-Darahišča (later Čyrvonaja Horka), Pinsky Uyezd in the Minsk Governorate of the Russian Empire (now Luninets District of Brest Region in Belarus).

In 1910 he graduated from the Panevėžys Teachers' Seminary and in 1913-1915 studied in St Petersburg.

With the onset of World War I, he joined the Russian Imperial Army and studied at the Kazan Military School. He subsequently fought at the Eastern Front in Galicia and near Vilnius, became an army captain and was awarded a St. George's Cross.

After the Russian Revolution he fought in the White Army first in Southern Russia and then in Estonia but returned to Belarus in 1920.

== Military leader of the Slucak Uprising ==
After his return, Sokał-Kutyłoŭski travelled to the Slucak area in central Belarus to join the unfolding anti-Bolshevik Slucak Uprising. There he was put in command of the Slucak brigade formed on the basis of two regiments – the 1st Slucak regiment and the 2nd Hrozaŭ regiment.

Under his command, the Slucak brigade made some initial successful attacks near Kapyl, Cimkavičy and Vyzna and engaged the Omsk division of the Red Army along a 60-km front. However, despite support from the local population, the Belarusian units lacked ammunition and arms and on 31 December 1920 the Slucak brigade retreated across the Soviet-Polish border.

== Later life ==
Between 1921 and 1939 Sokał-Kutyłoŭski lived in the Second Polish Republic. Following the Soviet invasion of Poland he was arrested by the NKVD, Soviet secret police, but escaped from jail after the commencement of the German-Soviet War in 1941.

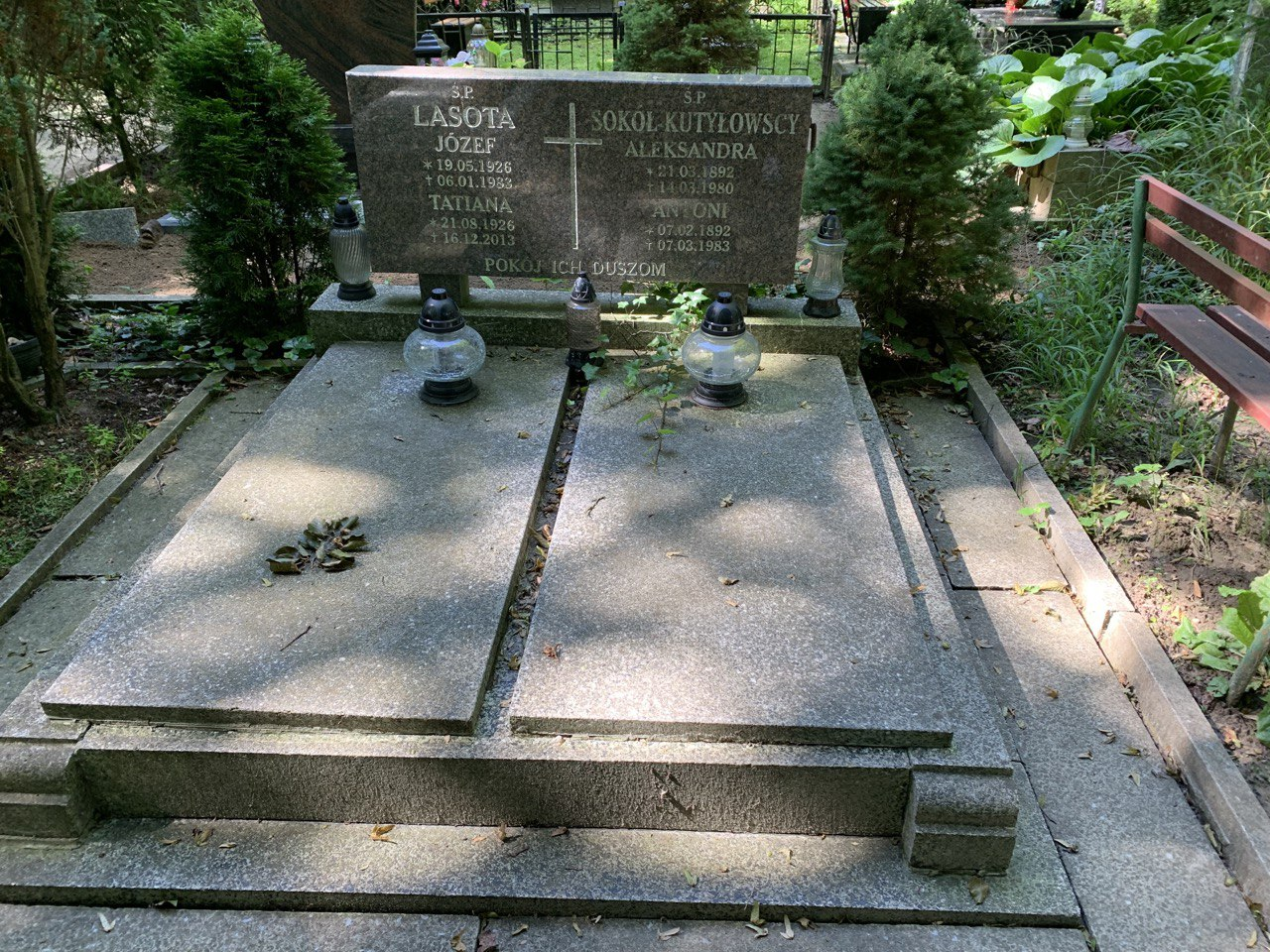
The grave of Anton Sokał-Kutyłoŭski in Szczecin

Between 1941 and 1944 Sokał-Kutyłoŭski worked in Hancavičy as a school inspector and was also involved with the Belarusian Home Guard and the Belarusian Independence Party.

In April 1945 he was again arrested by the Soviet secret police and sent to the Gulag. He was released in November 1957 during the Khrushchev Thaw and subsequently emigrated to Szczecin (the Polish People’s Republic) where he lived until his death on 7 March 1983.

Sokał-Kutyłoŭski is buried in the Central Cemetery in Szczecin.
