= Mikashevichy =

Town in Brest Region, Belarus

Mikashevichy Мікашэвічы (Belarusian)
- Town
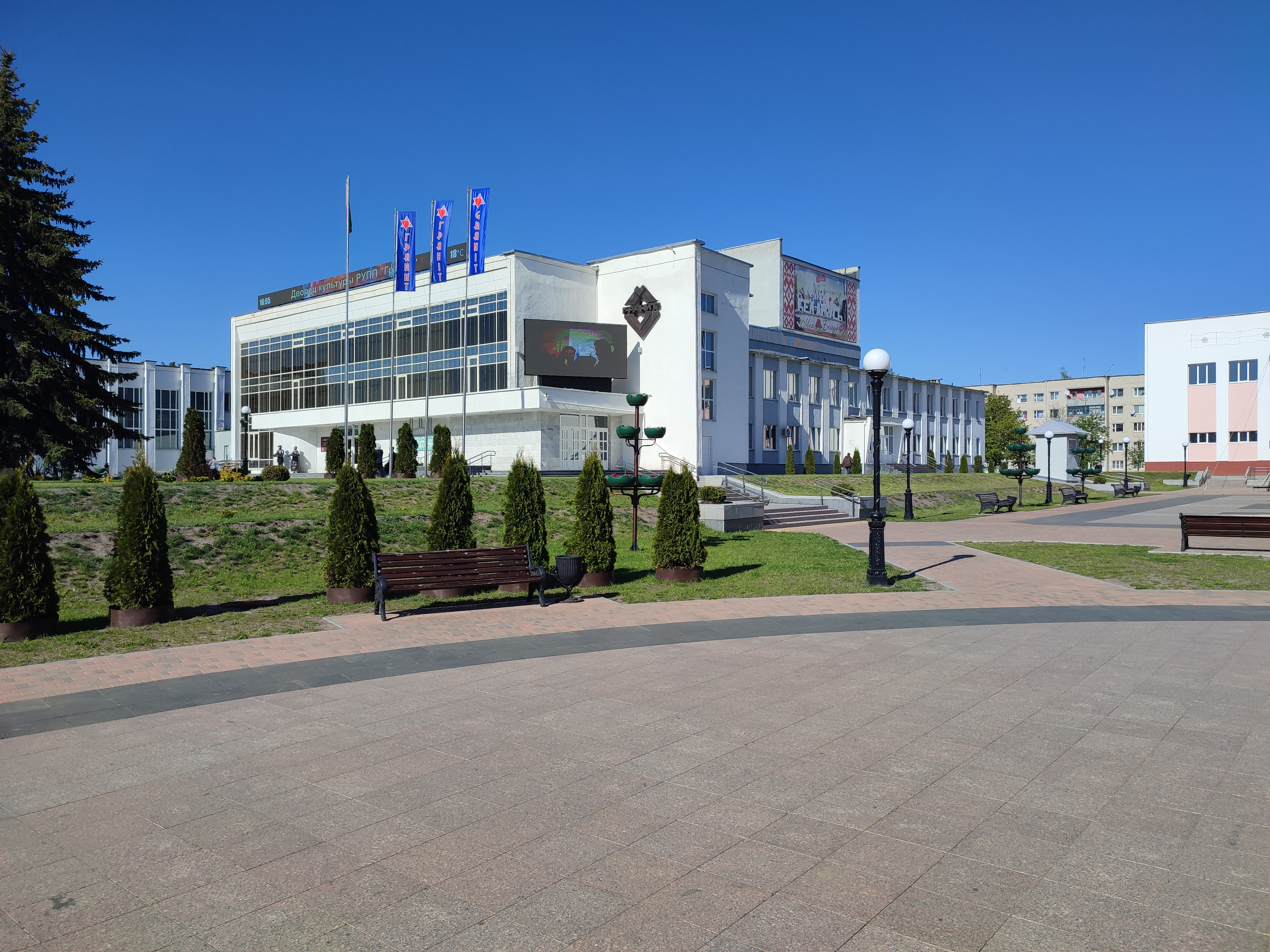

- Flag Coat of arms

- Location within Belarus
- Coordinates: 52°13′13″N 27°28′25″E
- Country: Belarus
- Region: Brest Region
- District: Luninets District
- First mentioned: 1785

Population (2026)
  - Total: 11,823
- Time zone: UTC+3 (MSK)
- Postal code: 225687
- Area code: +375 1647
- License plate: 1

Mikashevichy, or Mikashevichi, (Note: Belarusian: Мікашэвічы, romanized: Mikaševičy, IPA: [mʲikaˈʂɛvʲitʂɨ]; Russian: Микашевичи, romanized: Mikashevichi; Polish: Mikaszewicze.) is a town in Brest Region, in southern Belarus. It is located halfway between the cities of Brest and Gomel. As of 2026, it has a population of 11,823.

== History ==
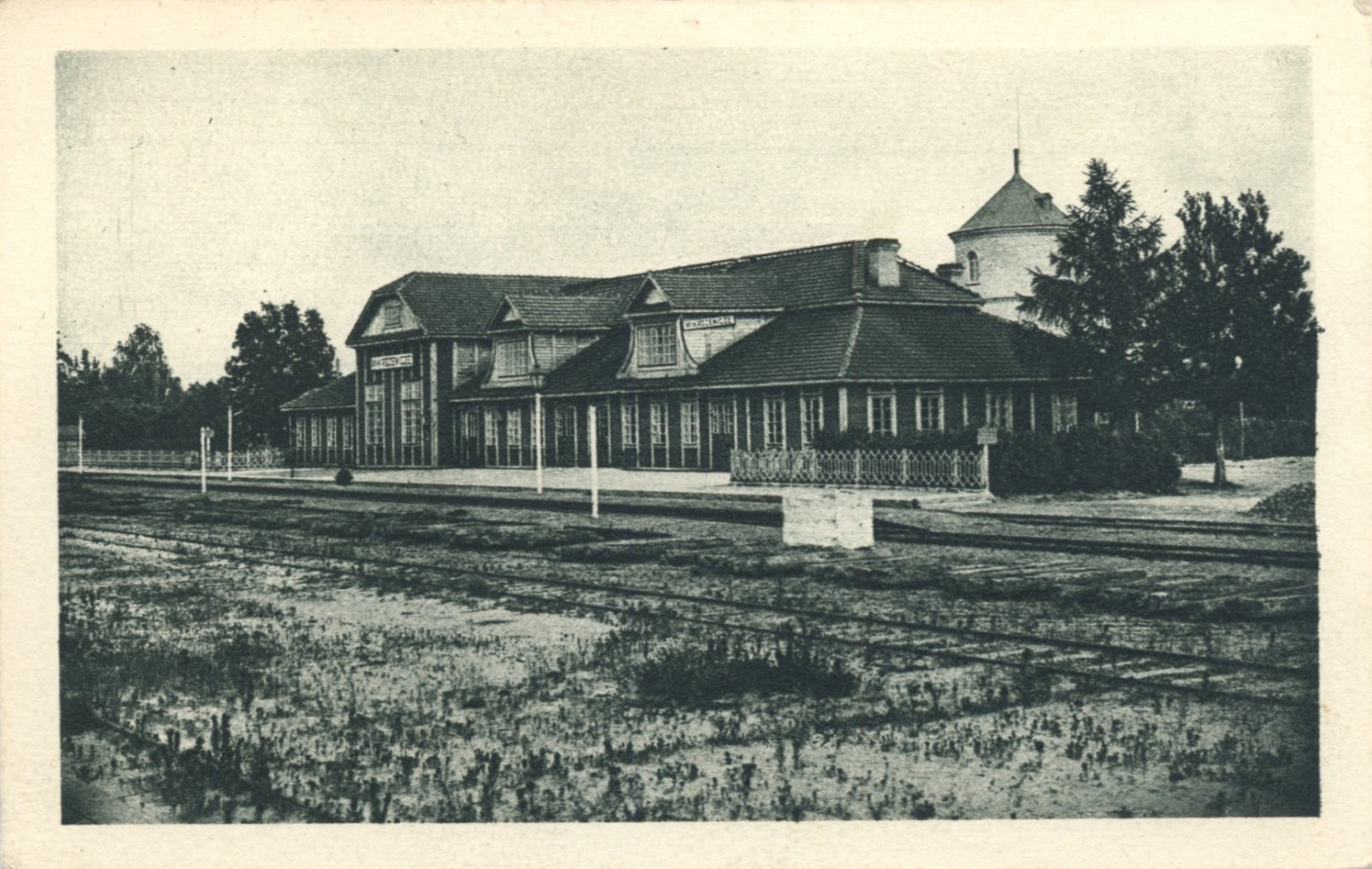
Railway station in the interwar period

At the conclusion of World War I, Mikaszewicze held a special place in the political dialogue accompanying the Polish–Soviet War. The talks started in October 1919 at the small Mikaszewicze railway station and continued until December 1919. During the talks, Marshal Józef Piłsudski informed the Bolshevik delegation that Poland was not supporting the White movement of Anton Denikin in the Russian Civil War. The exchange of prisoners was decided there. However, the talks soon broke down. Already informed about Poland's intentions regarding the Lithuanian–Belorussian front, Bolshevik leaders began a progressive concentration of the forces on the interim border with Poland.

In the interwar period, it was located in the Polesie Voivodeship of Poland.

The town had a Jewish population of about 400 before the war, a quarter of its residents. They were murdered outside the town on August 6, 1942.

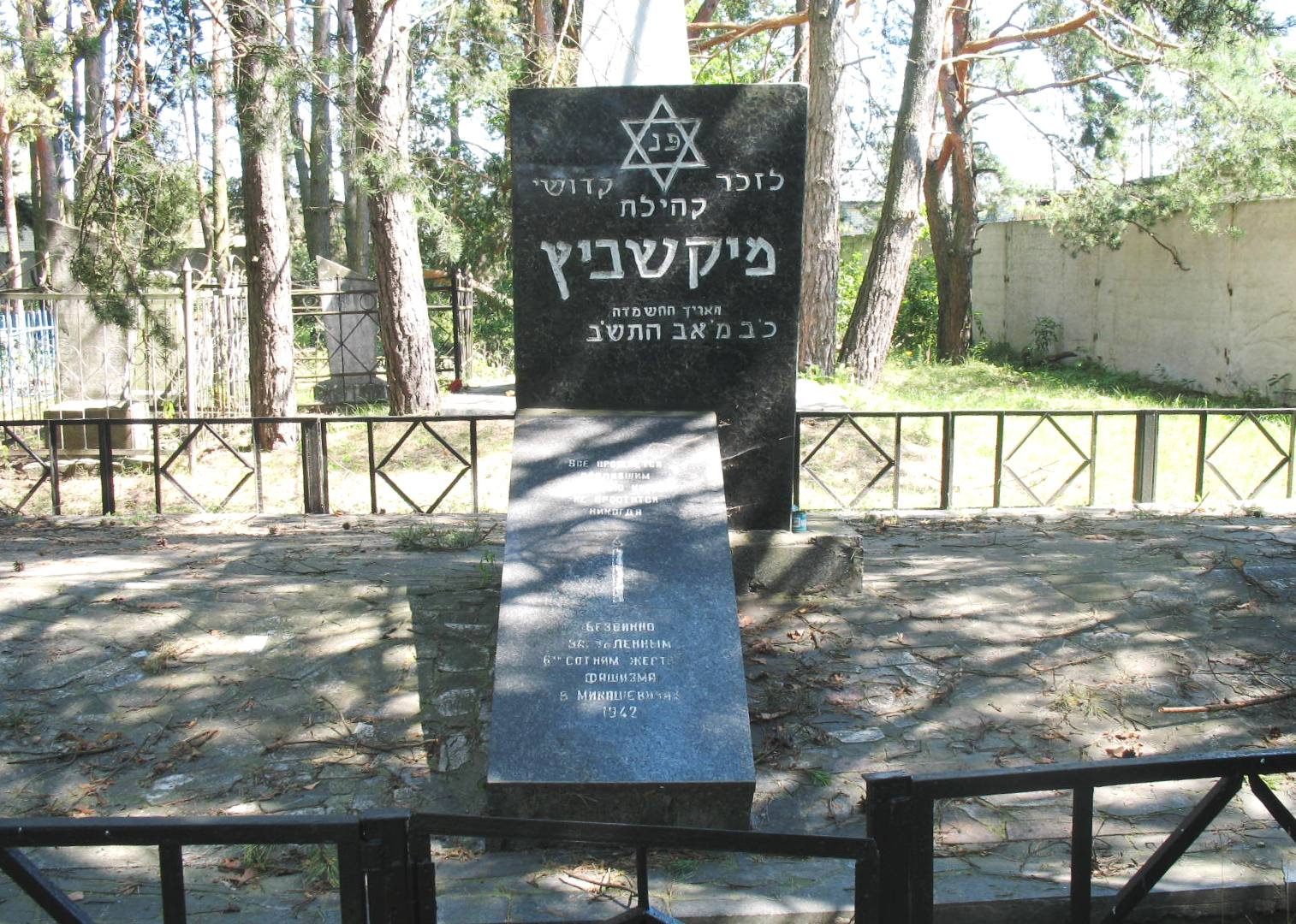
Memorial to Holocaust victims

Following the invasion of Poland in September 1939 at the start of World War II, it was occupied by the Soviet Union until 1941, then by Nazi Germany until 1944, and then re-occupied by the Soviet Union, which eventually annexed it from Poland in 1945.

== Sports ==
The town is home to FC Granit Mikashevichi.

== Notable people ==
- Sviatlana Tsikhanouskaya (born 1982), politician
