= Lakhva =

Lakhva Лахва Łachwa • לאַכװע • Lakhve
- Village
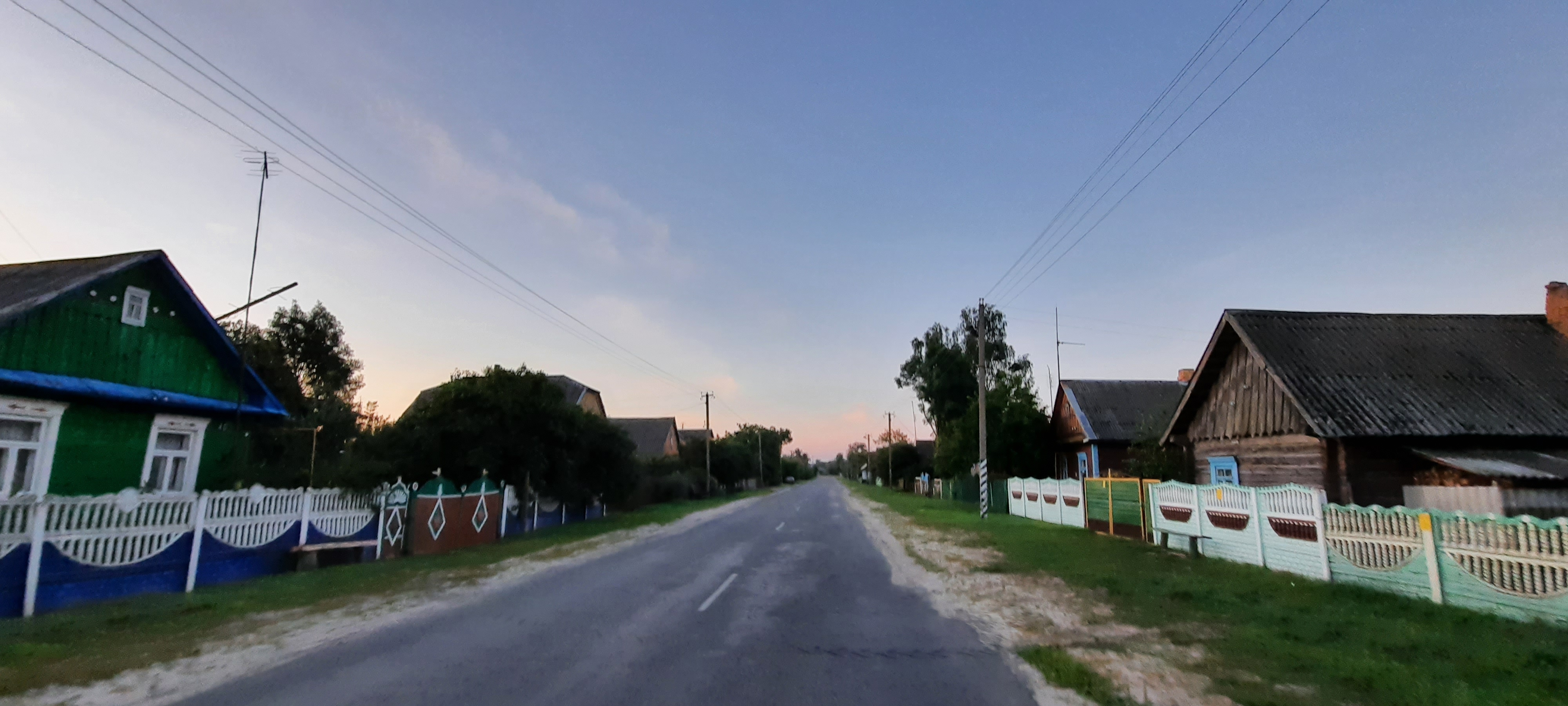

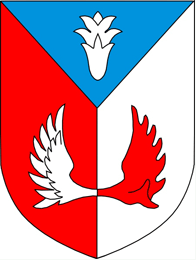
- Seal

- Location of Lakhva
- Coordinates: 52°13′N 27°06′E
- Country: Belarus
- Region: Brest Region
- Districts: Luninets District
- First settled: 16th century
- Elevation: 108 m (354 ft)

Population (2019)
  - Total: 1,108
- Time zone: UTC+3 (MSK)

Lakhva (also Lachva and Lachwa; Belarusian and Russian: Лахва, Polish: Łachwa; Yiddish: לאַכװע, romanized: Lakhve) is a village in Luninets District, Brest Region, Belarus. It serves as the administrative center of Lakhva selsoviet. As of 2019, it had a population of 1108.

Lakhva is considered to have been the location of one of the first, if not the first, Jewish ghetto uprisings of the Second World War.

== Geography ==
Lakhva is located in the Luninets district of Brest Region, Belarus, approximately 80 kilometres to the east of Pinsk and 200 kilometres south of Minsk. It lies on the Smyerdz' River, to the north of the Pripet Marshes.

The town is located within Polesia, a marshy region that has historically been at the confluence of various empires and states. As such, Lakhva has, at various points in its history, been under Lithuanian, Polish, Russian, Soviet, German, and Belarusian control.

== History ==
=== 16th century to 20th century ===
The earliest mentions of Lakhva are contained in records from the late 16th century pertaining to the Estate of Łachwa, a large private estate in what was then the Grand Duchy of Lithuania. The estate was held jointly by the Radziwiłłs and the Kiszkas, two powerful and significant Szlachta (noble) families of the Polish–Lithuanian Commonwealth.

The tax receipts and registers from the era, pertaining to the estate holdings of Prince Mikołaj Krzysztof Radziwiłł, indicate that grain farming played an unusually small role in the economy of the estate, as compared to other parts of the Grand Duchy. Given the marshy and wooded terrain, the local economy was instead dominated by fishing, hunting and forestry.

On March 23, 1588, the Estate of Łachwa was formally divided between Prince Radziwiłł and Jan Kiszka, with the village falling within the Radziwiłł holdings. It is known that Lakhva became a town at some point during this period. The 1588 agreement between Radziwiłł and Kiszka dividing the estate refers to Lakhva as a village, but a document dated February 23, 1593 refers to it as a town and to its residents as townspeople. After 1593, archival documents consistently refer to Lakhva as a town. A tax receipt from 1596 indicates that the portions of the town subject to tax consisted of 7 houses in the town square, 60 street houses, 20 "poor dwellings" (chałupy nędzne), 2 craftsmen, 4 tenants without cattle, 4 vendors and one mill-wheel.

Due to conflicting royal charters, Lakhva fell within the administrative control of both the powiat of Nowogródek and the powiat of Pinsk. Prince Radziwiłł apparently preferred to deal with the administration in Nowogródek, leading to protracted legal proceedings by the authorities in Pinsk. In 1600, King Sigismund III settled the dispute by confirming that Lakhva belonged to Nowogródek.

In 1746, on request of Michał Kazimierz Radziwiłł, the catholic Church of Holy Trinity was built in the town.

The town remained within Poland until the Second Partition of Poland in 1793, when it was absorbed into the Russian Empire. In 1832, after the death of Stefania Radziwiłł, the last heir to the estate from the Radziwiłł family, the ownership was inherited by her husband, Ludwig zu Sayn-Wittgenstein-Berleburg. It was later inherited by their son, Peter zu Sayn-Wittgenstein, who was its last hereditary owner until his death in 1887.

In 1895, the village was part of Mozyrsky Uyezd, Minsk Governorate. Lakhva and its administrative dependencies covered the area of 255,000 desyatinas (277,950 hectares), of which about 66.6% was forest; 16.5% marshland, roads and waters; 15.7% meadow and mown marshland; 1.2% farmland. The population of that area was about 9,000 people, out of which 7,800 were orthodox; less than 400 were catholics; the rest were Jews. The language of the population was a mix of Belarusian and Ukrainian.

Russian dominion over the area lasted until the end of the First World War, when the region was briefly ceded to the German Empire under the Treaty of Brest-Litovsk. After the Polish-Soviet War of 1919-21, Lakhva once again fell under Polish control, and was incorporated into the Polesie Voivodship of the Second Polish Republic. Located only 18 kilometres from the boundary of the Soviet Union, the region was policed by the Polish Border Protection Corps.

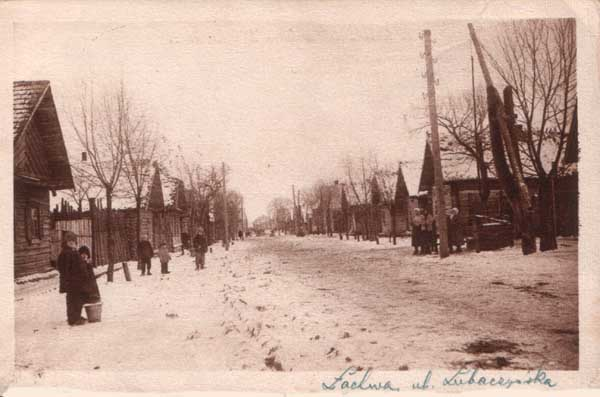
Lakhva in 1926 (then Łachwa, Poland), ulica Lubaczyńska (Lubaczynska Street)

=== Jewish settlement ===
Jewish settlement in Lakhva commenced in the latter half of the 17th century, reflecting an eastward migration of Jews during that period.

By the 20th century, Lakhva was a well-established shtetl with a rapidly growing Jewish population. At the end of the First World War, Jews constituted a third of the town's population, but by the late 1930s, the Jewish population had doubled to 2300 (out of an overall population of 3800).

On September 17, 1939, Soviet troops entered Lakhva, following the partition of Poland between Nazi Germany and the Soviet Union pursuant to the Molotov–Ribbentrop Pact. the town was incorporated into the Byelorussian SSR. As a result of the Soviet occupation, virtually all Jewish organizations ceased to function. Even though Soviet authorities closed or placed heavy restrictions on Jewish cultural and religious institutions, the Jewish population of Lakhva increased by 40% between 1939 and 1941, as Jewish refugees fled German-occupied areas to those lands incorporated into the Soviet Union.

=== Jewish ghetto ===
Germany invaded the Soviet Union in 1941, and German troops occupied Lakhva on July 8, 1941, two weeks after the start of Operation Barbarossa. On April 1, 1942, the town's Jews were forcibly moved into a ghetto consisting of two streets and 45 houses, surrounded by a barbed-wire fence. The ghetto housed roughly 2,350 people, with approximately 1 square meter for every resident. The Ghetto was to be liquidated on September 3, 1942 and a Jewish underground resistance formed, led by Icchak Rochczyn. When the Germans entered the ghetto, an uprising occurred, and members of the ghetto underground attacked the Germans. This battle is believed to represent one of the first, and possibly the first, Jewish ghetto uprisings of the Second World War. Approximately 650 Jews, including Rochczyn, were killed in the fighting and by the flames, and another 500 or so Jews were taken to the execution pits and shot. Six German soldiers and eight German and Ukrainian policemen were also killed. The ghetto fence was breached, and approximately 1000 Jews were able to escape. Approximately 90 residents of the ghetto survived the war.

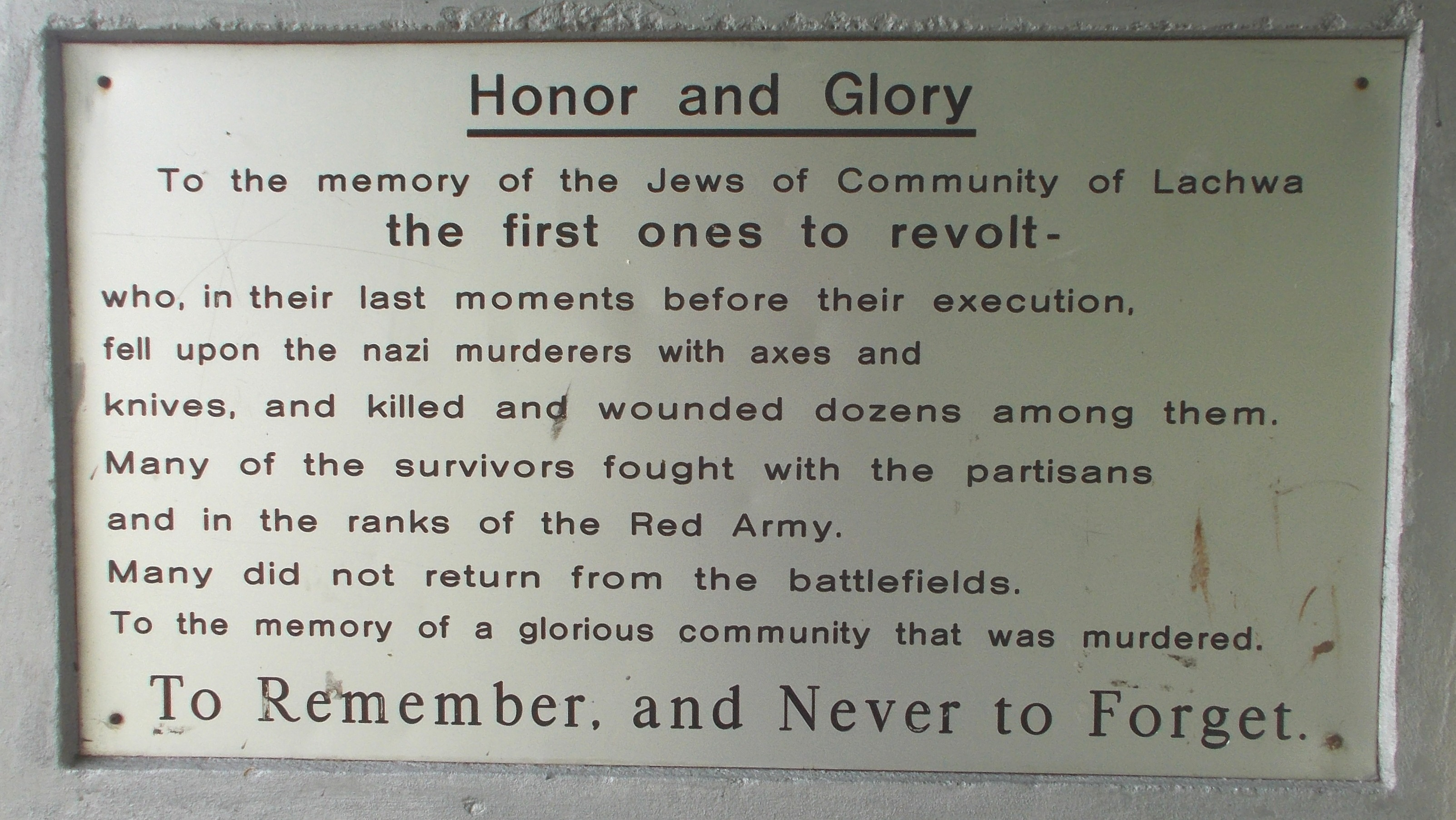
Jewish uprising memorial

=== After the Second World War ===
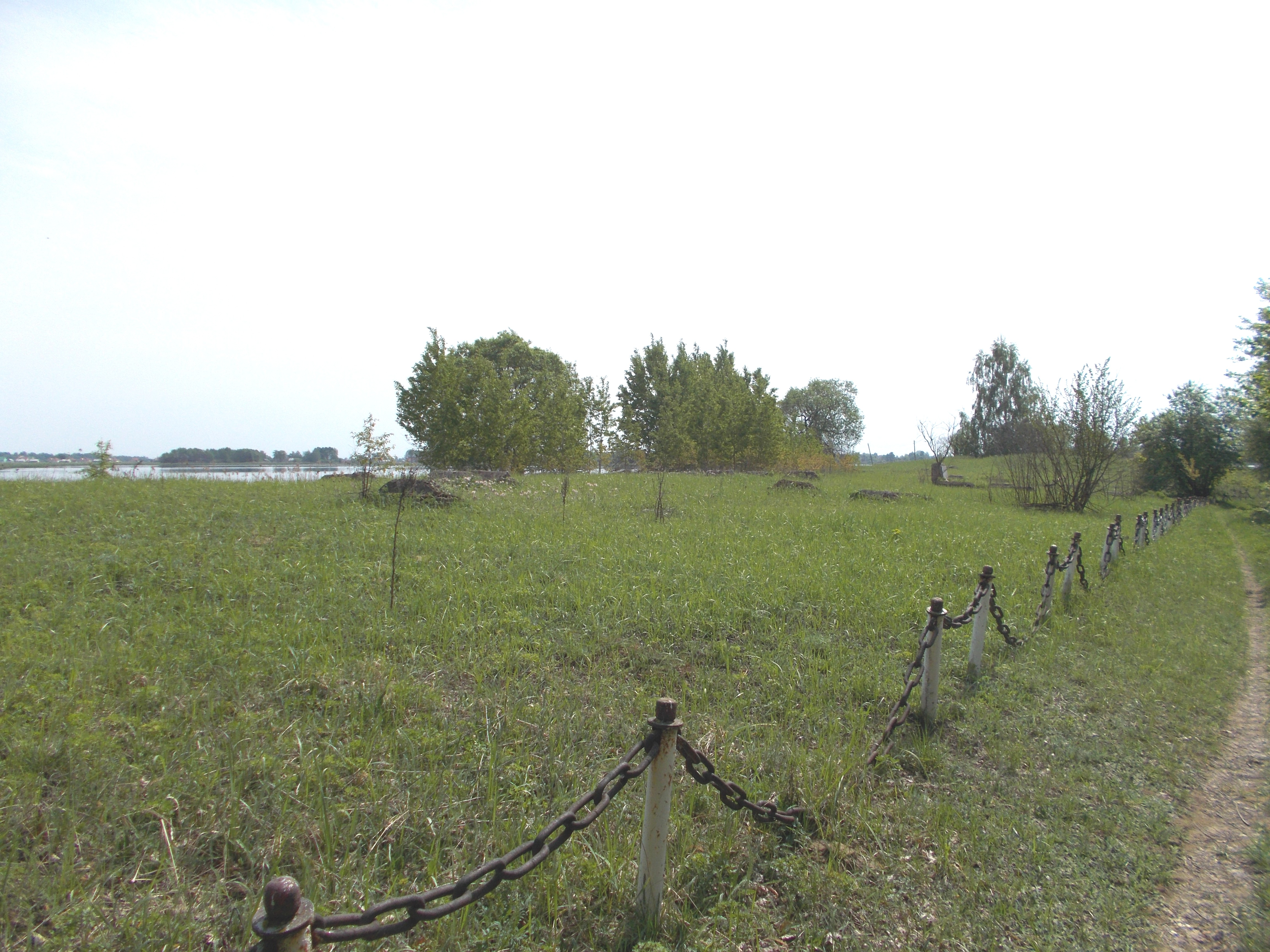
Jewish cemetery in Lakhva

The survivors of the Lakhva ghetto did not return to the town, settling in Israel and other countries instead. At present, there are few, if any, Jewish inhabitants in Lakhva, although a small memorial to the 1942 Jewish uprising was erected in 1994.

In 2000, Kopel Kolpanitsky, a survivor of the Lakhva ghetto, was one of six Holocaust survivors invited to speak at Yad Vashem during the state ceremonies for Holocaust and Heroism Memorial Day. Kolpanistky, who had been 16 years old at the time of the ghetto uprising and who managed to escape into the forest, recalled during the ceremony how his entire family was killed during the uprising.

== Sources ==
- Steinberg, L. (1974) Not as a Lamb: the Jews against Hitler, University of Glasgow Press: Glasgow.
- Siekierski, M. (1981). "The Estate of Łachwa of Prince Nicholas Christopher Radziwiłł (1549–1616)". The Journal of Byelorussian Studies. V (1): 19–28.
