= Luninyets district =

District of Brest region, Belarus

Luninyets district Лунінецкі раён (Belarusian)
- District
- Flag Coat of arms

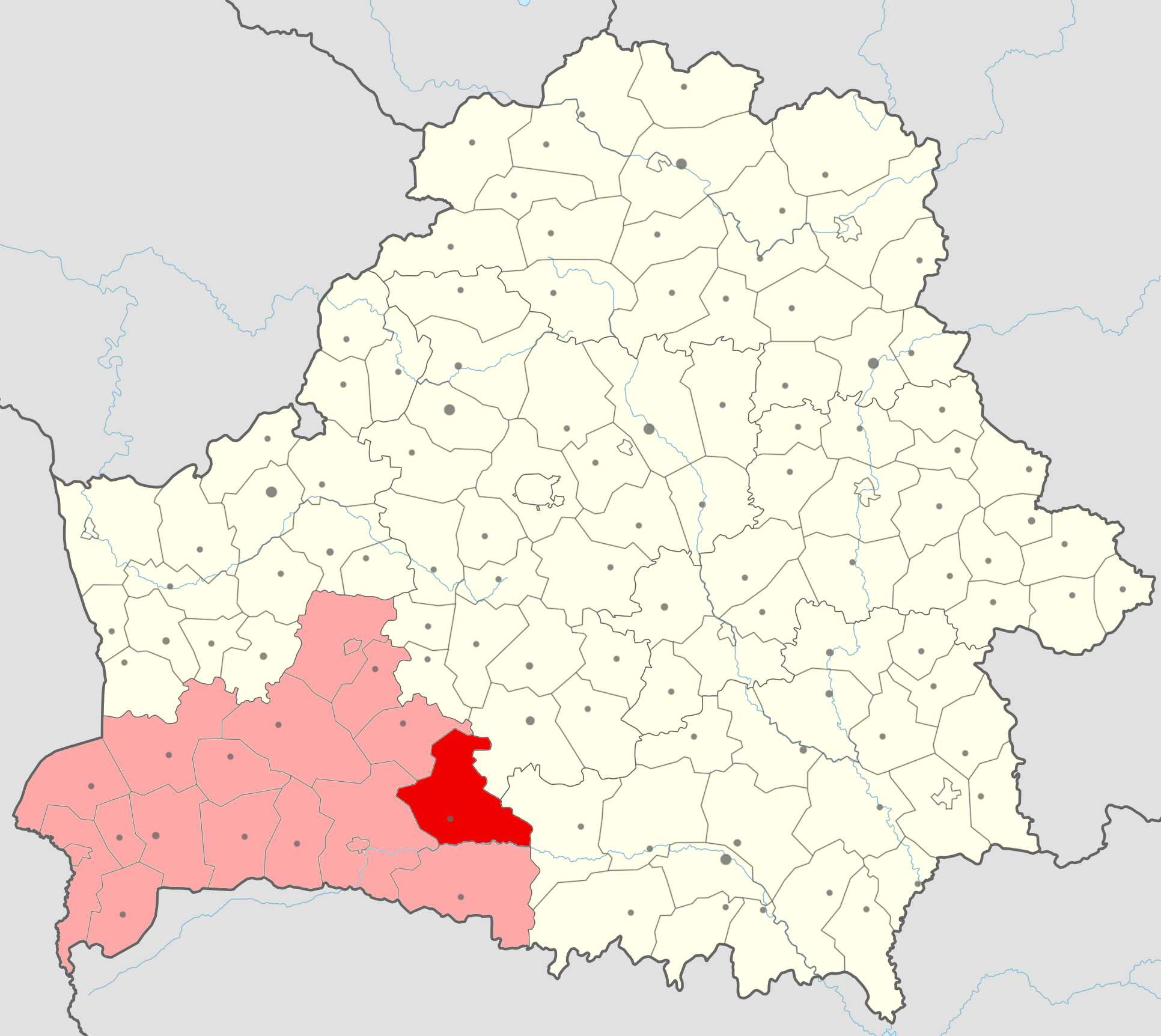
- Coordinates: 52°15′07″N 26°47′32″E
- Country: Belarus
- Region: Brest region
- Formed: 1940
- Administrative center: Luninyets

Area
  - District: 2,708.51 km^{2} (1,045.76 sq mi)

Population (2024)
  - District: 61,728
  - Density: 22.790/km^{2} (59.027/sq mi)
  - Urban: 35,814
  - Rural: 25,914
- Time zone: UTC+3 (MSK)
- Website: luninets.brest-region.gov.by

Luninyets district or Luniniec district (Belarusian: Лунінецкі раён; Russian: Лунинецкий район) is a district (raion) of Brest region in Belarus. Its administrative center is Luninyets. As of 2024, it has a population of 61,728.

== Demographics ==
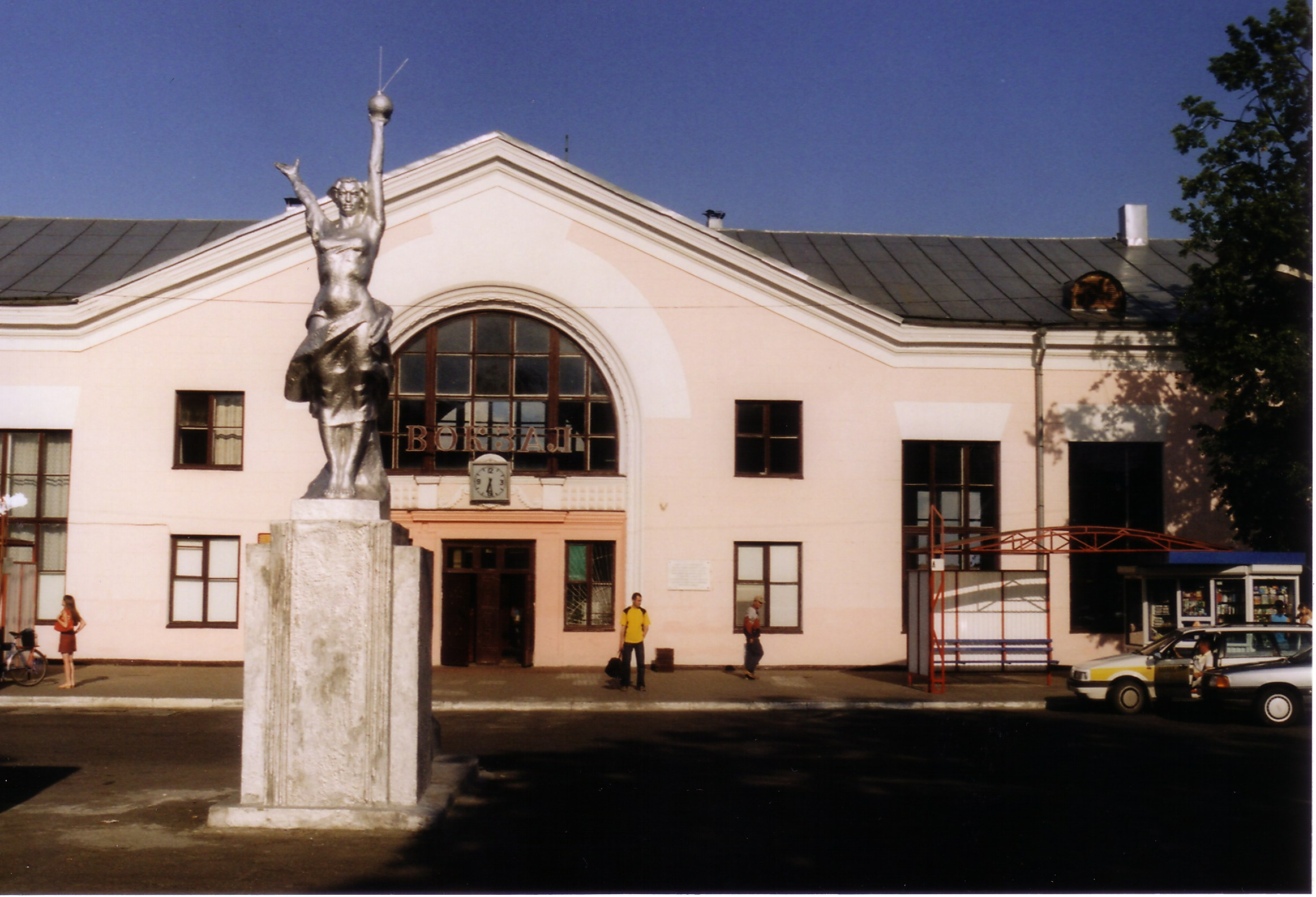
Luninets District railway station

At the time of the 2009 Belarusian census, Luninets district had a population of 73,200. Of these, 96.2% were of Belarusian, 2.5% Russian and 0.8% Ukrainian ethnicity. 76.8% spoke Belarusian and 21.9% Russian as their native language. At the 2019 Belarusian census, the district had a population of 65,736, of whom 23,654 lived in Luninyets and 12,916 in Mikashevichy. The largest rural settlements were the agrotowns Dzyatlavichy (2,030), Vyalikiya Chuchavichy (1,609), Kazhan-Haradok (1,405), Lunin (1,243) and Bahdanauka (1,216), and the village of Lakhva (1,108). In 2023, it had a population of 62,544.

== Notable residents ==
- Anton Sokał-Kutyłoŭski (1892 (Pieravaloki-Darahišča (renamed Čyrvonaja Horka)) - 1983), active participant in the Belarusian independence movement, a military leader of anti-Soviet resistance in the early 20th century and a Gulag prisoner.
- Sviatlana Tsikhanouskaya (b.1982, Mikashevichy), Belarusian human rights activist and politician
