= Tsna (Pripyat) =

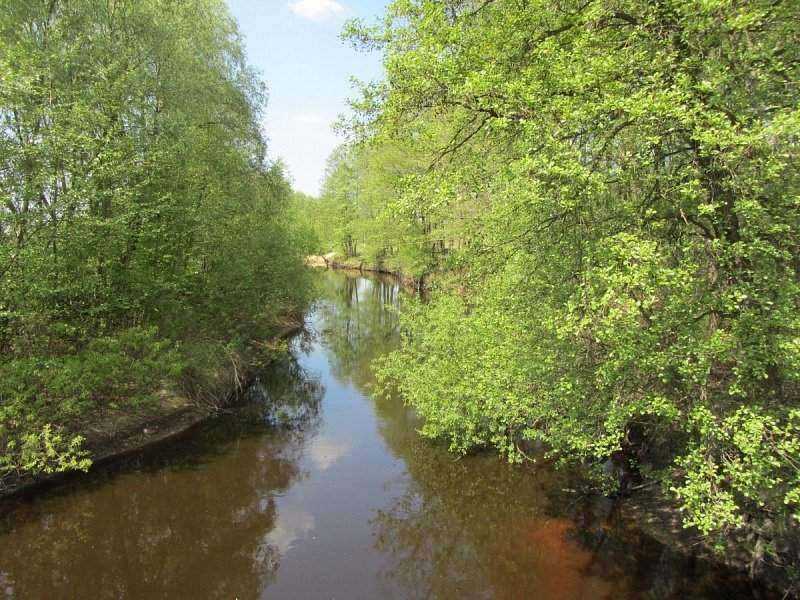

Location
- Country: Belarus

Physical characteristics
- Mouth: Pripyat
  - coordinates: 52.1583°N 27.0308°E
- Length: 126 km (78 mi)
- Basin size: 1,130 km^{2} (440 sq mi)

Basin features
- Progression: Pripyat→ Dnieper→ Dnieper–Bug estuary→ Black Sea

The Tsna is a river in Brest Region, Belarus, approximately 126 km (78 mi) long. It is a left tributary of the Pripyat. The agrotown of Dziatlavičy lies on the river.
