= Luninyets =

Town in Brest Region, Belarus

Luninyets Лунінец (Belarusian) Лунинец (Russian)
- Town
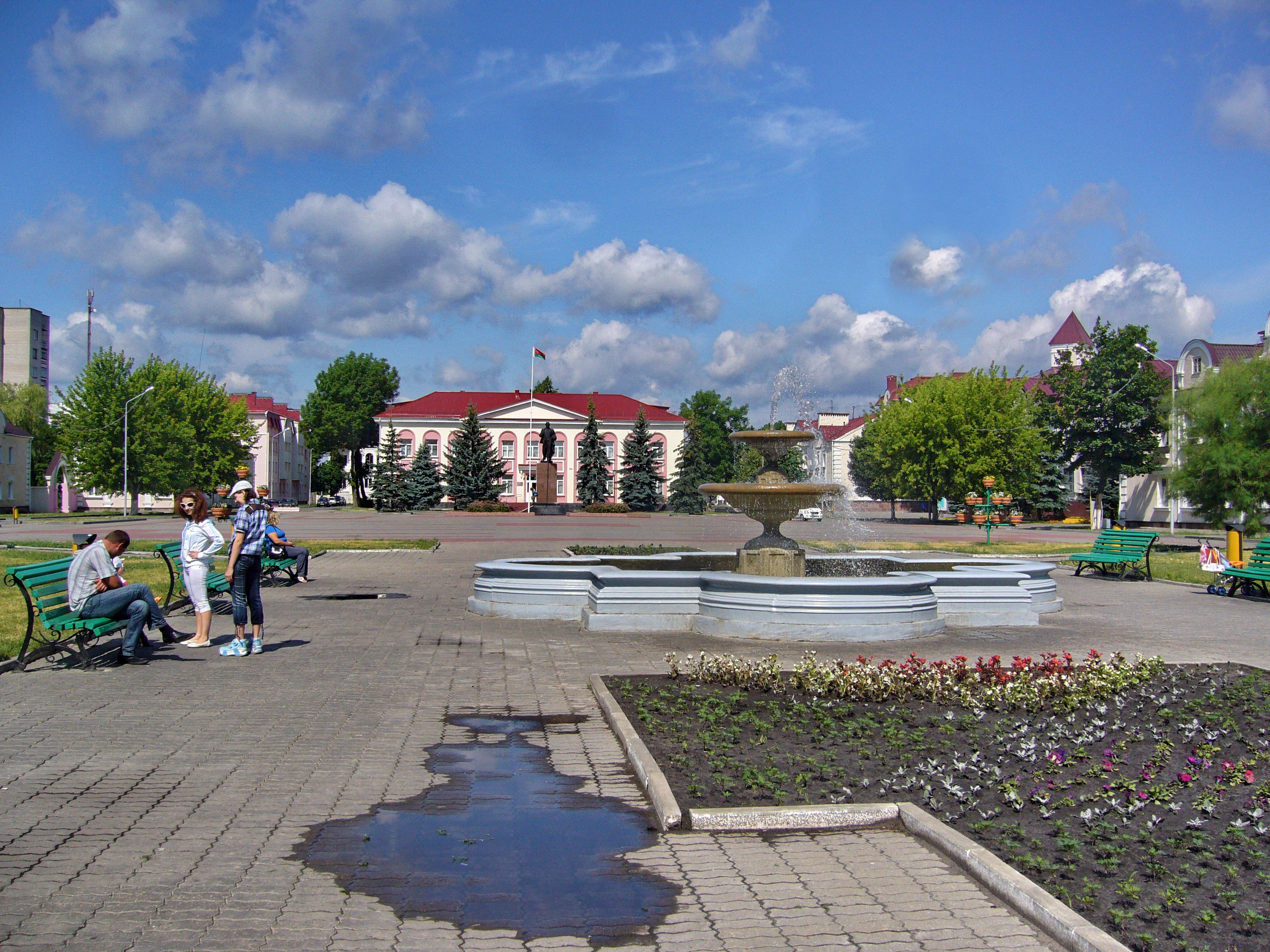

- Flag Coat of arms

- Location within Belarus
- Coordinates: 52°15′N 26°48′E
- Country: Belarus
- Region: Brest Region
- District: Luninyets District
- First mentioned: 1449

Area
  - Total: 18.1 km^{2} (7.0 sq mi)

Population (2026)
  - Total: 23,396
  - Density: 1,290/km^{2} (3,350/sq mi)
- Time zone: UTC+3 (MSK)
- Postal code: 225642-225644
- Area code: +375 1647
- License plate: 1
- Website: Official website (in Russian)

Luninyets or Luninets (Note: Belarusian: Лунінец, romanized: Luniniec, Belarusian pronunciation: [ˈlunʲin⁽ʲ⁾ɛt͡s];; Russian: Лунине́ц; Polish: Łuniniec; Yiddish: לוניניץ, romanized: Luninitz.) is a town in Brest Region, Belarus. It serves as the administrative center of Luninyets District. As of 2026, it has a population of 23,396. It is home to Luninets air base.

== History ==
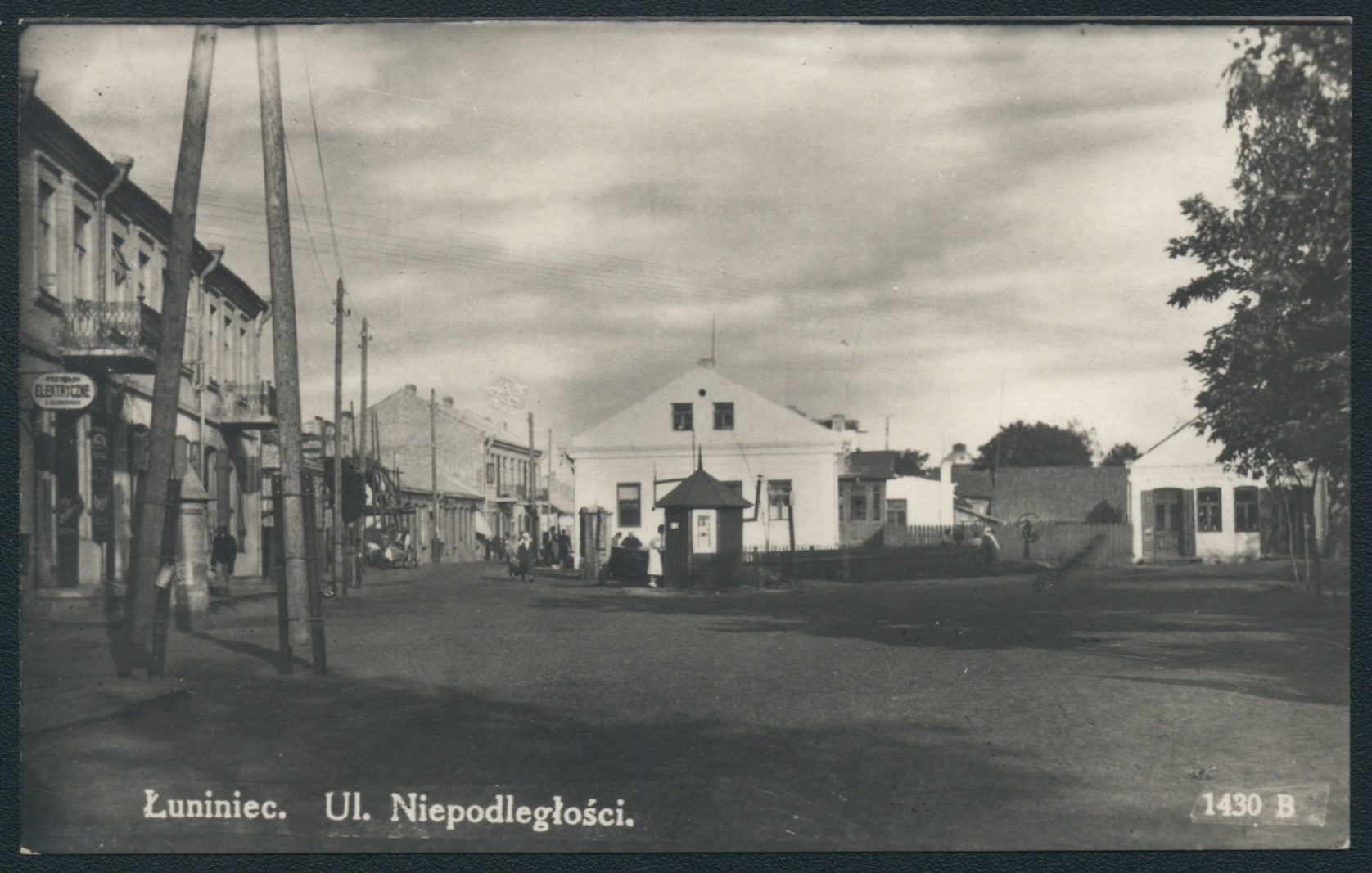
Łuniniec in the 1930s

Luninyets is said to be mentioned in print sources dating to 1540. Within the Grand Duchy of Lithuania, it was part of Nowogródek Voivodeship. In 1793, the town was acquired by the Russian Empire in the course of the Second Partition of Poland. In 1888, while under Russian sovereignty, a railway junction was built in Luninyets, linking it by rail to Warsaw, Rivne, Vilna and Gomel, and a proper railroad station was added in 1905. Łuniniec became part of the Second Polish Republic in 1921 following the Polish-Soviet War. It was a county seat within the Polesie Voivodeship.

Historical population
Year	Pop.	±%
1921	8,267	—
1931	8,715	+5.4%
2023	23,548	+170.2%
2024	23,592	+0.2%
2025	23,469	−0.5%
2026	23,396	−0.3%

On 19 September 1939, Łuniniec was occupied by the Red Army and, on 14 November 1939, incorporated into the Byelorussian SSR. Luninyets was occupied by Nazi Germany from 10 July 1941 until 10 July 1944 and administered as a part of the Generalbezirk Wolhynien und Podolien of Reichskommissariat Ukraine. After 1944, Luninyets remained part of the Soviet Union until 1991, at which time it became part of the newly independent Republic of Belarus.

The Jewish population was important in the town. From 1941 to 1943, 4,000 Jews were murdered in mass executions perpetrated by an Einsatzgruppe.

== Education ==
In Luninyets there are 2 vocational colleges – polytechnic and agricultural production.

== Transport ==
In the beginning of 20th century, Luninyets became an important railway junction. In 1884–1886, train traffic was opened to Gomel, Rovno, Vilna and Brest, a large railway junction with a depot, workshops and other buildings was built near the village, a railway station was built.
