= Wasserzug =

Wasserzug (German pronunciation: [ˈvasɐˌtsuːk]) is a surname. Notable people with the surname include:

- Étienne Wasserzug (1860–1888), French biologist of Polish origin
- Gertrud Wasserzug (1894–1992), German theologist
- Haim Wasserzug (1822–1882), cantor and composer
- Moses Wasserzug
- Otto Wasserzug (1889–1944), German actor, also known as Otto Wallburg
