= The Slaughterman's Daughter =

2015 novel by Yaniv Iczkovits

The Slaughterman’s Daughter
- First edition (Hebrew)
- Author: Yaniv Iczkovits
- Translator: Orr Scharf
- Language: Hebrew
- Published: 2015 (Keter Books) in Hebrew
- Publication place: Israel
- English publication date: 2020
- Award: Jewish Quarterly-Wingate Prize 2021
- ISBN: 978 0 85705 830 0

The Slaughterman’s Daughter, Hebrew title: Tikkun Ahar Hatzot (An After Midnight Prayer, Hebrew: תיקון אחר חצות), is an “epic historical adventure novel” written in a “fabulist style” about a Jewish community in a provincial Belarusian town which “takes the reader through the corridors of power, people and history of 19th century Belarus". Superficially it may also be described as a picaresque novel.

It was written by Israeli writer Yaniv Iczkovits in Hebrew and first published in Jerusalem in 2015. It was translated into English by Orr Scharf and first published as such in 2020.

== Plot ==
Fanny Keismann, a daughter of the shochet of a Belarusian shtetl of Motal, a devoted wife, mother of five, and celebrated cheese-maker, leaves her home. Such behavior was fairly common for men but never before had a woman done so. It turns out that she set out to find her brother-in-law, who left his family, in order to her a writ of divorce, so that her older sister could move on.

== Background ==
Motal is a small town in South-Western Belarus with a rich and tragic Jewish history. It is the birthplace of a number of famous Jews, including Chaim Weizmann, the first president of Israel.

The first records about the Jewish community go back to the 17th century. According to the 1806 census, there were 152 Jews in Motal and by 1897 its Jewish population had climbed to 1,354 Jews, comprising 32% of the total population. The majority of Jews lived on small-scale trade and crafts. Small industry started to develop in Motal at the end of the 19th century with the establishment of two candle workshops, three smithies, a mill, and a butter factory. There were two synagogues in the town and a heder.

During World War II the area was occupied by Nazi forces that perpetrated mass executions of local Jews.

== Development ==
When Iczkovits wrote The Slaughterman’s Daughter he didn’t want to visit Belarus – “ I wanted to sketch these lost worlds from my imagination and support the story with thorough historical research. I thought that if I travelled there, I would find a totally different world with no Jews, no Shtetls, just a standard Eastern European country with one Jewish museum and a desolate synagogue.” However, one month before the book was supposed to be printed in Israel, he decided he needed to do some fact-checking and travelled to Belarus.

He didn’t have high expectations for the journey knowing that the world today is entirely different from what it was in the 19th century. However, when he saw a boat on the Yaselda river “it perfectly matched [his] vision of Zizek’s boat” and Iczkovits realised that “maybe the old world and our world are not so very different” and that he was “not just following the protagonists of his book [but] might actually meet them”.

== Publishing history ==
=== Translations ===
- Italian: Tikkun: o la vendetta di Mende Speismann per mano della sorella Fanny (2018) Vicenza: Neri Pozza. transl: Ofra Bannet
- Dutch: De slachtersdochter (2019) Amsterdam: De Geus. transl: Hilde Pach
- English: The Slaughterman's Daughter: a novel (American edition: 2021) New York: Schocken Books. transl: Orr Scharf
- Polish: Córka rzeźnika (2021) Poznań: Wydawnictwo Poznańskie. transl: Anna Halbersztat
- Romanian: Fiica măcelarului (2022) HUMANITAS. transl: Ioana Petridean
- Serbian: Koljačeva kći (2022) Dereta Knjige
- Lithuanian: Skerdiko duktė (2022) BALTO leidybos namai. transl: Kristina Gudelytė-Lasman

== Awards and nominations ==
=== Awards ===
- 2015 – Funding from the Israeli Ministry of Culture and Sport's "People of the Book" award for translation of Hebrew literature into foreign languages, for The Slaughterman's Daughter
- 2016 – The Ramat Gan Prize for Literature awarded for "literary excellence in the original novel category" for The Slaughterman's Daughter
- 2016 – Inaugural award of the Agnon Prize for the Literary Arts, for The Slaughterman's Daughter
- 2021 – The Jewish Quarterly-Wingate Prize for The Slaughterman's Daughter

=== Shortlisted ===
- 2017 – The Slaughterman's Daughter: shortlisted for the Sapir Prize

=== Reviewers' notable mention for The Slaughterman's Daughter ===
- 2020 – The Economist - among the eight "Books of the Year" list
- 2020 – The Times - among the ten "Books of the Year"
- 2021 – Kirkus Reviews - "One of the 10 fiction books to look forward to in 2021"
- 2021 – Publishers Weekly - "Best Books"

=== The Slaughterman's Daughter reviewed by the major press ===
- 2021 – The Wall Street Journal - "Fiction: ‘In Memory of Memory’ Review"
- 2021 – The New York Times - "Chasing Down a Deadbeat Dad, With a Knife Strapped to Her Leg"
