= Anna Weizmann =

Israeli chemist (1886–1963)

- אנה ויצמן
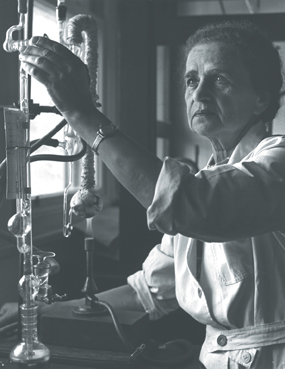
- Born: אנה (חנה) ויצמן; 1886; Motol, Russian Empire
- Died: February 17, 1963 (aged 76–77); Rehovot, Israel
- Occupation: Chemist
- Years active: 1905–1959

Anna (Hana, Anushka) Weizmann (Hebrew: אנה (חנה) ויצמן; Russian: Анна Вейцман; 1886 – February 17, 1963) was a Russian-Israeli chemist.

== Biography ==
Anna Weizmann (Hana) was born in a large family to Ezer Weizmann and Rachel-Leah Chemerinskiy. Sister of Chaim Weizmann and Moshe Weizmann. She studied in Zürich from 1905 to 1912. She worked for a year (1913–1914) in Manchester in the chemical laboratory of the university, and lived in the house of her brother. After World War I she worked in the Biochemical Institute in Moscow under the direction of Professor Bach. Arriving in Palestine in 1933, she started working at the Institute of Ziv (later renamed the Weizmann Institute) in Rehovot. Upon her retirement in 1959, she was appointed honorary professor at the institute.

Ezer Weizman, President of Israel, was the son of her brother Yechiel.
