= Minna Weizmann =

Russian Jewish doctor (1889–1925)

Minna Weizmann (Hebrew: מינה ויצמן; 1889–1925) was a Russian Jewish doctor who served in Syria and Palestine during World War I. Weizmann also served as a spy for Germany.

Weizmann was born in Motal, Russian Empire (now in Belarus) to a prominent family. Her parents were Oizer and Rachel Czermerinsky Weizmann. Weizmann's most famous sibling was Chaim Weizmann, the President of Zionist Organization and the first President of Israel.

Weizmann attended medical school in Berlin. She was a socialist who hated the Czarist government. In 1913, she immigrated to Palestine, where she became one of the few female physicians. In 1914, she met Curt Prufer, who recruited her to be a spy in British Egypt for Germany. Weizmann was caught during one of her missions in Italy and sent back to Egypt. If she had been convicted of spying for Germany, she would have been imprisoned or killed. Possibly due to the prominence of her family, or due to her good reputation in Egypt, she was allowed to return to Russia.

Weizmann survived the war and continued her medical service with the Zionist women's organization, Hadassah.
