= Yaselda =

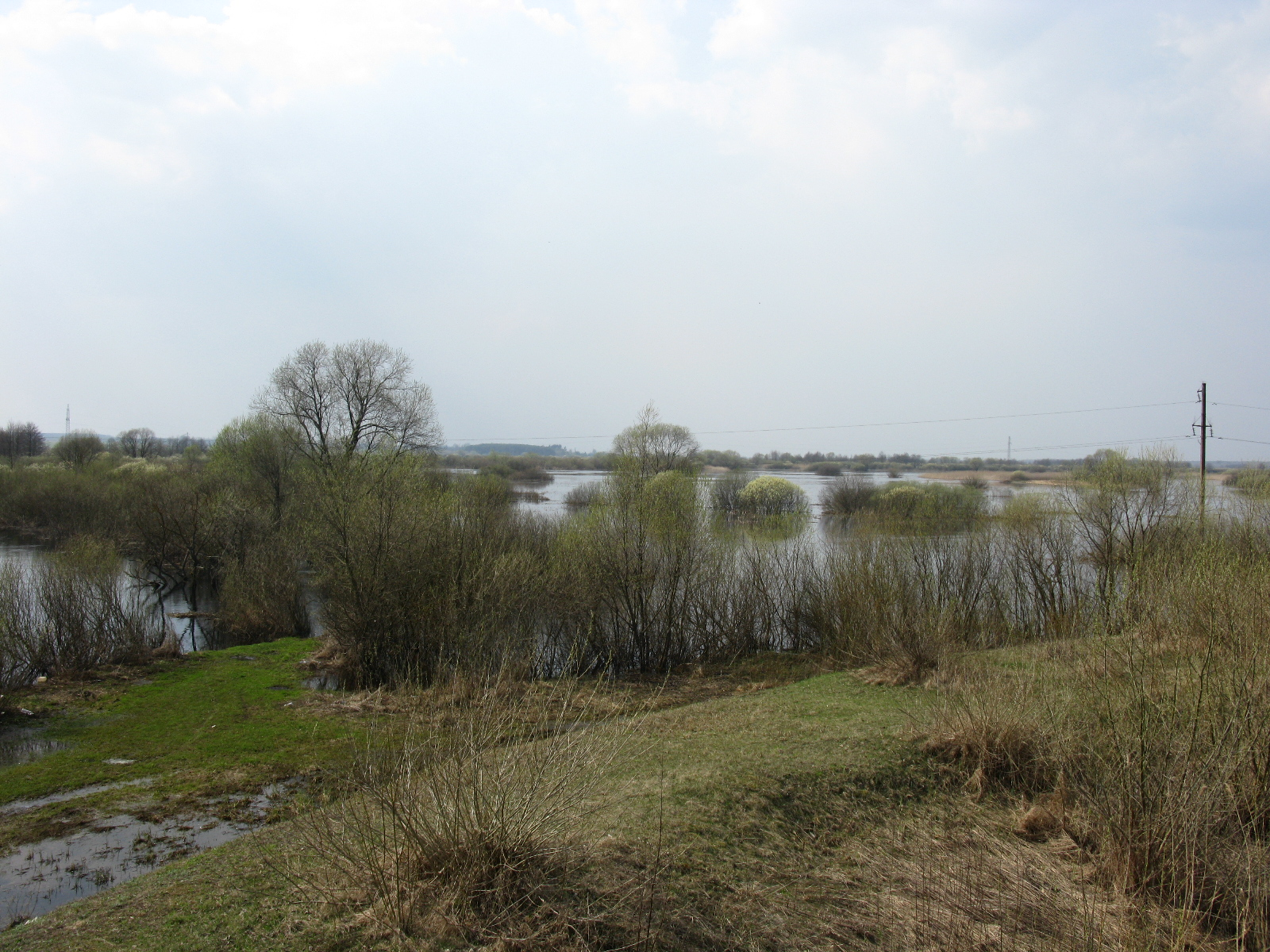
- Yaselda river

Location
- Country: Belarus
- Region: Brest

Physical characteristics
- Mouth: Pripyat
  - coordinates: 52.0934°N 26.4334°E
- Length: 242 km (150 mi)
- Basin size: 5,430 km^{2} (2,100 sq mi)

Basin features
- Progression: Pripyat→ Dnieper→ Dnieper–Bug estuary→ Black Sea

The Yaselda (Belarusian: Ясельда, alternative transliteration Jasieĺda, [ˈjasʲelʲda]; Polish: Jasiołda) is a river in Brest Region in south-west Belarus. It is linked via the Dnieper–Bug Canal to the city of Pinsk. It is a left tributary of the Pripyat. The Yaselda is connected to the Oginski Canal. It is 242 kilometres (150 mi) long, with a 5,430 square kilometres (2,100 sq mi) drainage basin.

== Yaselda in literature ==
- The Slaughterman's Daughter by Yaniv Iczkovits
