= Motal =

Agrotown in Brest Region, Belarus

Motal Моталь (Belarusian) Мотоль (Russian)
- Location in Belarus
- Coordinates: 52°08′N 25°36′E
- Country: Belarus
- Region: Brest Region
- District: Ivanava District

Government
- Elevation: 280.4 m (920 ft)

Population (2014)
  - Total: 3,772
- Time zone: UTC+3 (MSK)
- Postal code: 225822
- Area code: +375 1652

Motal or Motol (Belarusian: Моталь; Russian and West Polesian: Мотоль; Polish: Motol; Yiddish: מאָטעלע Motele) is an agrotown in Ivanava District, Brest Region, Belarus. It is located about 30 kilometres west of Pinsk on the Yaselda River.

== History ==
Founded as a royal city of the Polish-Lithuanian Commonwealth in 1554 by Queen Bona Sforza. A part of the Pinsk ‘ekonomia’ or royal land, in the late 18th century it was also part of the Pińsk powiat of the Brest Litovsk Voivodeship.

After the Partitions of Poland, Motal became part of the Russian Empire. It was in the Kobrinsky Uyezd of Grodno Governorate until the collapse of the Russian Empire in 1917. Between World War I and World War II it was in the Drohiczyn powiat of the Polish Polesie Voivodeship. It is near the center of Polesia which constituted an irregular rectangle of roughly 180 kilometres (110 mi) from east to west and 80 km (50 mi) from north to south.

Motal was a Shtetl. In 1937, Motal had 4,297 inhabitants, of whom 1,354 were Jews. (Reinharz, 1985). During the war an Einsatzgruppen perpetrated a mass execution of the local Jewish community in the Motal Ghetto. The Destruction of Motele (Hurban Motele) was published in Hebrew by the Council of Motele Immigrants in Jerusalem in 1956. It was edited by A.L. Poliak, Ed. Dr. Dov Yarden. The book has 87 pages and contains memoirs and events leading up to the destruction of the Jews of Motele in 1942.

Anshe Motele Congregation, an Orthodox Jewish synagogue, was founded in Chicago on Sept. 3, 1903, by 14 immigrants who named it after Motel.

== Economics ==
The largest company in Motol is Agromotol.

== Education ==
Motol has 2 secondary schools and an art school.

== Notable people ==
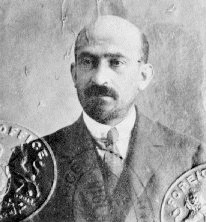
Chaim Weizmann

- Chaim Weizmann, Israel's first President
- Saul Lieberman, rabbi and a scholar of Talmud
- Leonard Chess (Lejzor Czyż) and Phil Chess (Fiszel Czyż), founders of Chess Records
- Étienne Wasserzug, French biologist
- David Bartov, Israeli judge and the head of Nativ
- Serguei Palto, Russian physicist

== Motal in literature ==
- The Slaughterman's Daughter by Yaniv Iczkovits

== Sources ==
- Jehuda Reinharz, Chaim Weizmann: The Making of a Zionist Leader (1985).
- Itzhak Epstein, pdf Jewish Motol: Genealogical and Family History Bibliography
