= Serguei Palto =

Russian-Belarusian physicist

- Сергей Петрович Палто
- Born: Сяргей Пятрович Палто; 1960 (age 65–66); Motol, Ivanava District, Brest Region, USSR
- Citizenship: Russia
- Education: Moscow Institute of Physics and Technology
- Occupation: Engineer-physicist
- Years active: 1989 - ...
- Organization(s): Institute of Crystallography RAS; Fourier Photonics
- Children: Victor Palto

Serguei Petrovich Palto (Russian: Сергей Петрович Палто, Belarusian: Сяргей Пятрович Палто, Siarhiej Piatrovič Palto; Born on 1960 in Motol) is a Russian Belarusian physicist and mathematician.

== Biography ==
Serguei was born and raised in Motol (Ivanovo district, Brest region), he graduated from high school with a gold medal (1977). Palto graduated from the Moscow Institute of Physics and Technology, specialty engineer-physicist. Candidate of Physical and Mathematical Sciences (1988), the theme of the thesis "Stark spectroscopy of ultrathin Langmuir-Blozhett". Doctor of Physical and Mathematical Sciences (1998), the theme of the thesis "molecular field effects in Langmuir-Blozhett: Stark optics and spectroscopy." Experts in the field of condensed matter physics.

== Scientific contributions ==
Author of over 160 scientific publications in leading national and international publications. The author of a new method of optical phase difference for the Fourier spectrometer (FS) and the creator of the first prototypes of the FS using this method, for the NIR, visible and UV range. Software author, manager of FS, which uses modulation of the optical delay harmonically.
