= Oginski Canal =

Canal in Belarus

Coordinates: 52°16′13.1″N 25°55′49.4″E

Oginski Canal Belarusian: Агінскі канал
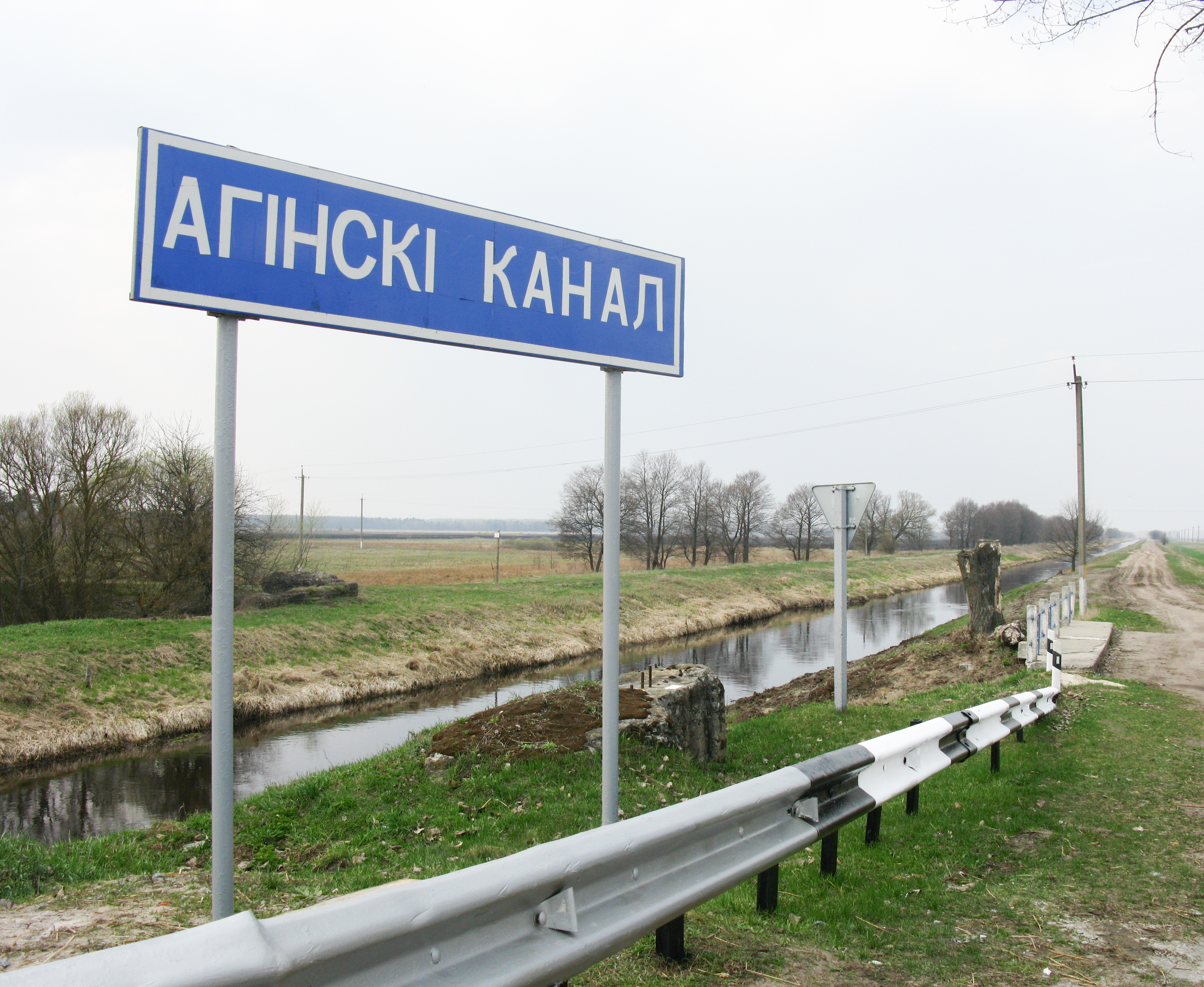
- Oginski Canal near the Highway P6

Specifications
- Length: 54 km (34 miles)
- Status: Open

History
- Construction began: 1765

Geography
- Start point: Yaselda River, Belarus
- End point: Shchara River, Belarus

The Oginski Canal is a canal in Belarus which connects the Yaselda and Shchara rivers. Its length is 54 km. Its construction was started in 1765 by prince Michał Kazimierz Ogiński.
