= Chaim Weizmann =

Israeli statesman and British chemist (1874–1952)

- חיים ויצמן
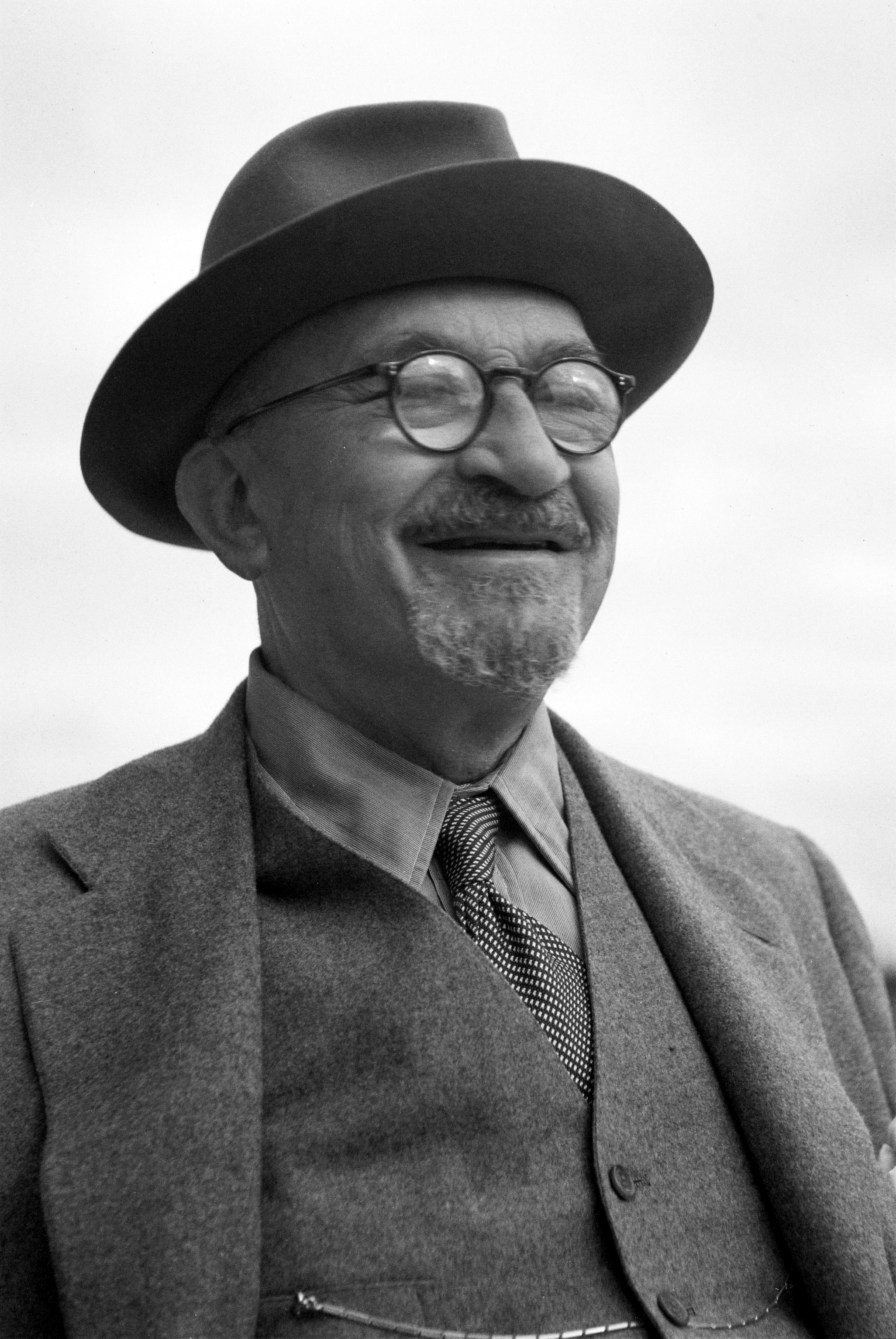
- Weizmann in 1949

1st President of Israel
- In office 17 February 1949 – 9 November 1952
- Prime Minister: David Ben-Gurion
- Preceded by: Himself (as Chairman of the Provisional State Council)
- Succeeded by: Yitzhak Ben-Zvi

2nd Chairman of the Provisional State Council of Israel
- In office 16 May 1948 – 17 February 1949
- Prime Minister: David Ben-Gurion
- Preceded by: David Ben-Gurion
- Succeeded by: Himself (as President)

Personal details
- Born: Chaim Azriel Weizmann; 27 November 1874 Motal, Russian Empire
- Died: 9 November 1952 (aged 77) Rehovot, Israel
- Citizenship: Russian Empire; United Kingdom; Israel
- Party: General Zionists
- Spouse: Vera Weizmann
- Relations: Maria Weizmann (sister); Anna Weizmann (sister); Minna Weizmann (sister); Ezer Weizman (nephew)
- Children: 2
- Education: Technische Universität Darmstadt; Technische Universität Berlin; University of Fribourg
- Profession: Biochemist
- Known for: Politics: helped establish the State of Israel. Science: industrial fermentation, acetone–butanol–ethanol fermentation process, critical to the WWI Allied war effort. Founder of the Sieff Research Institute (now Weizmann Institute), helped establish the Hebrew University of Jerusalem.

Chaim Azriel Weizmann (/ˈkaɪm ˈwaɪtsmən/ KYME WYTES-mən; (Note: Hebrew: חיים עזריאל ויצמן, romanized: Chayyim Azri'el Vaytsman; Russian: Хаим Евзорович Вейцман, romanized: Khaim Evzorovich Veytsman) 27 November 1874 – 9 November 1952) was a Russian-born British and Israeli Zionist leader, statesman, and biochemist who served as president of the Zionist Organization and later as the first president of Israel from 1949 until his death in 1952. As the foremost Zionist statesman after Theodor Herzl, Weizmann was instrumental in obtaining the Balfour Declaration of 1917 and convincing the United States government to recognize the newly formed State of Israel in 1948.

As a biochemist, Weizmann is considered to be the 'father' of industrial fermentation. He developed the acetone–butanol–ethanol fermentation process, which produces acetone, n-butanol and ethanol through bacterial fermentation. His acetone production method was of great importance in the manufacture of cordite explosive propellants for the British war industry during World War I. He founded the Sieff Research Institute in Rehovot (later renamed the Weizmann Institute of Science in his honor), and was instrumental in the establishment of the Hebrew University of Jerusalem.

== Biography ==
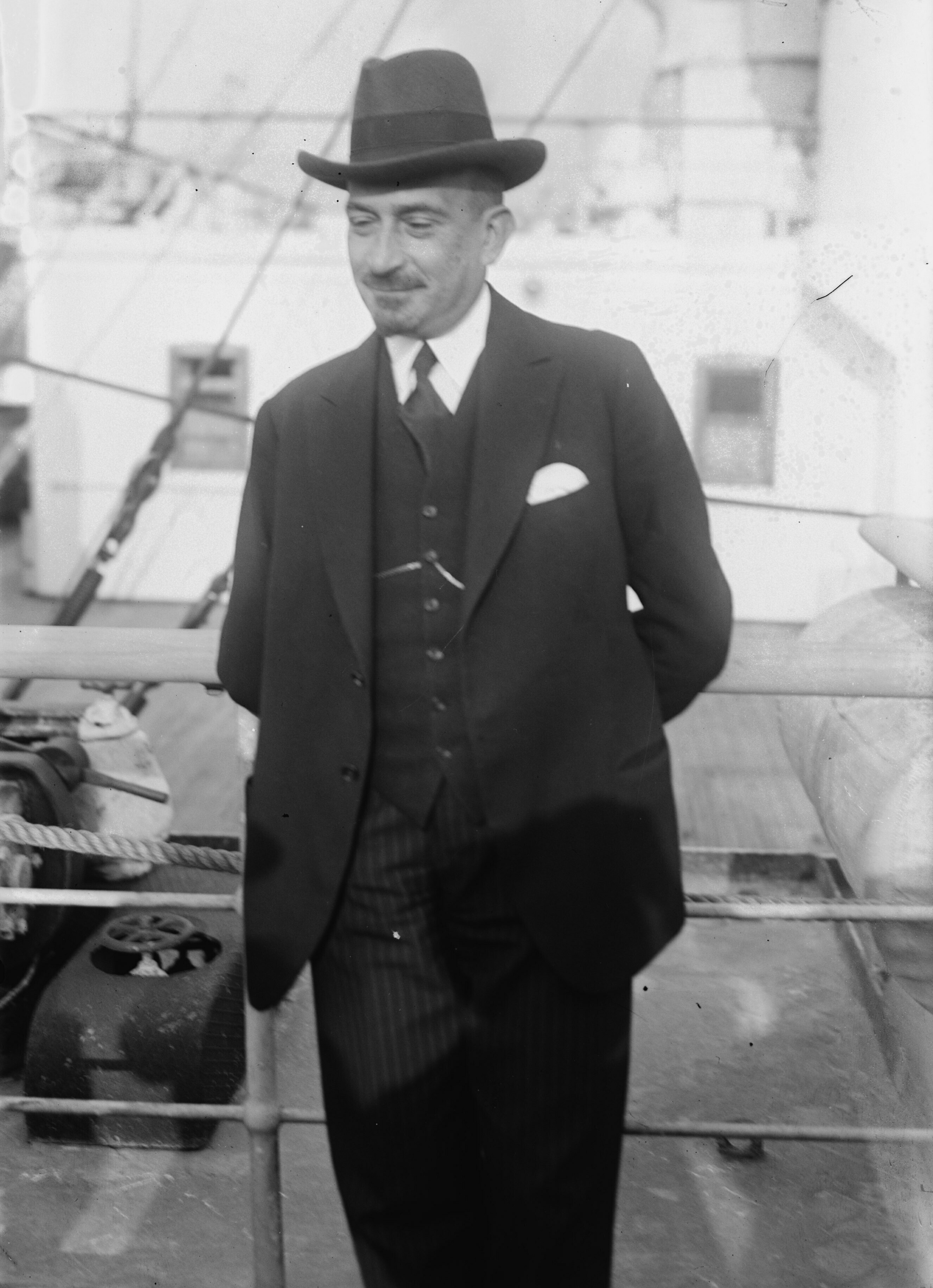
Weizmann in 1900

Chaim Weizmann was born in the village of Motal, located in what is now Belarus and at that time was part of the Russian Empire in 1874. He was the third of 15 children born to Oizer and Rachel (Czemerinsky) Weizmann. His father was a timber merchant. From ages four to eleven, he attended a traditional cheder, or Jewish religious primary school, where he also studied Hebrew. At the age of 11, he entered high school in Pinsk, where he displayed a talent for science, especially chemistry. While in Pinsk, he became active in the Hovevei Zion movement. He graduated with honors in 1892.

In 1892, Weizmann left for Germany to study chemistry at the Technische Hochschule in Darmstadt. To earn a living, he worked as a Hebrew teacher at an Orthodox Jewish boarding school. In 1894, he moved to Berlin to study at the Technische Hochschule Berlin.

While in Berlin, he joined a circle of Zionist intellectuals. In 1897, he moved to Switzerland to complete his studies at the University of Fribourg. In 1898, he attended the Second Zionist Congress in Basel. That year he became engaged to Sophia Getzowa. Getzowa and Weizmann were together for four years before Weizmann, who became romantically involved with Vera Khatzman in 1900, confessed to Getzowa that he was seeing another woman. He did not tell the family he was leaving Getzowa until 1903. His fellow students held a mock trial and ruled that Weitzman should uphold his commitment and marry Getzowa, even if he later divorced her. Weizmann ignored their advice.

Of Weizmann's fifteen siblings, ten immigrated to Palestine. Two also became chemists; Anna (Anushka) Weizmann worked in his Daniel Sieff Research Institute lab, registering several patents in her name. His brother, Moshe Weizmann, was the head of the Chemistry Faculty at the Hebrew University of Jerusalem. Two siblings remained in the Soviet Union following the Russian Revolution: a brother, Shmuel, and a sister, Maria (Masha). Shmuel Weizmann was a dedicated Communist and member of the anti-Zionist Bund movement. During the Stalinist "Great Purge", he was arrested for alleged espionage and Zionist activity, and executed in 1939. His fate became known to his wife and children only in 1955. Maria Weizmann was a doctor who was arrested as part of Stalin's fabricated "Doctors' plot" in 1952 and was sentenced to five years imprisonment in Siberia. She was released following Stalin's death in 1953, and was permitted to emigrate to Israel in 1956. During World War I, another sister, Minna Weizmann, was the lover of a German spy (and later Nazi diplomat), Kurt Prüfer, and worked as a spy for Germany in Cairo, Egypt (then wartime British protectorate) in 1915. Minna was outed as a spy during a trip to Italy and was deported back to Egypt to be sent to a British POW camp. Back in Cairo, she successfully persuaded the consul of the Russian Czar to provide her safe passage out, and en route to Russia, she managed to reconnect with Prüfer via a German consulate. Minna was never formally charged with espionage, survived the war, and would eventually return to Palestine to work for the medical service of the Zionist women's organization, Hadassah.

Weizmann married Vera Khatzmann, with whom he had two sons. The elder son, Benjamin (Benjie) Weizmann (1907–1980), settled in Ireland and became a dairy farmer. The younger one, Flight Lieutenant Michael Oser Weizmann (1916–1942), fought in the Royal Air Force during World War II. While serving as a pilot in No. 502 Squadron RAF, he was killed when his plane was shot down over the Bay of Biscay in February 1942. His body was never found and he was listed as "missing". His father never fully accepted his death and made a provision in his will, in case he returned. He is one of the British Empire's air force casualties without a known grave commemorated at the Air Forces Memorial at Runnymede in Surrey, England.

His nephew Ezer Weizman, son of his brother Yechiel, a leading Israeli agronomist, became commander of the Israeli Air Force and also served as President of Israel.

Chaim Weizmann is buried beside his wife in the garden of his home at the Weizmann estate, located on the grounds of the Weizmann Institute, named after him.

== Academic and scientific career ==
In 1899, he was awarded a PhD in organic chemistry. That year, he joined the Organic Chemistry Department at the University of Geneva. In 1901, he was appointed assistant lecturer at the University of Geneva.

In 1904, he moved to the United Kingdom to teach at the Chemistry Department of the University of Manchester as a senior lecturer. He joined Clayton Aniline Company in 1905 where the director Charles Dreyfus introduced him to Arthur Balfour, then Prime Minister.

In 1910, he became a British citizen when Winston Churchill as Home Secretary signed his papers, and held his British nationality until 1948, when he renounced it to assume his position as President of Israel. Chaim Weizmann and his family lived in Manchester for about 30 years (1904–1934), although they temporarily lived at 16 Addison Road in London during World War I.

In Britain, he was known as Charles Weizmann, a name under which he registered about 100 research patents. At the end of World War II, it was discovered that the SS had compiled a list in 1940 of over 2800 people living in Britain, which included Weizmann, who were to have been immediately arrested after an invasion of Britain had the ultimately abandoned Operation Sea Lion been successful.

=== Discovery of synthetic acetone ===
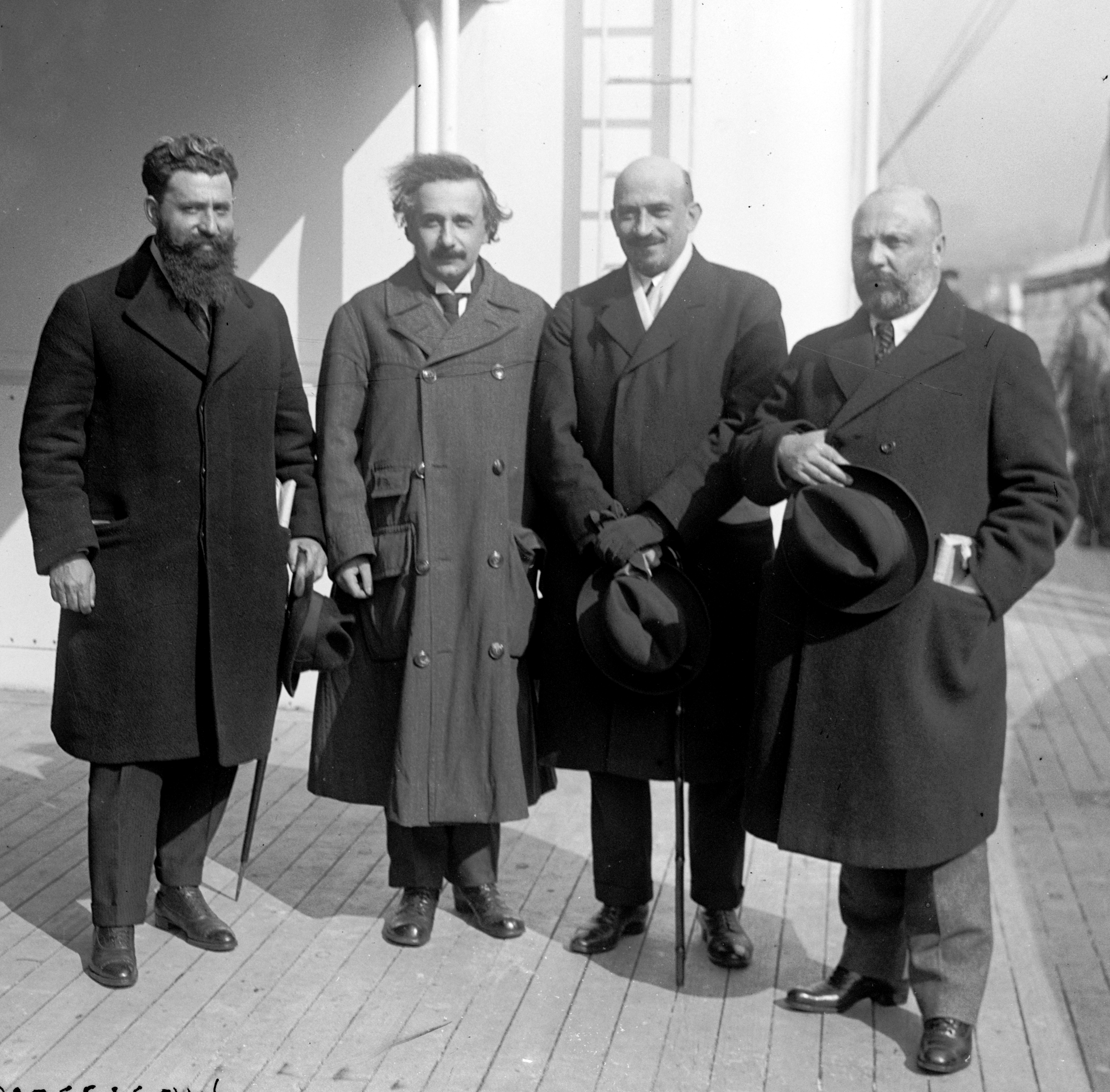
Ben-Zion Mossinson, Albert Einstein, Chaim Weizmann, Menachem Ussishkin on SS Rotterdam, 1921

While serving as a lecturer in Manchester he became known for discovering how to use bacterial fermentation to produce large quantities of desired substances. He is considered to be the father of industrial fermentation. He used the bacterium Clostridium acetobutylicum (the Weizmann organism) to produce acetone. Acetone was used in the manufacture of cordite explosive propellants critical to the Allied war effort (see Royal Naval Cordite Factory, Holton Heath). Weizmann transferred the rights to the manufacture of acetone to the Commercial Solvents Corporation in exchange for royalties. Winston Churchill became aware of the possible use of Weizmann's discovery in early 1915, and David Lloyd George, as Minister of Munitions, joined Churchill in encouraging Weizmann's development of the process. Pilot plant development of laboratory procedures was completed in 1915 at the J&W Nicholson & Co gin factory in Bow, London, so industrial scale production of acetone could begin in six British distilleries requisitioned for the purpose in early 1916. The effort produced 30000 tonnes of acetone during the war, although a national collection of horse-chestnuts was required when supplies of maize were inadequate for the quantity of starch needed for fermentation. The importance of Weizmann's work gave him favour in the eyes of the British Government, this allowed Weizmann to have access to senior Cabinet members and utilise this time to represent Zionist aspirations.

After the Shell Crisis of 1915 during World War I, Weizmann was director of the British Admiralty laboratories from 1916 until 1919. In April 1918 at the head of the Jewish Commission, he returned to Palestine to look for "rare minerals" for the British war effort in the Dead Sea. Weizmann's attraction for British Liberalism enabled Lloyd George's influence at the Ministry of Munitions to do a financial and industrial deal with Imperial Chemical Industries (ICI) to seal the future of the Zionist homeland. Tirelessly energetic Weizmann entered London again in later October to speak for a solid hour with the Prime Minister, propped by The Guardian and his Manchester friends. At another conference on 21 February 1919 at Euston Hotel the peace envoy, Lord Bryce was reassured by the pledges against international terrorism, for currency regulation and fiscal controls.

=== Establishment of scientific research institutes ===
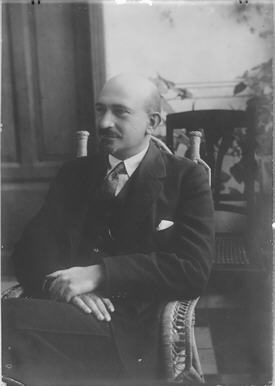
Chaim Weizmann in 1926

Concurrently, Weizmann devoted himself to the establishment of a scientific institute for basic research in the vicinity of his estate in the town of Rehovot. Weizmann saw great promise in science as a means to bring peace and prosperity to the area. As stated in his own words "I trust and feel sure in my heart that science will bring to this land both peace and a renewal of its youth, creating here the springs of a new spiritual and material life. [...] I speak of both science for its own sake and science as a means to an end." His efforts led in 1934 to the creation of the Daniel Sieff Research Institute (later renamed the Weizmann Institute of Science), which was financially supported by an endowment by Israel Sieff in memory of his late son. Weizmann actively conducted research in the laboratories of this institute, primarily in the field of organic chemistry. He offered the post of director of the institute to Nobel Prize laureate Fritz Haber, but took over the directorship himself after Haber's death en route to Palestine.

During World War II, he was an honorary adviser to the British Ministry of Supply and did research on synthetic rubber and high-octane gasoline.

== Zionist activism ==
Weizmann was absent from the first Zionist conference, held in 1897 in Basel, Switzerland, because of travel problems, but he attended the Second Zionist Congress in 1898 and each one thereafter. Beginning in 1901, he lobbied for the founding of a Jewish institution of higher learning in Palestine. Together with Martin Buber and Berthold Feiwel, he presented a document to the Fifth Zionist Congress highlighting this need especially in the fields of science and engineering. This idea would later be crystallized in the foundation of the Technion – Israel Institute of Technology in 1912.

Weizmann met Arthur Balfour, the Conservative Prime Minister who was MP for East Manchester, during one of Balfour's electoral campaigns in 1905–1906. Balfour supported the concept of a Jewish homeland, but felt that there would be more support among politicians for the then-current offer in Uganda, called the British Uganda Programme. Following mainstream Zionist rejection of that proposal, Weizmann was credited later with persuading Balfour, by then the Foreign Secretary during the First World War, for British support to establish a Jewish homeland in Palestine, the original Zionist aspiration. The story goes that Weizmann asked Balfour, "Would you give up London to live in Saskatchewan?" When Balfour replied that the British had always lived in London, Weizmann responded, "Yes, and we lived in Jerusalem when London was still a marsh." Nevertheless, this had not prevented naturalization as a British subject in 1910 with the help of haham Moses Gaster, who asked for papers from Herbert Samuel, the minister.

Weizmann revered Britain but relentlessly pursued Jewish freedom. He was head of the Democratic Fraction, a group of Zionist radicals who posed a challenge to Herzlian political Zionism. Israel Sieff described him as "pre-eminently what the Jewish people call folks-mensch ... a man of the people, of the masses, not of an elite". His most recent biographers challenge this, describing him as a blatant elitist, disgusted by the masses, coldly aloof from his family, callous with friends if they did not support him, despondently alienated from Palestine, where he lived only with reluctance, and repelled by the Jewish immigrants from eastern Europe there.

Gradually Weizmann set up a separate following from Moses Gaster and L. J. Greenberg in London. Manchester became an important Zionist center in Britain. Weizmann was mentor to Harry Sacher, Israel Sieff and Simon Marks and formed a friendship with Asher Ginzberg, a writer who pushed for Zionist inclusivity and urged against "repressive cruelty" to the Arabs. He regularly traveled by train to London to discuss spiritual and cultural Zionism with Ginzberg, whose pen name was Ahad Ha'am. He stayed at Ginzberg's home in Hampstead, whence he lobbied Whitehall, beyond his job as Director of the Admiralty for Manchester.

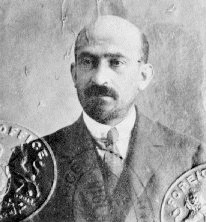
Weizmann's passport photo, c. 1915

Zionists believed that anti-Semitism led directly to the need for a Jewish homeland in Palestine. Weizmann first visited Jerusalem in 1907, and while there, he helped organize the Palestine Land Development Company as a practical means of pursuing the Zionist dream, and to found the Hebrew University of Jerusalem. Although Weizmann was a strong advocate for "those governmental grants which are necessary to the achievement of the Zionist purpose" in Palestine, as stated at Basel, he persuaded many Jews not to wait for future events,

A state cannot be created by decree, but by the forces of a people and in the course of generations. Even if all the governments of the world gave us a country, it would only be a gift of words. But if the Jewish people will go build Palestine, the Jewish State will become a reality—a fact.

During World War I, at around the same time he was appointed Director of the British Admiralty's laboratories, Weizmann, in a conversation with David Lloyd George, suggested the strategy of the British campaign against the Ottoman Empire. From 1914, "a benevolent goodwill toward the Zionist idea" emerged in Britain when intelligence revealed how the Jewish Question could support imperial interests against the Ottomans. Many of Weizmann's contacts revealed the extent of the uncertainty in Palestine. From 1914 to 1918, Weizmann developed his political skills mixing easily in powerful circles. On 7 and 8 November 1914, he had a meeting with Dorothy de Rothschild. Her husband James de Rothschild was serving with the French Army, but she was unable to influence her cousinhood to Weizmann's favour. However, when Weizmanm spoke to Charles, second son of Nathan Mayer Rothschild, he approved the idea. James de Rothschild advised Weizmann to seek to influence the British Government. By the time he reached Lord Robert Cecil, Dr Weizmann was enthused with excitement. Cecil's personal foibles were representative of class consciousness, which the Zionists overcame through deeds rather than words. C. P. Scott, the editor of The Manchester Guardian, formed a friendship with Weizmann after the two men encountered each other at a Manchester garden party in 1915. Scott described the diminutive leader as

extraordinarily interesting, a rare combination of idealism and the severely practical which are the two essentials of statesmanship a perfectly clear sense conception of Jewish nationalism, an intense and burning sense of the Jew as Jew, just as strong, perhaps more so, as that of the German as German or the Englishman as Englishman, and secondly arising out of that and necessary for its satisfaction and development, his demand for a country, a home land which for him and for anyone during his view of Jewish nationality can be no other that the ancient home of his race.

Scott wrote to the Liberal Party's Lloyd George who set up a meeting for a reluctant Weizmann with Herbert Samuel, President of the Local Government Board, who was now converted to Zionism. On 10 December 1914 at Whitehall, Samuel offered Weizmann a Jewish homeland complete with funded developments. Ecstatic, Weizmann returned to Westminster to arrange a meeting with Balfour, who was also on the War Council. He had first met the Conservatives in 1906, but after being moved to tears at 12 Carlton Gardens, on 12 December 1914, Balfour told Weizmann "it is a great cause and I understand it." Weizmann had another meeting in Paris with Baron Edmond Rothschild before a crucial discussion with Chancellor of the Exchequer Lloyd George, on 15 January 1915. Whilst some of the leading members of Britain's Jewish community regarded Weizmann's program with distaste, The Future of Palestine, also known as the Samuel Memorandum, was a watershed moment in the Great War and annexation of Palestine.

Weizmann consulted several times with Samuel on the homeland policy during 1915, but H. H. Asquith, then Prime Minister, would be dead set against upsetting the balance of power on the Middle East. Attitudes were changing to "dithyrambic" opposition; but in the Cabinet, to the Samuel Memorandum, it remained implacably opposed with the exception of Chancellor Lloyd George. Edwin Montagu, for example, Samuel's cousin was strenuously opposed. Weizmann did not attend the meeting of Jewry's ruling Conjoint Committee when it met the Zionist leadership on 14 April 1915. Yehiel Tschlenow had travelled from Berlin to speak at the congress. He envisioned a Jewish Community worldwide so that integration was complementary with amelioration. Zionists however had one goal only, the creation of their own state with British help.

In 1915, Weizmann also began working with Sir Mark Sykes, who was looking for a member of the Jewish community for a delicate mission. He met the Armenian lawyer, James Malcolm, who already knew Sykes, and British intelligence, who were tired of the oppositional politics of Moses Gaster. "Dr Weizmann ... asked when he could meet Sir Mark Sykes ... Sir Mark fixed the appointment for the very next day, which was a Sunday." They finally met on 28 January 1917, "Dr Weizmann...should take the leading part in the negotiations", was Sykes response. Weizmann was determined to replace the Chief Rabbi as Jewish leader of Zionism. He had the "matter in hand" when he met Sokolow and Malcolm at Thatched House on Monday 5 February 1917. Moses Gaster was very reluctant to step aside. Weizmann had a considerable following, yet was not involved in the discussions with François Georges-Picot at the French embassy: a British Protectorate, he knew would not require French agreement. Furthermore, James de Rothschild proved a friend and guardian of the nascent state questioning Sykes' motivations as their dealings on Palestine were still secretive. Sokolow, Weizmann's diplomatic representative, cuttingly remarked to Picot underlining the irrelevance of the Triple Entente to French Jewry, but on 7 February 1917, the British government recognized the Zionist leader and agreed to expedite the claim. Weizmann was characteristically wishing to reward his Jewish friends for loyalty and service. News of the February Revolution (also known as the Kerensky Revolution) in Russia shattered the illusion for World Jewry. Unity for British Jewry was achieved by the Manchester Zionists. "Thus not for the first time in history, there is a community alike of interest and of sentiment between the British State and Jewish people." The Manchester Zionists published a pamphlet Palestine on 26 January 1917, which did not reflect British policy, but already Sykes looked to Weizmann's leadership when they met on 20 March 1917.

On 6 February 1917 a meeting was held at Dr Moses Gaster's house with Weizmann to discuss the results of the Picot convention in Paris. Sokolow and Weizmann pressed on with seizing leadership from Gaster; they had official recognition from the British government. At 6 Buckingham Gate on 10 February 1917 another was held, in a series of winter meetings in London. The older generation of Greenberg, Joseph Cowen and Gaster were stepping down or being passed over. "...those friends ... in close cooperation all these years", he suggested should become the EZF Council- Manchester's Sieff, Sacher and Marks, and London's Leon Simon and Samuel Tolkowsky. While the war was raging in the outside world, the Zionists prepared for an even bigger fight for the survival of their homeland. Weizmann issued a statement on 11 February 1917, and on the following day, they received news of the Kerensky take over in Petrograd. Tsarist Russia had been very anti-Semitic but incongruously this made the British government even more determined to help the Jews. Nahum Sokolow acted as Weizmann's eyes and ears in Paris on a diplomatic mission; an Entente under the Ottoman Empire was unsettling. The Triple Entente of Arab-Armenian-Zionist was fantastic to Weizmann, leaving him cold and unenthusiastic. Nonetheless, the delegation left for Paris on 31 March 1917. One purpose of the Alliance was to strengthen the hand of Zionism in the United States.

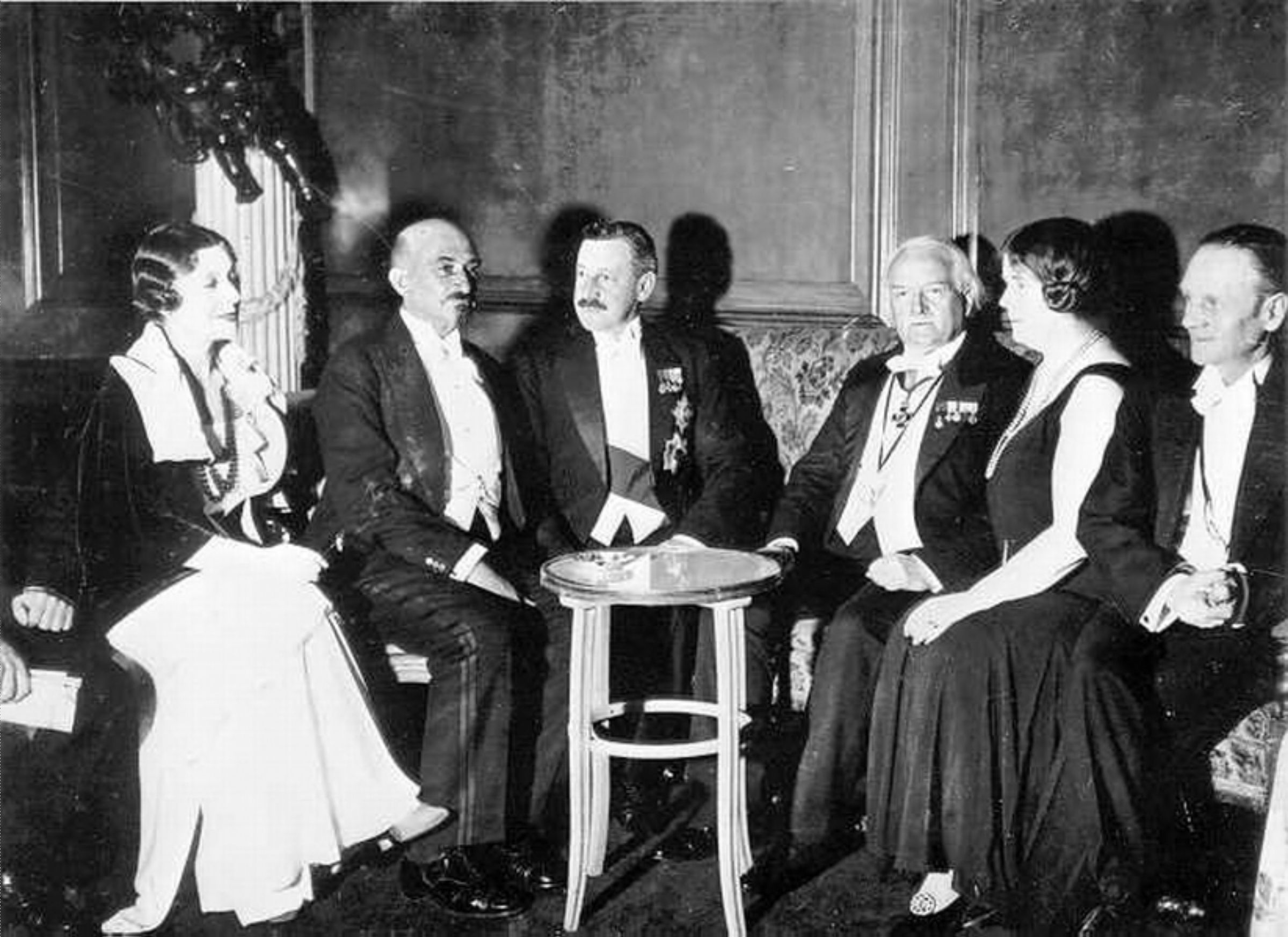
Vera Weizmann, Chaim Weizmann, Herbert Samuel, Lloyd George, Ethel Snowden, Philip Snowden

Weizmann's relations with Balfour were intellectual and academic. He was genuinely overjoyed to convince the former Prime Minister in April 1917. Just after the U.S. President, Woodrow Wilson, had left, the following morning, Lloyd George invited Weizmann to breakfast at which he promised Jewish support for Britain as the Jews "might be able to render more assistance than the Arabs." They discussed "International Control", the Russian Revolution and US involvement in the future of the Palestine Problem. The complexity of Arab desiderata – "facilities of colonization, communal autonomy, rights of language and establishment of a Jewish chartered company". This was followed by a meeting with Sir Edward Carson and the Conservatives (18 April) and another at Downing Street on 20 April. With the help of George's private secretary Philip Kerr the issue was moved up "the Agenda" to War Cabinet as a matter of urgency.

On 16 May 1917 the President of the Board of Deputies David Lindo Alexander QC co-signed a statement in the Times attacking Zionism and asserting that the Jewish Community in Britain was opposed to it. At the next meeting of the Board, on 15 June 1917, a motion of censure was proposed against the President, who said he would treat the motion as one of no confidence. When it was passed, he resigned. Although subsequent analysis has shown that the success of the motion possibly had more to do with a feeling on the part of Deputies that Lindo Alexander had failed to consult them than with a massive conversion on their part to the Zionist cause, nevertheless it had great significance outside the community. Within days of the resolution the Foreign Office sent a note to Lord Rothschild and to Weizmann asking them to submit their proposals for a Jewish homeland in Palestine. The way had been opened to the Balfour Declaration issued in the following November.

== Political career ==
On 31 October 1917, Chaim Weizmann became president of the British Zionist Federation; he worked with Arthur Balfour to obtain the Balfour Declaration.

His Majesty's government view would favour the establishment in Palestine of a national home for the Jewish people, ...to use their best endeavours to facilitate the achievement of this object, it being clearly understood that nothing shall be done which may prejudice the civil and religious rights of existing non-Jewish communities in Palestine, or the rights and political status enjoyed by Jews in any other country, 2 November 1917.

A founder of so-called Synthetic Zionism, Weizmann supported grass-roots colonization efforts as well as high-level diplomatic activity. He was generally associated with the centrist General Zionists and later sided with neither Labour Zionism on the left nor Revisionist Zionism on the right. In 1917, he expressed his view of Zionism in the following words,

We have [the Jewish people] never based the Zionist movement on Jewish suffering in Russia or in any other land. These suffering have never been the mainspring of Zionism. The foundation of Zionism was, and continues to be to this day, the yearning of the Jewish people for its homeland, for a national centre and a national life.

Weizmann's personality became an issue but Weizmann had an international profile unlike his colleagues or any other British Zionist. He was President of EZF Executive Council. He was also criticized by Harry Cohen. A London delegate raised a censure motion: that Weizmann refused to condemn the regiment. In August 1917, Weizmann quit both EZF and ZPC which he had founded with his friends. Leon Simon asked Weizmann not to "give up the struggle". At the meeting on 4 September 1917, he faced some fanatical opposition. But letters of support "sobering down" opposition, and a letter from his old friend Ginzberg "a great number of people regard you as something of a symbol of Zionism".

Zionists linked Sokolow and Weizmann to Sykes. Sacher tried to get the Foreign Secretary to redraft a statement rejecting Zionism. The irony was not lost accusing the government of anti-semitism. Edwin Montagu opposed it, but Herbert Samuel and David Lloyd George favoured Zionism. Montagu did not regard Palestine as a "fit place for them to live". Montagu believed that it would let down assimilationists and the ideals of British Liberalism. The Memorandum was not supposed to accentuate the prejudice of mentioning 'home of the Jewish people'. Weizmann was a key holder at the Ministry of Supply by late 1917. By 1918 Weizmann was accused of combating the idea of a separate peace with Ottoman Empire. He considered such a peace at odds with Zionist interests. He was even accused of "possibly prolonging the war".

At the War Cabinet meeting of 4 October, chaired by Lloyd George and with Balfour present, Lord Curzon also opposed this "barren and desolate" place as a home for Jews. In a third memo Montagu labelled Weizmann a "religious fanatic". Montagu believed in assimilation and saw his principles being swept from under by the new policy stance. Montagu, a British Jew, had learnt debating skills as India Secretary, and Liberalism from Asquith, who also opposed Zionism.

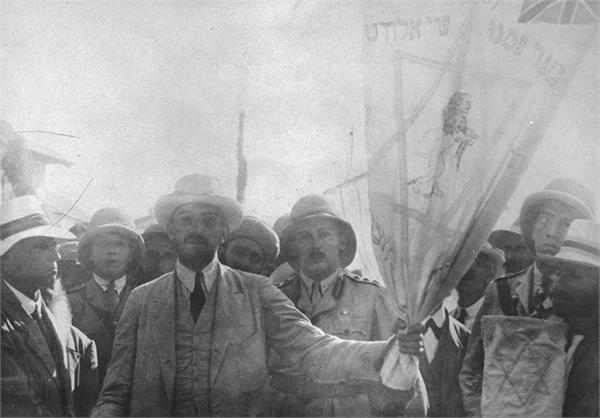
Weizmann holding a standard of the Jewish Legion, 1918

All the memos from Zionists, non-Zionists, and Curzon were all-in by a third meeting convened on Wednesday, 31 October 1917. The War Cabinet had dealt an "irreparable blow to Jewish Britons", wrote Montagu. Curzon's memo was mainly concerned by the non-Jews in Palestine to secure their civil rights. Worldwide there were 12 million Jews, and about 365000 in Palestine by 1932. Cabinet ministers were worried about Germany playing the Zionist card. If the Germans were in control, it would hasten support for Ottoman Empire, and collapse of Kerensky's government. Curzon went on towards an advanced Imperial view: that since most Jews had Zionist views, it was as well to support these majority voices. "If we could make a declaration favourable to such an ideal we should be able to carry on extremely useful propaganda." Weizmann "was absolutely loyal to Great Britain". The Zionists had been approached by the Germans, Weizmann told William Ormsby-Gore, but the British miscalculated the effects of immigration to Palestine and over-estimated German control over the Ottoman Empire. The Ottomans were in no position to prevent movement. Sykes reported the Declaration to Weizmann with elation all round: he repeated "mazel tov" over and over. The Entente had fulfilled its commitment to both Sharif Husein and Chaim Weizmann.

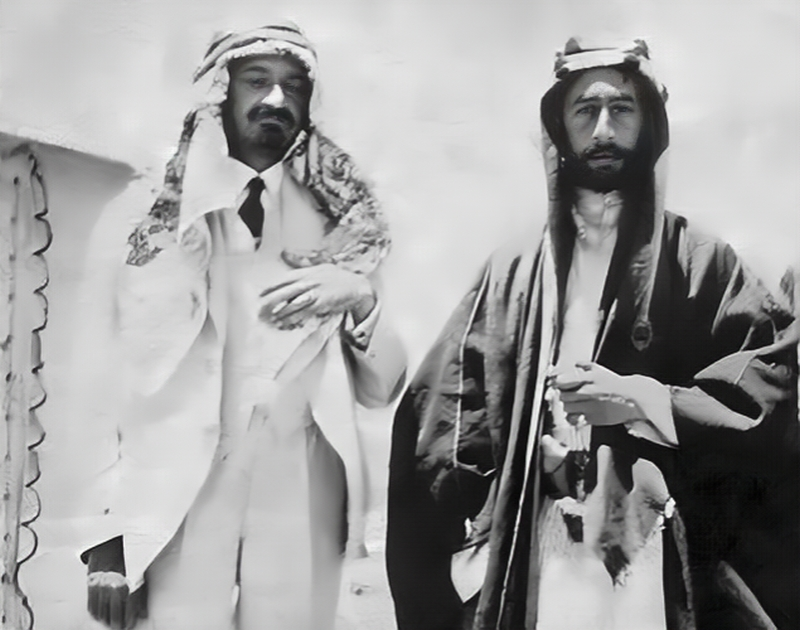
Weizmann (left) with Prince Faisal, later Faisal I of Iraq in Syria, 1918

Sykes stressed the Entente: "We are pledged to Zionism, Armenianism liberation, and Arabian independence". On 2 December, Zionists celebrated the Declaration at the Opera House; the news of the Bolshevik Revolution, and withdrawal of Russian troops from the frontier war with Ottoman Empire, raised the pressure from Constantinople. On 11 December, Turkish armies were swept aside when Edmund Allenby's troops entered Jerusalem. On 9 January 1918, all Turkish troops withdrew from the Hejaz for a bribe of $2 million to help pay Ottoman Empire's debts. Weizmann had seen peace with Ottoman Empire out of the question in July 1917. Lloyd George wanted a separate peace with Ottoman Empire to guarantee relations in the region secure. Weizmann had managed to gain the support of International Jewry in Britain, France and Italy. Schneer postulates that the British government desperate for any wartime advantage were prepared to offer any support among philo-Semites. It was to Weizmann a priority. Weizmann considered that the issuance of the Balfour Declaration was the greatest single achievement of the pre-1948 Zionists. He believed that the Balfour Declaration and the legislation that followed it, such as the (3 June 1922) Churchill White Paper and the League of Nations Mandate for Palestine all represented an astonishing accomplishment for the Zionist movement.

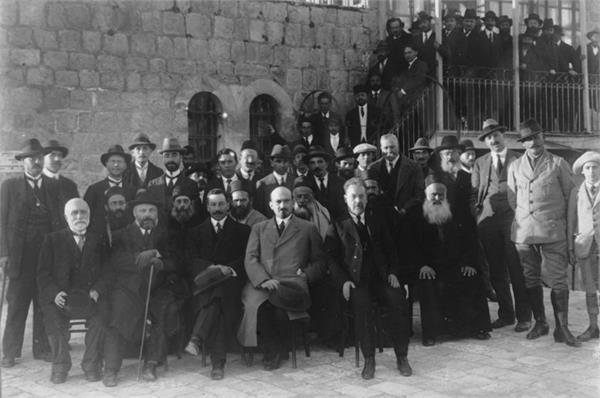
Weizmann in Jerusalem, 1920 (Herbert Samuel to his right)

On 3 January 1919, Weizmann met Hashemite Prince Faisal to sign the Faisal-Weizmann Agreement attempting to establish the legitimate existence of the state of Israel. At the end of the month, the Paris Peace Conference decided that the Arab provinces of the Ottoman Empire should be wholly separated and the newly conceived mandate-system applied to them. Weizmann stated at the conference that the Zionist objective was to "establish such a society in Palestine that Palestine shall be as Jewish as England is English, or America American." Shortly thereafter, both men made their statements to the conference.

After 1921, he assumed leadership in the World Zionist Organization, creating local branches in Berlin, and serving twice (1921–31, 1935–46) as president of the World Zionist Organization. Unrest amongst Arab antagonism to a Jewish presence in Palestine increased, erupting into riots. Weizmann remained loyal to Britain, tried to shift the blame onto dark forces. The French were commonly blamed for discontent, as scapegoats for Imperial liberalism. Zionists began to believe racism existed within the administration, which remained inadequately policed.

In 1921, Weizmann went along with Albert Einstein for a fundraiser to establish the Hebrew University in Jerusalem and support the Technion – Israel Institute of Technology. At this time, simmering differences over competing European and American visions of Zionism, and its funding of development versus political activities, caused Weizmann to clash with Louis Brandeis. In 1921 Weizmann played an important role in supporting Pinhas Rutenberg's successful bid to the British for an exclusive electric concession for Palestine, in spite of bitter personal and principled disputes between the two figures.

During the war years, Brandeis headed the precursor of the Zionist Organization of America, leading fund-raising for Jews trapped in Europe and Palestine. In early October 1914, the USS North Carolina arrived in Jaffa Harbor with money and supplies provided by Jacob Schiff, the American Jewish Committee, and the Provisional Executive Committee for General Zionist Affairs, then acting for the WZO, which had been rendered impotent by the war. Although Weizmann retained Zionist leadership, the clash led to a departure from Louis Brandeis's movement. By 1929, there were about 18000 members remaining in the ZOA, a massive decline from the high of 200000 reached during the peak Brandeis years. In summer 1930, these two factions and visions of Zionism, would come to a compromise largely on Brandeis's terms, with a restructured leadership for the ZOA. An American view is that Weizmann persuaded the British cabinet to support Zionism by presenting the benefits of having a presence in Palestine in preference to the French. Imperial interests on the Suez Canal as well as sympathy after the Holocaust were important factors for British support. Weizmann wrote in 1914:

Should Palestine fall within the British sphere of influence, and should Britain encourage a Jewish settlement there, as a British dependency, we could have in 20 to 30 years a million Jews out there ... they would ... form a very effective guard for the Suez Canal.

=== Jewish immigration to Palestine ===
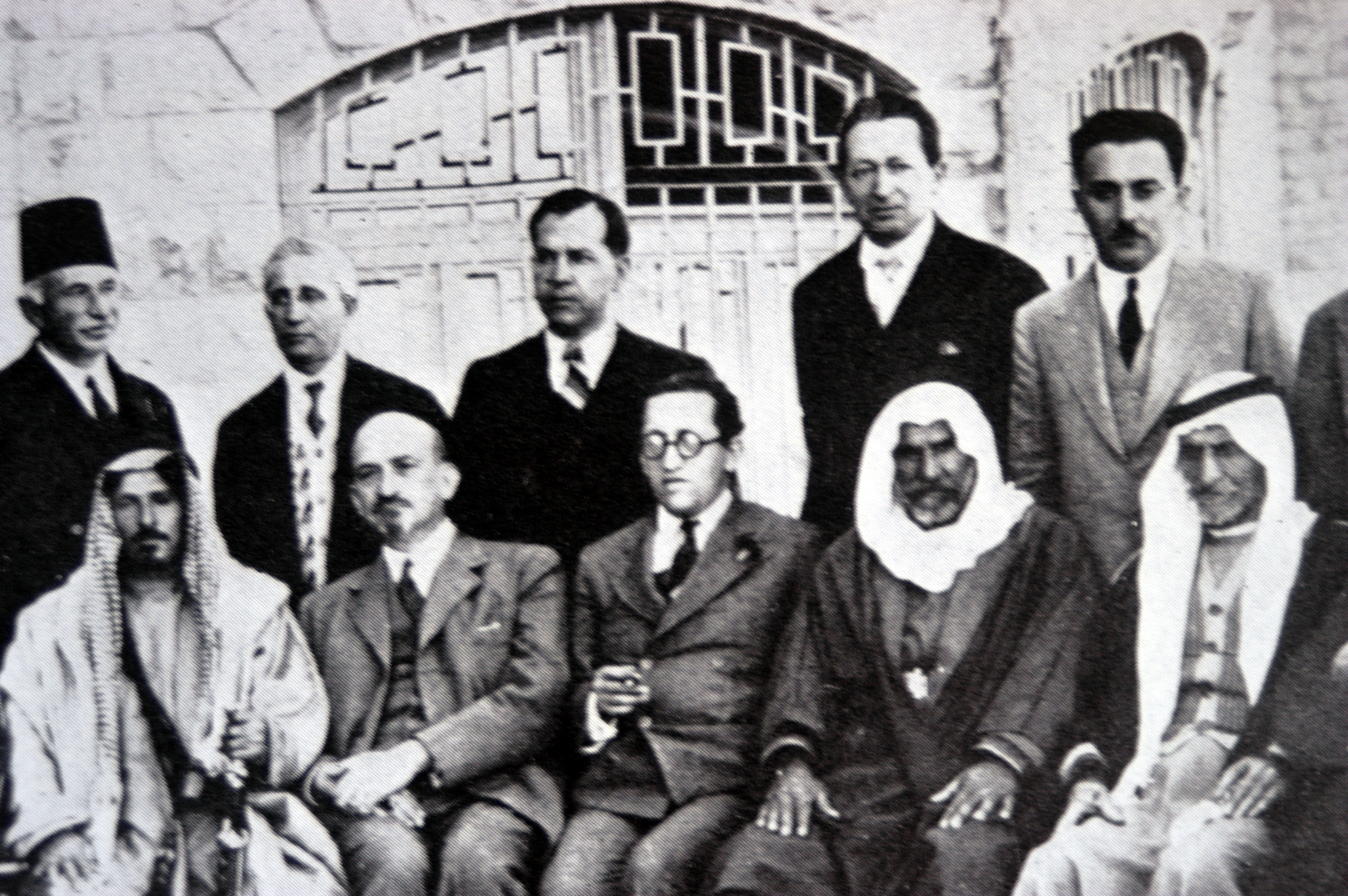
Chaim Weizmann (sitting, second from left) at a meeting with Arab leaders at the King David Hotel, Jerusalem, 1933. Also pictured are Haim Arlosoroff (sitting, center), Moshe Shertok (Sharett) (standing, right), and Yitzhak Ben-Zvi (standing, to Shertok's right).

Jewish immigration was consciously limited by the British administration. Weizmann agreed with the policy but was afraid of the rise of the Nazis. From 1933, there were year-on-year leaps in mass immigration by 50%. Prime Minister Ramsay MacDonald's attempted reassurance on economic grounds in a white paper did little to stabilize Arab-Israeli relations. In 1936 and early 1937, Weizmann addressed the Peel Commission (set up by the returning Conservative Prime Minister Stanley Baldwin), whose job it was to consider the working of the British Mandate of Palestine. He insisted that the mandate authorities had not driven home to the Palestinian population that the terms of the mandate would be implemented, using an analogy from another part of the British Empire:

I think it was in Bombay recently, that there had been trouble and the Moslems had been flogged. I am not advocating flogging, but what is the difference between a Moslem in Palestine and a Moslem in Bombay? There they flog them, and here they save their faces. This, interpreted in terms of Moslem mentality, means: "The British are weak; we shall succeed if we make ourselves sufficiently unpleasant. We shall succeed in throwing the Jews into the Mediterranean."

On 25 November 1936, testifying before the Peel Commission, Weizmann said that there were in Europe 6000000 Jews "for whom the world is divided into places where they cannot live and places where they cannot enter." The Commission published a report that, for the first time, recommended partition, but the proposal was declared unworkable and formally rejected by the government. The two main Jewish leaders, Weizmann and David Ben-Gurion had convinced the Zionist Congress to approve equivocally the Peel recommendations as a basis for more negotiation. This was the first official mention and declaration of a Zionist vision opting for a possible State with a majority of Jewish population, alongside a State with an Arab majority. The Arab leaders, headed by Haj Amin al-Husseini, rejected the plan.

Weizmann made very clear in his autobiography that the failure of the international Zionist movement (between the wars) to encourage all Jews to act decisively and efficiently in great enough numbers to migrate to the Jerusalem area was the real cause for the call for a Partition deal. A deal on partition was first formally mentioned in 1936 but not finally implemented until 1948. Again, Weizmann blamed the Zionist movement for not being adequate during the best years of the British Mandate.

Ironically, in 1936 Ze'ev Jabotinsky prepared the so-called "evacuation plan", which called for the evacuation of 1.5 million Jews from Poland, the Baltic states, Nazi Germany, Hungary and Romania to Palestine over the span of next ten years. The plan was first proposed on 8 September 1936 in the conservative Polish newspaper Czas, the day after Jabotinsky organized a conference where more details of the plan were laid out; the emigration would take 10 years and would include 750000 Jews from Poland, with 75000 between age of 20–39 leaving the country each year. Jabotinsky stated that his goal was to reduce Jewish population in the countries involved to levels that would make them uninterested in its further reduction.

The same year, he toured Eastern Europe, meeting with the Polish Foreign Minister, Colonel Józef Beck; the Regent of Hungary, Admiral Miklós Horthy; and Prime Minister Gheorghe Tătărescu of Romania to discuss the evacuation plan. The plan gained the approval of all three governments, but caused considerable controversy within the Jewish community of Poland, on the grounds that it played into the hands of anti-Semites. In particular, the fact that the 'evacuation plan' had the approval of the Polish government was taken by many Polish Jews as indicating Jabotinsky had gained the endorsement of what they considered to be the wrong people.

The evacuation of Jewish communities in Poland, Hungary and Romania was to take place over a ten-year period. However, the British government vetoed it, and the World Zionist Organization's chairman, Chaim Weizmann, dismissed it.

=== Second World War ===
On 29 August 1939, Weizmann sent a letter to Neville Chamberlain, stating in part: "I wish to confirm in the most explicit manner the declarations which I and my colleagues have made during the last month and especially in the last week: that the Jews stand by Great Britain and will fight on the side of the democracies." The letter gave rise to a conspiracy theory, promoted in Nazi propaganda, that he had made a "Jewish declaration of war" against Germany.

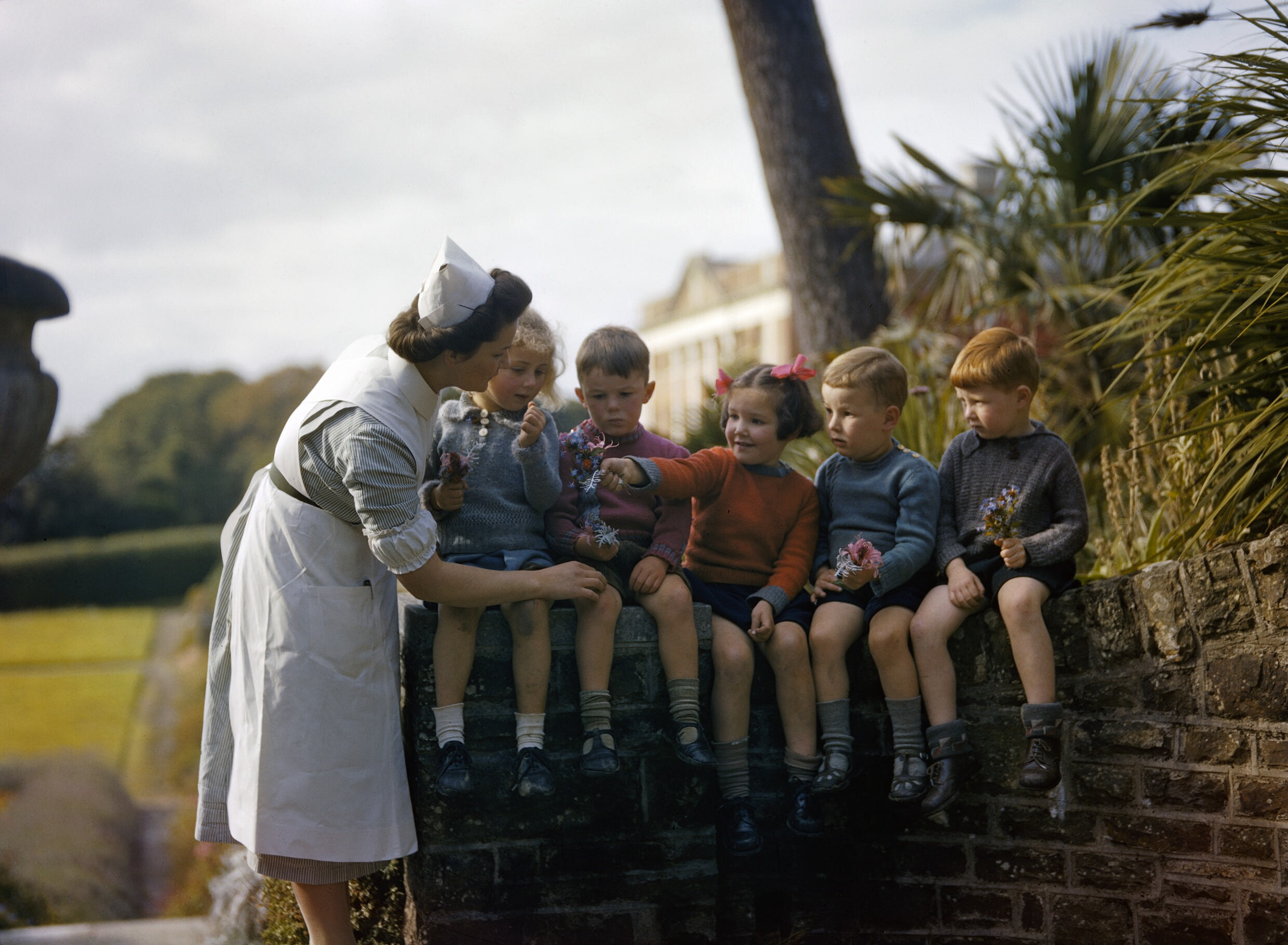
A nurse with child evacuees from Plymouth in the garden of Weizmann's home at Tapley Park in the English village of Instow, north Devon, 1942

At the outbreak of war in Europe in 1939, Weizmann was appointed as an honorary adviser to the British Ministry of Supply, using his extensive political expertise in the management of provisioning and supplies throughout the duration of the conflict. He was frequently asked to advise the cabinet and also brief the Prime Minister. Weizmann's efforts to integrate Jews from Palestine in the war against Germany resulted in the creation of the Jewish Brigade of the British Army which fought mainly in the Italian front. After the war, he grew embittered by the rise of violence in Palestine and by the terrorist tendencies amongst followers of the Revisionist fraction. His influence within the Zionist movement decreased, yet he remained overwhelmingly influential outside of Mandate Palestine.

In 1942, Weizmann was invited by President Franklin D. Roosevelt to work on the problem of synthetic rubber. Weizmann proposed to produce butyl alcohol from maize, then convert it to butylene and further to butadiene, which is a basis for rubber. According to his memoirs, these proposals were barred by the oil companies.

=== The Holocaust ===
In 1939, a conference was established at St James's Palace when the government drew up the May 1939 White Paper which severely curtailed any spending in the Jewish Home Land. Yishuv was put back to the lowest priority. At the outbreak of war the Jewish Agency pledged its support for the British war effort against Nazi Germany. They raised the Jewish Brigade into the British Army, which took years to come to fruition. It authenticated the news of the Holocaust reaching the allies.

In May 1942, the Zionists met at Biltmore Hotel in New York, US; a convention at which Weizmann pressed for a policy of unrestricted immigration into Palestine. A Jewish Commonwealth needed to be established, and latterly Churchill revived his backing for this project.

Weizmann met Churchill on 4 November 1944 to urgently discuss the future of Palestine. Churchill agreed that Partition was preferable for Israel over his White Paper. He also agreed that Israel should annex the Negev desert.

In February 1943, the British government also rejected a plan to pay $3.5 million and just $50 per head to allow 70000, mostly Romanian, Jews to be protected and evacuated that Weizmann had suggested to the Americans. In May 1944, the British detained Joel Brand, a Jewish activist from Budapest, who wanted to evacuate 1 million Jews from Hungary on 10000 trucks, with tea, coffee, cocoa, and soap. In July 1944, Weizmann pleaded on Brand's behalf but to no avail. Rezső Kasztner took over the direct negotiations with Adolf Eichmann to release migrants, but they came to nothing. Weizmann also promoted a plan to bomb the death camps, but the British claimed that this was too risky, dangerous and unfeasible, due to technical difficulties. On 20 September 1945, Weizmann presented the first official documents to the British, USA, France, and Soviets, for the restitution of property, and indemnification. He demanded that all heirless Jewish property should be handed over as part of the reparations for the rehabilitation of Nazi victims.

In his presidential statement at the last Zionist congress that he attended at Basel on 9 December 1946 he said: "Massada, for all its heroism, was a disaster in our history; It is not our purpose or our right to plunge to destruction in order to bequeath a legend of martyrdom to posterity; Zionism was to mark the end of our glorious deaths and the beginning of a new path leading to life."

== First president of Israel ==
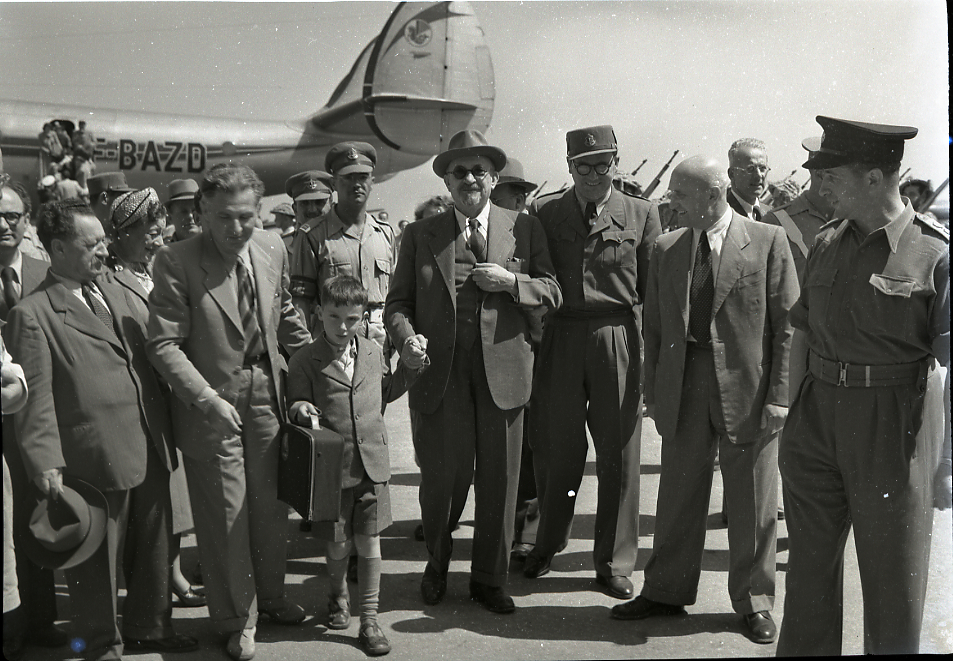
Weizmann in the airport in Israel, 1949

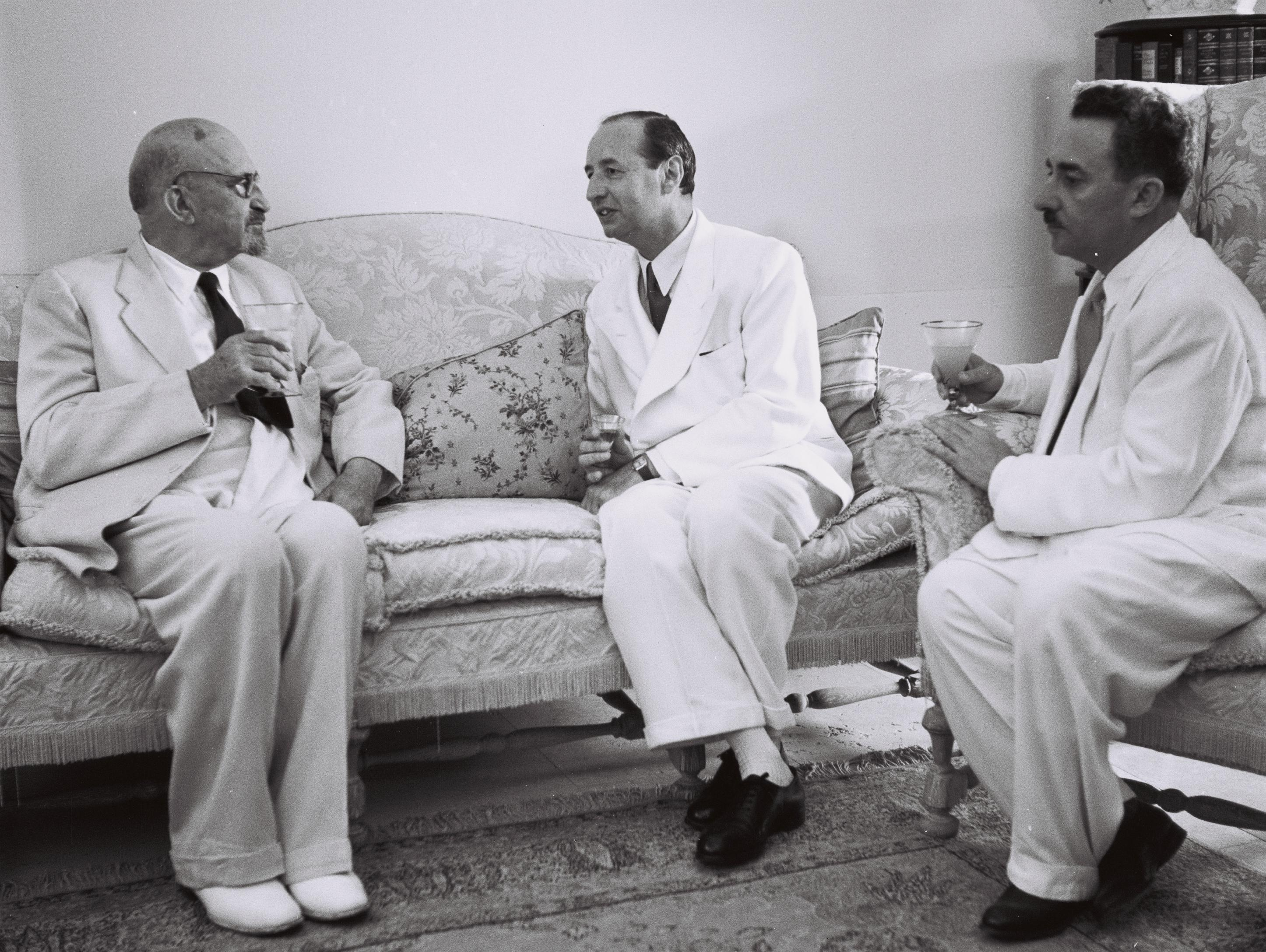
Weizmann (left) with first Turkish ambassador to Israel, Seyfullah Esin (c), and Foreign Minister Moshe Sharett, 1950

Two days after the proclamation of the State of Israel, Weizmann succeeded Ben-Gurion as chairman of the Provisional State Council, a collective presidency that held office until Israel's first parliamentary election, in February 1949.

On 2 July 1948, a new kibbutz was founded facing the Golan Heights (Syrian) overlooking the Jordan River, only 5 miles from Syrian territory. Their forces had already seized Kibbutz Mishmar Ha-Yarden. The new kibbutz was named (President's Village) Kfar Ha-Nasi.

When the first Knesset met in 1949, Weizmann was nominated as Mapai's candidate for president. The Revisionist Party put forward Prof. Joseph Klausner. Weizmann was elected president by the Knesset on 17 February 1949. On 24 February 1949, Weizmann as president entrusted Ben-Gurion with forming a government. A Coalition was made up of 46 Mapai, 2 Arab Democratic List of Nazareth, 16 of United Religious Front, 5 of Progressive Party, 4 of Sephardi List. Mapam was officially a socialist party with Mapai, but was anti-religious and so remained outside the coalition. On 2 November 1949, the anniversary of the Balfour Declaration, the Daniel Sieff Institute, much enlarged and rebuilt, was renamed the Weizmann Institute of Science. The institute was a global success, attracting scientists from all over the Diaspora. In 1949 there were 20 researchers; twenty years later there were 400, and 500 students. Weizmann met with United States President Harry Truman and worked to obtain the support of the United States; they discussed emigration, for the establishment of the State of Israel.

President Weizmann lived at Rehovot, where he regularly received the Prime Minister David Ben-Gurion into his garden. He was denied any actualisation of the political role he had hoped for by the Left, and had to be consoled with the Weizmann Institute's successes.

When Weizmann died on 9 November 1952, he was buried at Rehovot. He was acknowledged as a patriot long before Israel had even begun to exist. "The greatest Jewish emissary to the Gentile world..." was one academic verdict.

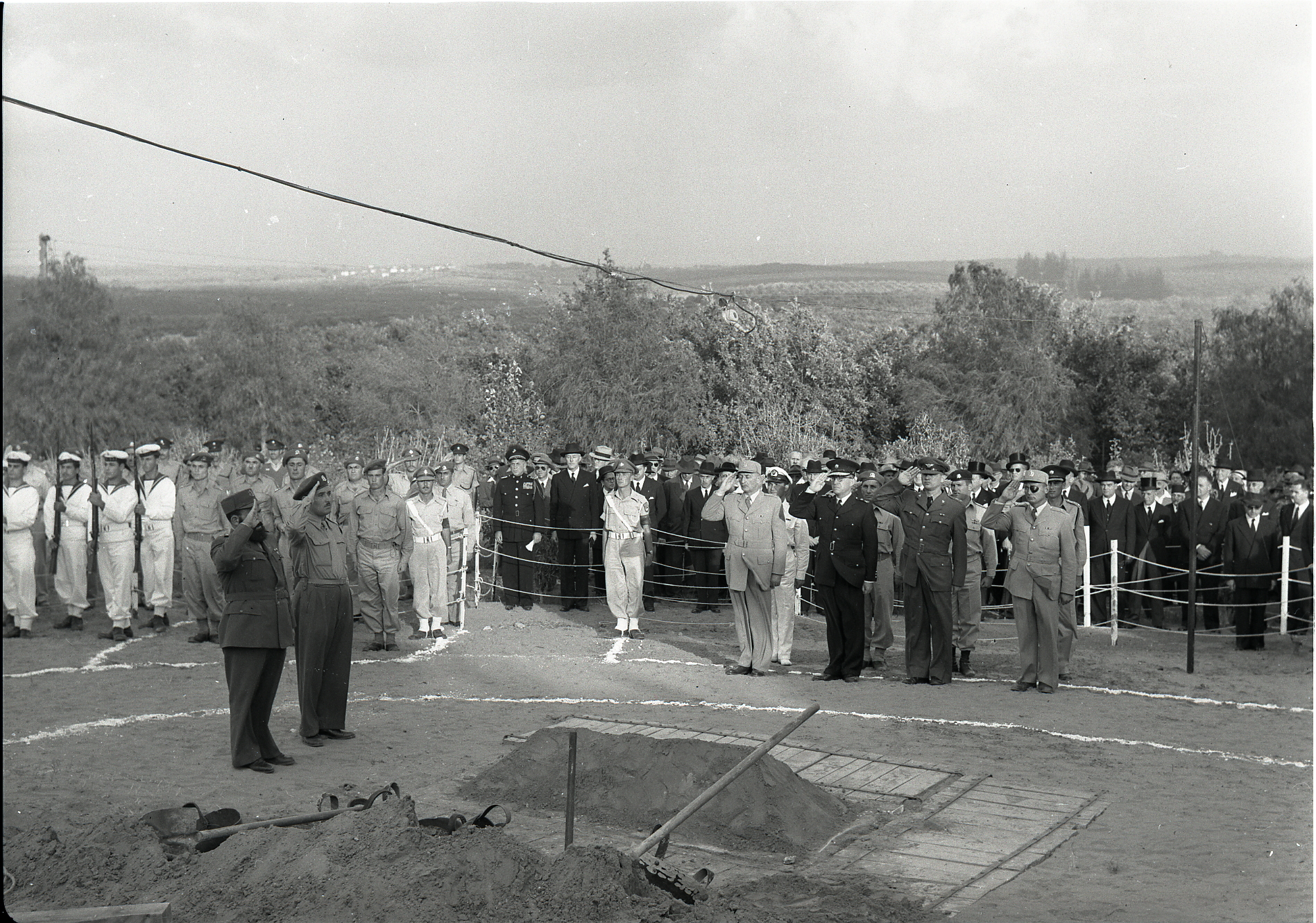
Weizmann's funeral in 1952

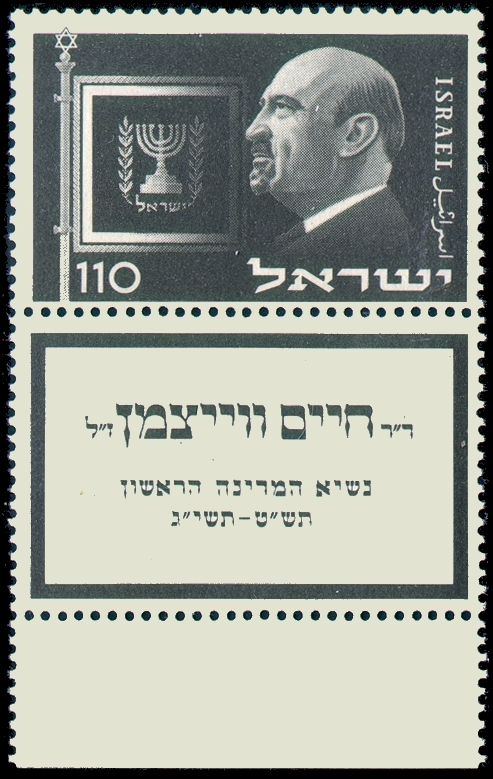
Weizmann memorial stamp issued in December 1952

== Published works ==
- Weizmann, Chaim (1918). What is Zionism. London.
- — (1949). Trial and Error: The Autobiography of Chaim Weizmann. Jewish Publication Society of America.
- — (1949). Autobiography: Chaim Weizmann. London: Hamilton Ltd.
- — (January 1942). "Palestine's role in the solution of the Jewish Problem". Foreign Affairs. 20 (2): 324–338. doi:10.2307/20029153. JSTOR 20029153.
- Herzog, Chaim (1996). Living History: a Memoir. Plunkett Lake Press. ASIN B013FPVJ42
