= Maria Weizmann =

Sister of Chaim Weizmann (1893–1974)

Maria Weizmann (Russian: Мари́я Ве́йцман, Hebrew: מריה ויצמן; 1893–1974) was a sister of Russian-Israeli politician and scientist Chaim Weizmann (the first President of the State of Israel). She graduated from a university in Switzerland and worked as a doctor in Moscow from 1915.

Maria Weizman and her husband V.M. Savitsky were long denied the right to emigrate from the Soviet Union by the authorities. Her husband was arrested in 1949.

On February 10, 1953 she was arrested in connection with the alleged Doctors' plot. Her case was handled by the GRU (as opposed to MGB as it was common), an evidence of its importance to the Soviet regime.

After Joseph Stalin's death and the admission by the Soviet leadership that the "plot" was made up, she was still kept in Lubyanka prison, and released only on August 12, 1953. Weizmann emigrated to Israel in 1956.

She was officially rehabilitated after Perestroika in 1989.
