= Haim Wasserzug =

Rev. Haim Wasserzug

Personal life
- Born: 1822 Sieradz, Prussian Poland
- Died: 24 August 1882 (aged 59–60) Brighton, England, United Kingdom
- Buried: West Ham Jewish Cemetery
- Children: 12

Religious life
- Religion: Judaism
- Synagogue: North London Synagogue
- Position: Ḥazzan
- Began: 1867
- Ended: 1882
- Residence: Konin (1840); Novy-Dvor (1841–54); Łomża (1854–59); Vilna (1859–67); London (1867–82)

Haim Wasserzug (Yiddish: חיים וואסערצוג, romanized: Ḥayyim Vasertsug; 1822 – 24 August 1882), also known as Haim Lomzer (Yiddish: חיים לאָמזער), was an English ḥazzan and composer. He is recognised for pioneering the use of choral arrangements in synagogue services and was the first cantor of the North London Synagogue. Some of the principal cantors of the European continent and of America were numbered among his disciples.

== Biography ==
Wasserzug was born in Sieradz, in the Prussian partition of Poland, in 1822, where his father served as cantor. Endowed with a sweet voice, he was elected ḥazzan at Konin at the age of eighteen. His career in Poland and Lithuania included controversial reforms, such as introducing four-part harmony into synagogue worship, which drew criticism from Ḥasidic factions. His subsequent positions included posts at Novy-Dvor, Lonisa, and eventually the Great Synagogue of Vilna.

In 1867, upon the opening of the North London Synagogue, Wasserzug was appointed its first cantor (First Reader), a position he held until his death in 1882. During this period, he lived at 33 Thornhill Road, Barnsbury, a Victorian terraced house in Islington which still stands and is part of a protected conservation area.

In 1878, Wasserzug published Sefer shire mikdash, a collection of 143 choral compositions written during his years in Vilna and London. The volume received praise from European musical figures such as Nikolai Zaremba, Frederic Weber, and Henry Wylde. Among the pieces is his well-known setting of Zokhrenu l'ḥayyim. Some of his compositions were later included in The Voice of Prayer and Praise, a widely used anthology of synagogue music in British Orthodox communities.

He died on 24 August 1882 at the Royal Sussex County Hospital in Brighton, following complications from sea bathing. He was survived by his wife Rebecca née Woyduslawski, their ten children, and five additional children from his first marriage to her sister, Rachel.

== Personal life ==
Wasserzug's daughter Sara married Rev. Abraham Levinson, long-serving minister of the Middle Street Synagogue in Brighton. His son David Wasserzug was educated at Jews' College, London and served as a rabbi in Cardiff, Port Elizabeth, Johannesburg, and later at Dalston Synagogue, London. Another son, William, studied at the University of Music and Theatre Leipzig and became Choirmaster at the Bayswater Synagogue. His youngest son, Israel (later known as Ivor Warren), was Choirmaster at the Liberal Jewish Synagogue in St John's Wood.

== Legacy ==
Beyond his musical influence, Wasserzug’s tenure in Barnsbury marked a period of growth and modernisation in Anglo-Jewish liturgical music. His former residence at 33 Thornhill Road has become a point of historical interest in Islington local history.

== Publications ==
- Sefer shire mikdash: Ancient and Modern Synagogue Music [Songs of the Sanctuary]. London: Weekes and Coy. 1878.
