= Étienne Wasserzug =

French biologist (1860–1888)

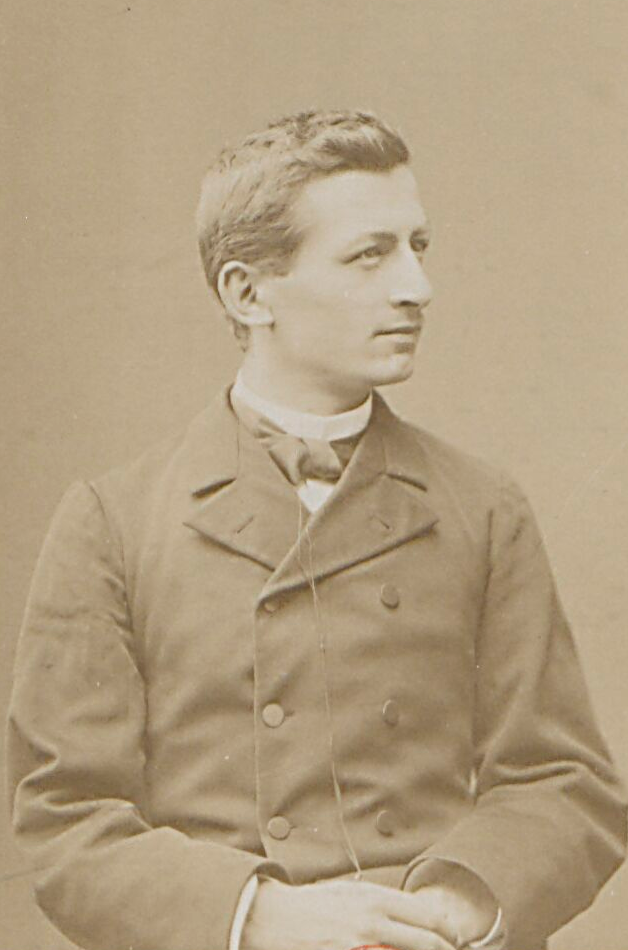
- Born: 8 January 1860; Motol, Russian Empire (now Belarus)
- Died: 1888 (aged 27–28); Paris, France
- Known for: Leçons sur les bactéries
- Scientific career
- Fields: Biology (fungi, morphology and physiology of bacteria)
- Workplaces: Lycée Saint-Louis

Étienne Bronislaw Wasserzug (8 January 1860 in Motol – 31 March 1888) was a French biologist of Polish origin. He worked on microbiology with Louis Pasteur but died young from scarlet fever.

== Biography ==
Wasserzug's father, a physician and landowner, escaped from Poland to Switzerland after he was sentenced to death for taking part in the Polish uprising of 1863–1870 against Russia. Etienne and his father moved to Neuchâtel (Switzerland), and hid in le-Saunier (Jura, France). During the 1870–1871 conflict with Prussia, his father enlisted as a medical officer in the French army. After the war, disillusioned with the attitude of the French administration, he entrusted his son to a woman patient and left to America. Etienne never saw any of his family members again. In 1877 he lived in Budapest (Hungary), where he accepted a position as tutor in a wealthy Hungarian family. In 1879 he went to France and taught at a high school in Besançon, and then in college Salins (Jura). He prepared for the entrance to the "Ecole Normale Supérieure" while also serving as a teacher from 1881 at the Lycée Saint-Louis (Paris). He joined the "Ecole Normale" the next year and studied natural history. In 1885 he worked at the laboratory of Louis Pasteur working on the production of «Invertin» and studied some fungi, morphology and the physiology of bacteria and fungi. He also worked on a rabies treatment. He was fluent in several languages including Latin, English, German, Spanish, Hungarian, Italian, and Russian, and Slavic. He was working towards a doctorate and also got married. He had a son when he fell sick. He died from Scarlet Fever while being treated by Alexandre Yersin. A funeral speech was given by Pasteur on Easter Sunday, 1888.
