= Ben-Zion Mossinson =

- בן-ציון מוסינזון
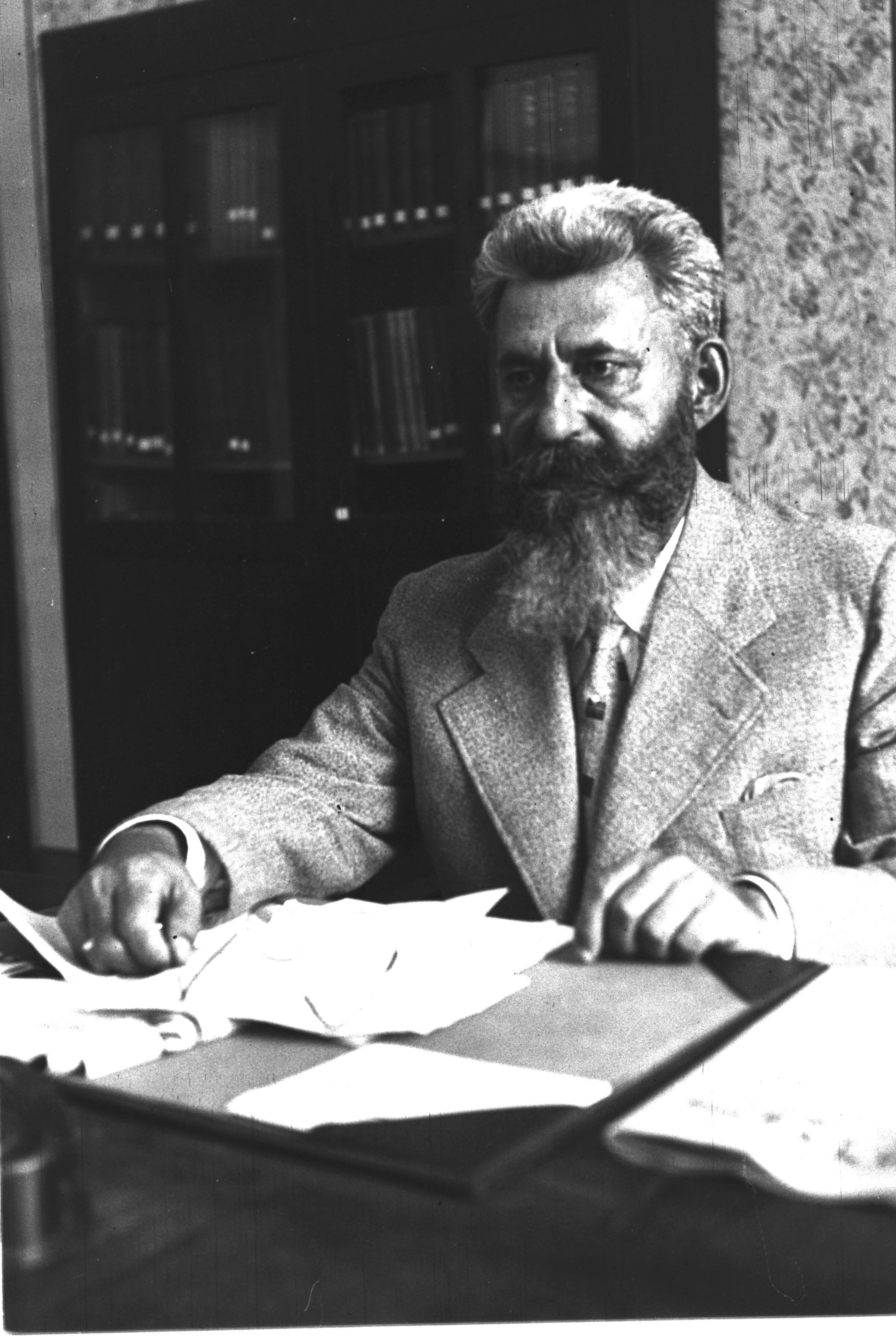
- May 1936
- Born: 26 April 1878; Russia
- Died: 23 November 1942 (aged 64); Jerusalem, Mandatory Palestine

Ben-Zion Mossinson (Hebrew: בן-ציון מוסינזון; 26 April 1878 – 23 November 1942) was a Zionist leader.

== Biography ==
Ben-Zion Mossinson was born on 26 April 1878 in Russia. His father was a rabbinic judge.

He was the founder and principal of the Herzliya Hebrew Gymnasium, the first Hebrew high school in Tel Aviv.

Mossinson died on 23 November 1942 in Jerusalem.
