= Yaniv Iczkovits =

Israeli writer (born 1975)

- יניב איצקוביץ'
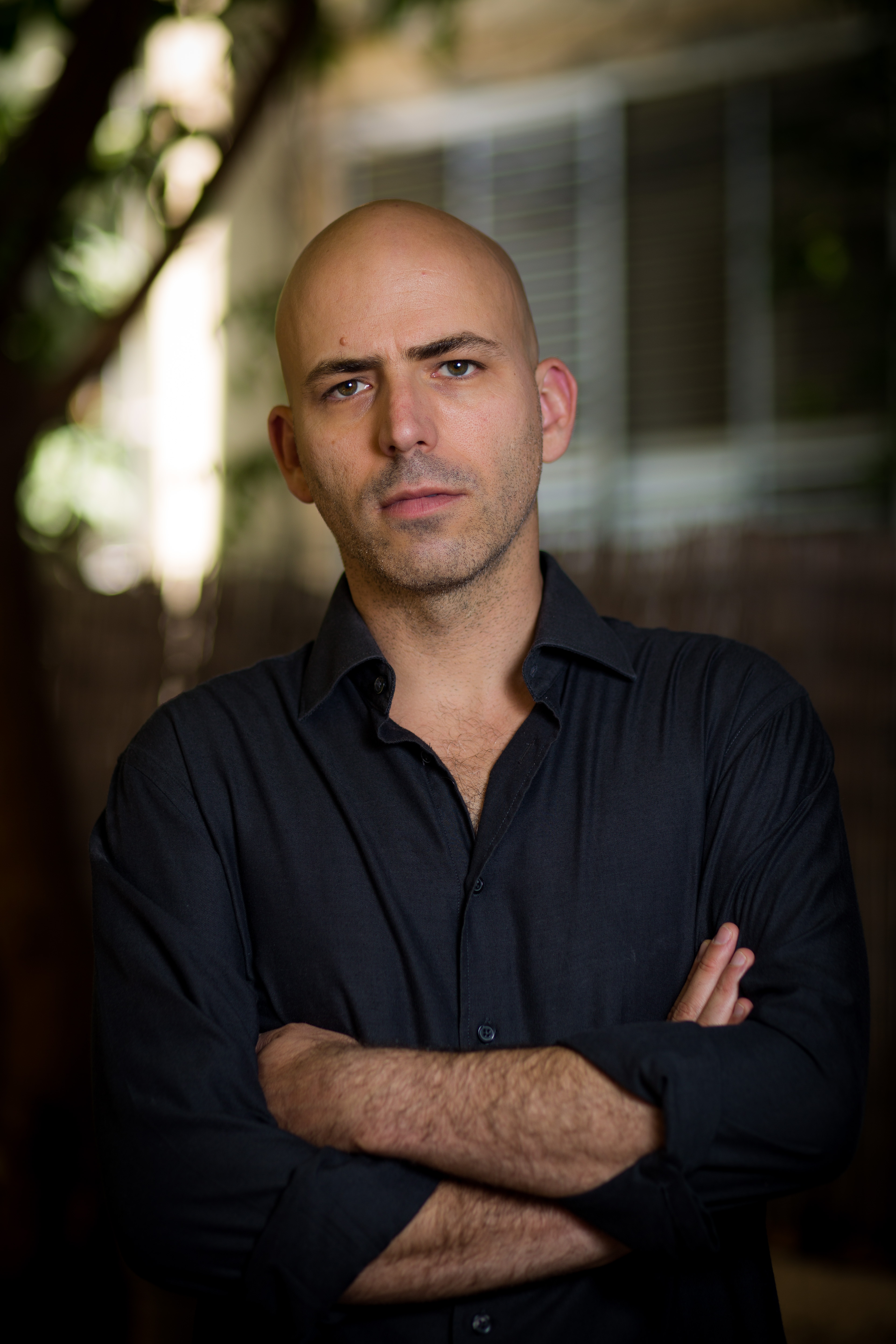
- Born: May 2, 1975 (age 51); Beer-Sheba, Israel
- Education: Tel Aviv University; University of Oxford; Columbia University
- Occupations: Writer, university lecturer
- Writing career
- Language: Hebrew
- Genres: novels; essays; philosophy
- Notable awards: 2007–Haaretz Books award for first published work; 2010–Prime Minister's Prize for Hebrew Literary Works; 2016–Ramat Gan Prize for Literature; Agnon Prize; 2021–Wingate Literary Prize; 2021-2–Artist in Residence at the IIAS; 2024–French Wizo Prix

Yaniv Iczkovits (Hebrew: יניב איצקוביץ'; born May 2, 1975) is an Israeli writer known for his novels, essays and philosophical work. His 2015 fantasy-historical adventure novel The Slaughterman's Daughter, with an unlikely assortment of Jewish characters on a quest in late 19th century Czarist Russia, has been translated into several European languages and gained critical acclaim.

== Early life and education ==
Iczkovits was born in Beersheba and grew up in Rishon Lezion. His grandparents immigrated to Mandatory Palestine after the Holocaust, from Hungary, Czechoslovakia, and Romania. One grandfather was a survivor of the Auschwitz concentration camp.

In 1993, he enlisted in the IDF, volunteered for the Maglan elite commando unit and served as an officer. As a team commander he took part in the fighting in southern Lebanon. Upon his discharge from the IDF with the rank of lieutenant, he traveled to the Far East. He enrolled in the Adi Lautman Interdisciplinary Program for Outstanding Students at Tel Aviv University for his undergraduate studies, and during his master's degree he spent a year as a Chevening fellow at Oxford University. His doctoral dissertation dealt with Ludwig Wittgenstein's thought and analyzed the interplay between ethics and language.

== Academic career ==
He taught for eight years at the University of Tel Aviv's Philosophy Department. After receiving his PhD, he went on to pursue postdoctoral research at Columbia University in New York City, where he adapted his doctoral dissertation into the book Wittgenstein's Ethical Thought.

For the academic year 2021/2022, Iczkovits was appointed to serve as artist in residence at the Israel Institute for Advanced Studies at the Hebrew University of Jerusalem, a position previously held by poet Agi Mishol and playwright Joshua Sobol.

== Views and positions ==
In 2002, after a stint of reservist service in Gaza during the Second Intifada, Iczkovits, together with social activist David Zonsheine, initiated the "Combatants' Letter," in which they declared their refusal to serve in the territories of Judea, Samaria and the Gaza Strip. An initial 51 soldiers and officers signed the letter, which was published as an advertisement in the mass-circulation daily newspaper Haaretz. This launched the movement known as Ometz LeSarev (Hebrew: "Courage to refuse"). Some six hundred Israeli soldiers affirmed their refusal to serve in the occupied territories. Iczkovits spent a month in military prison for refusing to go on additional reserve service in the territories.

During the Gaza war, he rejoined the army to fight Hamas even rejecting the occupation and Israeli extremism. Iczkovits also blames the Netanyahu government and the Israeli left for their attitudes to Hamas.

== Personal life ==
Iczkovits lives with his wife and three daughters in Tel Aviv.

== Awards and nominations ==
=== Awards ===
- 2007 – Inaugural Haaretz Books Prize for his first book, Pulse
- 2010 – Prime Minister's Prize for Hebrew Literary Works (Levi Eshkol Prize), for Adam and Sophie
- 2015 – Funding from the Ministry of Culture and Sport's People of the Book award for translation of Hebrew literature into foreign languages, for The Slaughterman's Daughter"
- 2016 – The Ramat Gan Prize for Literature awarded for "literary excellence in the original novel category" for The Slaughterman's Daughter
- 2016 – Inaugural award of the Agnon Prize for the Literary Arts, for The Slaughterman's Daughter
- 2021 – The Jewish Quarterly-Wingate Prize for The Slaughterman's Daughter

=== Shortlisted ===
- 2017 – The Slaughterman's Daughter: shortlisted for the Sapir Prize
- 2021 – No One Leaves Palo Alto: shortlisted for the Sapir Prize

=== Reviewers' notable mention for The Slaughterman's Daughter ===
- 2020 – The Economist – among the eight "Books of the Year" list
- 2020 – The Times – among the ten "Books of the Year"
- 2021 – Kirkus Reviews – "One of the 10 fiction books to look forward to in 2021"
- 2021 – Publishers Weekly – "Best Books"

=== The Slaughterman's Daughter reviewed by the major press ===
- 2021 – The Wall Street Journal – "Fiction: ‘In Memory of Memory’ Review"
- 2021 – The New York Times – "Chasing Down a Deadbeat Dad, With a Knife Strapped to Her Leg"

== Publications ==
=== Nonfiction ===
- Wittgenstein's Ethical Thought (Based on his doctoral dissertation), London, Palgrave Macmillan,ISBN 978-1-137-02636-1; 2012 .
- Convicts and Heroes: Wittgensteinian Afterthoughts on Uri Barabash's 'In Clean Conscience' and 'Double Alpha'. Article published by The Free Library, 2017

=== Fiction ===
- Dofeq (Pulse), Hakibbutz Hameuchad Publishing, 2007, Danacode 310004255
  - in Italian: Batticuore, 2010, Giuntina, ISBN 8880573616; translated by Antonio Di Gesù
- Adam and Sophie, Hakibbutz Hameuchad – Siman Kriya, 2009, Danacode 310004656
- Dinei Yerusha (Laws of Inheritance, novella), Achuzat Bayit Publishing, 2010, ISBN 9657340594
- Tikkun Ahar Hatzot (An After Midnight Prayer), Keter Publishing, 2015, ISBN 9789650723729
  - in Italian: Tikkun o la vendetta di Mende Speismann per mano della sorella Fanny, 2018, Neri Pozza Editore, ISBN 8854515965; translated by Ofra Bannet and Raffaella Scardi
  - in Dutch: De Slachtersdochter, 2019, De Geus, ISBN 9044539329; translated by Hilde Pach
  - in English (U.K. edition): The Slaughterman's Daughter: The Avenging of Mende Speissman by the Hand of her Sister Fanny, 2020, MacLehose Press, ISBN 0857058274; translated by Orr Scharf
  - in English (U.S. edition): The Slaughterman's Daughter: A novel, Feb. 23, 2021, Schocken Books, ISBN 9780805243659; translated by Orr Scharf
  - in Polish: Córka rzeźnika, October 2021, Wydawnictwo Poznańskie, ISBN 0857058274; translated by Anna Halbersztat
- Af Echad Lo Ozev et Palo Alto (Nobody Leaves Palo Alto), Keter Publishing, 2020, Danacode 10-279193
