= Count Andrew Ciechanowiecki =

Polish-British nobleman

His Excellency The Count Ciechanowiecki GCSG GCStJ FSA
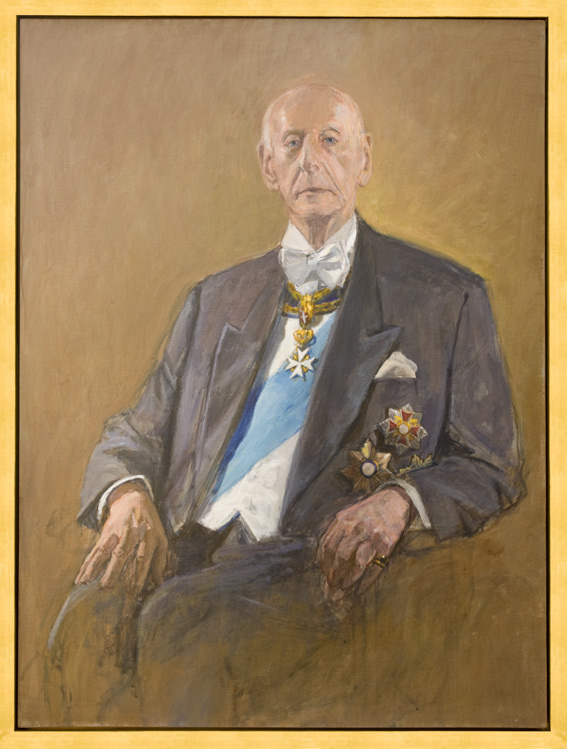
- Portrait by Andrzej Okinczyc, 2009
- Born: Andrzej Stanisław Ciechanowiecki; 28 September 1924; Warsaw, Poland
- Died: 2 November 2015 (aged 91); London, England
- Buried: Knights of Malta Crypt, St Maximilian Kolbe's Chapel, Krakow, Poland
- Noble family: Osiecimska-Hutten-Czapska (Matrilineal)
- Occupation: Art historian; Diplomat
- Military career
- Education: Jagiellonian University (MA); University of Tübingen (DPhil)
- Allegiance: Poland
- Service years: 1942–Prior to 1945
- Unit: Home Army

Andrew Stanislaus Ciechanowiecki, Count Ciechanowiecki (28 September 1924 – 2 November 2015) was a British Polish-born nobleman, diplomat, and art historian. He was considered an authority on French baroque sculpture in the second half of the 20th century.

== Early life ==
Andrzej Stanislaw Ciechanowiecki was born in Warsaw in 1924, the only child of Andrzej Ciechanowiecki, a Polish diplomat, and Matilda "Tilly" Maria, Countess Osiecimska-Hutten-Czapska, a prominent figure in the elite social circles of pre-war Warsaw. On his father's side, he came from an impoverished Masovian szlachta noble and senatorial family, established in Belarus, and who had recently lost their landed estates as a result of the Treaty of Riga in 1921. He had spent his early childhood in Budapest, where his father died at the early age of 37 while working at the Polish embassy, obliging the family to return to Warsaw. There he attended the Mikołaj Rey Primary School followed by the Stefan Batory Gimnazjum & Liceum. The household came to be dominated by his widowed mother and maternal grandmother and their social connections.

== Second World War ==
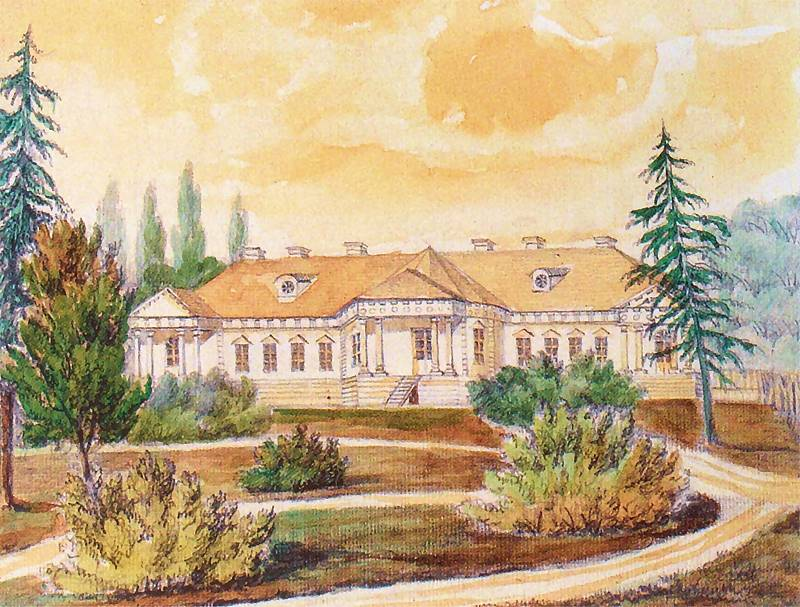
Skirmunt Palace in Mołodów, watercolour by Napoleon Orda 1864

The German invasion of Poland began on 1 September 1939. On the advice of the British general, Sir Adrian Carton de Wiart, resident in Poland, on 5 September, the family fled East to Mołodów, on the estate of Henryk Skirmunt and his sister, Maria, the younger siblings of Konstanty Skirmunt, Polish ambassador in London (1919–1934). The plan had been to overwinter there and that Ciechanowiecki should attend school in nearby Pinsk. On 17 September invading Soviet units laid siege to the small town. Elements of local Belarusian activists presented an ultimatum to the Skirmunts: that the 150 Polish military police stationed on their estate should lay down their arms or all the buildings would be set alight. The unworldly Skirmunts fell for the trap; the police were all shot with their own weapons, the elderly Skirmunts were slaughtered in the woods and the premises were looted. Ciechanowiecki and his family managed to flee with the retreating Polish columns of general Franciszek Kleeberg. They travelled via Kamien Koszyrski to Kowel, then by train, on to Lwów. In December they failed to cross the Green frontier into Romania. They left the city in March 1940, just two days ahead of the KGB's arrival to start mass deportations. Recrossing the new frontier, they finally returned to Warsaw in early May 1940.

Back at his old school, he obtained his baccalauréat in 1942 through "clandestine classes", Komplety, together with classmates later to become "luminaries" of Polish higher education such as, Professors: Jerzy Kroh, J.A. Miłobędzki, J. Pelc and K. Szaniawski. The class was later dubbed the "professorial cohort"; of the group, only Ciechanowiecki did not become a professor, he later quipped. After leaving school he had to look for paid employment, did some charity work and enrolled on a degree course at the school of Professor Edward Lipiński, an underground version of the earlier SGH. To "distract" himself from difficult wartime conditions he decided to join an Art History course at the Uniwersytet Ziem Zachodnich (Western University) unaware of how portentous it would become. It enabled him to attend the lectures of professor Tatarkiewicz "on themes like happiness, in the light of a Carbide lamp in a chilly suburban room." In between these many courses, he attended Home Army training classes for cadets.

His wartime and immediate post-war activities remain unclear, at some stage, he became secretary to the politician, Adam Ronikier, an interlocutor with the German high command in occupied Warsaw. Presumably, he remained in that position for the 63-day duration of the Warsaw Uprising that erupted on 1 August 1944. After the collapse of the Warsaw Uprising and the conclusion of hostilities on 5 October, he did not leave the battered capital with the columns of captive Home Army fighters nor with the destitute civilian population. He left ten days later with the Red Cross. By his own account, he visited Pruszków, the vast German holding camp for POWs and "went on Home Army missions in the provinces". He went to Kraków, where he was briefly arrested by the Germans, and then released. Such circumstances were extraordinary for a young intelligent man of his age at that time, who was likely to have been a resistance member and therefore a suspect, unless he had "special protection". His bid to travel with Ronikier was refused and by the end of January 1945, he was back in Warsaw. His claim to have worked for a short spell with the anti-communist Freedom and Independence organisation, (Wolność i Niezawisłość), until the spring of 1945 does not stand up since it was not founded till September of that year.

== Postwar life in Poland ==
Having decided not to escape to the West, in June 1945 he applied to the newly installed government of the People’s Republic of Poland to join the Polish Ministry of Foreign Affairs. Because of his knowledge of several languages, aged just 21, he was employed in the rank of Counsellor. He was assigned as Chief of Protocol to the Ministry of Shipping & Foreign Trade. In that capacity, he participated in numerous negotiations with foreign delegations in Warsaw. In August 1945 he was a member of the Polish Delegation, as its interpreter, to the UNRRA Conference held in London. In the autumn of that year, he was appointed counsellor to the embassy in the Hague, but that appointment was cancelled for political reasons, due to his origins and his alleged Home Army past. He returned to Kraków to complete his studies – firstly at the Academy of Economics, obtaining his degree in 1947 and then in the Faculty of History of Art of the Jagiellonian University, gaining his Master of Arts degree in March 1950. At the same time, he was involved in student activities and was the founder of the Club of the Logophagoi, (Klub Logofagów), a debating society which comprised many prominent students and young scholars – some eminent politicians and scholars were to emerge from its ranks. The club was also the prototype for later clubs of the Catholic intelligentsia, which was preparing for the fall of Communism.

=== Imprisonment ===
Having completed his studies, he was almost immediately appointed lecturer at the Institute of History of Art. Work on his doctoral thesis was interrupted by his arrest on 22 October 1950. Transported immediately to Warsaw in connection with the staged "British Embassy" Show trial and after lengthy interrogations, he was sentenced to ten years in prison in February 1952 for allegedly helping British and Vatican spies, as well as for extending his underground activities beyond the official date for disclosure, which, in any case, would probably have led to an earlier arrest. He spent five years and four months in prison in difficult conditions – firstly on remand in the cellars of the Ministry of Public Security in Koszykowa Street, and later in the infamous Mokotów Prison, both in Warsaw, and finally – after sentencing – in the prisons of Rawicz and Wronki. In the latter two he actively organised spiritual help for his fellow prisoners. Having got himself work in the prison hospital, he was instrumental in forging documents enabling the early release of a very large number of political prisoners. He himself was released on 6 March 1956 less than midway through his sentence. He was later cleared of all charges, probably in exchange for becoming an informer, especially on foreign trips.

== Academic pursuits ==
Returning to Kraków, he took up his doctoral thesis and also worked on other research projects. He was a consultant at the Wawel Castle Museum and also a curator at the Castle Museum in Łańcut. His academic interests concentrated on the history of furniture and later on Kraków Baroque silver, as well as on the culture of the former Commonwealth of Poland. In 1958 he won a travel scholarship from the Ford Foundation and the British Council, leaving the country on 22 July of that year, presumably, not thinking that it would mean a 19-year break with his homeland. He did, however, take the precaution of bringing with him all his materials relating to his research, the subject of his doctoral thesis. Later he completed another thesis at University of Tübingen, Germany.

== Activities in Western Europe ==
After a 3-month stay in Great Britain, he spent another six months in the United States, visiting museums and lecturing on Polish culture. He had offers of work and further scholarships, but he decided to return to Europe, where in the autumn of 1959 he enrolled at the University of Tübingen to prepare a further doctoral thesis, on a new topic, and for which he had fortunately taken most of the materials with him from Kraków. At the same time, he taught Polish Culture for two semesters and was a lecturer in Polish. A doctorate in philosophy (magna cum laude) was conferred on him at the University of Tübingen in July 1960. His dissertation Michał Kazimierz Ogiński und sein Musenhof zu Słonim was published in German in 1961. As a recognised work of reference, it was also translated into Belarusian in two editions (1993 and 2006). He later spent a few months in Portugal on a Gulbenkian Foundation scholarship, the results of which were articles on Portuguese furniture.

=== Art dealership ===
In 1961, he settled permanently in London, where he had been offered a directorship in the newly founded firm Mallett at Bourdon House, a subsidiary of Mallet & Son in Bond Street. That same year, with the help of Polish friends already permanently resident in the United Kingdom, he arranged for his mother, Matylda, to whom he was devoted to come and join him in Britain. He became a British subject in 1967.

During his time at Mallett's, he organised four innovative exhibitions on sculpture, mainly of the forgotten French 19th century, which were received with much critical acclaim. In 1965 he was invited to be co-organiser and co-owner of the newly opened London branch in Jermyn Street of the French Heim Gallery. Gradually he bought out his partners and finally became the gallery's sole owner. In 1991 he sold the Heim Gallery and opened a smaller specialist business named, The Old Masters Gallery, located opposite his previous gallery in Jermyn Street. He dealt from there until 1995, when as a result of a serious stroke he had to close the gallery and retire from business.

=== Art curator and collector ===
Finally, having established a good income stream, he began collecting works of Polish art and art connected with Poland, in the hope that they would ultimately reach his homeland. He was also the co-organiser of three major exhibitions including: Treasures of a Polish King at the Dulwich Gallery in London in 1992. Next was the exhibition on Polish Expressionism and The Land of the Winged Horsemen in museums in the USA. Travelling to the United States several times a year, he lectured extensively on the history of Polish Culture, particularly in Detroit, where he contributed to the creation of a Polish Section at the Detroit Institute of Arts. He also lectured in Britain and had articles published in various scholarly magazines.

=== Recognition of the Jewish contribution ===
As co-founder of the Page of History Foundation, (Fundacja Karta z Dziejów), which commemorates the centuries of Jewish participation in the culture and life of Poland, he contributed financially and as its artistic advisor to the erection of the monument "The Ten Commandments" in Łódź and the statue of "David the Psalmist" in Zamość, both the work of Gustaw Zemła. Other works, sponsored by the foundation, are in the pipeline. He also deposited works of art from his own collections to decorate several Polish Embassies.

== Knight of Malta ==
Ciechanowiecki had petitioned from Poland, as the first Pole from behind the Iron Curtain, and was probably among the first petitioners from Eastern Europe, to seek membership of the Sovereign & Military Order of Malta, SMOM, in 1957, although usually it is by invitation only. He was accepted into its ranks a year later by the Polish Association of the Order, then in exile. He later became its deputy chancellor, to Emeryk August Hutten-Czapski for 10 years, and vice president until 1997. He initiated under its aegis the creation of a care home, Kolbe House, for Polish elderly in the outskirts of London, which later transferred to Warsaw, where it became far more significant. He rose through the ranks of the Order, finally becoming Bailiff Grand Cross of the Most Venerable Order of the Hospital of Saint John of Jerusalem.

He was also very active in various dynastic orders, especially those of the Bourbon-Two Sicilies dynasty, creating delegations to Poland, Great Britain and Ireland of the Sacred Military Constantinian Order of Saint George, serving under Grand Master, The Duke of Castro on the Order's Council in Rome. He rose through the ranks and held uniquely the honours of Knight of the Order of St Januarius, Bailiff Grand Cross of Justice of the Sacred Military Constantinian Order of Saint George with Collar and Grand Cross of the Royal Order of Francis I.

He later formed the Delegation of the Order of St Maurice & St Lazarus of the Royal House of Savoy in the UK and in recent years helped to establish the Tuscan Dynastic Orders of St Stephen and that of St Joseph in Britain. He was also very close to the former Russian Imperial House and was decorated with the highest Orders of Imperial Russia.

His position in the Order of Malta and his personal relationships with the heads of former ruling houses as well as his quasi-diplomatic activities in the fields of culture and ecclesiastical affairs were the grounds on which the last King of Italy, Umberto II, who although in exile, had kept his royal prerogatives in the field of Heraldry and confirmed Ciechanowiecki's "hereditary right" to use a comital title in 1975 – a foreign title allegedly "bestowed" on a family member more than 200 years ago, though the origin of the confirm title is disputed. Two years later the Order of Malta confirmed this usage in all pertinent acts of the order internationally, as it maintains diplomatic relations with more than 100 sovereign states.

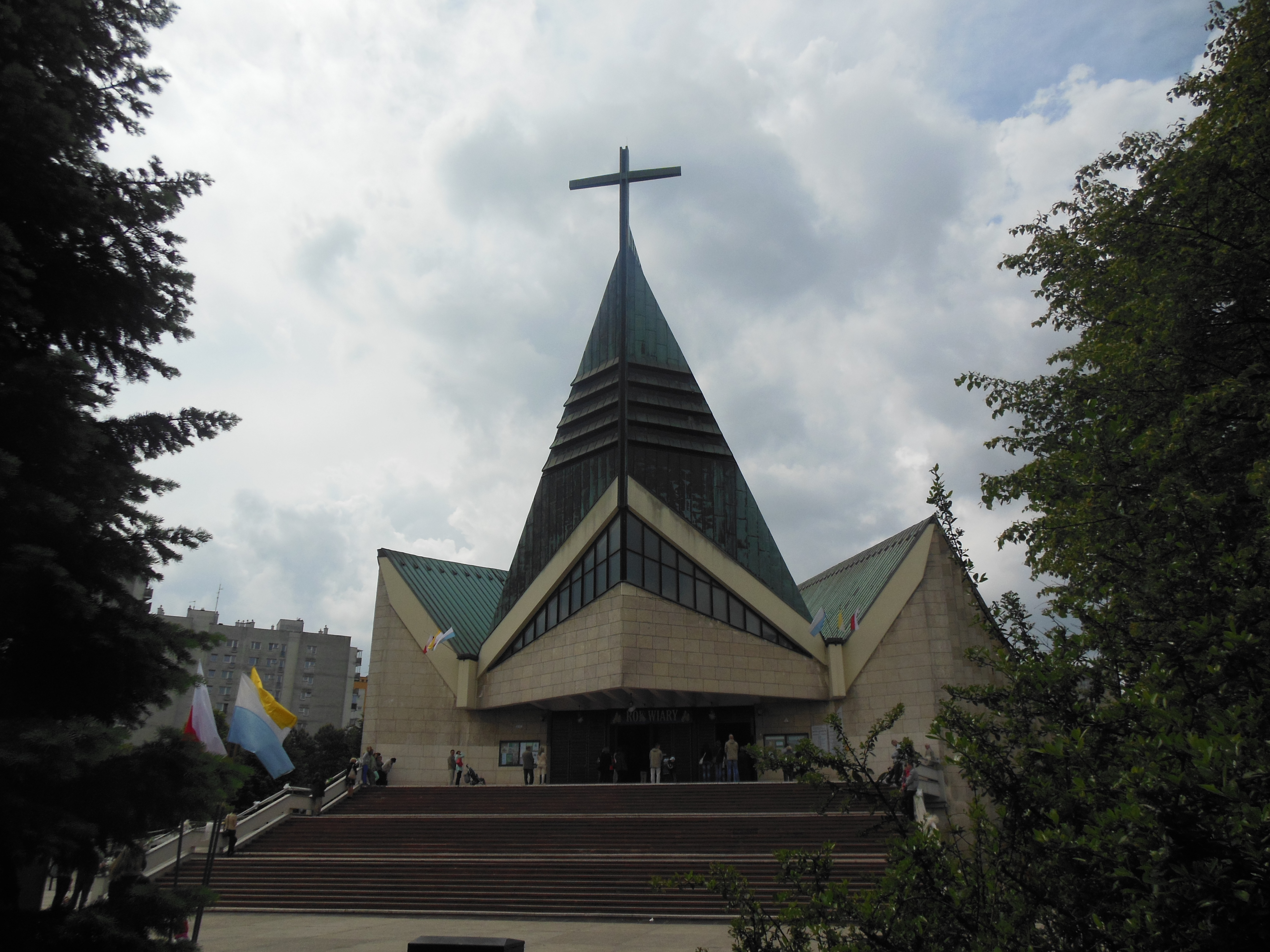
Church of St. Maksymilian Kolbe, Kraków

On behalf of the Polish Association of SMOM in the UK, he did much to support Polish charities during Martial law in Poland (1991–92), funded many scholarships and, on behalf of the Polish Association of the Knights of Malta contributed to the costs for the construction of the Church of St Maximilian Kolbe in the industrial suburb of Mistrzejowice on the outskirts of Kraków. It was the second church to be built in a secular Communist city (1975–1983). Its interior décor is mainly sculptural. He worked closely with Prof. Gustaw Ziemła, a noted Polish sculptor, to produce the décor of the Lady chapel, which has entered the canon of Polish post-war sculpture.

== Later life ==
In 1995 Ciechanowiecki suffered a severe stroke, which deprived him of the use of his legs. He used a wheelchair for the last twenty years of his life. However, he remained intellectually very active in the pursuit of his many interests. Above all, he continued with his numerous connections with Poland, where he still travelled several times a year to attend academic meetings, including those of his own Foundation, as well as to deal with the publication of various books, and also to pursue his para-diplomatic and political activities.

Ciechanowiecki never married and died without issue, in London on 2 November 2015, aged 91. After a funeral service at the Brompton Oratory, London, his remains were taken to their final resting place in the crypt of the Knights of Malta in the parish church of Mistrzejowice, Kraków.

== Awards and decorations ==
Country	Date	Appointment	Ribbon	Post-nominal letters	Other
Poland	1944	Cross of Merit with Swords (Note: Unknown class.)			
Sovereign Military Order of Malta	1958	Knight of Grace and Devotion			Dynastic order
Poland-in-exile	5 April 1973	Officer's Cross of the Order of Polonia Restituta			Conferred by Stanisław Ostrowski.
Poland-in-exile	22 October 1976	Commander's Cross of the Order of Polonia Restituta			Conferred by Stanisław Ostrowski
Sovereign Military Order of Malta	1977	Knight of Honour and Devotion			Promoted to Grand Knight in 1987
Poland-in-exile	1984	Krzyż Kampanii Wrześniowej			
Poland-in-exile	1986	Commander's Cross with Star of the Order of Polonia Restituta			Conferred on 1 January 1986 by Edward Raczyński for services to Polish national culture and his contribution to cataloguing Polish historical objects and monuments.
Poland-in-exile	1986	Merentibus Medal			Awarded by Jagiellonian University in Krakow, Poland.
Sovereign Military Order of Malta	1987	Knight Grand Cross of Honour and Devotion			Later promoted to Grand Bailiff
Poland	25 February 1993	Grand Cross of the Order of Polonia Restituta			Conferred by President Lech Wałęsa, recognised for his outstanding contribution to Polish culture.
Poland	1995	Cross of the Polish Home Army			
Poland	1995	Cross of the Warsaw Uprising			
Poland	15 August 1998	Order of the White Eagle			Conferred by President Aleksander Kwaśniewski in recognition of his distinguished services to the Republic of Poland.
Poland	2006	Gold Gloria Artis Medal			
France	6 November 2012	Commander of the Order of Arts and Letters			Presented by Pierre Buhler, French ambassador to Poland.
Austria		Grand Decoration of Honour in Silver for Services to the Republic of Austria (Note: Also described as the Commander's Cross, First Class.)			
Belarus		Order of Friendship of Peoples			
Belarus		Order of Francysk Skaryna			
France		Officer of the Legion of Honour			
Germany		Officer's Cross of the Order of Merit of the Federal Republic of Germany			
Holy See		Grand Cross of the Order of St Gregory the Great		GCSG	
Italy		Grand Officer of the Order of Merit of the Italian Republic		OMRI	
Poland		Army Medal for War			Awarded three times.
Poland		Medal „Za udział w wojnie obronnej 1939”			
Poland		Bene Merito honorary badge			
Poland		Veteran's Cross			Awarded by the Polish Ex-Combatants Association of London.
Poland		Gold Badge of the Polish Ministry of Finance			Awarded in London, UK.
Poland		Polonia Mater Nostra Est			
Poland		Gold Cross of Merit of the Polish Catholic Church			
Senegal		Commander of the Order of Merit of Senegal			
Sovereign Military Order of Malta		Bailiff Grand Cross of Honour and Devotion			
Sovereign Military Order of Malta		Grand Cross of the Order pro Merito Melitensi			A separate order of merit of the Sovereign Military Order of Malta.
Sweden		Commander of the Order of the Polar Star			
United Kingdom		Bailiff Grand Cross of the Order of Saint John		GCStJ	
House of Romanov	1995	Grand Cross of the Order of St Andrew			Dynastic order
House of Romanov		Grand Cross of the Order of St Alexander Nevsky			Dynastic order
House of Romanov		Grand Cross, First Class, of the Order of St Anna			Dynastic order
House of Savoy		Grand Cross of the Order of Saints Maurice and Lazarus			Dynastic order
House of Savoy		Grand Cross of the Order of Civil Merit of Savoy			Dynastic order
House of Savoy		Gold Medal of Merit of the House of Savoy			Dynastic decoration
House of Tuscany		Knight of Justice of the Order of Saint Stephen			Dynastic order
House of Tuscany		Grand Cross of the Order of Saint Joseph			Dynastic order
House of Bourbon		Knight of the Order of St Januarius			Dynastic order
House of Bourbon		Bailiff Grand Cross of Justice of the Sacred Military Constantinian Order of Saint George with Collar			Dynastic order
House of Bourbon		Grand Cross of the Royal Order of Francis I			Dynastic order
House of Bourbon		Gold Medal of Merit of the Sacred Military Constantinian Order of Saint George			Dynastic decoration

== Arms ==
Coat of arms of Count Andrew Ciechanowiecki
Notes The arms of the Count Ciechanowiecki of Dabrowa consist of: Crest An eagle wing sable pierced by an arrow in fess to sinister, issuant from a ducal coronet or. Helm Closed helm affronty argent. Escutcheon Azure a horseshoe argent with a cross pattée or on the toe and two crosses fitched of the same in bend on the branches.

== See also ==
- List of Poles
- Poles in the United Kingdom
- Szlachta

== Bibliography ==
- Białonowska, Magdalena. Andrzej Stanisław Ciechanowiecki: Kolekcjoner, marszand i mecenas. Lublin: Towarzystwo Naukowe KUL 2012. ISBN 978-8373065970
- Barnes, Joanna. "Andrew Ciechanowiecki: 1924–2015" 3rd dimension 9 December 2015. . [retrieved 2018.12.02]. An extended obituary of the art historian.
- Montagu, Jennifer. "Andrew Stanislaus [Andrzej Stanisław] Ciechanowiecki, 1924–2015" Burlington Magazine obituary. [retrieved 2018.12.02].
- Szejnert, Małgorzata. Usypać góry. Historie z Polesia published by Otwarte, 2015. ISBN 978-8324034758
- Piwocka, M. Andrzej Ciechanowiecki i dziedzictwo Słonimia, "Studia Waweliana", Vol XIV, 2009, pp. 265–272 (PL ISSN 1230-3275).
- Zamoyski, Adam. The Apollo Portrait : Andrew Ciechanowiecki, in Apollo, July 1987.
- Knox, Tim Art in Trust for Poland, in Apollo, June 2005.
- Demoriane, H. Vous aussi, devenez collectionneurs de bronzes, in Connaissance des Arts, Paris 1965.
- Coignard, Jérôme, Esquisses d’une vie : vente de la collection d’esquisses peintes françaises du XVIIe au XIXe siècle d’André Ciechanowiecki, Drouot-Richelieu, Paris, le 28 Juin 2002, in Connaissance des Arts, Paris, June 2002.
- Heim Gallery and Old Masters Gallery, 1965–1994, records
- Communiqué on the granting of the Order of the White Eagle
- Ciechanowiecki, A. S. "Speeches given on the occasion of the conferral of honorary membership of the Association of Art Historians"
