= Iwanowo light railway =

Coordinates: 52.1456°N 25.5327°E

Iwacewice–Iwanowo–Kamien-Koczirsk
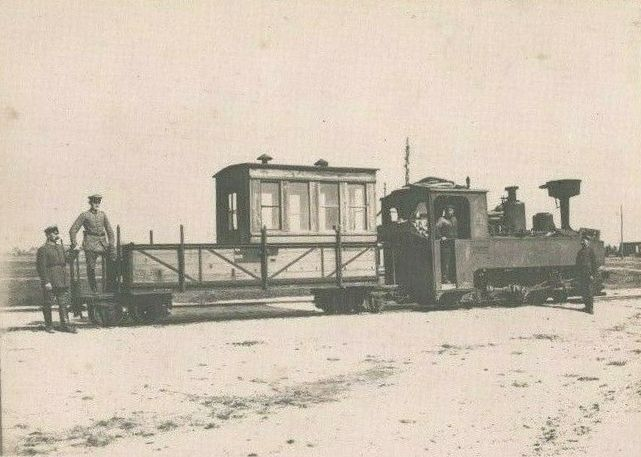
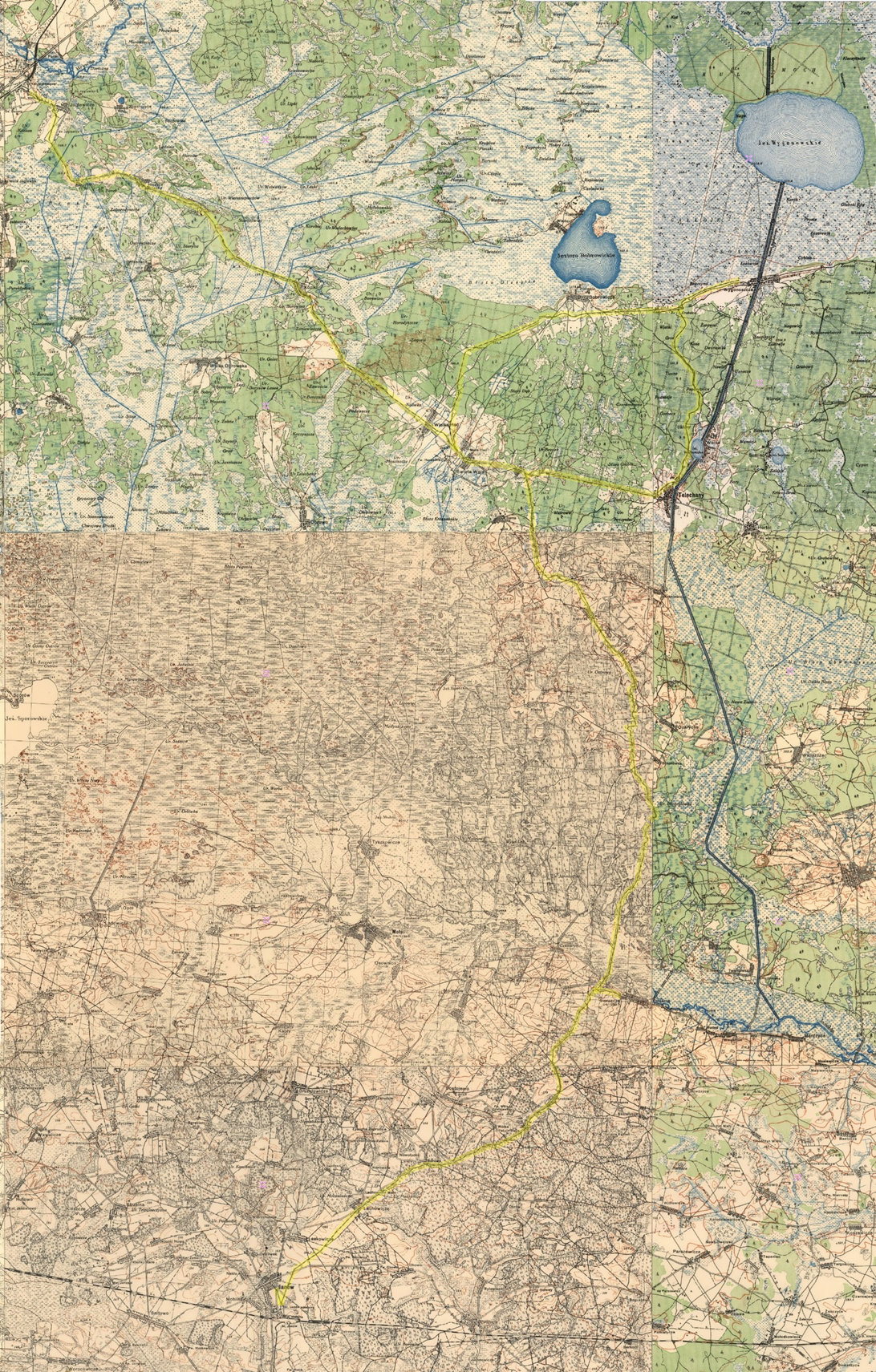
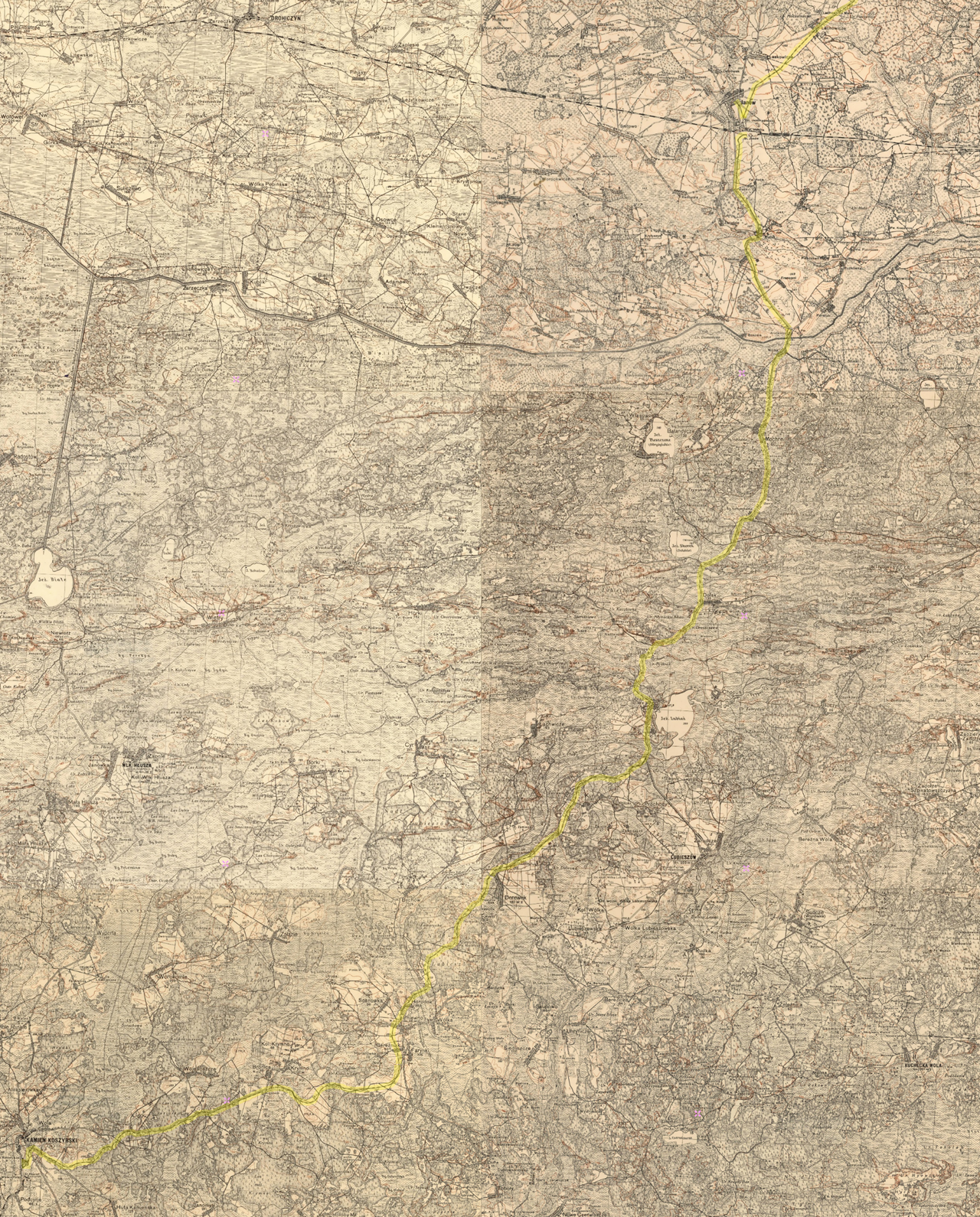
- Inspection waggon, 31 August 1918 Northern branch highlighted in yellow, ca 1924 Southern branch highlighted in yellow, ca 1924

Technical
- Line length: ca 170 km (110 mi)
- Track gauge: 600 mm (1 ft 11 5/8 in)

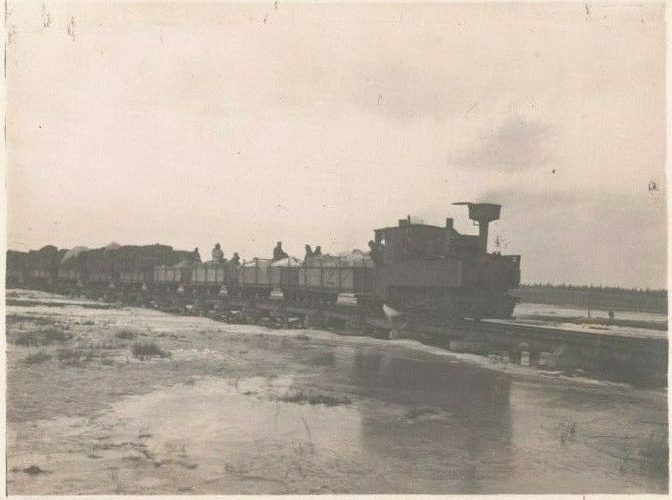
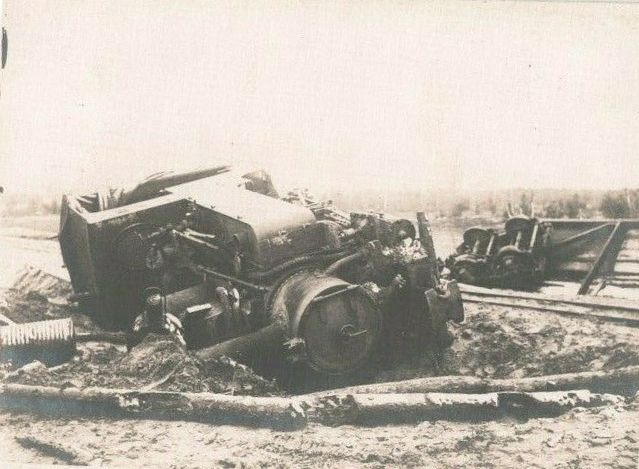
The light railway near Kamien in World War I, March 1918

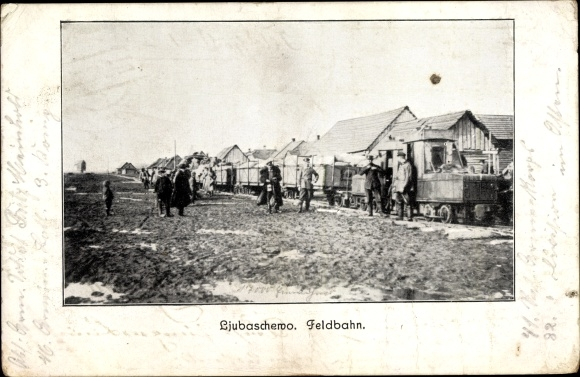
Ljubaschevo, postal stamp 21. August 1916

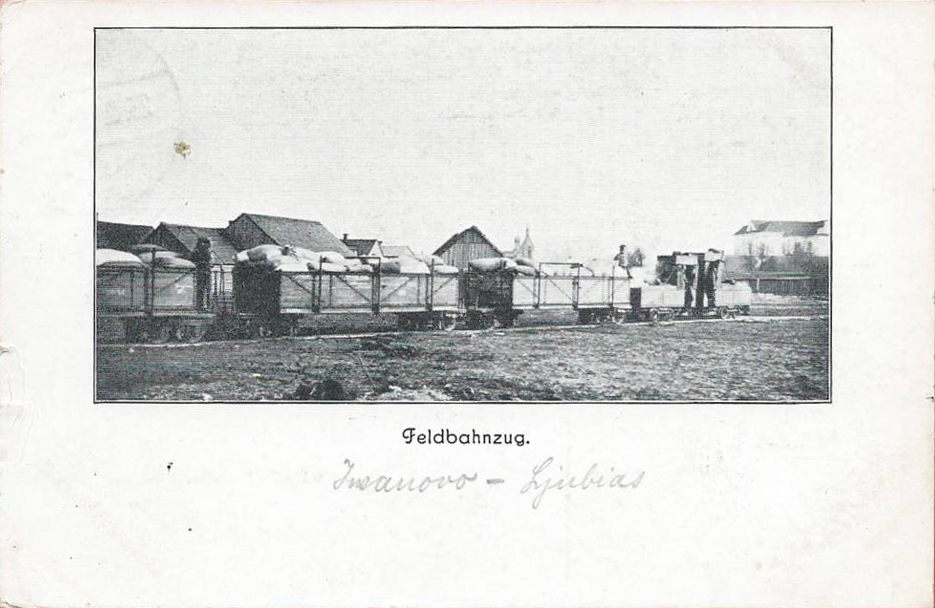
Train Iwanowo–Ljubiat

The Iwanowo light railway was an approximately 170 km (110 mi) long military light railway with a track gauge of 600 mm (1 ft 11 5/8 in) from Ivatsevichy via Iwanowo to Kamin-Kashyrskyi with two branch lines to the area west of Pinsk.

== History ==
The light railway with a gauge of 600 mm (1 ft 11 5/8 in) was laid during World War I and used for mixed passenger and freight transport until Second World War.

== Route ==
The line with a cumulative length of 170 km (110 mi) crossed Polish marsh Polesia in a north-south direction along the early historic Vilnius-Lviv trade route and near the Lviv-Drohiczyn-Slonim (Wolkowysk)-Vilnius mainline. The mainline had been planned to run on a chain of dry sandy islands, when the light railway was being built.

During the World War I, at least the Iwanovo-Lyubeshiv had been completed by August 1916.

In 1939 there were the following stations and connections:

- Ivatsevichy near Kosiv (on the Brest-Baranavichy mainline)
- Święta Wola^{(pl)} (with a branch to Telekhany)
- Ivanava (Janów Poleski) (on the Brest-Pinsk mainline)
- Kamin-Kashyrskyi (on the mainline to Kovel)

== Locomotives ==
At least one of the steam locomotives was built by Borsig in 1919 and delivered to Poland by the Railway Replacement Park Sperenberg, where it was given the Reichsbahn number 99 1563 after the German invasion.

== See also ==
- Ivanychi-Rachyn light railway
