= Ivanava district =

District of Brest region, Belarus

Ivanava district Іванаўскі раён (Belarusian)
- District
- Flag Coat of arms

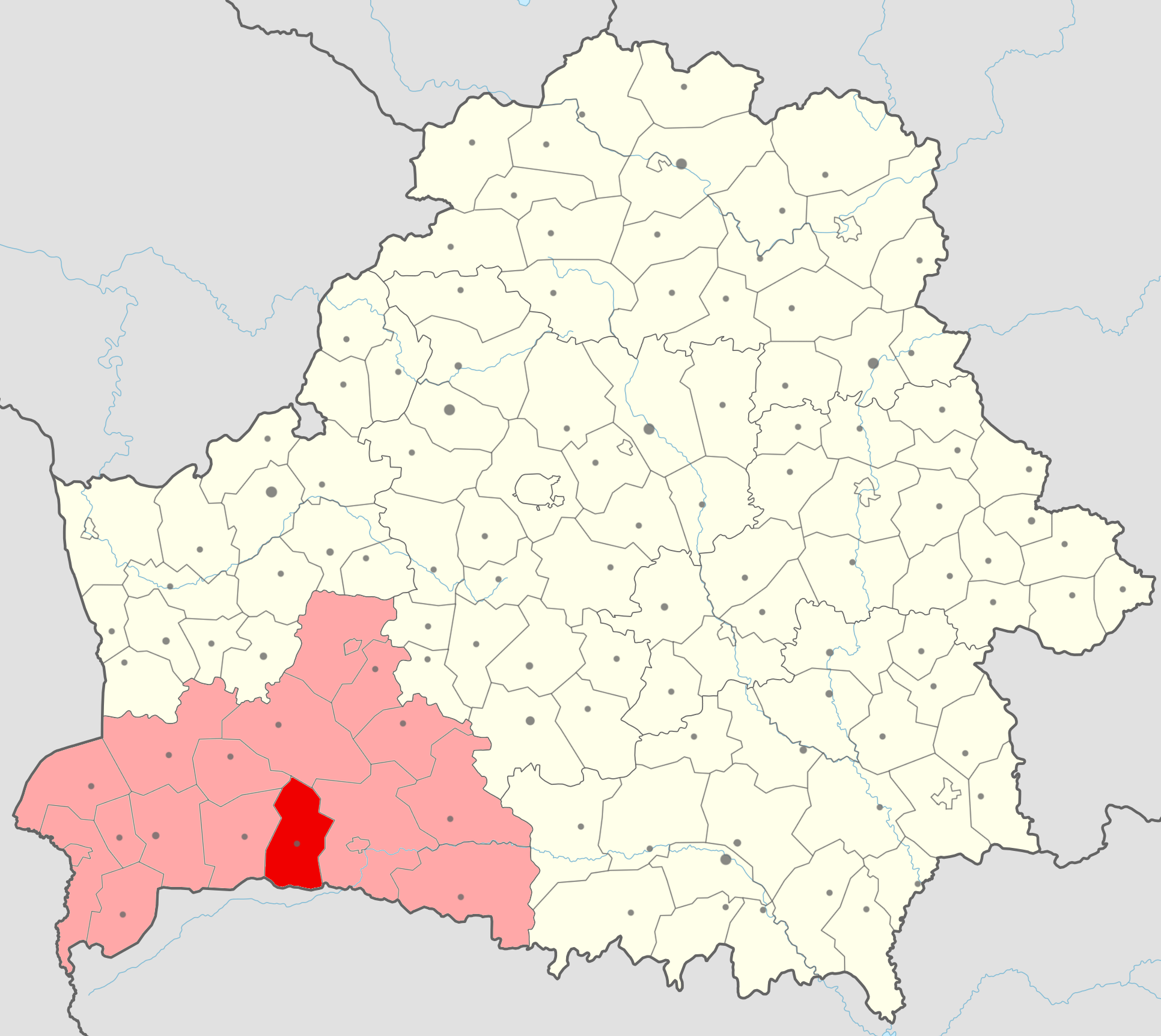
- Coordinates: 52°08′58″N 25°32′06″E
- Country: Belarus
- Region: Brest region
- Formed: 1940
- Administrative center: Ivanava

Area
  - District: 1,551.41 km^{2} (599.00 sq mi)

Population (2024)
  - District: 35,097
  - Density: 22.623/km^{2} (58.592/sq mi)
  - Urban: 16,172
  - Rural: 18,925
- Time zone: UTC+3 (MSK)
- Website: ivanovo.brest-region.gov.by

Ivanava district (Belarusian: Іванаўскі раён; Russian: Ивановский район) is a district (raion) of Brest region in Belarus. Its administrative center is Ivanava. As of 2024, it has a population of 35,097.

== Demographics ==
At the time of the 2009 Belarusian census, Ivanava district had a population of 43,586. Of these, 95.5% declared Belarusian, 2.2% Ukrainian and 1.8% Russian. 80.9% spoke Belarusian and 17.0% Russian as their native language. In 2023, it had a population of 36,701.

== Settlements ==
- Moładava

== Notable residents ==
- Napoleon Orda (1807-1883), artist known for numerous sketches of historical sites of the former Polish–Lithuanian Commonwealth
