= Ivanychi light railway =

Narrow-gauge railway in Ukraine

Ivanychi–Pavlivka–Rachyn–Horokhiv–Stoianiv–Tartakiv–Sokal light railway
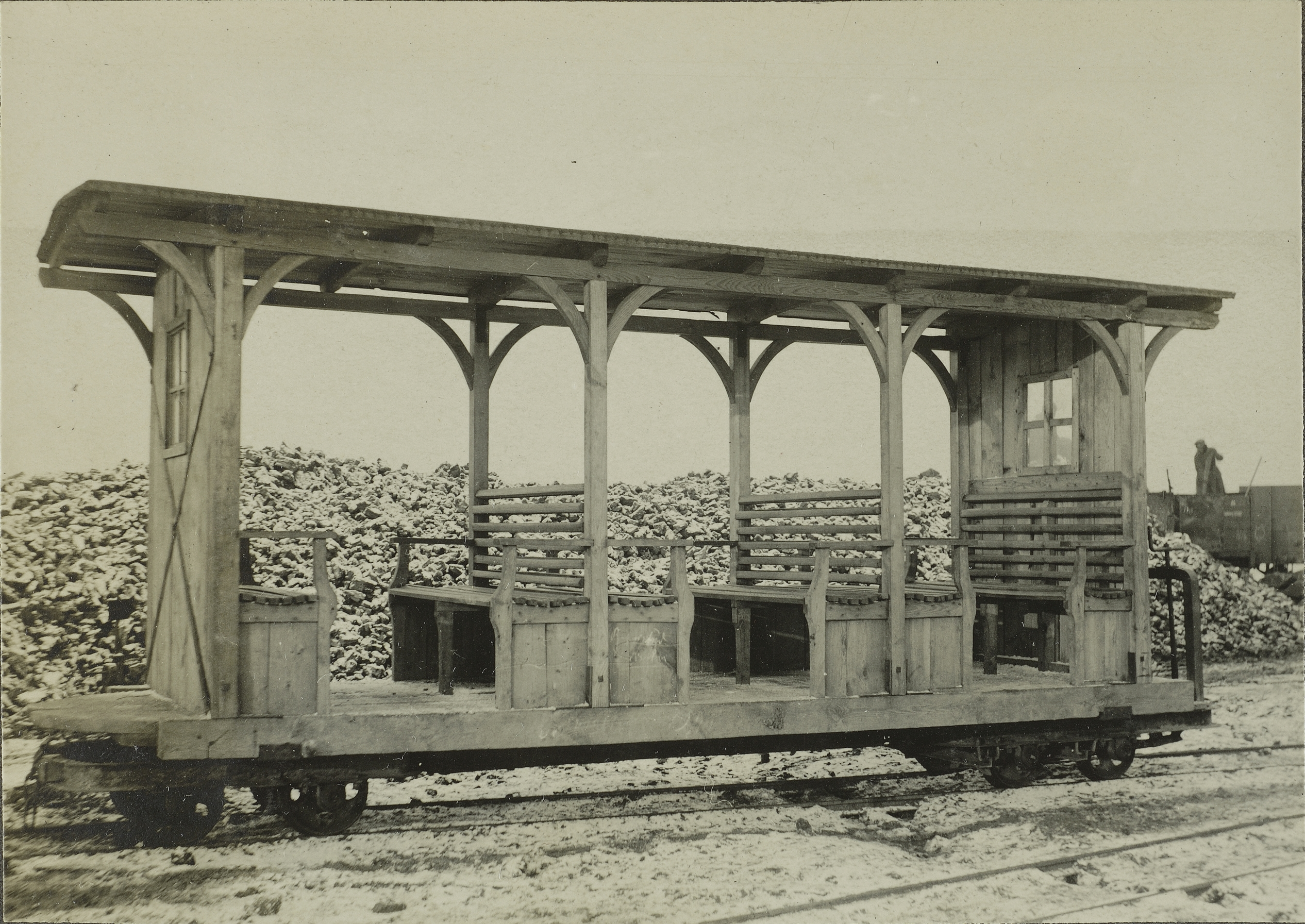
- Passenger carriage on the Ivanychi–Rachyn light railway, 1916

Technical
- Line length: Approx 95 km (59 mi)
- Track gauge: 600 mm (1 ft 11 5/8 in)

The Ivanychi light railway (historical name: Feldbahn Iwaniczy–Raczyn) was an approximately 95 km (59 mi) long light railway with a track gauge of 600 mm (1 ft 11 5/8 in) from Ivanychi via Pavlivka, Rachyn, Horokhiv, Stoianiv and Tartakiv to Sokal in Volhynia (now in the Volyn Oblast and Lviv Oblast in Ukraine), which operated in parts at least from 1915 to 1928.

== Operation ==
The light railway, which was used for military purposes during World War I, was operated to transport military materiel (weapons, ammunition, building materials, fodder and food) as well as troops and wounded men. Both wooden and metal carriages were hauled by horses and steam locomotives on the almost level track.

The light railway was operated by soldiers of the Austro-Hungarian Army and the German Army. During Alexander von Linsingen's reorganisation of the army groups in December 1916, the Austro-Hungarian corps were merged with the 'Raczyn Section' (German 108th Infantry Division, 224th Infantry Division, 2nd Guards Cavalry Brigade) to form the 'Luga Section' under General of the Cavalry Georg von der Marwitz.

== Rolling stock ==
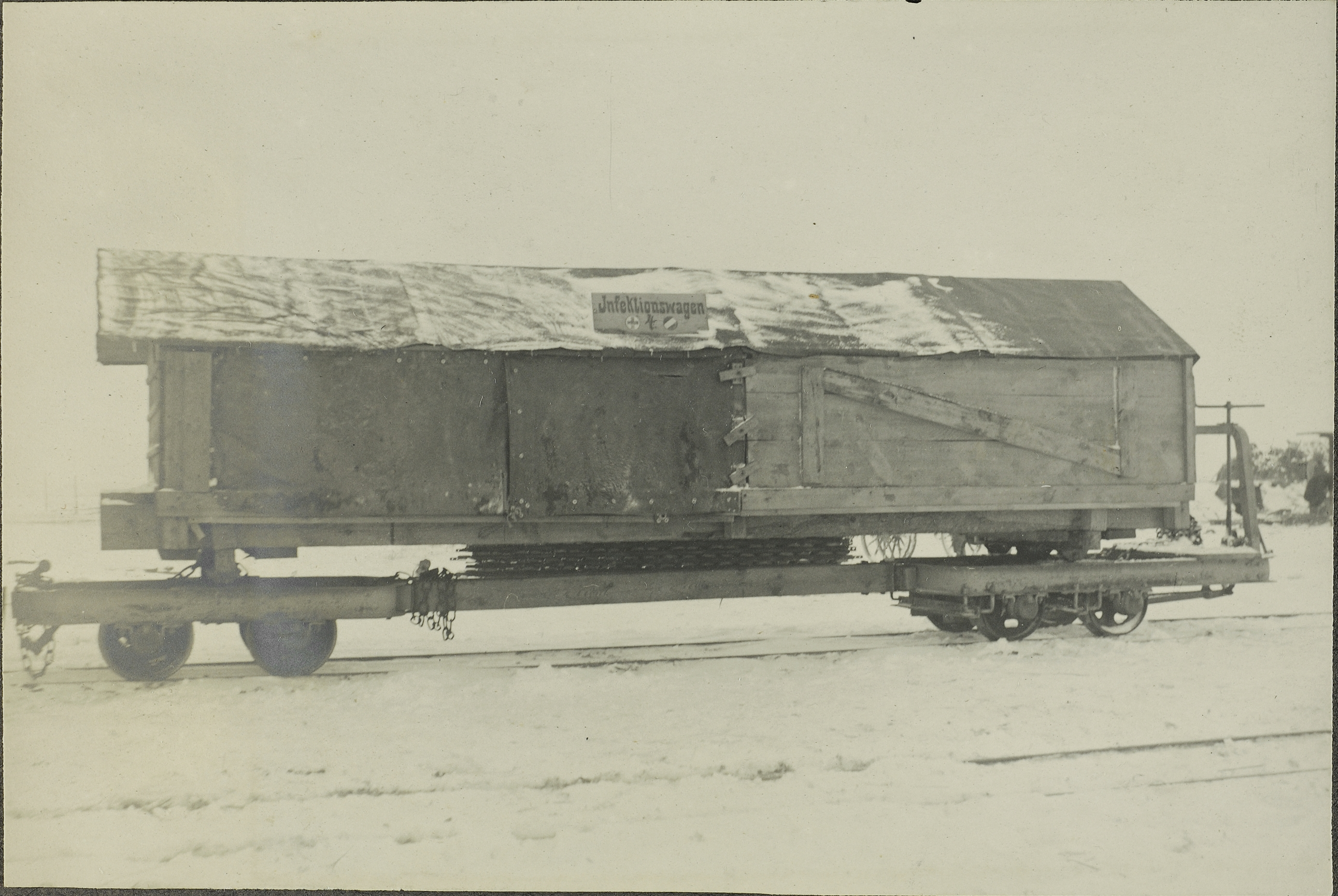
Infection Waggon, 1916

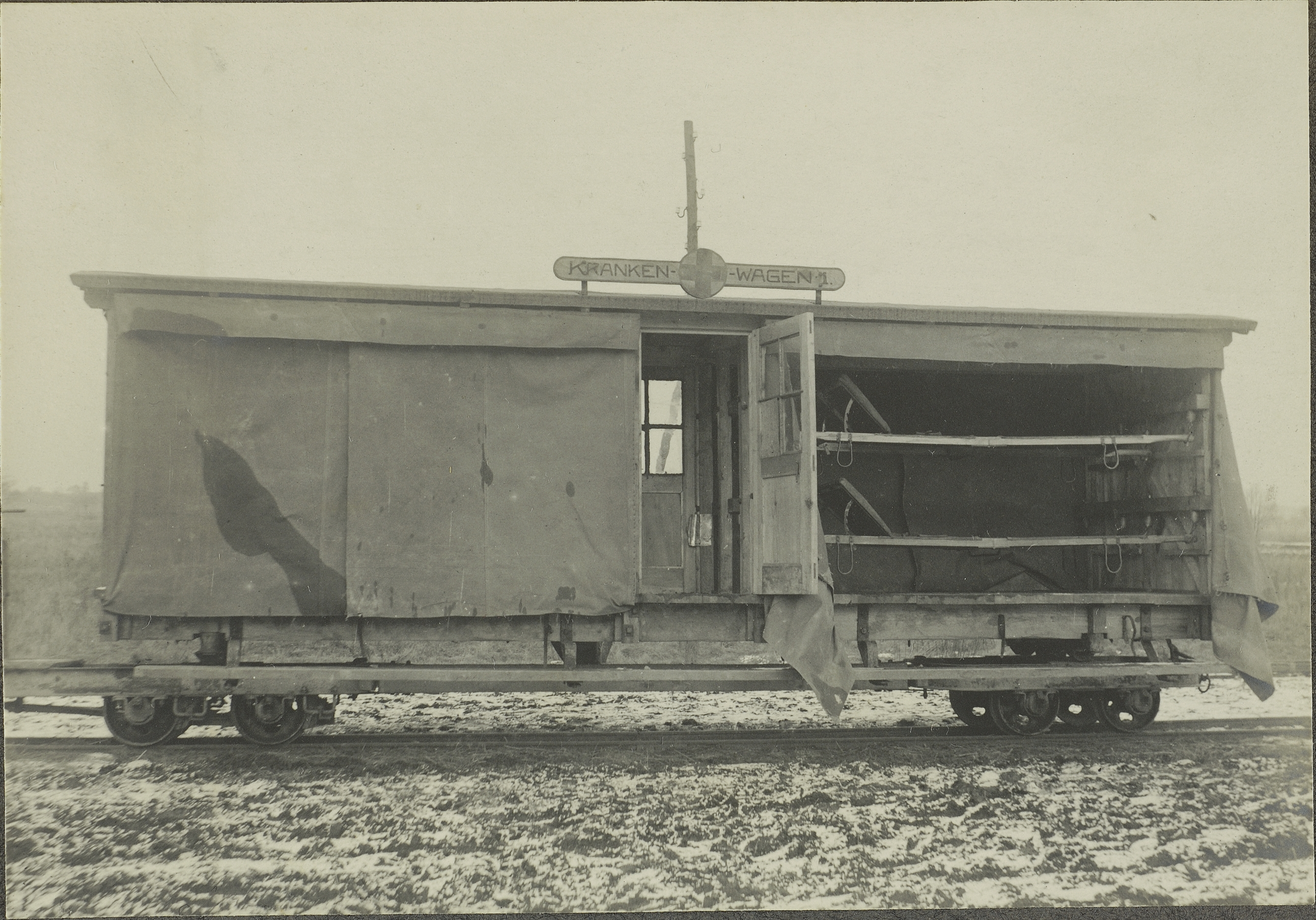
Ambulance waggon, 1916

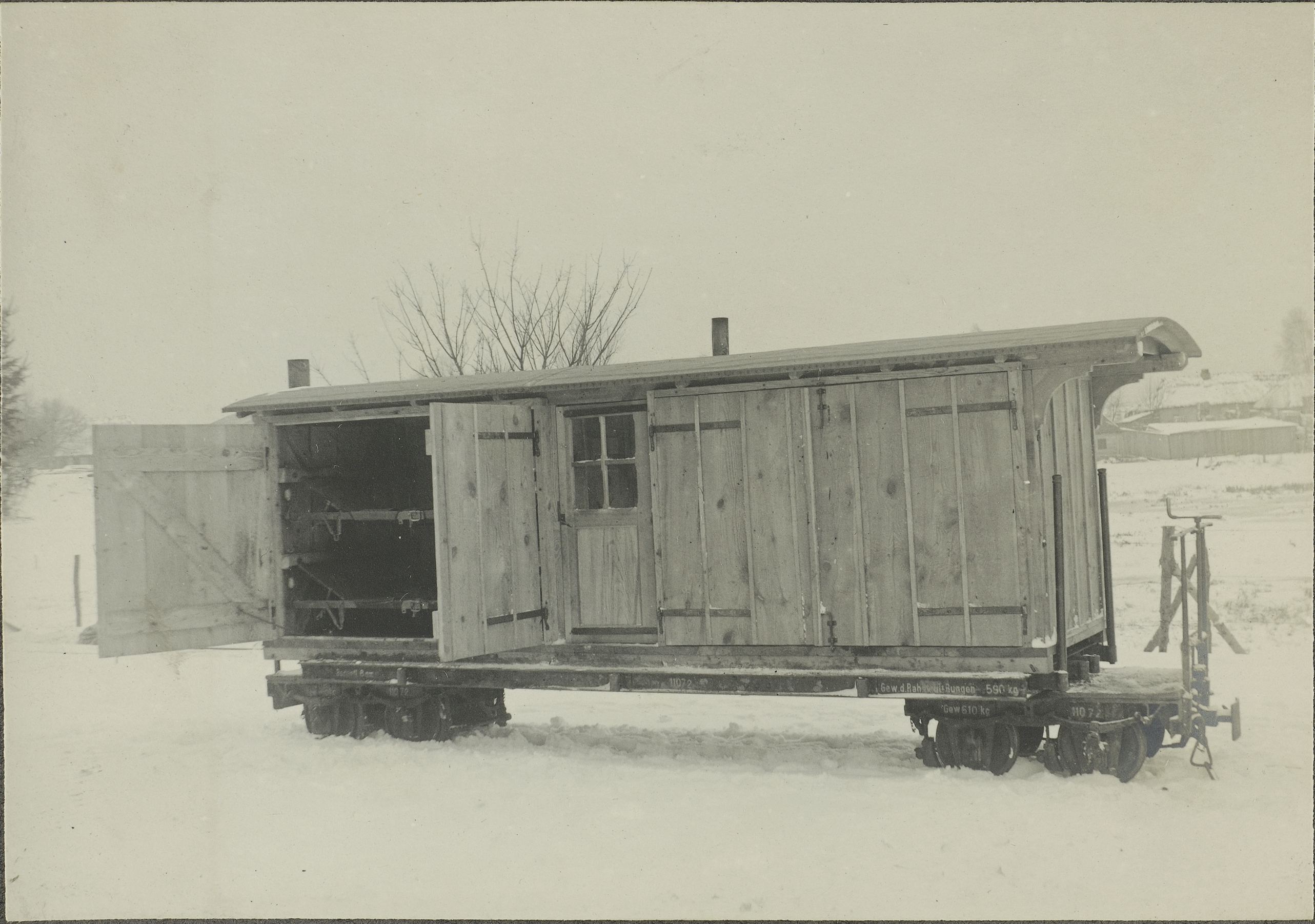
Flat wagon with insertable stanchions

The following steam locomotives were used on the light railway:

- Borsig, No. 6152/1907, E. Bernhard, Berlin for Camburg
- Henschel, No. 9698/1909, Gerätevereinigung, Cologne
- O&K, No. 5223/1912, Jacob Gorges, Rastenberg
- Henschel, No. 12464/1913, R. Dolberg, Hamburg
- Maffei, No. 3927/1917, central transport management, Vienna

Four historic photos of the locally converted wagons with German labels are preserved in the ETH Library of the ETH Zurich.

== See also ==
- Iwanowo light railway
