= Ivanava =

Town in Brest Region, Belarus

Ivanava Іванава (Belarusian) Иваново (Russian)
- Town
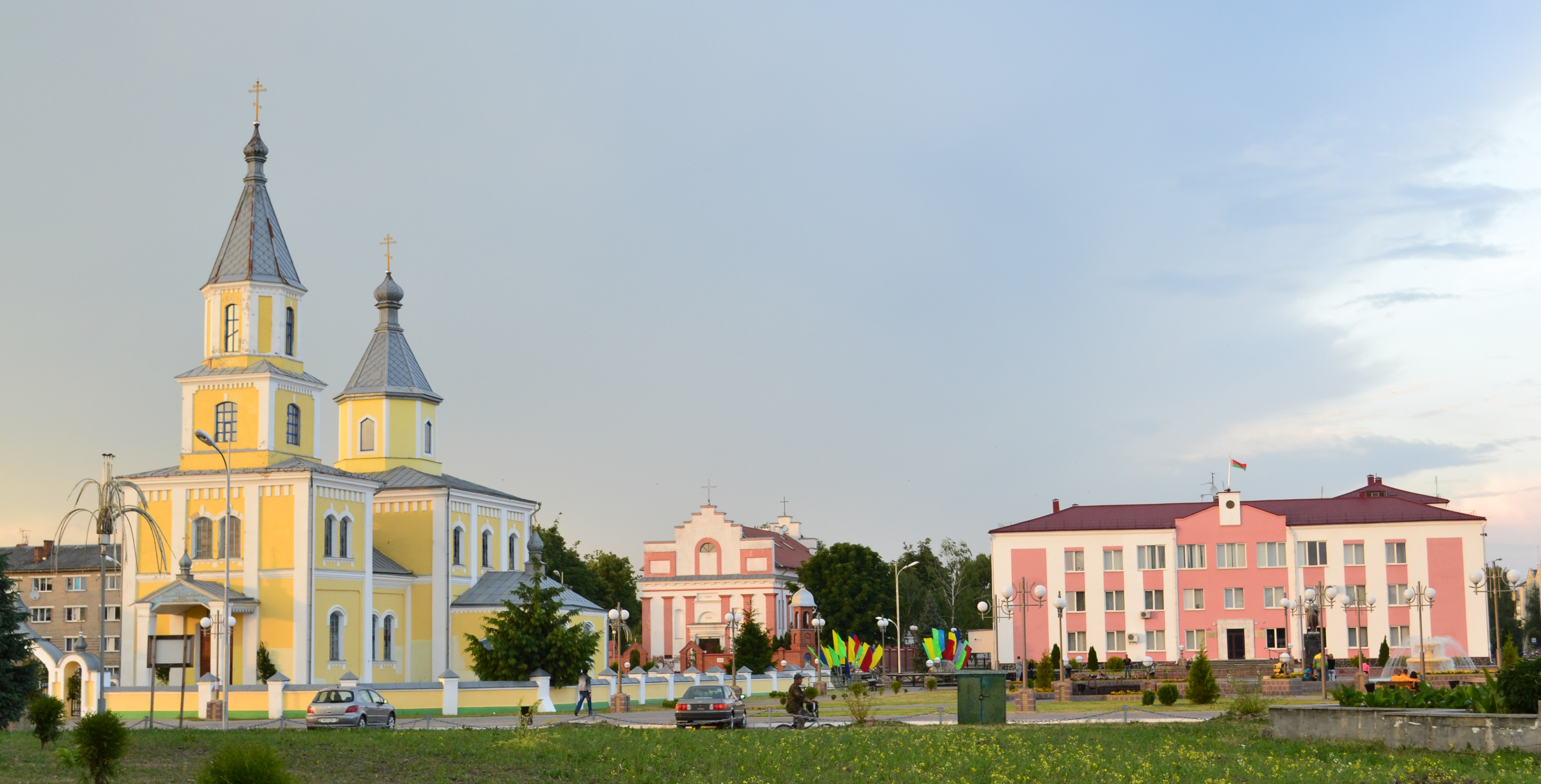
- Panorama of the town center

- Flag Coat of arms

- Location within Belarus
- Coordinates: 52°08′N 25°33′E
- Country: Belarus
- Region: Brest Region
- District: Ivanava District
- First mentioned: 14th century

Population (2026)
  - Total: 15,833
- Time zone: UTC+3 (MSK)
- Postal code: 225791-225792
- Area code: +375 1652
- License plate: 1

Ivanava, or Ivanovo, (Note: Belarusian: Іванава; Russian: Иваново, romanized: Ivanovo; Polish: Janów; Yiddish: יאַנעווע, romanized: Yàneve; local pronunciation: [jɐˈnɪu̯].) also historically known as Yanaw or Yanov (until 1940), (Note: Belarusian: Янаў; Russian: Янов; Polish: Janów.) is a town in Brest Region, in southern Belarus. It serves as the administrative center of Ivanava District. As of 2026, it has a population of 15,833.

== History ==
Andrzej Bobola memorial church. (A 19th century painting)

First mentioned in the 14th century, it was initially a village named Porkhovo. In 1423, it was granted by the king Władysław Jagiełło to the cathedral in Lutsk. Renamed Janów, in 1465 it was granted town rights. A small town in Polesia, it shared the fate of the region. On May 16, 1657, it was the seat of the martyrdom of Saint Andrzej Bobola. The town was annexed by Russia during the Third Partition of Poland in 1795; it did not develop much, mostly because of its proximity to the much more populous town of Pinsk. At the end of the 19th century, it had around 3,000 inhabitants, mostly peasants and workers in a local minor textile works.

From 1915 to 1918, it was occupied by Germany before it was transferred to Poland in 1919. During the Polish–Soviet War, it was briefly occupied by Bolshevik forces from July to October 1920. After being retaken by Poland, the town was the centre of mobilization of General Jarosławcew's 3rd Volga Infantry Division, part of General Stanisław Bułak-Bałachowicz's forces. During the interwar period, the town remained a minor and rather non-notable centre of commerce in the area. In 1926, a new railroad was built. However, development remained slow as other areas of Poland were favoured by the industries.

Following the start of World War II in 1939, the town was occupied by the Soviet Union and then annexed to the Byelorussian Soviet Socialist Republic. On June 27, 1941, the town was occupied by Nazi Germany. During the German occupation, most of the Jewish inhabitants of the area were murdered in the Holocaust. In January 1943, participants in the 1943 Pinsk Prison raid and the freed Polish partisans escaped from the Germans through the town. On January 22, 1943, 30 locals were murdered as a reprisal for the prison raid. In July 1944, the town was liberated by the Soviet 61st Army.

The town was the seat of a district between 1954 and 1962 and again from 1965. In 1991, the town became part of independent Belarus.

== Sources ==
- "Иваново" . Brockhaus and Efron Encyclopedic Dictionary (in Russian). 1906.
