= Moladava =

Agrotown in Brest Region, Belarus

Moladava Моладава (Belarusian) Молодово (Russian)
- Agrotown
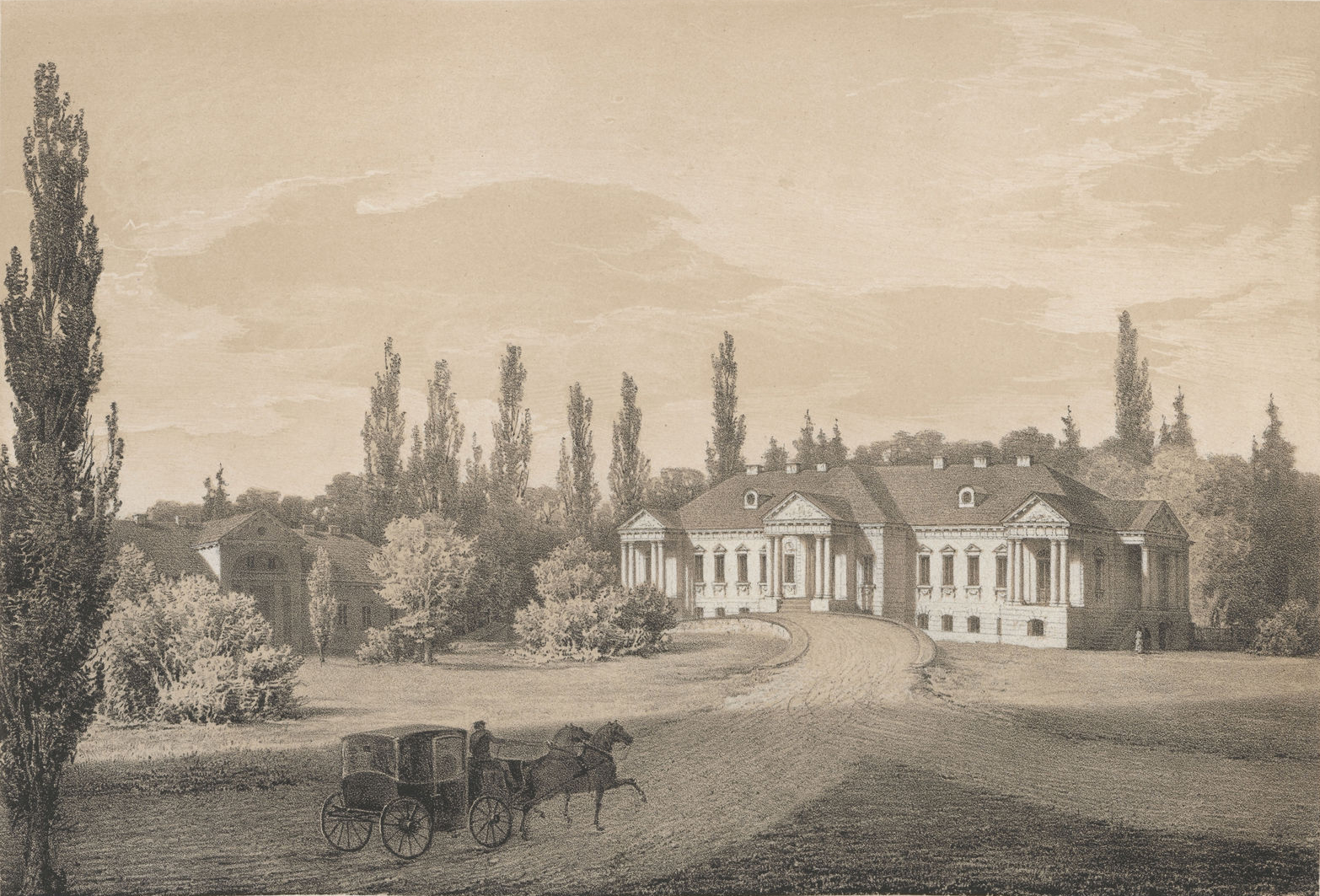
- Skirmunt Estate in Moladaw, N. Orda

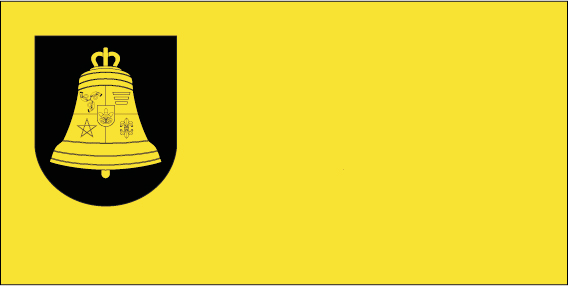
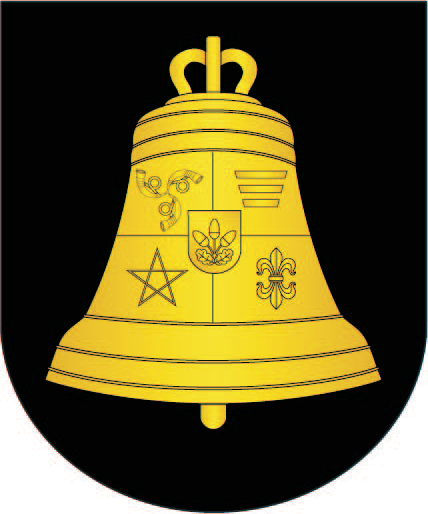
- Flag Coat of arms

- Location in Belarus
- Coordinates: 52°16′N 25°41′E
- Country: Belarus
- Region: Brest Region
- District: Ivanava District
- Time zone: UTC+3 (MSK)
- Area code: +375 1652

Moladava (Belarusian: Моладава; Russian: Молодово, romanized: Molodovo; Polish: Mołodów) is an agrotown in Ivanava District, Brest Region, Belarus.

== History ==
On March 11, 2011, presidential decree "On the establishment of official heraldic symbols of administrative-territorial and territorial units of the Brest region" adopted emblem and flag of the village.
